= Mark X =

Mark X or Mark 10 often refers to the tenth version of a product, frequently military hardware. "Mark", meaning "model" or "variant", can be abbreviated "Mk."

Mark X or Mark 10 may refer to:

== Military and weaponry ==
- 21-inch Mark 10 torpedo (1915), an American torpedo
- 21-inch Mark X torpedo (1939), a British wet heater torpedo
- Spitfire Mk X, a Supermarine Spitfire reconnaissance variant with pressurised cockpit
- Bristol Beaufighter TF Mk X, a major torpedo and strike aircraft of its day
- Limbo (weapon) or Anti Submarine Mortar Mark 10 (1955), common British three-barreled mortar fitted to Royal Navy escort ships
- Mark 10 nuclear bomb, a proposed weapon design that did not go into production
- Mk 10 missile launcher, used to launch the Convair RIM-2 Terrier two-stage medium-range naval surface-to-air missile (SAM)
- Martin-Baker Mk.10, an ejection seat

== Vehicles ==
- Jaguar Mark X, a large British automobile
- Toyota Mark X, a Japanese automobile
- Lincoln Mark X, an American concept car
- Lincoln MKX, an American car referred to at its inception as the "Mark-Ex"
- Cooper Mark X, a Formula Three racing car

== Other uses ==
- Mark 10 or Mark X, the tenth chapter of the Gospel of Mark in the New Testament of the Christian Bible

== See also ==
- X mark
- MKX (disambiguation)
- mk10 (disambiguation)
