= Jaguar XK engine =

Jaguar XK
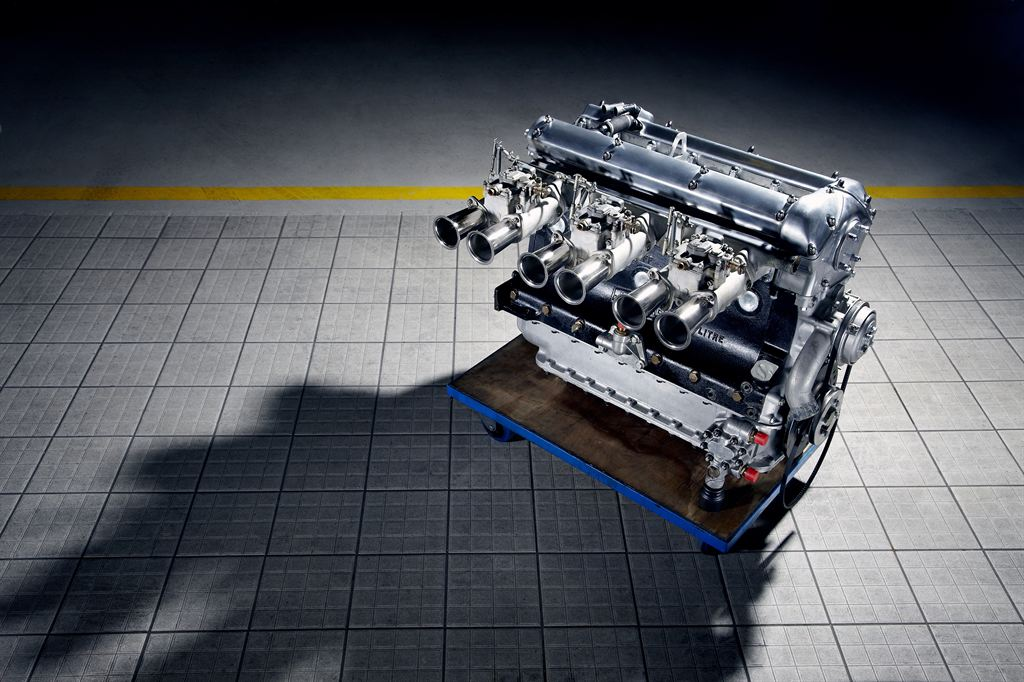

Overview
- Manufacturer: Jaguar Cars
- Production: 1949–1992

Chronology
- Successor: Jaguar AJ6

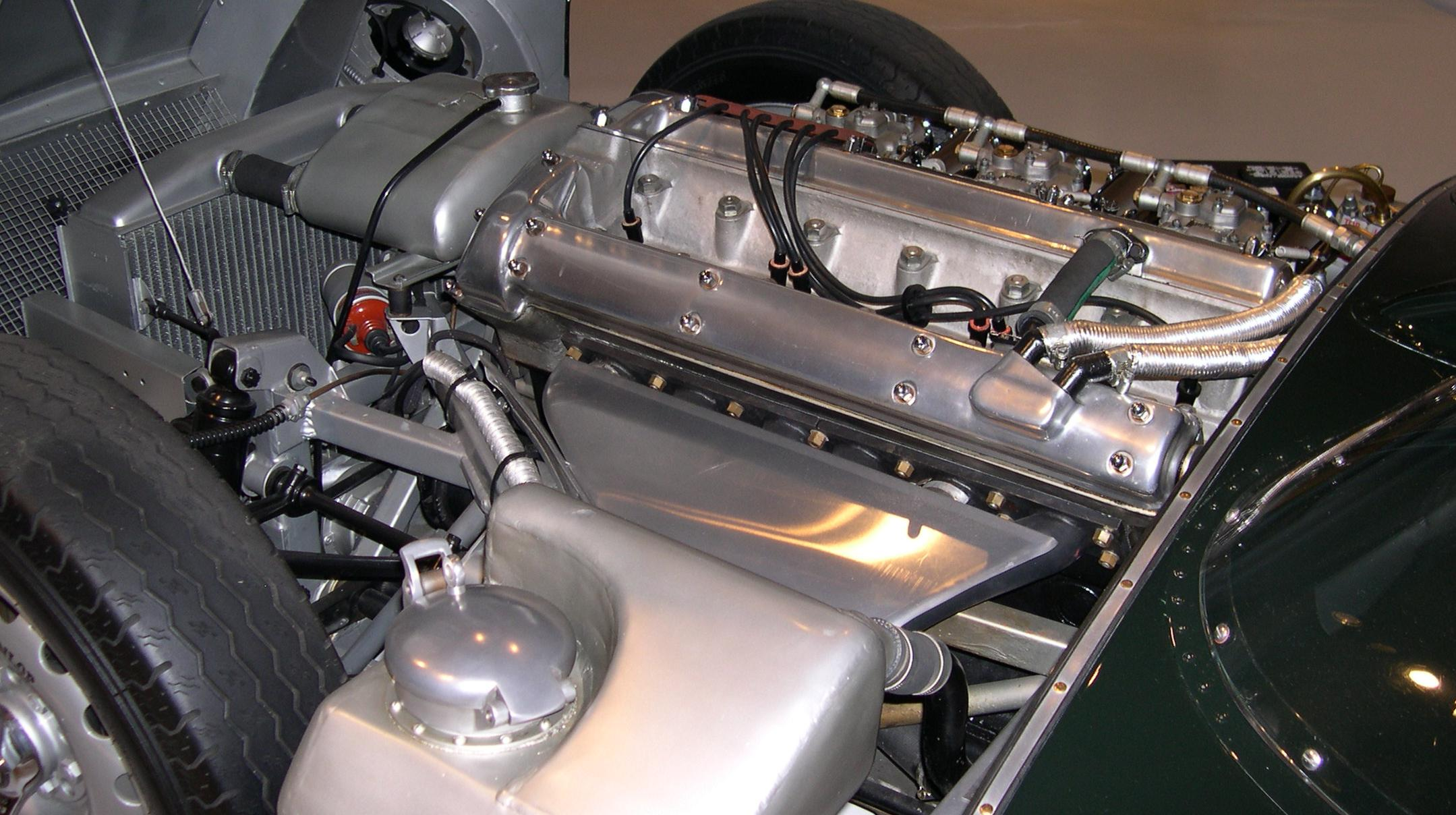
Jaguar XK engine in a 1955 Jaguar D-Type

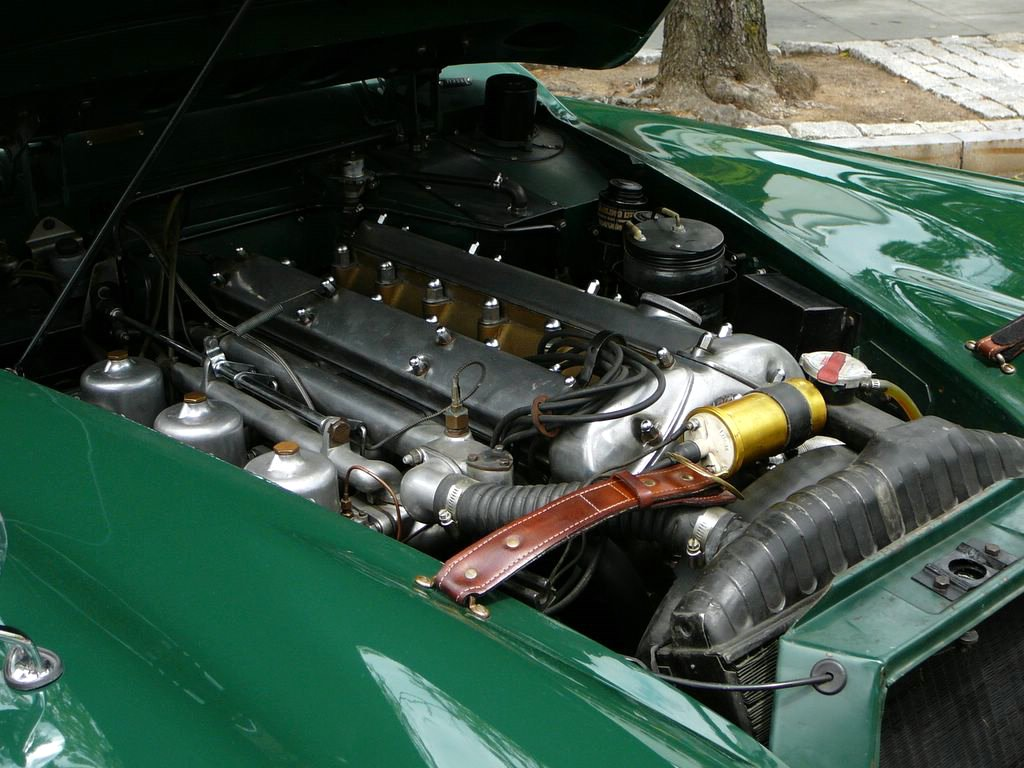
XK engine in an XK150

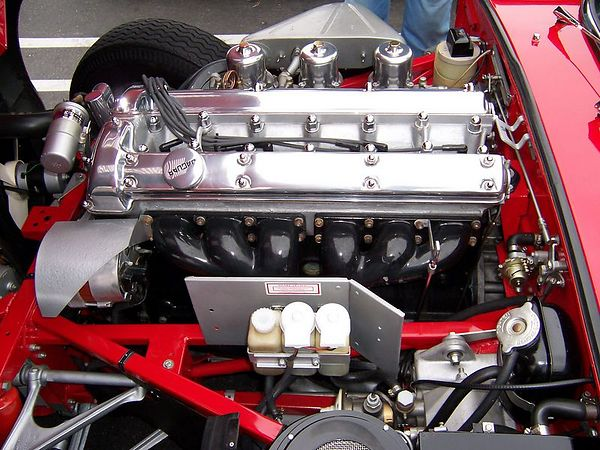
Jaguar XK engine in a Jaguar E-Type

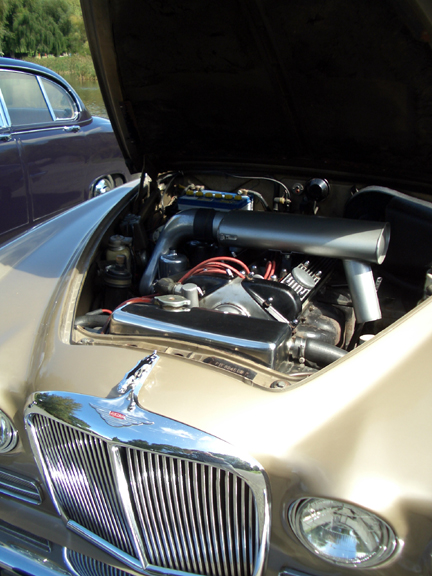
4.2-litre XK in a Jaguar 420

The Jaguar XK is an inline 6-cylinder dual overhead camshaft (DOHC) engine produced by Jaguar Cars between 1949 and 1992. Introduced as a 3.4-litre, it earned fame on both the road and track, being produced in five hemispherical head displacements between 2.4 and 4.2-litres for Jaguar passenger cars, with other sizes being made by Jaguar and privateers for racing. A de-rated version was also used in certain military vehicles built by Alvis and Daimler.

== Early development ==
Prior to World War II, SS Cars (which changed its name to Jaguar in 1945) used three engines produced by the Standard Motor Company: a 1.5-litre 4-cylinder and 6-cylinder engines of 2.5- and 3.5-litres. Sir William Lyons and his engine designers; William Heynes (Chief Engineer), Walter Hassan, Claude Baily, and Harry Weslake are widely reported to have discussed a new range of replacements whilst fire-watching on the roof of the SS factory in Swallow Road, Coventry, during German World War II bombing raids. Rather than developing prototype engines immediately after the war, it is claimed that Jaguar's wartime engine developments went far beyond mere discussion and design, extending to the construction and testing of several prototype engines as early as 1943.

The initial aim was to produce a series of engines of higher than normal output that would be able to stay ahead of the competition without revision for many years and which Sir William insisted also had to "look good". In 1942–43, a range of configurations was considered and it was concluded that, for good breathing and high brake mean effective pressure (BMEP), the new engines would need vee-opposed valves operating in hemispherical combustion chambers. Two configurations of this type were selected for comparison in 1943 and the prototypes named "XG" and "XF". The XG 4-cylinder of 1,776 cc, first tested in October 1943, was based on the 1.5-litre Standard block and used its single cam-in-block to operate the opposed valves via a complicated crossover pushrod arrangement, similar to that of the pre-war BMW 328. The XF 4-cylinder of 1,732 cc used the now familiar dual overhead cam (DOHC) configuration and was first tested in November 1944. The XG was found to suffer from excessive pushrod and rocker noise and gas flow figures through its vertical valve ports did not equal those of the horizontal ports on the XF. Therefore, from these two options, the DOHC XF layout was selected.

4-cylinder engine development progressed as follows:

- XG Pushrod engine 73 x 106 x 4 1776 cc May to Nov 1944
- XF 75 x 98 x 4 1732 cc Nov 1944 to Jun 1945
- XK1 (first of Heynes’ 4 x XJs) 76.25 x 98 x 4 1790 cc Oct 1945 to Nov 1946
- XK2 76.25 x 98 x 4 1790 cc Feb to Sep 1946
- XK3 76.25 x 98 x 4 1790 cc Dec 1946 to Feb 1947
- XK4 76.25 x 98 x 4 1790 cc Nov 1946 to Dec 1947
- Gardner Engine (used in record-breaking MG car) 1970 cc 1948
- XK Number 1 3-bearing crank 1970 cc 1949–1952
- XK Number 2 3-bearing crank 1970 cc 1950–1952
- XK 5-bearing crank 1970 cc 1953

By September 1947 a 3.2-litre 6-cylinder version had been produced, called the "XJ 6-cylinder", which was intended to replace both Standard-based 6-cylinder units. Testing showed the need for higher torque at low speeds than this engine could produce and hence it was 'stroked' to 3,442 cc to form the "XK 6-cylinder", which saw its debut in an open two-seat XK120 sports car at the 1948 London Motor Show. Following this the XK powered the Jaguar Mark VII and a number of other models in subsequent years.

The XG prototype soldiered on as a component testbed until 1948. There also existed an "XK 4-cylinder" of 1,790 cc, also first tested in October 1945 and remaining under development alongside the XK 6-cylinder units. At the time of William Heynes' paper presented to the IMechE in February 1953, the XK 4-cylinder was still referred to as being under development. It was only finally dropped as a possible production engine later in 1953, by which time it had been realised that Jaguar's image in the market had moved beyond the need for a replacement for the old 1.5-litre Standard 4-cylinder unit.

Because the 6-cylinder XK prototypes were found to be so much more refined than the 4-cylinder versions, in 1951 a 1,986 cc 6-cylinder version of the XK 6-cylinder was built to see if it would suffice as a smaller scale engine. By 1954 this had grown to 2,483 cc and it was this short-block version of the XK 6-cylinder that was fitted to the new compact Jaguar 2.4-litre (retrospectively known as the Mark 1) released in that year. None of the 4-cylinder prototypes ever advanced to production but Lt. Col. Goldie Gardner's speed record team did fit a 1970 cc version to the MG streamliner EX-135 in 1948 to take the 2,000 cc class record at 177 mph (285 km/h), on the Jabbeke motorway in Belgium.

There are some misleading claims of an intervening "XJ" 4-cylinder prototype but it seems the only person who referred to them as such was William Heynes in a paper presented to the IMechE in 1953. Heynes stated there were many 4-cylinder variants following the XF but it was he alone who loosely grouped them as XJ. The last mention of XF was in July 1945 and the first mention of XK (XK1) was in October of the same year. This doesn't give much room for a series of XJ engines.There are no mentions of XJ in the archive (other than in Heynes’ paper). If there is a XJ, the first one is likely to have been referred to as XK1 internally. There were three others of nominally 1790 cc capacity called XK2, XK3 & XK4. It is likely these are what Heynes referred to as "XJ". The first "true" XK was called "XK Number 1" (distinct from "XK1") and was of 1970 cc nominal capacity with an 83mm/91mm bore/stroke.

Thus were developed the two block sizes that formed the basis of all subsequent XK 6-cylinder engines; the shorter block being used for the 2.4 and 2.8-litre engines and the full sized block for both versions of the 3.4, the 3.8 and the 4.2-litre engines.

== Production ==
The castings for the XK block were manufactured for Jaguar by Leyland Motors. In 1968, Jaguar laid off 2,500 workers at both Radford and Brown Lane due to strike by Leyland workers over pay parity after the merger of Leyland with British Motor Holdings, which Jaguar estimated had cost them a loss of 160 cars a day at a cost of £320,000.

== Description ==
=== Valve train ===
The most recognisable feature of the XK engine is the dual cam covers atop the engine, which were a polished alloy until a change to ribbed black and alloy finish in early 1968, four years or so after the introduction of the 4.2-litre versions in 1964. The unusual depth of the engine's cylinder head was dictated by the desire to make room for two generously sized valves, whilst not excessively restricting the flow of gases into and out of the hemispherical combustion chambers. To satisfy these two conditions, a relatively wide angle between the valves was initially chosen, with quite long valve stems. To efficiently operate valves whose tops were such a long way apart, the dual overhead cam arrangement was found to be the most effective.

The cam lobes act directly on bucket type tappets, which are adjusted by means of shims between the underside of the bucket and the top of the valves. Two duplex chains drive the camshafts, one from the crankshaft to a sprocket at the level of the combustion chambers, and one from the sprocket to each camshaft. The original sprung slipper design of the lower cam chain tensioner proved to be too weak and after a couple of years was changed to an improved hydraulic design, using engine oil pressure.

=== Cylinder head ===
The cylinder heads were made of RR50 aluminium alloy due to that material's high rate of heat conduction and light weight, the latter estimated by William Heynes to give a weight saving of some 70 lb (32 kg) compared with a similar head made of cast iron. Special attention was paid to the gas flow, with Harry Weslake and Heynes designing a curved inlet port to impart swirl to the air/fuel mixture for improved combustion. The same basic cylinder head layout was preserved throughout the production life of the engine but with many detail changes. Valve and port sizes and angles, camshaft lift, compression ratio and carburetion were frequently amended from model to model, depending upon whether power or torque was being emphasised. Very early XK engines fitted to the XK 120 sports car and Mark VII saloon lacked fixing studs at the front part of the cam covers, where they covered the timing chains, which leaked oil as a result. From 1951 onwards, all XK engines had studs around the full perimeter of the cam covers.

The earliest cylinder heads are known as "Standard" or "A type" heads and are identifiable by their differing valve angles of 30 degrees inlet and 45 degrees exhaust, as well as by their unpainted aluminium finish. Around 1954, the "B type" head appeared, with equal valve angles of 35 degrees on inlet and exhaust. The "B type" heads are painted light "duck egg" blue (early cars) to light green (later cars) in the 2.4 and 3.4-litre models and metallic dark blue in 3.8-litre models. A very few XK 120s and XK 140s were supplied to customers with the "C type" cylinder head, which was painted red and carried a plaque on each cam cover stating "Jaguar Type C".

A supposedly more efficient "straight port" cylinder head, again with equal 35 degree angles on the inlet and exhaust was introduced later in the 1950s and this was painted pumpkin orange on the XK-150S. The cylinder heads in the Series 1 E-type and Mark X were painted gold whether the engine was a 3.8-litre or 4.2-litre. Around the time of the later series 1 E-Types and 420G in 1968, about the same time as the arrival of the ribbed cam covers, the practice of painting the cylinder heads ceased. Many sources still describe the subsequent unpainted aluminium finish as "silver".

Jaguar's colour-coding of its cylinder heads of the late 1950s and early 1960s can be determined from Heiner Stertkamp's list below. The only real anomaly is that the earliest 3.8-litre E-Types had an orange painted head (because they had 3 carburettors) but later changed to gold (because they had straight-port heads). Gold paint signified a straight port triple-carburettor setup from then until the demise of the Mark X.

- Silver/bare aluminium => 3.4 A-type head (Standard XK120, XK140 and MkVII with two H6 carburettors)
- Red => 3.4-litre with C-type head and 2 carburettors (XK 120 C and XK 140SE/M only)
- Light duck egg blue and later light green => 3.4-litre with B-type head and 2 carburettors (may appear as light blue, light green or light blue-green)
- Dark blue metallic => 3.8-litre with B-type head and 2 carburettors
- Orange => 3.4 and 3.8-litre with straight-port head and 3 carburettors
- Gold => later 3.8-litre and all 4.2-litre (until 420G and Series 2 E-Type) with straight-port head and 3 carburettors

Cars with the straight-port head and only two carburettors did not have painted heads. See the complete table of XK cylinder head types as they relate to Jaguar and Daimler models at the end of this article.

=== Engine block ===
The block was made of cast iron (with the exception of some made of aluminium alloy for racing engines), with the crankcase split on the centreline of the seven-bearing crankshaft. The crankshaft was made of EN16 steel, heat treated prior to machining. An innovation was the fitting of a proprietary Metalastik vibration damper on the nose of the crankshaft to eliminate damaging crankshaft resonances. The design and materials of the bottom end of the engine hardly changed throughout its life, apart from the changes dictated by the respaced cylinders of the 4.2-litre version (also used by the 'new 3.4' litre version). The oil pump was changed after a couple of years from a relatively inefficient gear-type pump to a Hobourn-Eaton eccentric-lobe unit.

=== Fuel system ===
The pre-injection cars had either two or three SU, Weber, Zenith or Zenith-Stromberg carburettors of various sizes depending upon the model and market, although Weber carburettors were only available from the dealer or on the aftermarket, and not supplied by the factory. The exception to this was 2.4-litre cars up to the introduction of the 240, these earlier cars having twin Solex downdraught carburettors. Some D-Type sports racing cars received fuel injection, but it did not become available on the road cars until 1978, beginning on certain US market models in order to comply with government fuel-efficiency standards. It was eventually extended across the range and to all markets.

=== Power rating ===
During the 1950s and 1960s Jaguar released SAE gross horsepower figures, using the measurement system preferred by US manufacturers, as otherwise its cars would have appeared under-powered in comparison with US cars. This practice was superseded by reliance on the more realistic SAE net horsepower system around 1972, although Jaguar power ratings of that era may also be expressed using the very similar DIN net rating system. Since the conditions upon which the SAE gross figures were determined were not recorded, an objective comparison of the power outputs of the various models of XK powered Jaguar over time is impossible.

The 1965 4.2 XK fitted to the carburetted E-Type had a listed output of 265 hp (198 kW) SAE gross; the 1986 fuel injected 4.2 XK fitted to the series 3 XJ6 was listed at 202 hp (151 kW) DIN net. Variables such as compression ratio, cam lifts and durations, and fuel consumption rate for each engine during testing would, at a minimum, be additionally required to develop any estimated comparisons.

== Individual displacements ==
=== 3.4-litre ===
The first production use of the XK straight-6 was in the 1948 Jaguar XK120, which used the 3.4 L (3,441 cc; 210.0 cu in) version with a bore x stroke of 83 mm × 106 mm (3.27 in × 4.17 in). It had an iron block without cylinder liners and aluminium cylinder head. It had a wider gap between cylinders 3 and 4 than between the other cylinders. The 3.4 was first rated at 160 bhp (162 PS; 119 kW) SAE gross at a compression ratio of 8:1, rising to 210 bhp (213 PS; 157 kW) SAE gross with the C-type cylinder head (confusingly not the head from the C-Type as raced at Le Mans) all the way to 250 bhp (253 PS; 186 kW) SAE gross with the "straight port" head at a compression ratio of 9:1 as fitted to the XK150SE.

Almost as soon as the new compact Jaguar 2.4-litre was released, there was pressure on Jaguar to fit the 3.4-litre engine to it. This was duly done in February 1957, the car being known as the Jaguar 3.4-litre. The designation "Mark 1" for these cars was applied retrospectively, after the release of the Mark 2 in 1959.

The original 3.4-litre XK was used in the following road cars:

- Jaguar XK120 - 1948–53, "Standard (or "A type")" cylinder head, bare aluminium finish, 2 × SU H6 carburettors. The XK 120 C came with the C-type head (red) as an option from 1951 to 1952 with 2 × SU H8 carburettors. In 1953, the XK 120 C switched to a triple 40 DCOE Weber carburetor setup. The XK 120 SE and M came with the C-type head as an option with 2 × SU H6 carburettors (occasionally SU H8)
- Jaguar XK140 - 1954–57, "Standard (or "A type")" cylinder head, 2 × SU H6 carburettors. The XK 140 SE or M came with the C-type head as an option, painted red with 2 × SU H6 or H8 carburettors
- Jaguar XK 150 3.4 - 1957–61, "B type" cylinder head, painted light blue-green, 2 × SU HD6 carburettors
- Jaguar XK 150 3.4S - 1957–61, "Straight port" cylinder head, painted orange, 3 × SU HD8 carburettors
- Jaguar Mark VII - 1950–54, "A type" then "C type" (as option from April 1953) cylinder head, unpainted aluminium, 2 × SU H6 carburettors
- Jaguar MkVIIM - 1954–57, "C type" cylinder head, 2 × SU H6 carburettors, some had high-lift cams
- Jaguar Mark VIII - 1956–1958, "B type" cylinder head, painted light blue-green, 2 × SU HD6 carburettors
- Jaguar 3.4-litre 'Mark 1' - 1957–59, "B type" cylinder head, painted light blue-green, 2 × SU HD6 carburettors
- Jaguar 3.4-litre Mark 2 - 1959–67, "B type" cylinder head, painted light blue-green, 2 × SU HD6 carburettors
- Jaguar 340 Mark 2 - 1967–68, "B type" cylinder head, ribbed cam covers, 2 × SU HD6 carburettors
- Jaguar S-Type 3.4 - 1963–68, "B type" cylinder head painted light blue-green, smooth cam covers, 2 × SU HD6 carburettors

=== 2.4-litre ===
In the mid-1950s, Jaguar lacked a compact saloon of the type represented until 1949 by the Standard-engined 1½-litre. In choosing a power unit for its all new compact saloon, Jaguar could choose between the 1,995 cc four-cylinder XK prototype and a downsized version of the 3.4-litre six-cylinder XK. The 4-cylinder was considered too low powered and unrefined. The 3.4 was already well "undersquare", which means that its bore was much less than its stroke, so a smaller bore version of the 3.4 was not seen as a realistic proposition. Jaguar was therefore obliged to create a short-stroke version of the 6-cylinder XK with a shorter cylinder block, reducing it in height from 11.5 in (292 mm) to 8.85 in (225 mm).

Introduced in the Jaguar 2.4-litre in 1955, the engine had a stroke of 76.5 mm (3.0 in) while retaining the bore of 83 mm (3.3 in) to give a capacity of 2,483 cc (151.5 cu in). Despite having a displacement of almost 2.5-litres, the new car was called the "Jaguar 2.4" to create an obvious separation from the old Standard 2½-litre and link it to the now familiar 3.4-litre XK engine. The 2.4s produced were rated at 112 bhp (nett) by the factory, using twin Solex downdraft carburettors.

In 1959 the engine was carried over into the new Mark 2, in which it produced 120 hp (89 kW) SAE gross, still with Solex carburettors. The Jaguar 240 was fitted with an uprated version of the engine, incorporating the straight-port cylinder head and twin SU carburettors delivering 133 bhp SAE gross.

The 2.4-litre XK was used in the following cars:

- Jaguar 2.4-litre 'Mark 1' - 1955–59, "B type" cylinder head, unpainted, 2 × Solex B32PB15S carburettors, valve angles 30 degrees inlet, 45 degrees exhaust
- Jaguar 2.4-litre Mark 2 - 1959–67, "B type" cylinder head, unpainted, 2 × Solex B32PB15S carburettors, valve angles 45 degrees inlet and exhaust
- Jaguar 240 Mark 2 - 1967–69, "Straight port" cylinder head, unpainted, 2 × SU HD6 carburettors, valve angles 45 degrees inlet and exhaust

=== 3.8-litre ===
The 3.8-litre version was released in 1958, initially for the last of the XK150s and the Mark IX saloon. It retained the 3.4's bore centres and 106 mm (4.2 in) stroke but was bored out to 87 mm (3.4 in) for a total displacement of 3.8 L (3,781 cc; 230.7 cu in). The distance between the cylinder bores was sufficiently small that it was decided to fit dry liners to the bores. The 3.8 had a number of detail differences from the 3.4, particularly in its valve gear and carburetion. The standard 3.8 produced 220 hp (164 kW) SAE gross and up to 265 hp (198 kW) SAE gross in the XK150SE with the straight port head. A 4-valve per cylinder version was prototyped in the 1970's for the upcoming XJ40 saloon car, however although the "24-valve alloy-blocked 3.8 litre XK unit showed good results, its ancient tooling and age retained too many baked-in legacy issues" and was not proceeded with, instead the AJ6 engine was developed instead.

The 3.8-litre XK was used in the following road cars:

- Jaguar XK 150 3.8 - 1958–61, "B type" cylinder head, painted dark blue metallic, 2 × SU HD6 carburettors
- Jaguar XK150 3.8S - 1958–61, "Straight port" cylinder head, painted pumpkin orange, 3 × SU HD8 carburettors
- Jaguar Mark IX - 1958–61, "B type" cylinder head, painted dark blue metallic, 2 × SU HD6 carburettors
- Jaguar Mark X 3.8 - 1961–64, "Straight port" cylinder head, painted gold, 3 × SU HD8 carburettors
- Jaguar Mark 2 - 1959–67, "B type" cylinder head, painted dark blue metallic, 2 × SU HD6 carburettors
- Jaguar E-Type Series 1 3.8 - 1961–64, "Straight port" cylinder head, painted orange then gold, 3 × SU HD8 carburettors
- Jaguar S-Type 3.8 - 1963–68, "B type" cylinder head, dark blue metallic or later with smooth cam covers and unpainted, 2 × SU HD6 carburettors
- Panther J.72

=== 3.0-litre ===
3-litre versions of the XK engine were built from 1959 onwards for FIA sports car racing with a 85 mm (3.35 in) bore and 88 mm (3.46 in) stroke. It was also popular with small race car manufacturers such as Lister Cars who could not afford to produce their own engines. As well as endurance racing, the engine was also used in Formula Libre racing.

A 3.0-litre XK was used in the following road cars:

- Jaguar E2A prototype sports racer (1960)
- Jaguar E-type lightweight sports racer (1961)
- Jaguar D-type (non-works) sports racer (1959)
- Lister Cars endurance and formula racers
- Hersham and Walton Motors (HWM) endurance and formula racers
- Cooper Car Company endurance and formula racers
- John Tojeiro endurance and formula racers

=== 4.2-litre ===
A bored-out 4.2-litre version of the XK was officially released in 1964, although racers had been boring the 3.8 out to 4.2-litres for years. The factory 4.2-litre block was a new siamesed sleeve design which used respaced cylinders set evenly along the length of the block with new main bearing spacings and a new crankshaft. The middle two cylinders were moved closer together and the outer two moved further apart but the overall length of the block remained unchanged. This enabled the cylinder bores to be taken out to 92.08 mm (3.63 in) whilst retaining the familiar long stroke of 106 mm (4.17 in) for a total displacement of 4.2 L (4,235 cc; 258.4 cu in).

Despite the re-spacing of the cylinder bores, the cylinder head castings remained unchanged. As a result, the centrelines of the combustion chambers in the head no longer aligned precisely with the centrelines of the cylinders but this did not matter greatly as the combustion chamber diameters in the head were smaller than the cylinder diameters. The 3.8 and 4.2-litre cylinder heads and cams are therefore interchangeable. The 4.2-litre engine from the factory had unsmoothed steps between the inlet manifold and head, and the manifold gaskets were not a good match for the inlet ports. These engines therefore make excellent bases for some modification, achieving approx. 220 bhp (164 kW; 223 PS) SAE net and increased torque merely by "flowing" the head.

Published horsepower ratings of the various versions of the 4.2-litre are complicated by the switch from gross to net horsepower systems during its lifetime. For example, in 1965 the 4.2-litre with triple SU HD8 carburetors fitted to the US-specification E-Type was rated at 265 hp (269 PS; 198 kW) at 5400 rpm SAE gross and a maximum torque of 384 N⋅m (283 lb⋅ft) at 4000 rpm whereas by 1969, now with twin Zenith-Stromberg carburetors, this had fallen to 246 hp (183 kW) SAE gross. The difference indicates the effect of the revised carburetion and other changes made to reduce exhaust emissions from US specification engines. Jeff Daniels' reference states that the similar twin Zenith-Stromberg version fitted to a US specification XJ6 was rated by Jaguar at 170 PS (125 kW; 168 hp) using the DIN net horsepower system, the difference being largely due to the effect of the gross versus net horsepower rating systems.

The 1987 Jaguar XJ6 was the last Jaguar car fitted with the XK engine. In 1992 the last Daimler DS420 Limousine was produced. Like all other DS420 limousines, it was equipped with a 4.2-litre XK engine. The 4.2 variant was also used in some military vehicles with relatively few modifications. The XK engine has the rare accolade of having been in production and service in cars spanning six consecutive decades.

All of the 4.2-litre XK engines used the straight port head. After the arrival of the ribbed cam covers in 1967 the heads normally remained unpainted, which some sources describe as "silver".

The 4.2-litre XK was used in the following cars:

- Jaguar Mark X 4.2 - 1964–66, "straight port" cylinder head, painted gold, 3 × SU HD8 carburettors
- Jaguar 420 - 1966–68, 2 × SU HD8 carburettors
- Daimler Sovereign - 1966–69, 2 × SU HD8 carburettors
- Jaguar 420G - 1966–70, painted gold, 3 × SU HD8 carburettors
- Jaguar E-Type Series 1 4.2 - 1964–68, painted gold, 3 × SU HD8 carburettors (from 1967 US specification E-Types used 2 × Zenith-Stromberg 175 CDSE carburettors for reduced emissions)
- Jaguar E-Type Series 2 - 1968–70, 3 × SU HD8 carburettors (US specification E-Types used 2 × Zenith-Stromberg 175 CDSE carburettors for reduced emissions)
- Jaguar XJ6 4.2 Series 1 - 1968–73, 2 × SU HD8 carburettors (North American specification XJ6 used 2 × Zenith-Stromberg 175 CDSE carburettors for reduced emissions)
- Daimler Sovereign 4.2 'XJ6' Series 1 - 1969–73, 2 × SU HD8 carburettors
- Jaguar XJ6 4.2 Series 2 - 1973–74, 2 × SU HS8 carburettors (North American specification XJ6 used 2 × Zenith-Stromberg 175 CDSE carburettors for reduced emissions)
- Daimler Sovereign 4.2 'XJ6' Series 2 - 1973–74, 2 × SU HS8 carburettors
- Jaguar XJ6 L 4.2 Series 2 - 1973–79, 2 × SU HS8 carburettors. From 1977, 2 × SU HIF7 carburettors, US market from May 1978 Bosch-Lucas L-Jetronic electronic injection
- Daimler Sovereign LWB 4.2 'XJ6' Series 2 - 1973–79 (and Daimler Vanden Plas 1975–79), 2 × SU HS8 carburettors. From 1977, 2 × SU HIF7 carburettors, US market (VDP only) from May 1978 Bosch-Lucas L-Jetronic
- Jaguar XJ6 4.2 Series 3 - 1979–87, 2 × SU carburettors or Bosch-Lucas L-Jetronic electronic injection
- Daimler 4.2 'XJ6' Series 3 - 1979–86, 2 × SU carburettors or Bosch-Lucas L-Jetronic electronic injection
- Daimler DS420 Limousine - 1968–92, 2 × SU HD8 carburettors. From 1985 Bosch-Lucas L-Jetronic electronic injection
- Panther J.72
- Panther De Ville

It was also used in the Combat Vehicle Reconnaissance (Tracked) - CVR(T) - family of military vehicles: e.g.,

- FV101 Scorpion, a light tank
- FV107 Scimitar, an armoured reconnaissance vehicle

and the corresponding Combat Vehicle Reconnaissance (Wheeled) - CVR(W) - family: e.g., Fox armoured reconnaissance vehicle plus the Dennis D600 fire engine.

=== 2.8-litre ===
A 2.8-litre version of the XK was introduced for the entry-level XJ6 models in 1968. It had a similar short block to the old the 2.4 with addition of the later two rear water cooling holes for the straight port cylinder head, retaining the bore of 83 mm (3.3 in) but lengthening the stroke by 9.5 mm (0.4 in) to 86 mm (3.4 in) to give a displacement of 2.8 L (2,792 cc; 170.4 cu in). The power output of the 2.8 was listed as 142 PS (104 kW; 140 hp) DIN net, which cannot be directly compared with the 133 bhp SAE gross of the last of the 2.4s in the 240 Mark 2.

The 2.8 gained a bad reputation early in its career due to a tendency for excessive carbon deposits to accumulate on the piston crowns during low-speed running, which would burn through the crowns when run at higher revs. This was later cured by a switch to stronger pistons but the engine was also a mediocre performer offering no real economy benefit and it was dropped in 1973, to be replaced by the ‘new’ 3.4.

All of the 2.8-litre XK engines used the straight port head unpainted, which some sources may describe as "silver", and had ribbed cam covers.

The 2.8-litre XK was used in the following cars:

- XJ6 2.8 Series 1 - 1968–73, 2 × SU HD8 carburettors
- Daimler Sovereign 2.8 'XJ6' Series 1 – 1969–72, 2 × SU HD8 carburettors
- XJ6 2.8 Series 2 - 1973–74, 2 × SU HS8 carburettors

=== "New" 3.4-litre ===
Introduced in 1975 to replace the 2.8 in the entry level XJ6, the new 3.4 was not a simple revival of the original XK. Whilst it shared the old 3.4’s bore and stroke of 83 mm (3.3 in) and 106 mm (4.2 in) respectively, it carried over some features of the newer 4.2-litre engine - the main bearing spacings and bearing sizes, and stiffer bottom end but dispensing with the cylinder liners used by the 3.8 and 4.2. However the cylinder spacing remained as the original 1948 design. With an 83mm bore, the cylinders needed to line up with the combustion chambers in the cylinder head (whose centres remained as the original 1948 design right up to the end of XK-engine production. It used a straight port head and delivered 161 PS (118 kW; 159 hp) DIN net and far superior torque to the 2.8.

The "new 3.4" used the straight port head, had ribbed cam covers and the heads were unpainted.

The "New 3.4" litre XK was used in the following cars:

- XJ6 3.4 Series 2 - 1975–79, ribbed cam covers, 2 × SU HS8 carburettors. From 1977, 2 × SU HIIF7 carburettors
- Daimler Sovereign 'XJ6' 3.4 Series 2 – 1975–79, ribbed cam covers, 2 × SU HS8 carburettors. From 1977, 2 × SU HIIF7 carburettors
- XJ6 Series 3 - 1979–86, ribbed cam covers, 2 × SU carburettors

== Cylinder head types ==
The following table relates XK cylinder head type to Jaguar/Daimler model and includes the paint colours applied to certain versions of the cylinder head in the 1950s and 60s. Unpainted heads are sometimes referred to as "silver" but this is merely the natural colour of the aluminium alloy.

"A" head	Mark VII 3.4; Mark VII M 3.4; XK 120 3.4; XK 120 SE 3.4; XK 120 M 3.4; XK 140 3.4; XK 140 SE 3.4; XK 140 M 3.4; 2.4-litre 'Mark 1'
"B" head	Mark VIII 3.4 (painted light blue-green); Mark IX 3.8 (painted dark blue metallic); XK 150 3.4 (painted light blue-green); XK 150 3.4 S (painted orange); XK 150 3.8 (painted dark blue metallic); Prototype E1A 2.4; 3.4-litre 'Mark 1' (painted light blue-green); 2.4-litre 'Mark 2'; 3.4-litre 'Mark 2' (painted light blue-green); 3.8-litre 'Mark 2' (painted dark blue metallic); 340 'Mark 2'; S-Type 3.4 (painted light blue-green); S-Type 3.8 (painted dark blue metallic)
"Wide Angle" head	D-Type 3.4 (from 1955); XK-SS 3.4; Prototype E2A 3.0
“C” head	Mark VII 3.4 (as option from April 1953); Mark VII M 3.4 (as option); XK 120 C 3.4; XK 120 SE 3.4 (as option from April 1954); XK 120 M 3.4 (as option from April 1954); XK 140 SE 3.4 (as option) (painted red); XK 140 M 3.4 (as option) (painted red)
“Straight port” head	XK 150 3.8 S (painted orange); 240 Mark 2; 420; Daimler Sovereign (420); E-Type 'Series 1' 3.8 (painted orange then later gold); E-Type Lightweight 3.0; E-Type 4.2 (painted gold); E-Type Series 2 4.2; Mark X 3.8 and 4.2 (painted gold); 420G (unpainted); Daimler DS 420; XJ6 2.8 and 4.2 Series 1 Daimler Sovereign 2.8 and 4.2 (Series 1); XJ6 2.8 and 4.2 Series 2 Daimler Sovereign 4.2 (Series 2); XJ6 Coupe 4.2; Daimler Sovereign Two-Door; XJ 3.4 Series 2 Daimler Sovereign 3.4 (Series 2); XJ6 L 4.2 Series 2 Daimler VDP 4.2 Series 2 XJ6 Series 3 3.4 and 4.2; Daimler Sovereign and VDP Series 3

== See also ==
- Jaguar AJ-V6 engine
- Jaguar V12 engine
