= MKX (disambiguation) =

MKX is a protein.

MKX may also refer to:

- Lincoln MKX, an automobile
- Jaguar Mark X, an automobile
- Mortal Kombat X, a video game
- National Weather Service Milwaukee/Sullivan, Wisconsin, (WFO ID MKX), a National Weather Service forecast office based out of Milwaukee Mitchell International Airport

== See also ==
- Mark X (disambiguation) also covering Mark 10 (Mk10)
- mk10 (disambiguation)
