= T42 =

T42 may refer to:

== Vehicles ==
- Beechcraft T-42 Cochise, an American trainer aircraft
- T42 medium tank, a 1950s American tank design
- T-42 super-heavy tank, a Soviet tank project from the inter-war period
- SJ T42, a Swedish diesel-electric locomotive
- Slingsby T.42 Eagle, a British glider
- Cooper T42, a British Formula Three racing car: see Cooper Mark X
- Mecklenburg T 42, a former class name for a Class 99 steam locomotive

== Other uses ==
- T42 (classification), a disability sport classification for above knee amputees
- IBM ThinkPad T42, a laptop model
- Ruth Airport, in Trinity County, California, United States
