= Jaguar Mark IX =

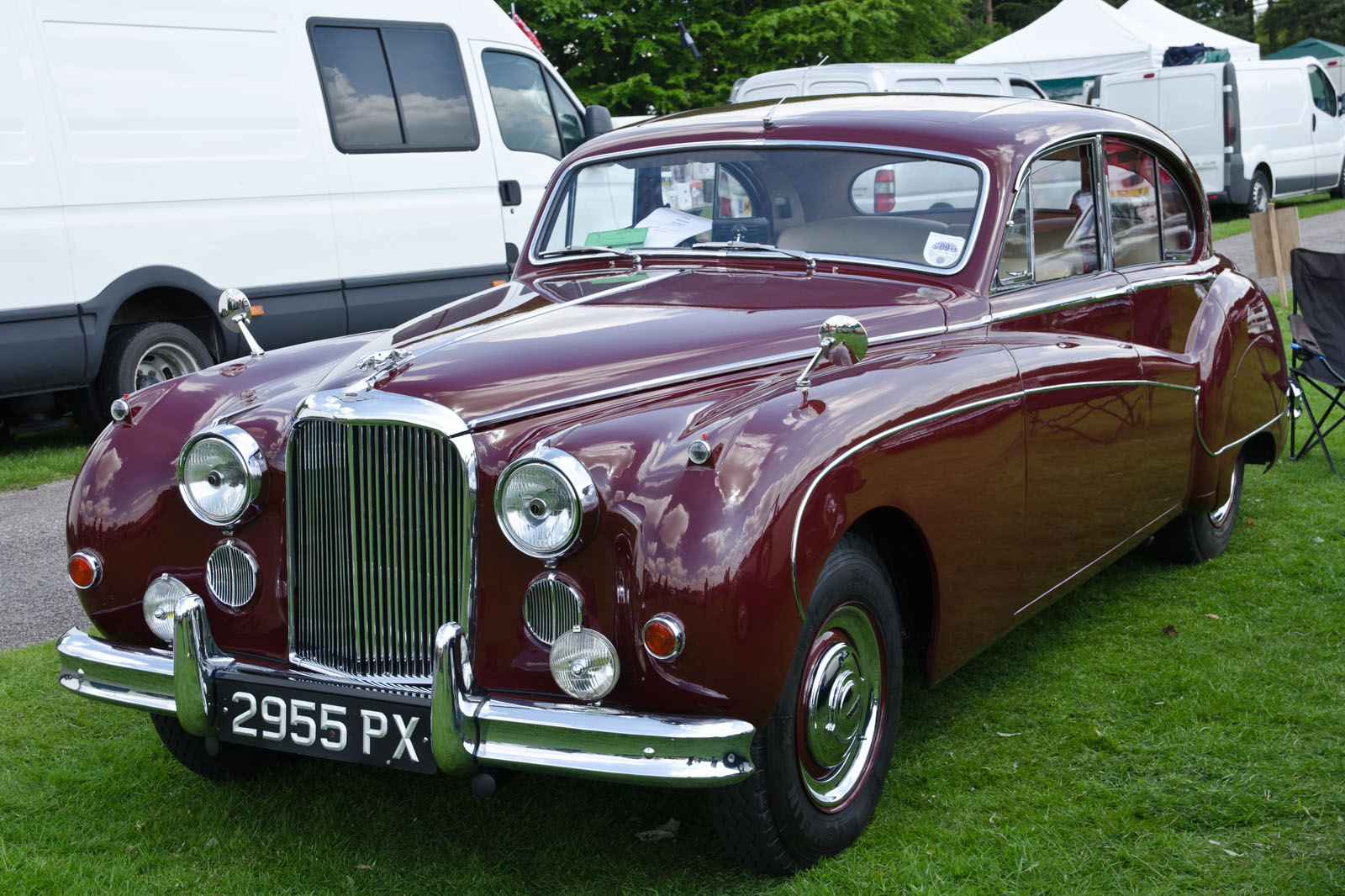

Overview
- Manufacturer: Jaguar Cars
- Production: 1958–1961; 10,009 produced
- Assembly: United Kingdom: Coventry, England

Body and chassis
- Class: Full-size luxury car (F)

Powertrain
- Engine: 3781 cc DOHC I-6

Dimensions
- Wheelbase: 120 in (3,048 mm)
- Length: 196.5 in (4,991 mm)
- Width: 75 in (1,905 mm)
- Height: 63 in (1,600 mm)
- Kerb weight: 4,000 lb (1,814 kg)

Chronology
- Predecessor: Jaguar Mark VIII
- Successor: Jaguar Mark X

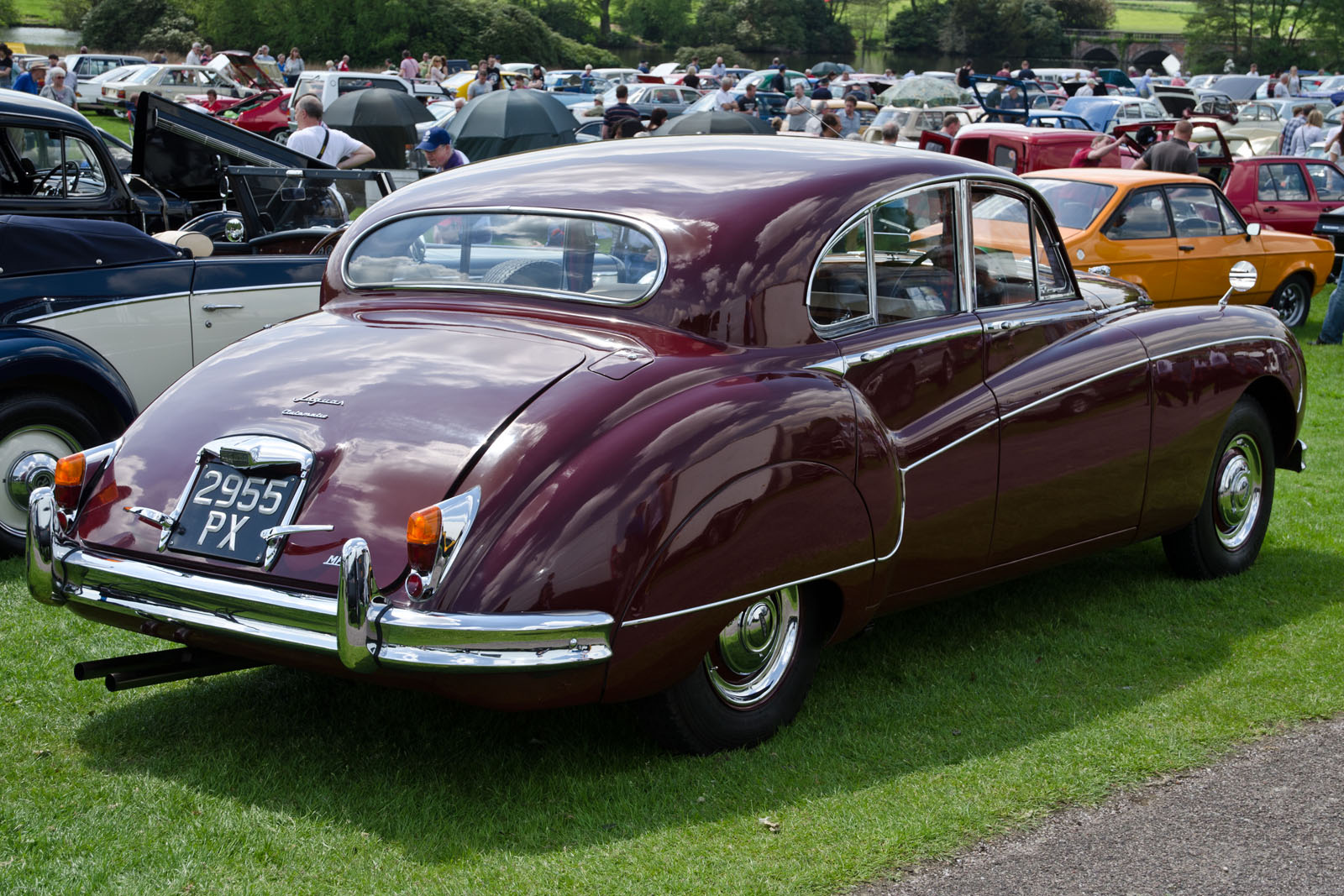
Rear

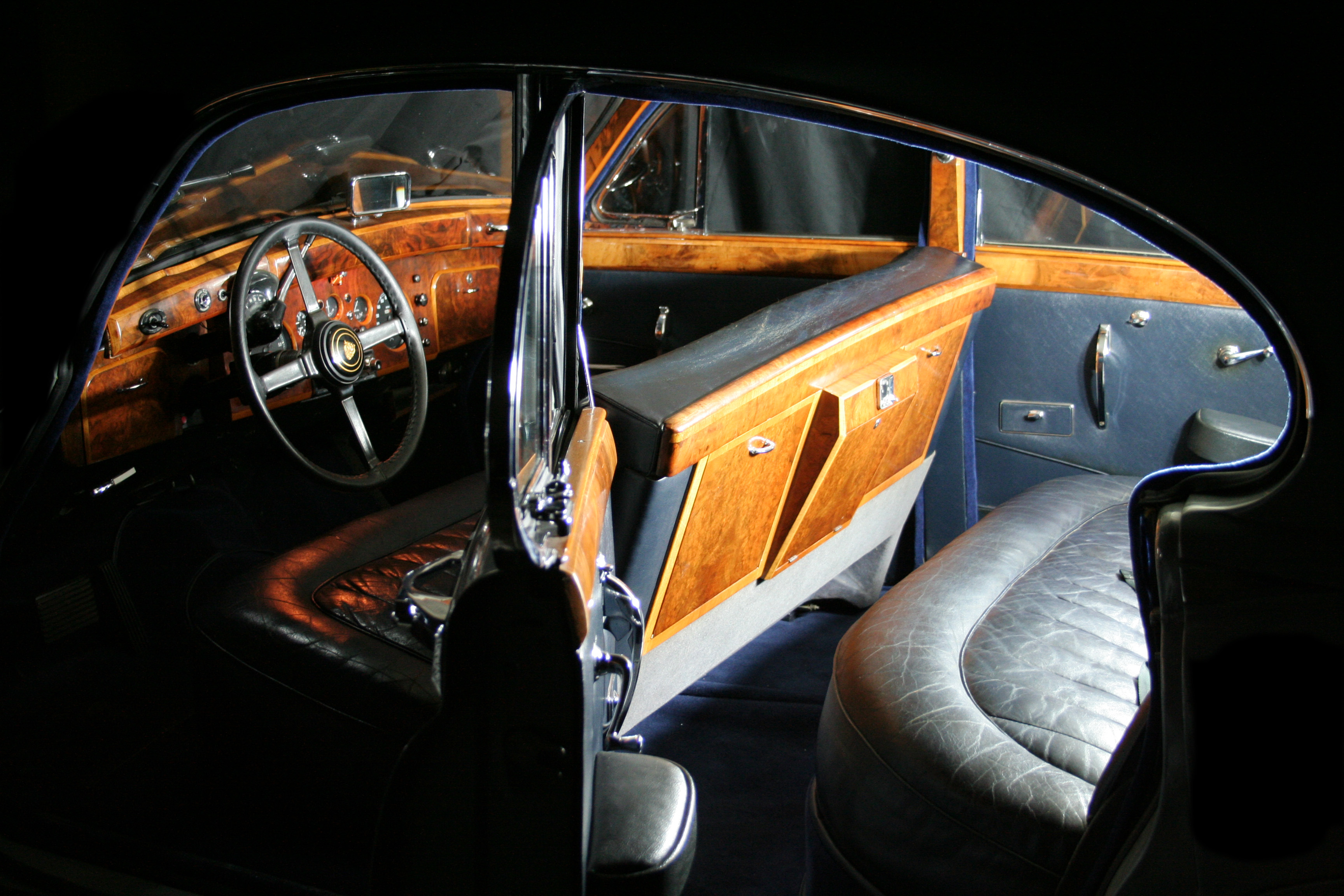
Interior

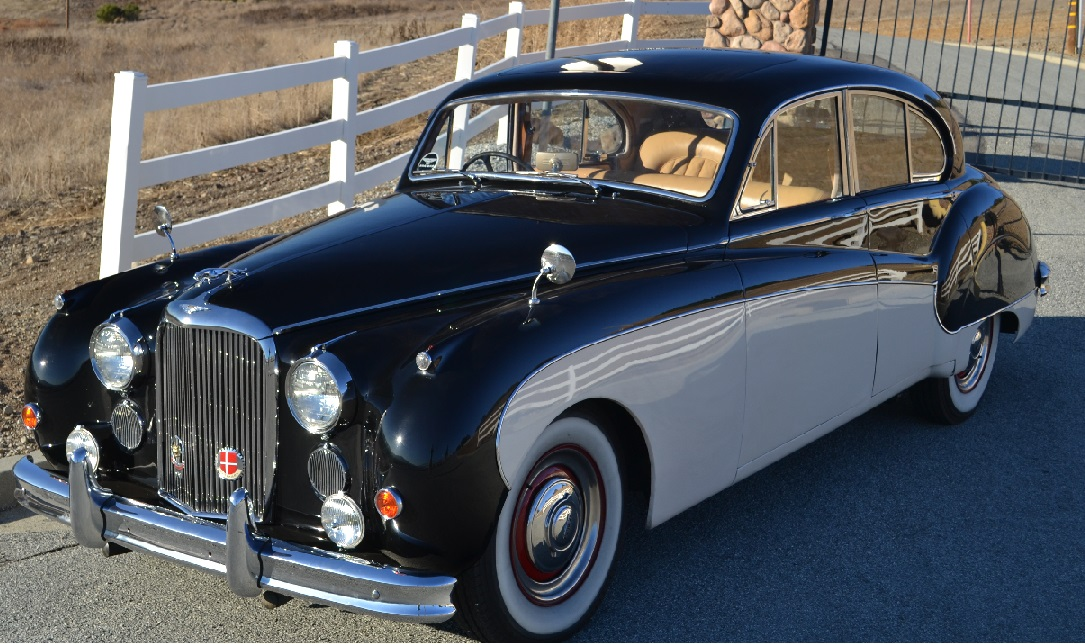
Jaguar MK-IX

The Jaguar Mark IX is a four-door luxury saloon car announced 8 October 1958 and produced by Jaguar Cars between 1958 and 1961. It was generally similar to the Mark VIII it replaced, but had a larger, more powerful 3.8 litre engine, 4-wheel disc brakes, and power assisted recirculating ball steering among its mechanical improvements.

Visually the early versions were identical in exterior appearance to the Mark VIII except for the addition of a chrome "Mk IX" badge to the boot lid. Later versions had a larger tail-lamp assembly with an amber section for traffic indication, visually similar to the tail-lights of the smaller Jaguar Mark 2.

It was replaced by the lower and more contemporary-styled Mark X in 1961.

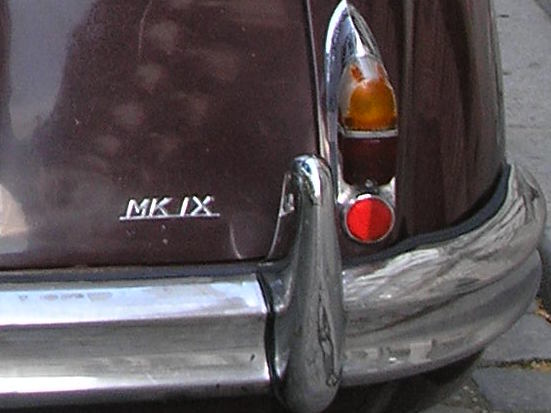
Exterior changes, later version

== Features ==
A four-speed manual system transmission was standard. Options included overdrive and a Borg Warner three-speed automatic box, the most popular choice.

Internally, an enlarged-bore 3.8 litres (232 cu in), 220 bhp (164 kW) DOHC straight-6 XK engine replaced the previous 3.4 litres (207 cu in) 190 bhp (142 kW) XK unit. The B-type head of the Mark VIII was retained, but with a chamber at the bottom of the combustion chamber to accommodate the enlarged bore. Twin HD6 1.75" SU carburettors were fitted. A smaller electromagnetically controlled auxiliary carburettor was placed between the main pair of carburettors to act as a choke. It often proved troublesome in operation and many were converted to manual switching. Standard compression ratio was 8:1, but a higher performance 9:1 compression ratio was also available, as was a 7:1 compression ratio for export markets, such as Africa, where quality of petrol was sometimes a problem.

The Mark IX was the first production Jaguar to offer four-wheel servo-assisted Dunlop disc brakes and recirculating ball power steering, which were now standard equipment. The brake system included a vacuum reserve tank to preserve braking in the event that the engine stalled. Automatic transmission were fitted with a hill-holding "anti-creep" feature, where an electromagnetic valve maintained brake pressure at rest when the brake pedal was released to prevent the car from rolling back on an incline.

The power steering was driven by a Hobourn-Eaton pump, operating at 600-650 psi. It was attached to the back of the generator and allowed the steering to be geared up to 3.5 turns lock-to-lock as against the 4.5 turns for the Mark VII and VIII models.

Unlike the early automatic Mark VII predecessor, (but like late mark VII and all Mark VIII) the Borg Warner DG automatic gearbox started in first gear and had a dash-mounted switch to allow second gear to be held indefinitely. Once in third gear, a series of clutches engaged to allow direct drive rather than through the torque converter.

The torsion bar independent front suspension and leaf-sprung rear live axle were retained from the Mk VIII, which, in turn, was first used in the 1949 Mark V.

Final drive was 4.27:1, (4.55:1 when overdrive was fitted).

The sunshine roof became a standard fitting for the UK market. The interior was luxurious, with extensive use of leather, burled walnut and deep pile carpet. A range of single and twin-tone paint schemes was offered.

== Performance ==
A car with automatic transmission tested by the British magazine The Motor in 1958 had a top speed of 114.4 mph (184.1 km/h) and could accelerate from 0–60 mph (97 km/h) in 11.3 seconds. A fuel consumption of 14.3 miles per imperial gallon (19.8 L/100 km; 11.9 mpg_{‑US}) was recorded. The test car cost £2162 including taxes of £721. In addition, the Mark IX attained 30 mph in 4.2 seconds, and 100 mph in 34.8 secs. It covered the standing quarter mile in 18.1 secs.

Autocar magazine tested a Mk IX Automatic in its Used Cars on the Road series, number 200, published in the edition dated 14 December 1962. This vehicle at the recorded mileage of around 34,000 achieved acceleration figures of 0-60 mph (97 km/h) in 10.1 secs and 0-100 mph (161 km/h) in 28.8 secs. The Standing Quarter-mile was passed in 17.6 secs.

== Sales ==
The Mark IX was popular as a state car. When Charles de Gaulle paid a state visit to Canada in 1960, the official cars for the motorcade were Mark IX Jaguars. The British Queen Mother had a Jaguar Mark VII, which was progressively upgraded to be externally identical to the later Mark IX. The Nigerian government bought forty Mark IXs, painted in state colours of green and white. The impressive Jaguars of the 1950s were sufficiently popular in western Africa that "Jagwah" survives to this day as a colloquialism for "smart man-about-town".

In the luxury car market, the Jaguar Mk IX was very competitively priced, selling for £1995 with manual gearbox, £2063 with overdrive, and £2163 with automatic transmission, which was less than about half the price of similar competitors. In all, 10,009 Mark IX were produced.

== Classic racing circuit ==
The Mark IX's power and good brakes for a vehicle of the era, together with its impressive aesthetic appearance, make it a common choice for classic car circuit racing, such as at the Goodwood Circuit's Revival meetings.
