= Mk10 =

mk10 or variant may refer to:

- Martin-Baker Mk.10, an ejection seat
- Mortal Kombat X, the 10th video game in the Mortal Kombat series
- MK10, a UK postcode in Milton Keynes, see MK postcode area
- MK10, a region code in Bogovinje Municipality, Republic of North Macedonia; see List of FIPS region codes (M–O)

== See also ==
- Mark X (disambiguation) also covering Mark 10 (Mk10)
- MKX (disambiguation)
