= F-segment =

Car size classification in Europe

2020 Best-Selling

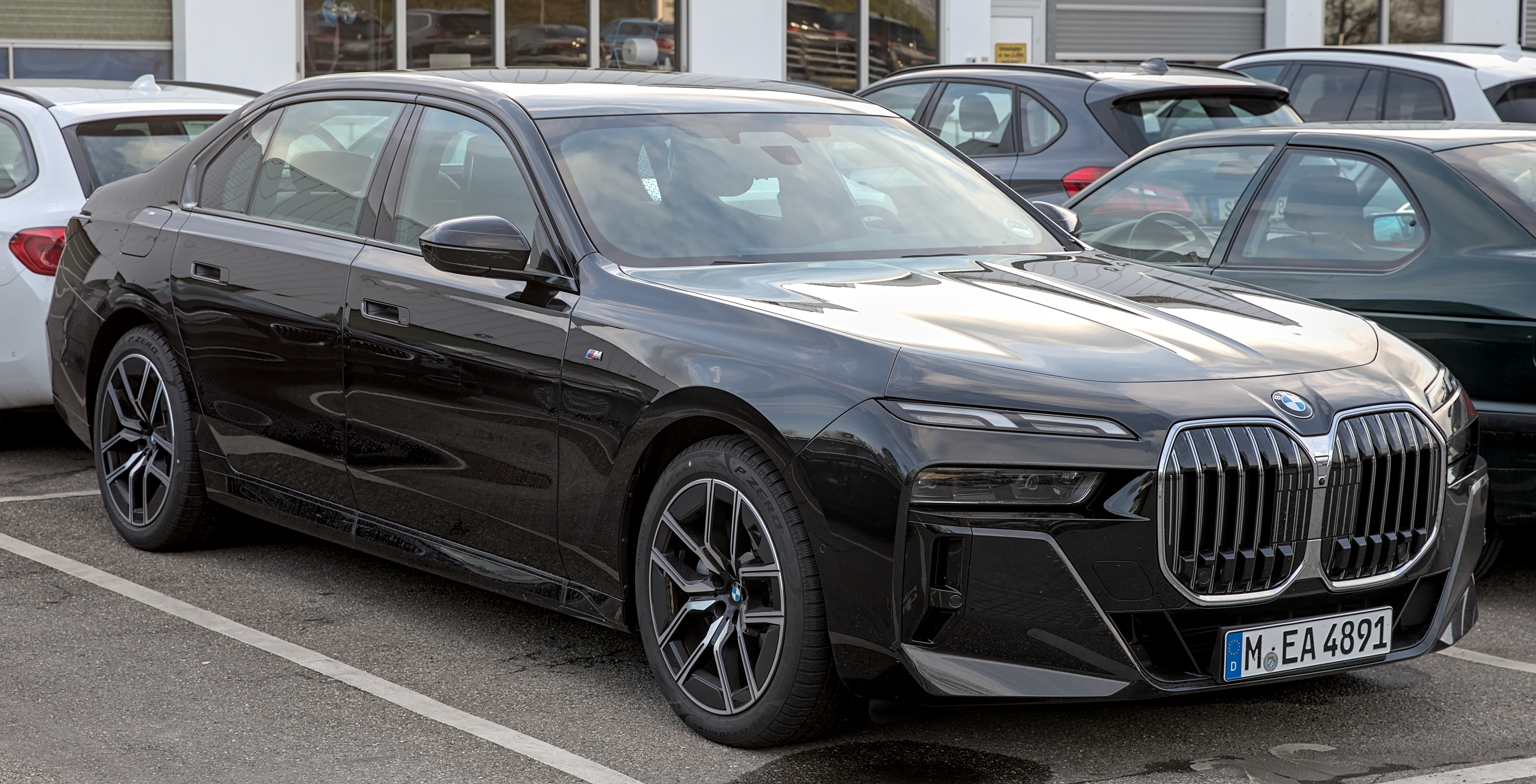
BMW 7 Series 7th generation (2022–present)

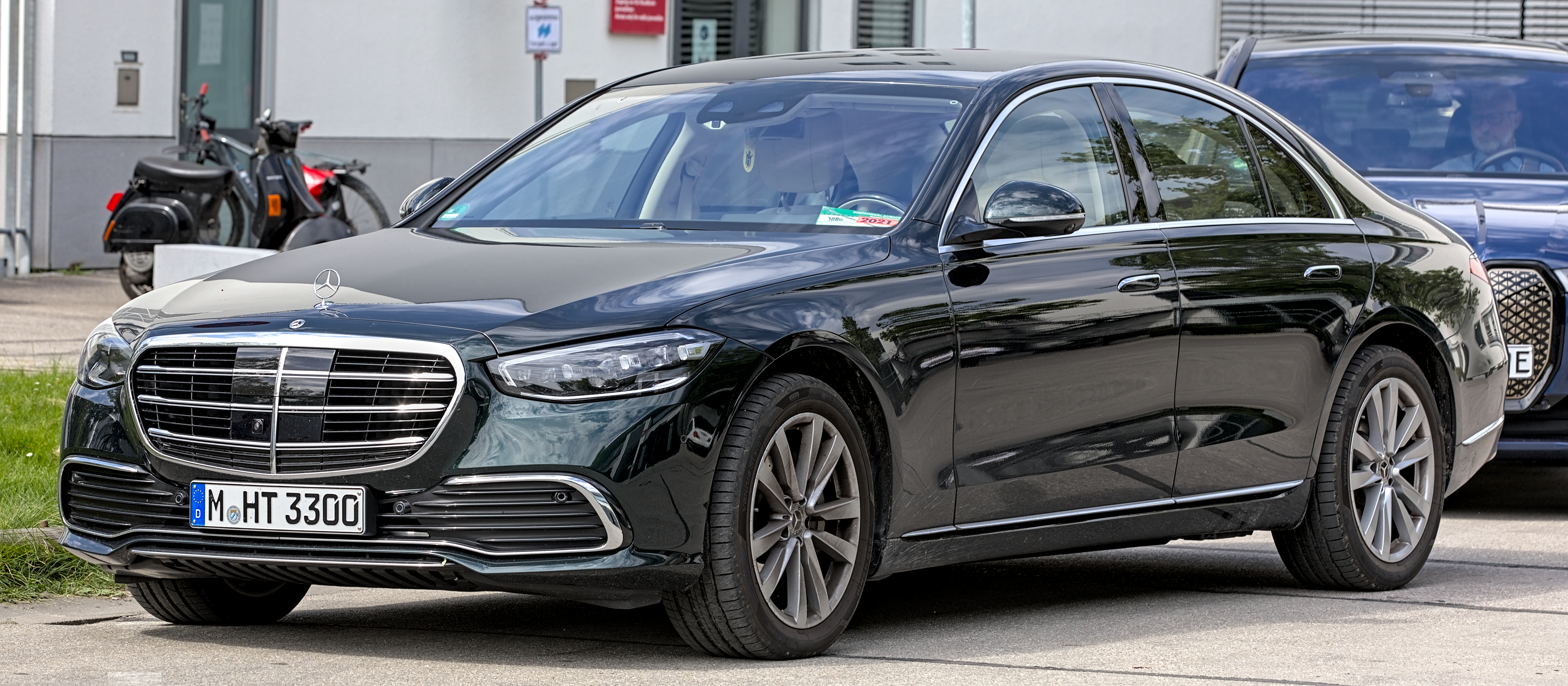
Mercedes-Benz S-Class 7th generation (2020–present)

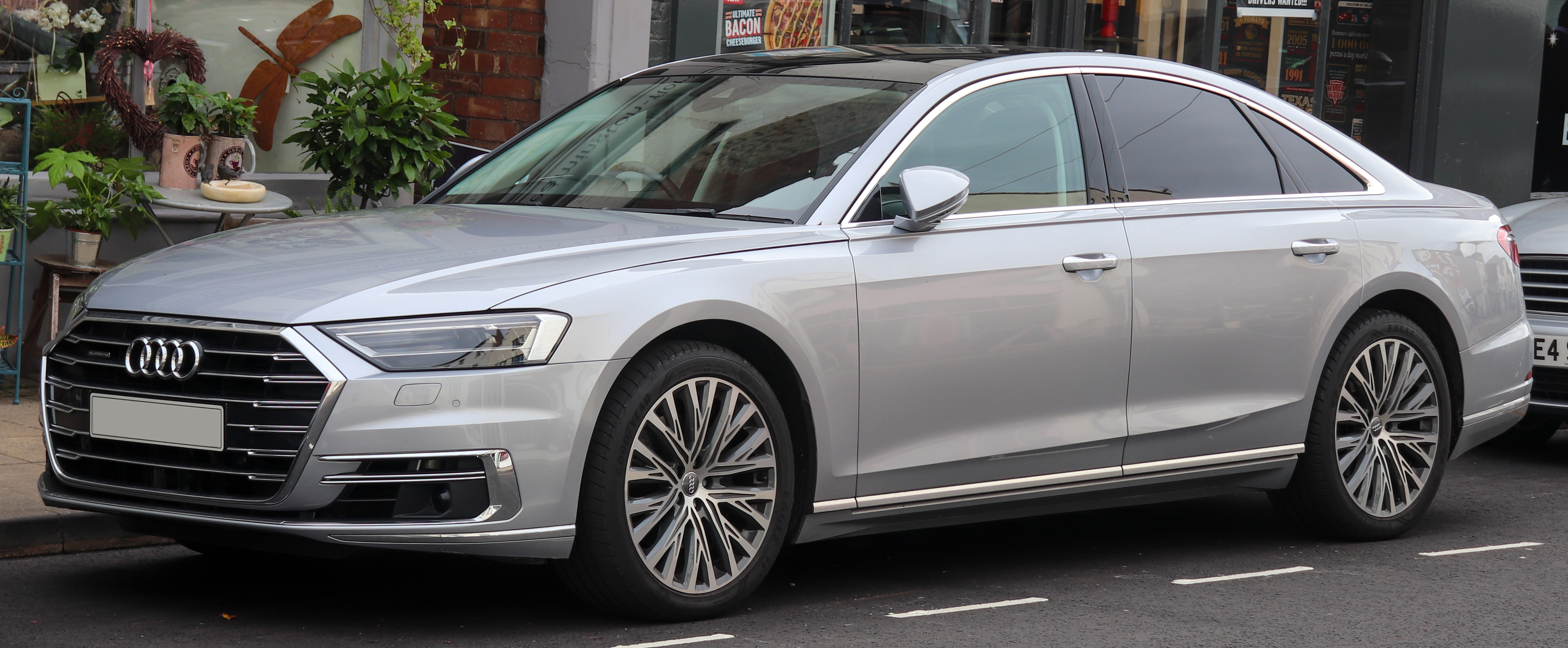
Audi A8 4th generation (2018–2026)

The F-segment is the 6th category and largest of the European segments for passenger cars, and always belongs to "luxury cars".

The equivalent categories are full-size luxury sedan (or "large luxury sedan") in the United States, luxury saloon (or "luxury limousine") in the United Kingdom, and Oberklasse in Germany. Extended-wheelbase limousines and armored sedans are also considered as F-segment.

F-segment is a niche of the European market (approximately 0.2–0.3% in the 2010s) and the range is limited to only a few models.

== Characteristics ==
Most F-segment cars use a sedan body style; however, some have been produced as wagons/estates or have a hatchback rear door.

Extended wheelbase variants of these cars are common, as many of the luxury features are placed for the rear-seat occupants. In some markets (depending on the manufacturer), short wheelbase models are excluded completely, and only long wheelbase variants are sold. As of 2021, the average F-segment car has a length exceeding 5 metres (16 ft).

Ultra-luxury cars are also included in F-segment.

== Current models ==
In 2020, the highest selling F-segment cars in Europe were the BMW 8 Series, BMW 7 Series, Mercedes-Benz S-Class, Jaguar XJ, Porsche Panamera and Audi A8 / S8.

1000–10,000 sales (best-selling)

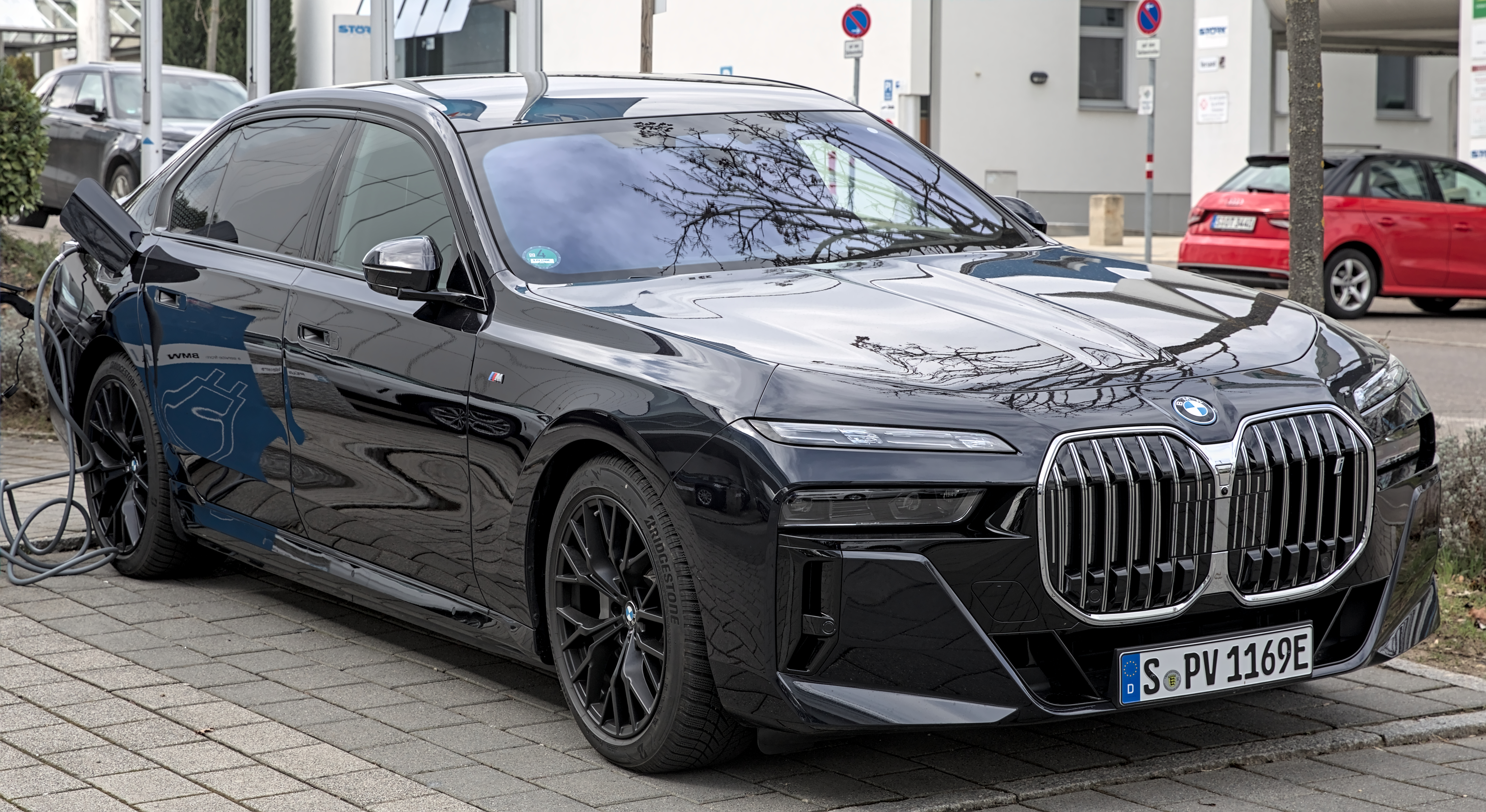
BMW 7 Series
7th generation (2022–present)

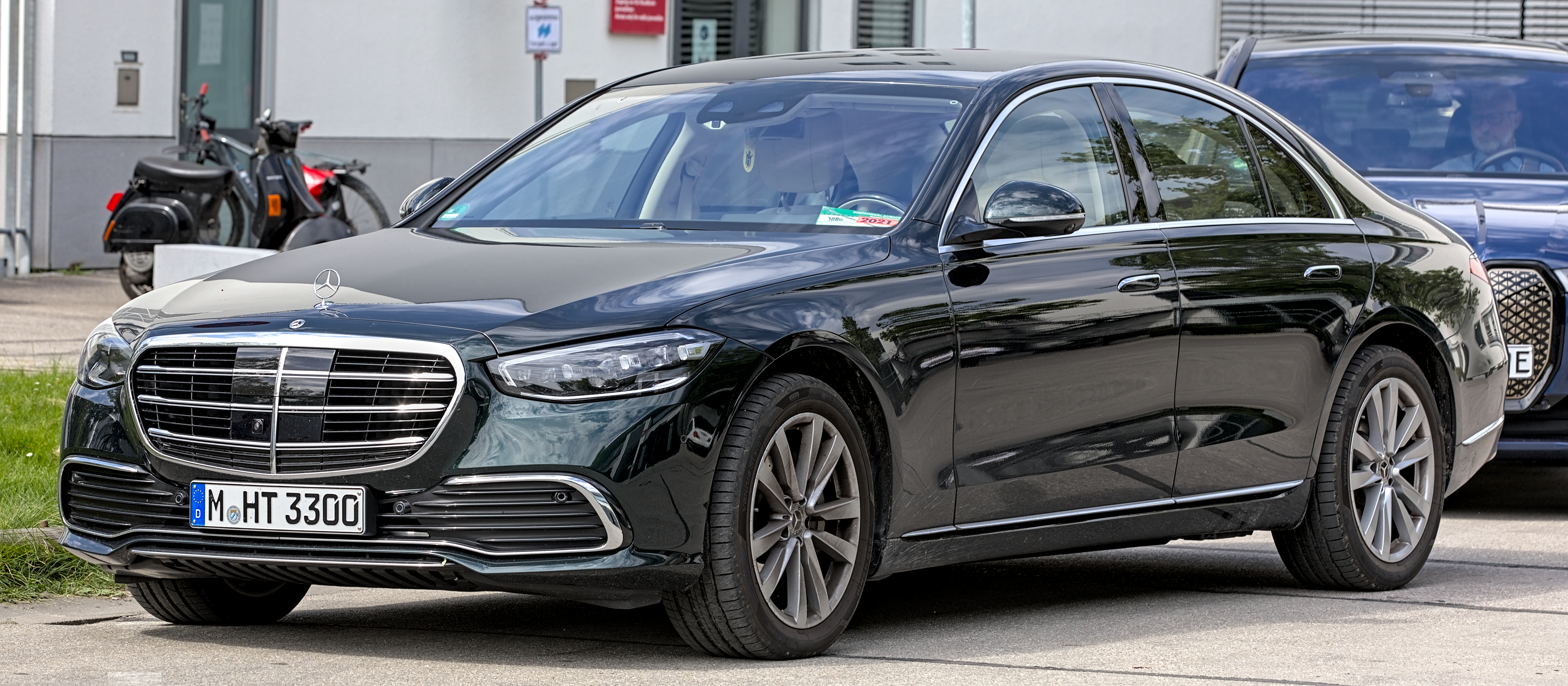
Mercedes-Benz S-Class
7th generation (2020–present)

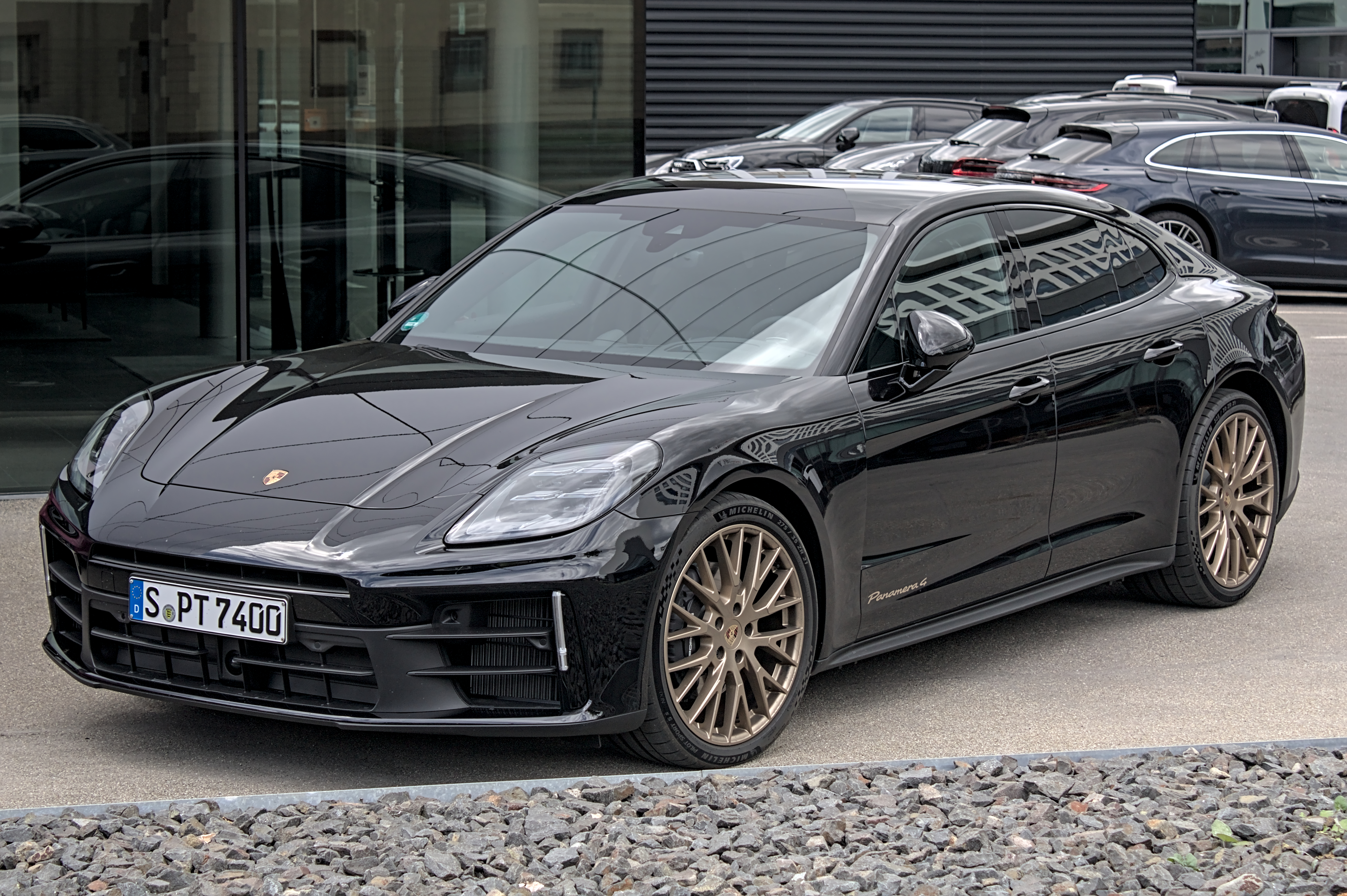
Porsche Panamera
3rd generation (2024–present)

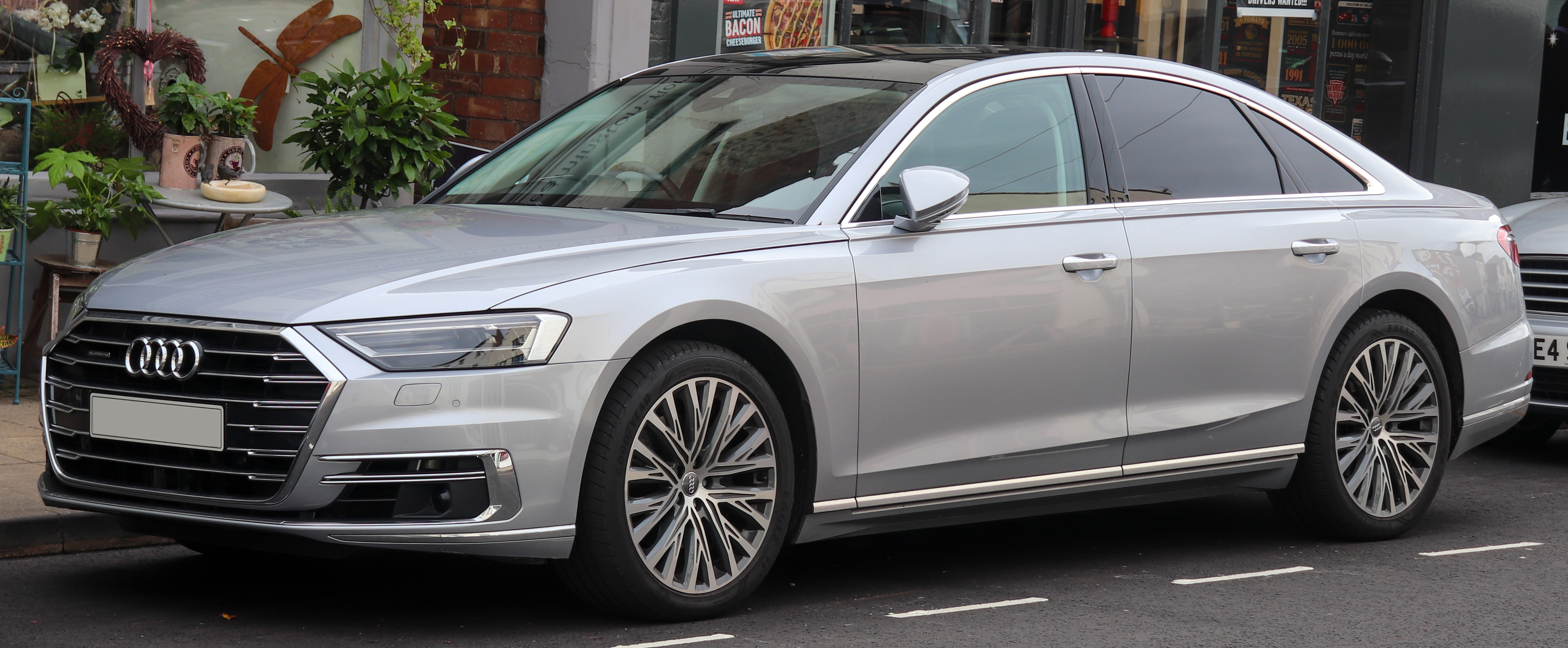
Audi A8
4th generation (2018–2026)

Fewer than 1000 sales

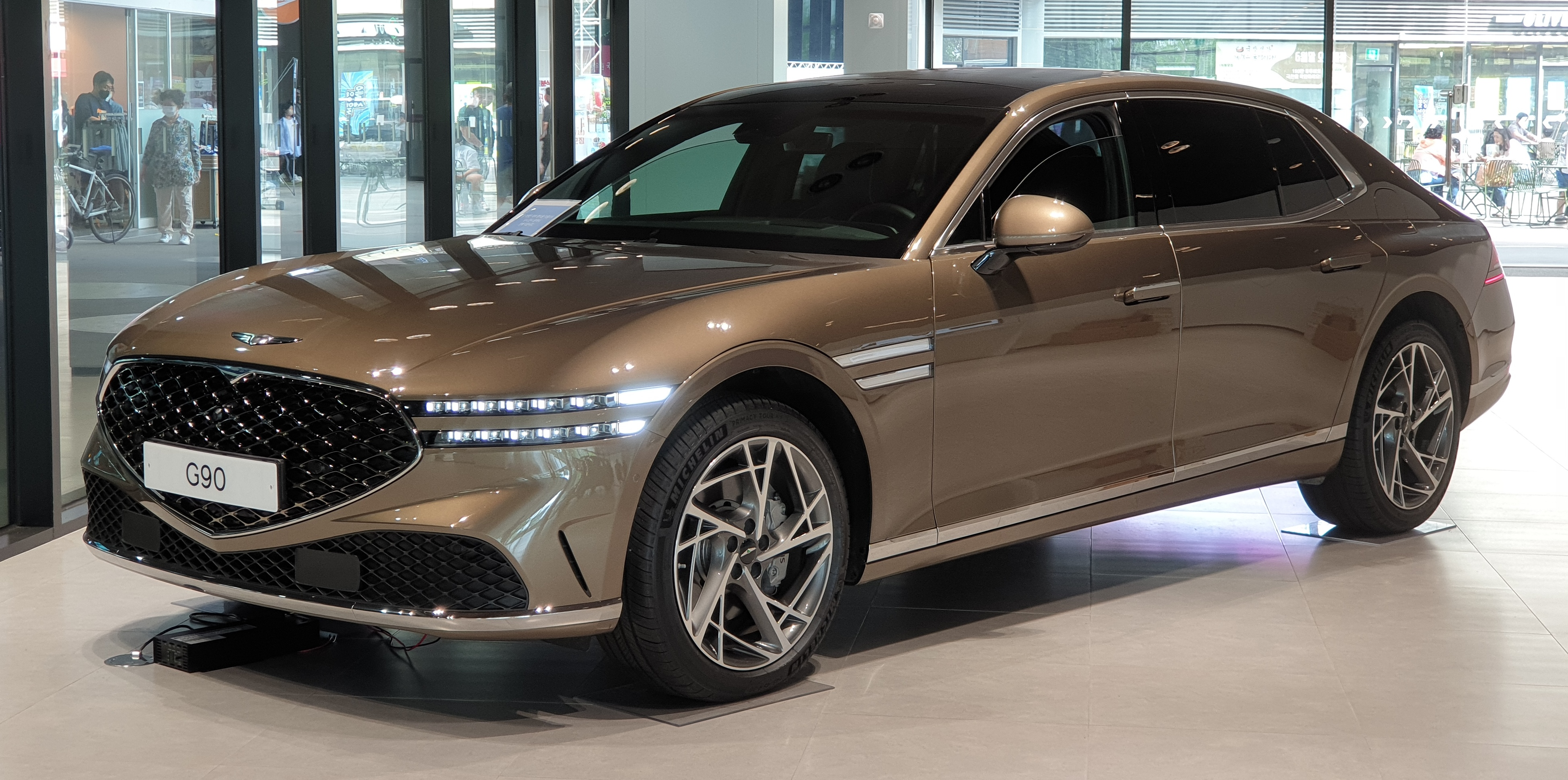
Genesis G90
2nd generation (2021–present)

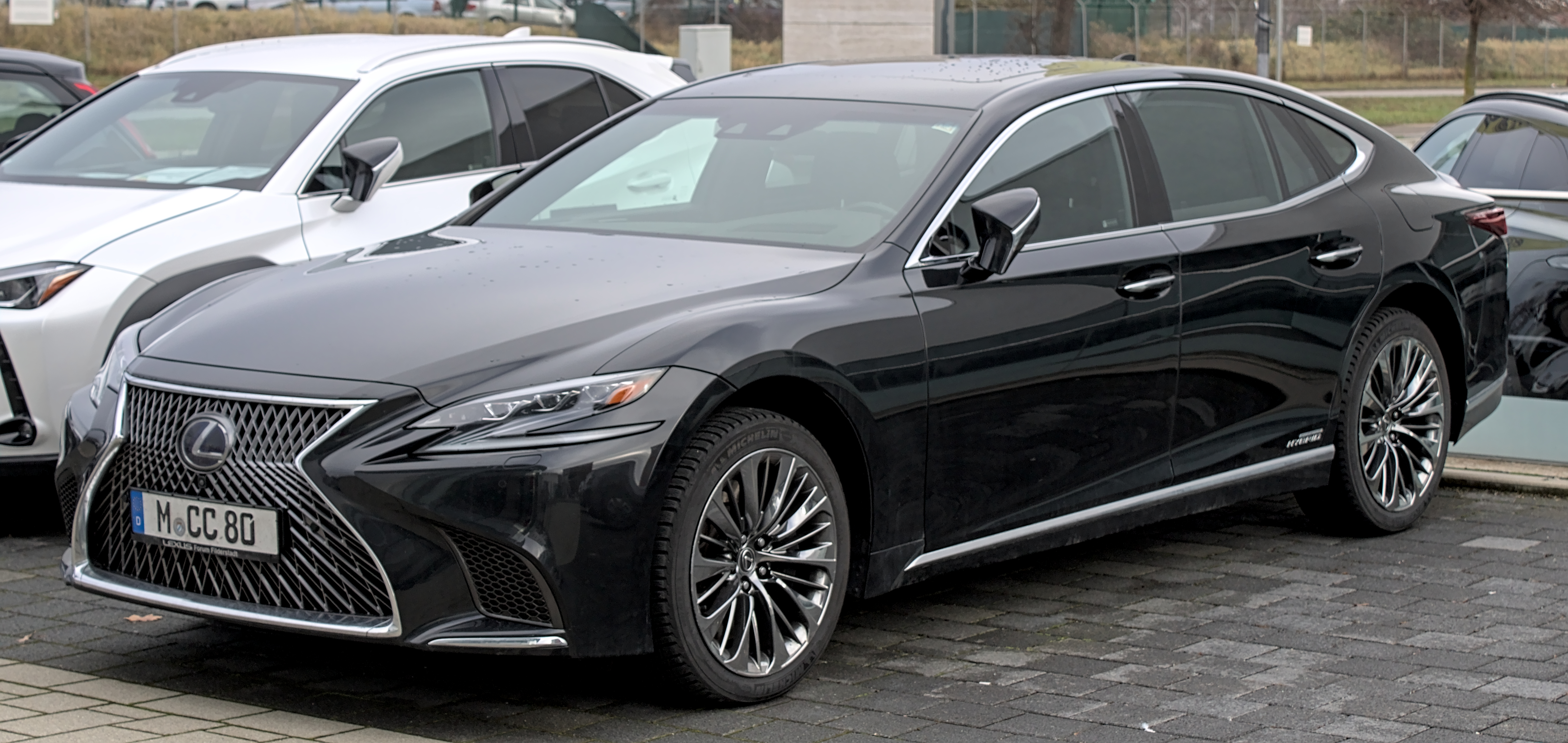
Lexus LS
5th generation (2017–2026)

Fewer than 1000 sales (ultra-luxury models)

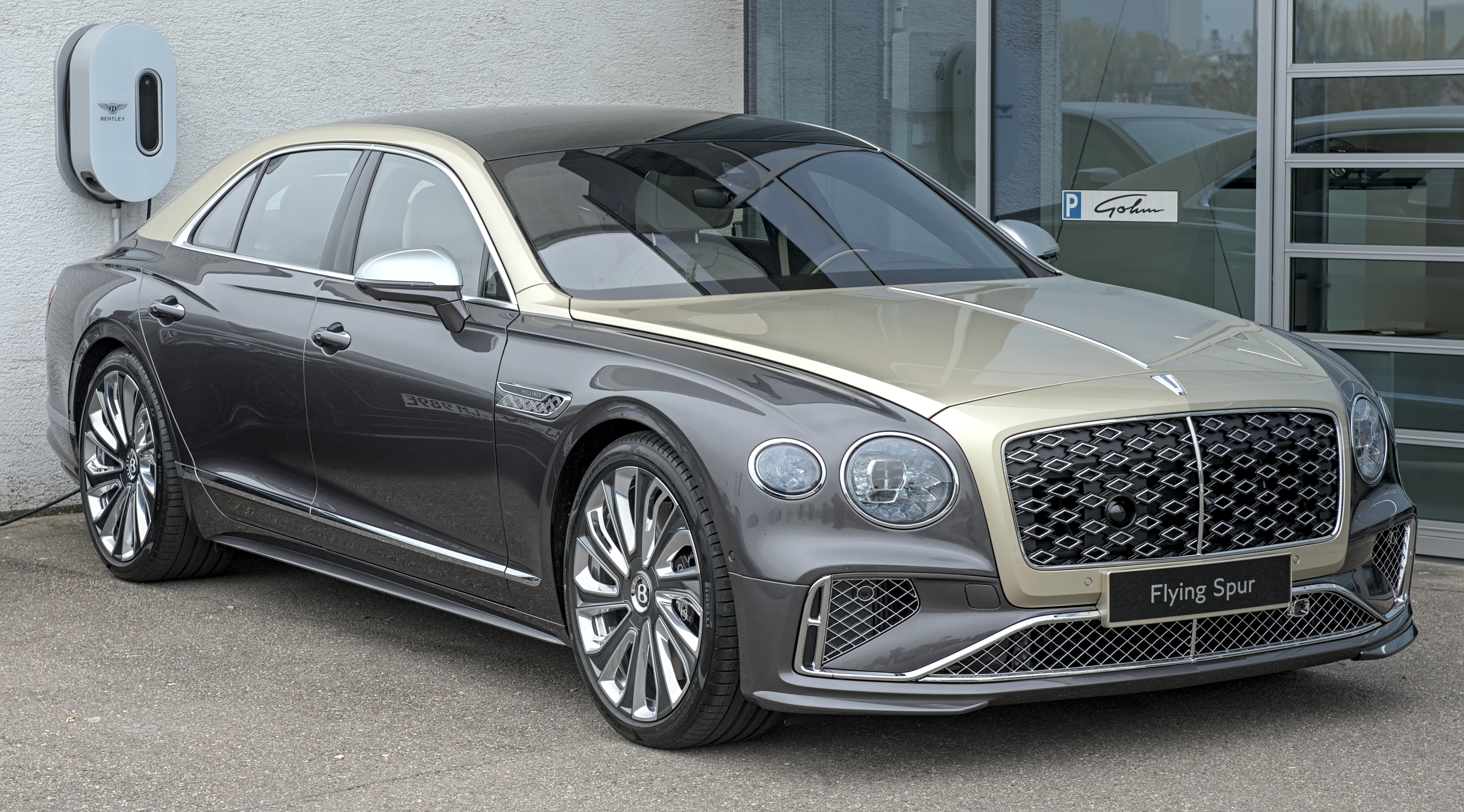
Bentley Flying Spur (2005)
3rd generation (2019–present)

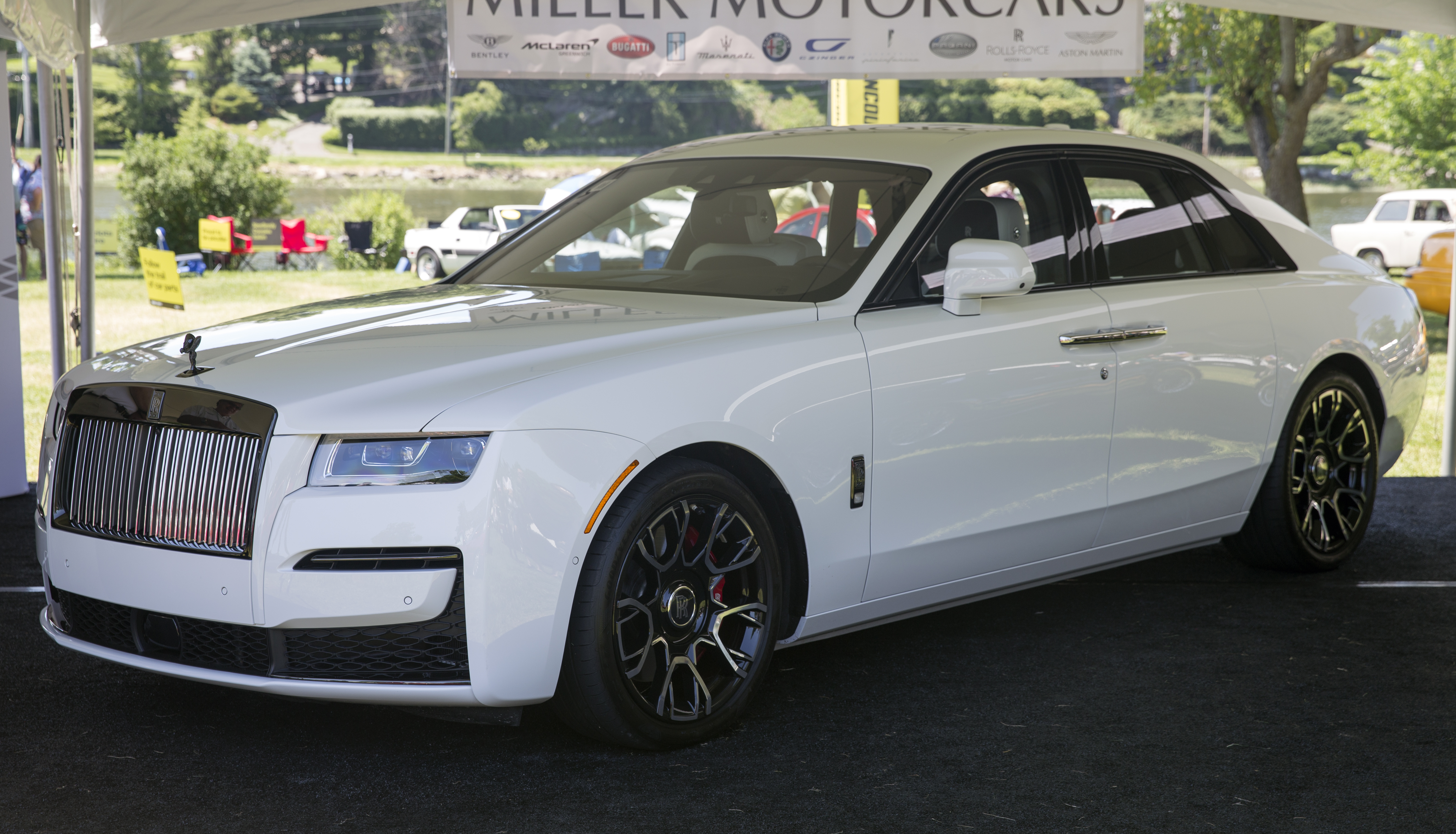
Rolls-Royce Ghost
2nd generation (2020–present)

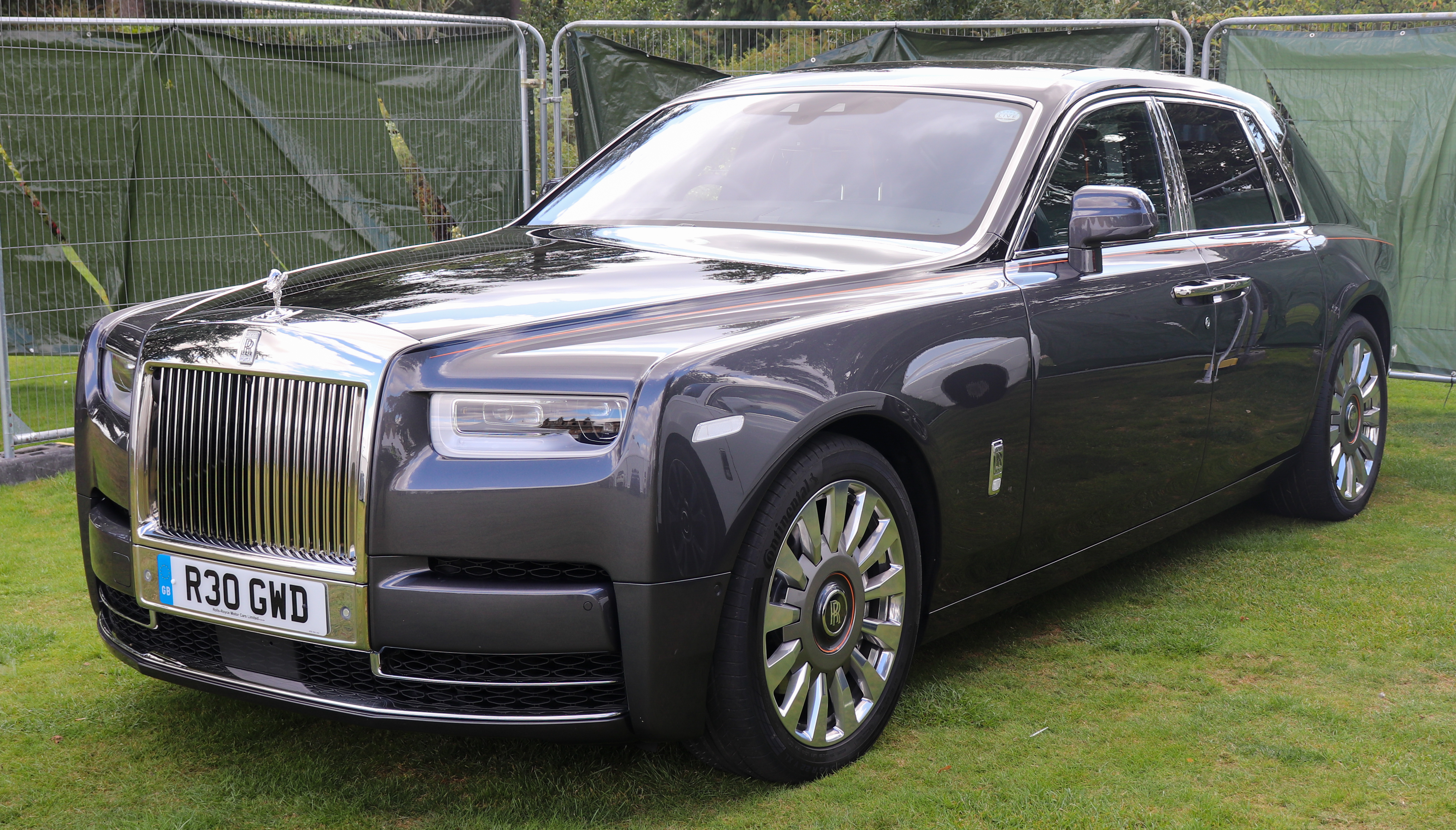
Rolls-Royce Phantom VIII
8th generation (2017–present)

== Sales figures in Europe ==
2020 rank	Brand	Model	2013	2014	2015	2016	2017	2018	2019	2020	2021	% change (2020–2021)
1	Mercedes-Benz	S-Class	8,736	17,669	16,583	14,967	14,757	14,373	10,571	6,239	11,069	▲ +77%
2	BMW	8 Series	–	–	–	–	–	1,299	6,640	7,486	5,873	▼ –22%
3	BMW	7 Series	5,980	5,307	5,985	13,320	11,533	9,552	9,248	6,346	5,235	▼ –18%
4	Porsche	Panamera	5,679	5,676	4,191	3,140	10,478	9,454	8,436	4,308	5,097	▲ +18%
5	Audi	A8 / S8 (Ceased production in 2026)	5,486	6,556	6,717	5,372	5,887	5,791	4,477	3,648	2,865	▼ –21%
6	Mercedes-Benz	EQS	–	–	–	–	–	–	–	–	1,027	New
7	Bentley	Flying Spur	313	624	555	627	637	359	54	438	451	▲ +3%
8	Rolls-Royce	Ghost	255	189	233	180	166	113	92	89	186	▲ +109%
9	Lexus	LS (Ceased production in 2026)	370	173	131	83	101	636	248	98	117	▲ +19%
10	Maserati	Quattroporte (Ceased production in 2023)	452	812	815	682	562	459	251	116	115	▼ –1%
11	Rolls-Royce	Phantom	120	105	97	124	95	171	100	46	41	▼ –11%
12	Bentley	Mulsanne (Ceased production in 2020)	156	185	209	227	186	108	112	69	19	▼ –72%
13	Genesis	G90	–	–	–	–	–	–	–	–	16	New
14	Jaguar	XJ (Ceased production in 2020)	2,287	1,905	1,616	1,847	1,495	1,099	724	247	11	▼ –96%
–	Aston Martin	Rapide (Ceased production in 2020)	250	165	197	108	124	74	86	34	–	▼ –100%
Segment Total			31,877	41,127	38,807	40,754	45,928	42,189	41,039	29,164	32,122	▲ +10%
Source												

== Market share in Europe ==
2019 - Sales of limousines in Europe were down 6% in 2019 to just over 41,000 sales which makes this the second consecutive year of decline for the segment.

2020 - European sales of limousines and upper class vehicles were down 29% in 2020, to just over 29,000 deliveries. This lowers their share to 0.2% of the total European car market, down from 0.3% the year before.

== Asia ==
In China, Hongqi CA72 was launched in 1958, making it the oldest Chinese F-segment car.

The first F-segment car from an Asian manufacturer for an outside market was the 1989 Lexus LS400. Before the debut of luxury orientated Japanese manufacturers such as Lexus or Infiniti, most flagship models were limited for Japan only. Examples included the Toyota Century and Nissan President.

In South Korea, early F-segment cars were the result of partnerships with long-established manufacturers, for example the 1999 Hyundai Equus (based on the Mitsubishi Proudia/Dignity). More recent F-segment cars from South Korea include the Genesis G90.

== Europe ==
The lineage of Mercedes-Benz's current F-segment car begins with the 1951 Mercedes-Benz W187. The W187 was replaced by the Mercedes-Benz W180 (nicknamed "Ponton") in 1954, which was replaced by the Mercedes-Benz W111 in 1959, which was replaced by the Mercedes-Benz W108 in 1965. The W108 was replaced by the Mercedes-Benz S-Class in 1972, which has been produced for six generations and remains in production today.

Jaguar's first F-segment car was the 1951 Jaguar Mark VII. The Mark VII was replaced by the 1956 Jaguar Mark VIII, then the 1959 Jaguar Mark IX and the 1961 Jaguar Mark X, which was renamed the "Jaguar 420G" in 1966. The 420G was replaced by the Jaguar XJ in 1968, which has been produced for four generations and has just ceased production in 2020.

The 1952–1963 BMW 501/502 sedans are predecessors to BMW's current line of F-segment cars. The successor to the 501/502 was the BMW New Six (also known as E3), introduced in 1968. The E3 was replaced by the BMW 7 Series in 1978, which has been produced for six generations and remains in production today.

The Maserati Quattroporte was released in 1963 and is currently in its sixth generation.

The first F-segment car from Audi was the 1988 Audi V8. The Audi V8 was replaced by the Audi A8 in 1994, which has been produced for four generations and remains in production today.

== United States ==
F-segment cars are known as "full-size luxury cars" in the United States, and form part of the full-size car category (along with non-luxury large cars and the smaller E-segment cars).

== See also ==
- E-segment
- Full-size car
- Euro Car Segment
- Car classifications
- Limousine
- Luxury car
