= Jaguar Mark VIII =

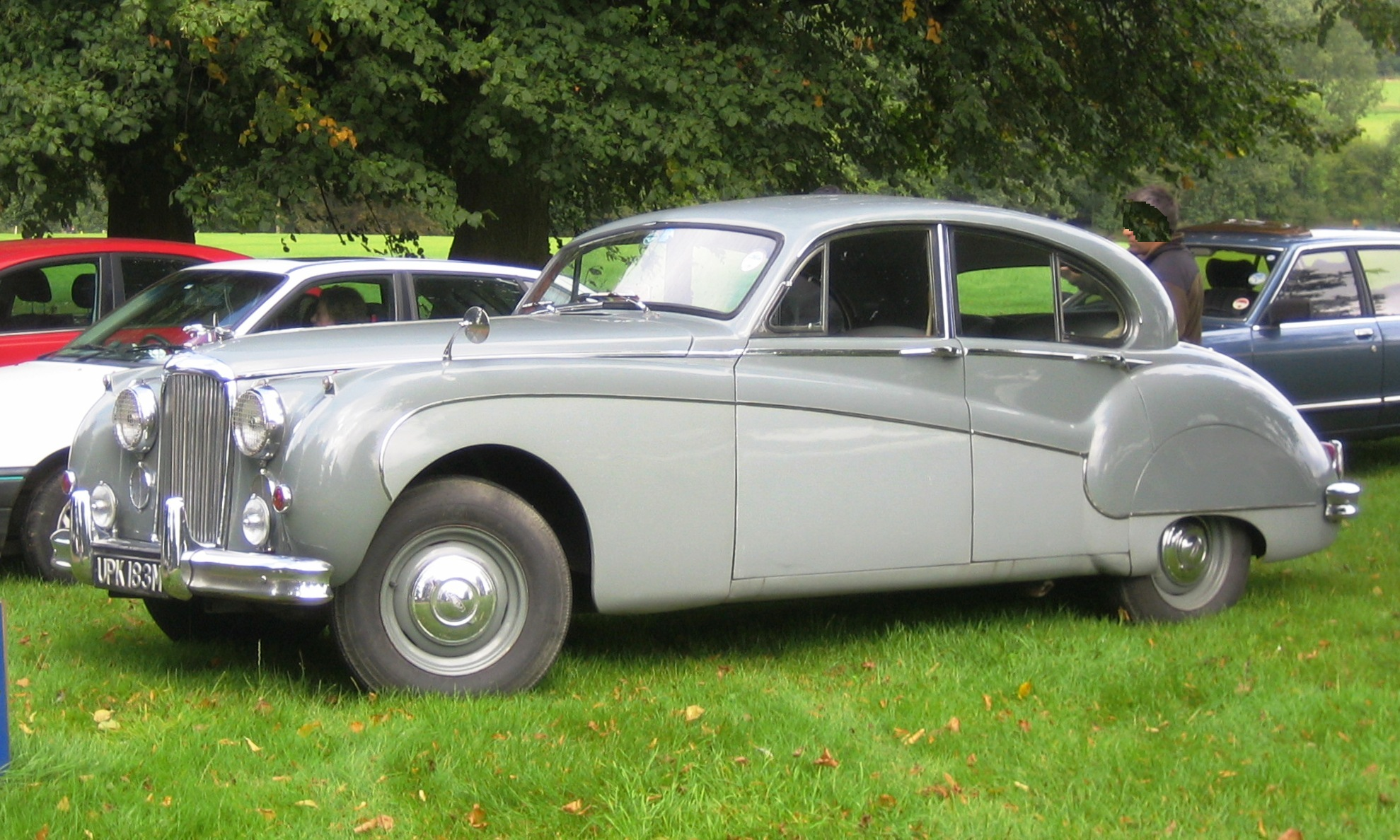

Overview
- Manufacturer: Jaguar Cars
- Production: 1956–1958; 6,227 produced
- Assembly: United Kingdom: Coventry, England

Body and chassis
- Class: Full-size luxury car (F)
- Body style: 4-door sedan

Powertrain
- Engine: 3442 cc, 210 bhp (156.6 kW)

Dimensions
- Wheelbase: 120 in (3,048 mm)
- Length: 196.5 in (4,991 mm)
- Width: 73 in (1,854 mm)
- Kerb weight: 3,752 lb (1,702 kg)

Chronology
- Predecessor: Jaguar Mark VII M
- Successor: Jaguar Mark IX

The Jaguar Mark VIII is a luxury four-door automobile introduced by the Jaguar company of Coventry at the 1956 London Motor Show. It succeeded the Jaguar Mark VII M, made from 1950 to 1956, and was replaced by the Mark IX in late 1958, made until 1961.

== Styling ==
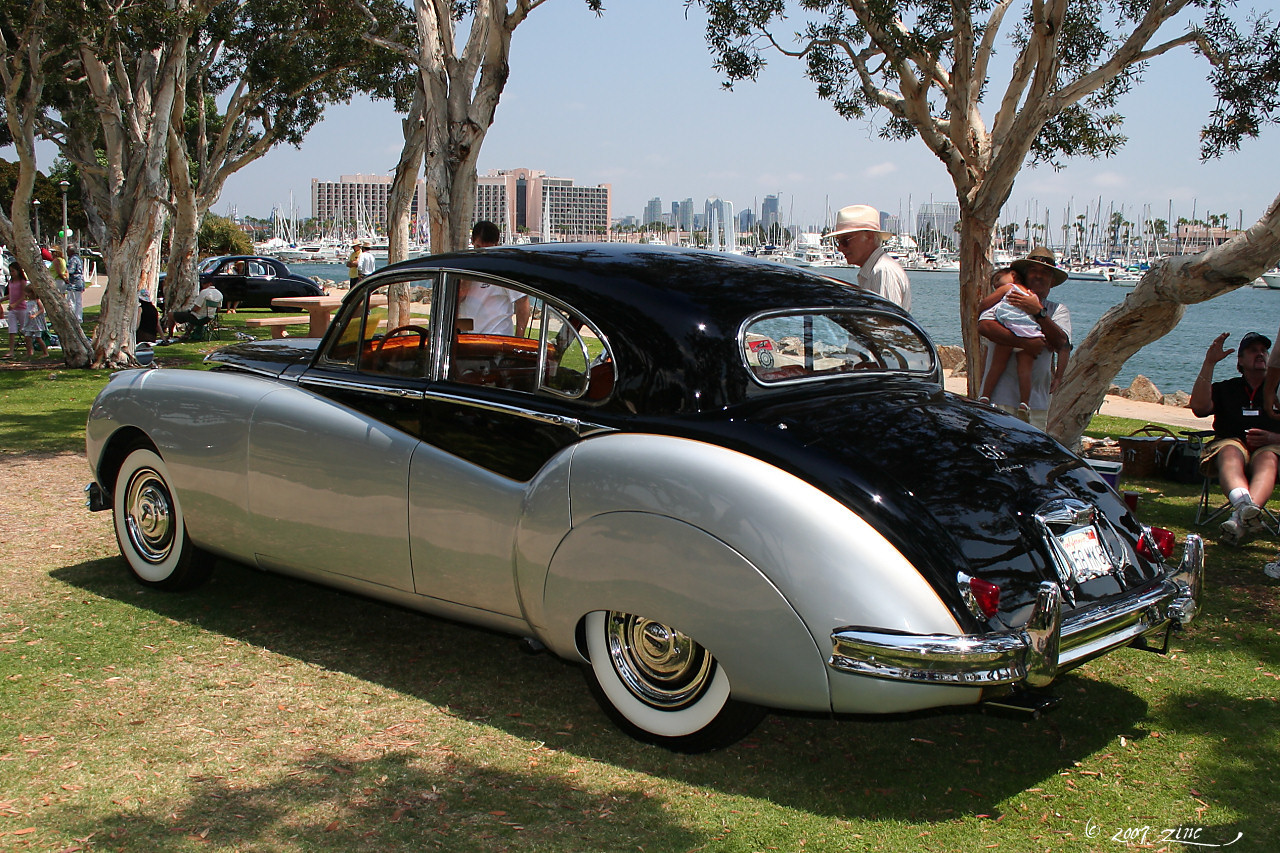
1958 Jaguar Mark VIII rear

The car shared its 10-foot (3.05 m) wheelbase with its predecessor, the Jaguar Mark VII M, which outwardly it closely resembled. The most obvious change was a new curved one-piece windscreen. Distinguishing visually between the models is facilitated by changes to the front grille and a curved chrome trim strip below the waistline which allowed the factory to offer a variety of two-tone paint schemes. In addition the new car had rear spats that were cut back to display more of the rear wheels. The interior fittings were more luxurious than those of the Mark VII M.

== Engine and running gear ==
The Mark VIII inherited from its predecessor the 3442 cc straight-six engine which it shared with the Jaguar XK140 that appeared two years earlier. In the Mark VIII, a modified cylinder head known as the 'B' type was used. Although introduced subsequent to the 'C' type competition head (as used on the C-Type racer and available as an option on the XK 140) this naming made more sense than might at first appear. The 'B' type head used the larger valves of the 'C' type head, with the smaller intake port diameter of original XK cylinder head that had been introduced on the MK VII, which was now referred to as the 'A' type. The combination of larger valves with the original intake port diameters allowed faster gas flow at low and medium speeds to promote better low and medium range torque. As the MK VIII was not likely to be revved as high as the C-Type racers and the XK 140's equipped with the 'C' type head the reduction in flow at high rpm's was not seen to be a disadvantage.

Engines equipped with the 'A' type head were advertised at 160 bhp (119.3 kW); the MK VIII with the 'B' type head were advertised at 190 bhp (141.7 kW), and engines with the 'C' type head at 210 bhp (156.6 kW). The 'B' type head was painted a light green on the 3.4 litre engines to identify it ( mid-blue on the later mark IX with 3.8 litre engine ) .

The modified head supported by twin SU carburetors, and employing a manual four-speed transmission, meant that advertised engine output was now increased to 190 bhp (141.7 kW): the claimed top speed in excess of 106 mph (170 km/h) was considered impressive, given the car's bulk. Transmission options included overdrive or a Borg Warner three-speed automatic box.

== Production ==
After a two-year production run of 6,227 units the Mark VIII was replaced by the Jaguar Mark IX.

== Motor sport ==
A Mark VIII, crewed by Dunning and Cash, won first place in the Automatic Transmission class in the 1958 Australian Mobilgas Economy Run, which was a fuel economy contest in which cars were required to cover 1,224 miles in two and a half days.
