= Jaguar Mark X =

Jaguar Mark X & 420G
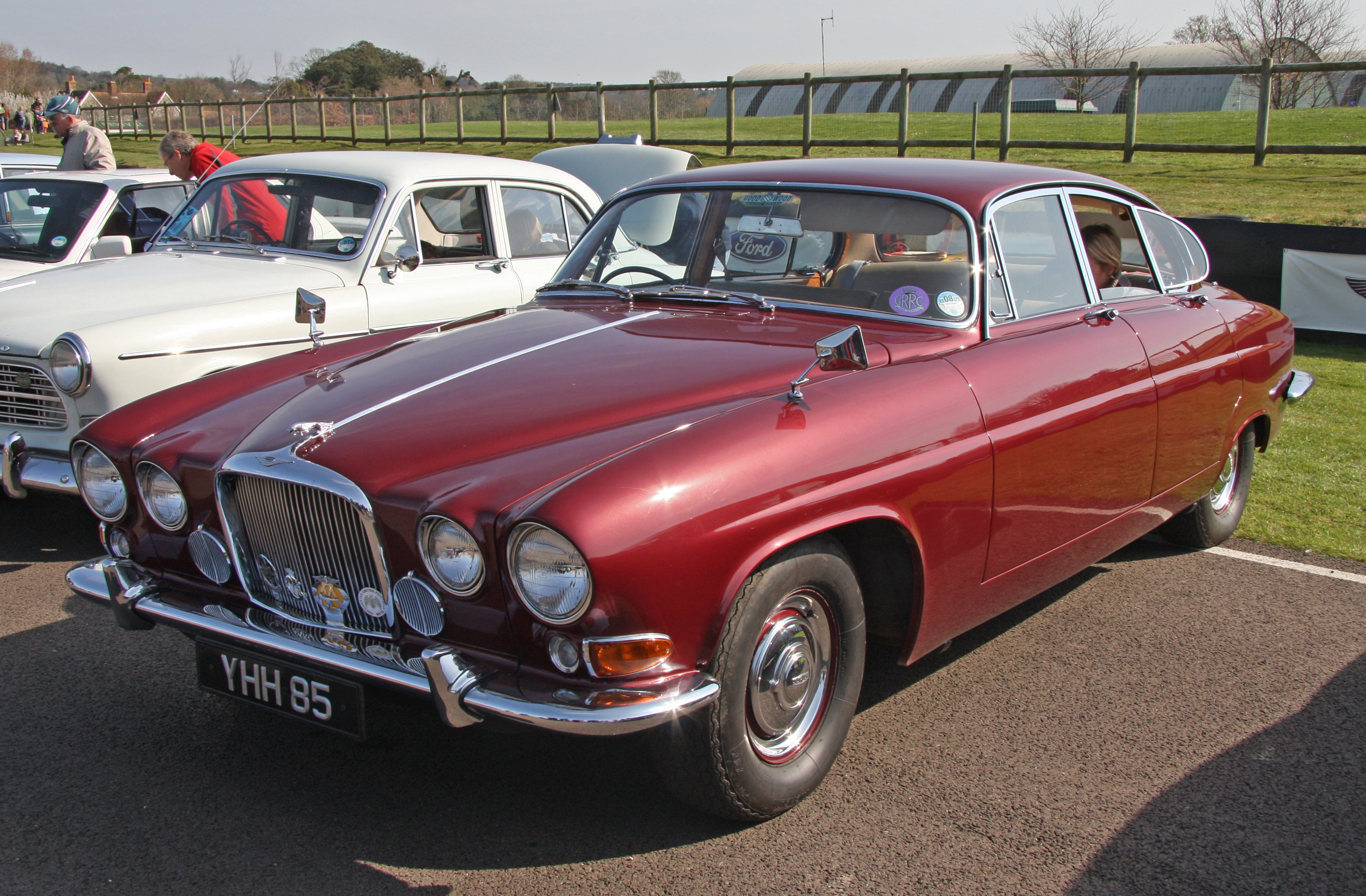
- Jaguar Mark X

Overview
- Manufacturer: Jaguar Cars
- Production: 1961–1970: 3.8 Litre: 13,382; 4.2 Litre: 5,137; 420G: 5,763
- Assembly: United Kingdom: Coventry, England

Body and chassis
- Class: Full-size luxury car (F)
- Body style: 4-door saloon
- Layout: FR layout
- Related: Daimler DS420

Powertrain
- Engine: 3,781 cc (230.7 cu in) XK I6 (until 1965); 4,235 cc (258.4 cu in) XK I6 (from 1964)
- Transmission: 3-speed automatic gearbox; 4-speed manual box with overdrive

Dimensions
- Wheelbase: 120 in (3,048 mm)
- Length: 202 in (5,131 mm)
- Width: 76.3 in (1,938 mm)
- Height: 54.5 in (1,384 mm)
- Kerb weight: 4,200 lb (1,900 kg)

Chronology
- Predecessor: Jaguar Mark IX
- Successor: Jaguar XJ6 (smaller)

The Jaguar Mark X (Mark Ten), later renamed the Jaguar 420G, is a large, luxury saloon car manufactured by British automaker Jaguar Cars between 1961 and 1970. It succeeded the Mark IX as the top of its range, but broke radically with its predecessors in both styling and technology.

From an industrial design viewpoint, the ponton-shaped Mark Ten was a hallmark car for Jaguar by introducing the upright, often slightly forward leaning front fascia and grille, flanked by prominent quad round headlights. When Jaguar replaced its entire saloon range with a more compact single new model in the late 1960s, the resulting XJ6 of 1968 used the Mark Ten as a template.

Similar front grille and quad round headlight facias defined most of Jaguar's saloons for nearly half a century, until 2009 – the final year of both the 3rd generation XJ series, and of the Jaguar X-Type. Also, Jaguar did not build another car as large as the Mark Ten & 420G for the rest of the century, until the LWB version of the 2003 XJ Jaguars.

Introduced within a year of Jaguar's E-Type sportscar, the Mark X copied much of the E-Type's technology and specifications. In contrast to its predecessors, the car employed modern styling and technology, with integrated unitary bodywork (the largest in the UK at the time), four-wheel disc brakes, and Jaguar's independent rear suspension with inboard brakes, unprecedented for early 1960s British luxury cars. Combined with the 3.8-litre, triple carburetor engine as fitted to the E-type, it gave the Jaguar Mark X the capability of handling a top speed of 120 mph (193 km/h) at less than half the price of the contemporary Rolls-Royce Silver Cloud.

Despite press acclaim from both sides of the Atlantic and Jaguar's hopes to appeal to heads of state, diplomats, and film stars, primarily aimed at the large, affluent U.S. market, the Mark X never achieved its sales targets. The rarest now is the Mark X with the 4.2 Ltr engine as only 5,137 were built and few are known to survive.

== Body ==
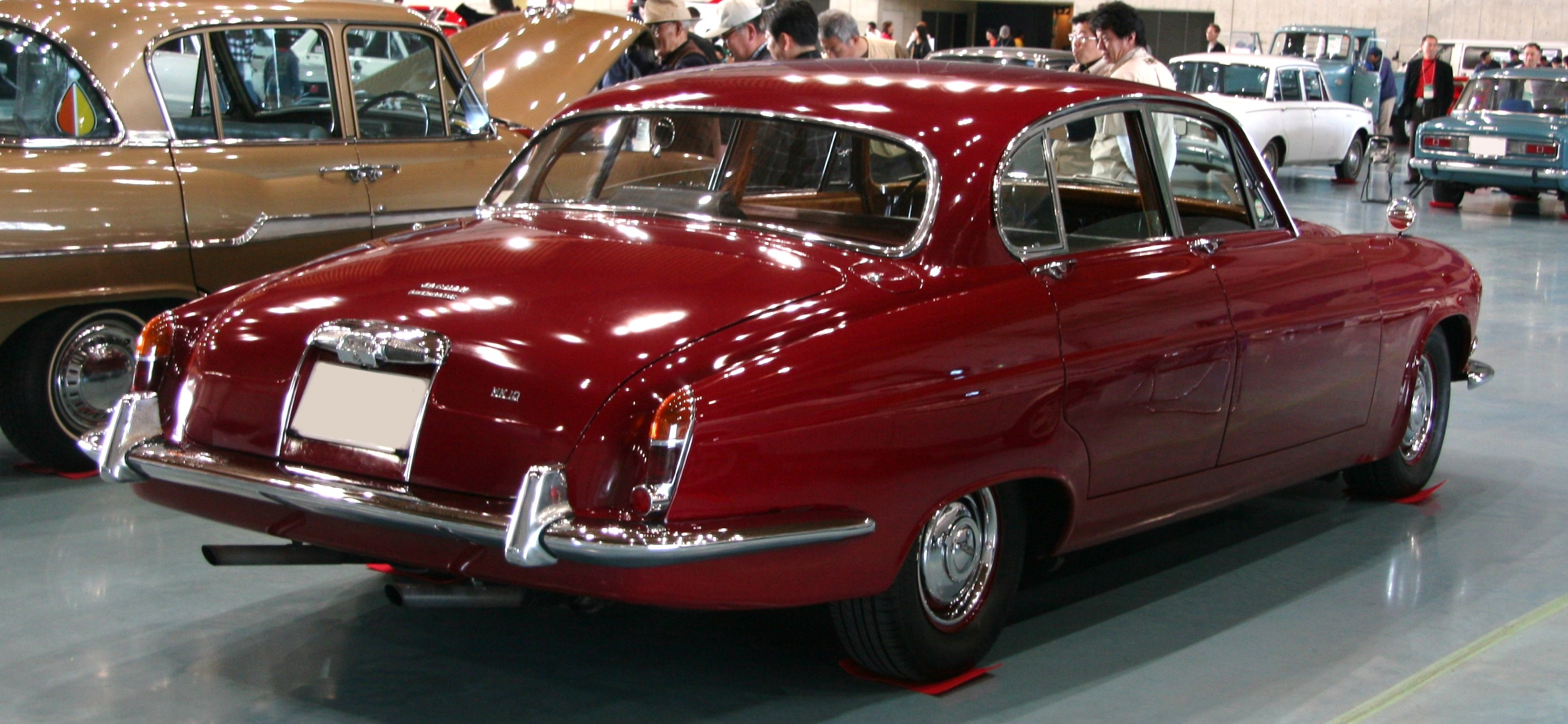
Jaguar Mark X rear

In 1961, the Mark X introduced a new upright, and slightly forward-leaning nose design for Jaguar saloons, with four headlamps set into rounded front wings (derived from Daimler DK400), and a vaned grille. This front-end style reappeared on many of the manufacturer's successive saloons, up to and including the X-Type and third generation Jaguar XJ, both through 2009—thereby forging Jaguar saloons' look for almost half a century.

Instead of relying on body-on-frame construction, like its predecessors and most of its competitors, the Mark X received a unitary body-shell, codenamed "Zenith" during its development. Its floorpan remained in production in elongated form, long after Mark X production ended, forming the basis of the Daimler DS420 Limousine until 1992. But at the same time, the interior was Jaguar's last to feature abundant standard woodwork, including the dashboard, escutcheons, window trim, a pair of large bookmatched fold out rear picnic tables, and a front seat pull-out picnic table stowed beneath the instrument cluster.

Later, air conditioning and a sound-proof glass division between the front and rear seats were added as options. The substantial doors required helical torsion springs inside the door pillars to enable them to be opened from the inside with an acceptably low level of effort.

From its introduction in mid-October 1961 until the arrival in 1992 of the low-slung XJ220 sports car, the Mark X stood as one of the widest production Jaguars ever built. Asked in 1972 if he thought the Mark X had grown rather too large, Jaguar chairman William Lyons, agreed that it "definitely" had: he opined that the then recently introduced and notably more compact Jaguar XJ6 was, by contrast an "ideal size".

== Mechanical ==
The Mark X was the first Jaguar saloon to feature independent rear suspension designed by William Heynes, who was Jaguar's Technical Director and Chief Engineer. It differed from earlier large Jaguar saloons in having 14" wheels instead of the more common 15". It used a wider-track version of Jaguar's IRS unit first seen on the E Type, which was subsequently used on Jaguar vehicles until X308 production ended in 2003. The front suspension used double wishbones with coil springs and telescopic dampers.

Power initially came from the E-type's version of Jaguar's 3781 cc XK in-line six-cylinder engine designed by W Heynes, developing either 250 bhp (186 kW) or 265 bhp (198 kW), depending on compression ratio. A 9:1 compression ratio was standard, but an alternative 8:1 compression ratio was available as an option. For the London Motor Show in October 1964 the enlarged 4,235 cc unit took over, although the 3.8-litre unit could still be specified until October 1965. Triple SU carburettors were fitted, fed from an AC Delco air filter mounted ahead of the right hand front wheel.

Transmission options were manual, manual with overdrive, or automatic . The arrival of the 4.2-litre power unit coincided with the introduction of a newly developed all-synchromesh four-speed gear box, replacing the venerable box inherited by the 3.8-litre Mark X from the Mark IX, which had featured synchromesh only on the top three ratios. Many domestic market cars and almost all cars destined for the important North American markets left the factory with a Borg Warner automatic gear-box. The 4.2-litre engine's introduction was also marked by a transmission upgrade for buyers of the automatic cars, who saw the Borg Warner transmission system switched from a DG to a Type 8 unit. The power train was completed by a Thornton Powr-Lok limited-slip differential.

Stopping power for this heavy car came from power-assisted four-wheel disc brakes, the rear units being mounted inboard alongside the differential. (Note: This reduced the unsprung weight on the rear wheels by as much as 86 kg (190 lb), compared to the old rigid, driven rear axle. Versions of Jaguar's IRS were used through 2006, and even in the Aston Martin DB7.)

Power-assisted steering was standard, the later 4.2 cars receiving Marles Varamatic Bendix (Adwest) variable ratio steering boxes, designed by an Australian, Arthur Bishop.

== 420G ==
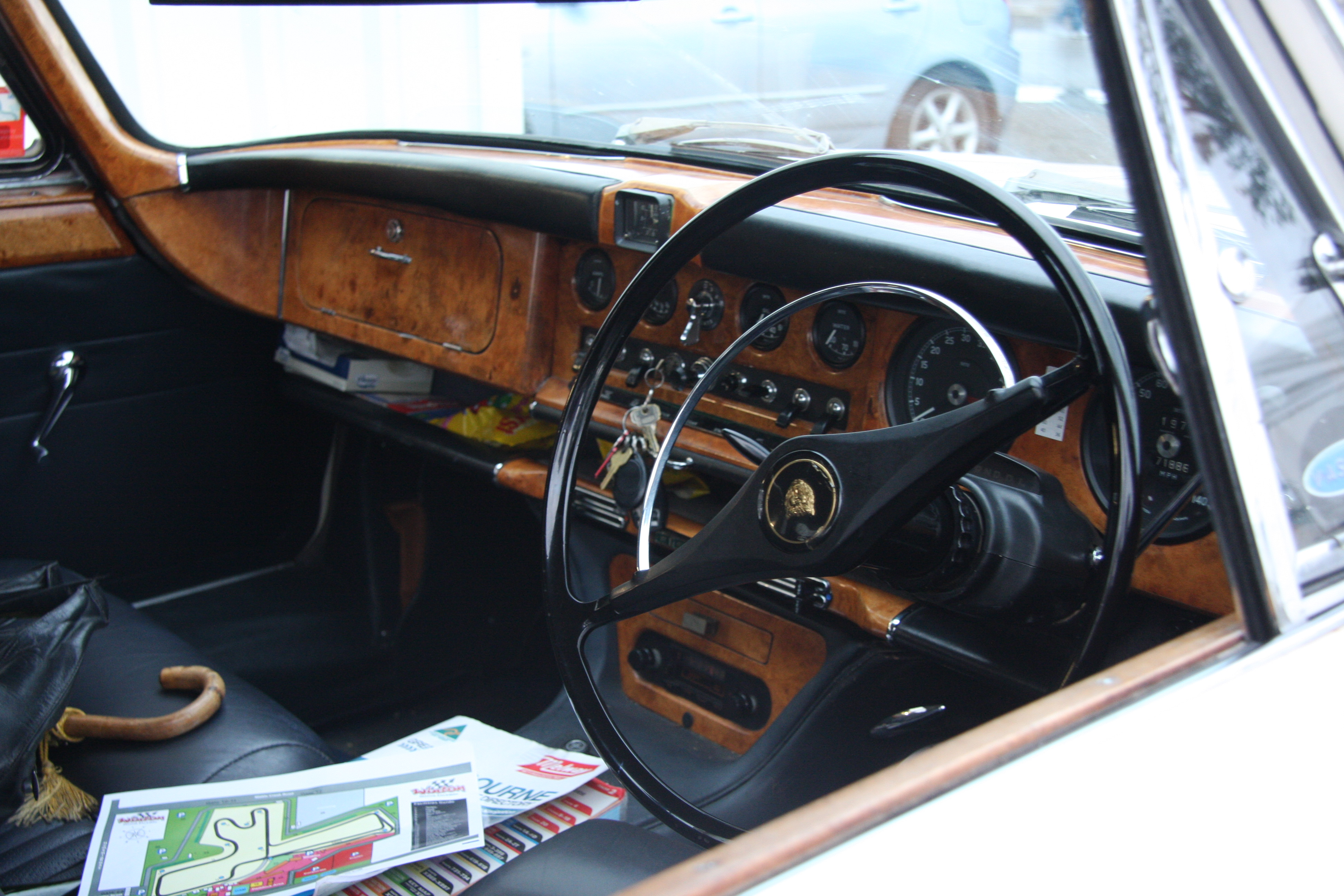
1967 Jaguar 420G interior

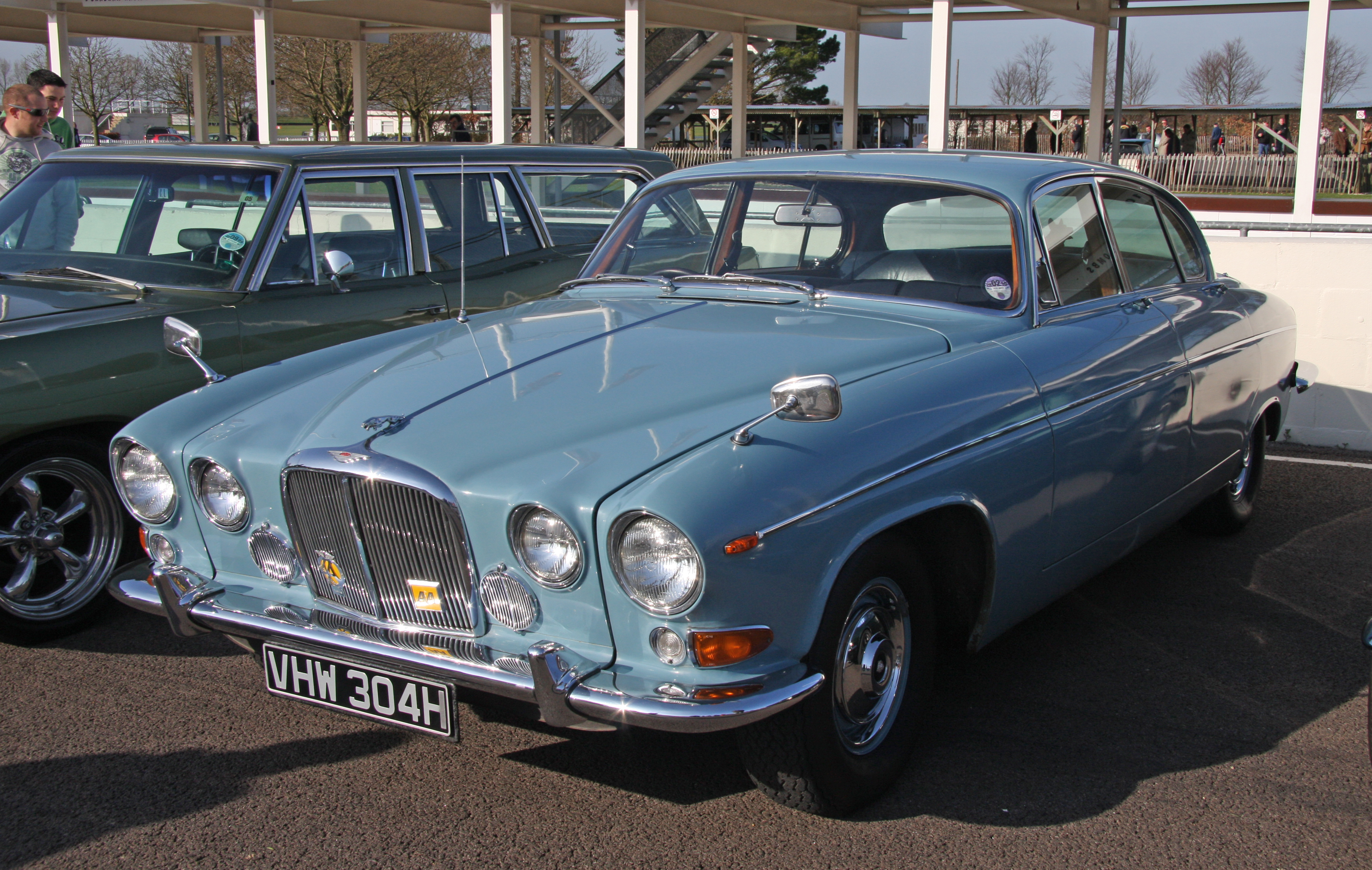
Jaguar 420G

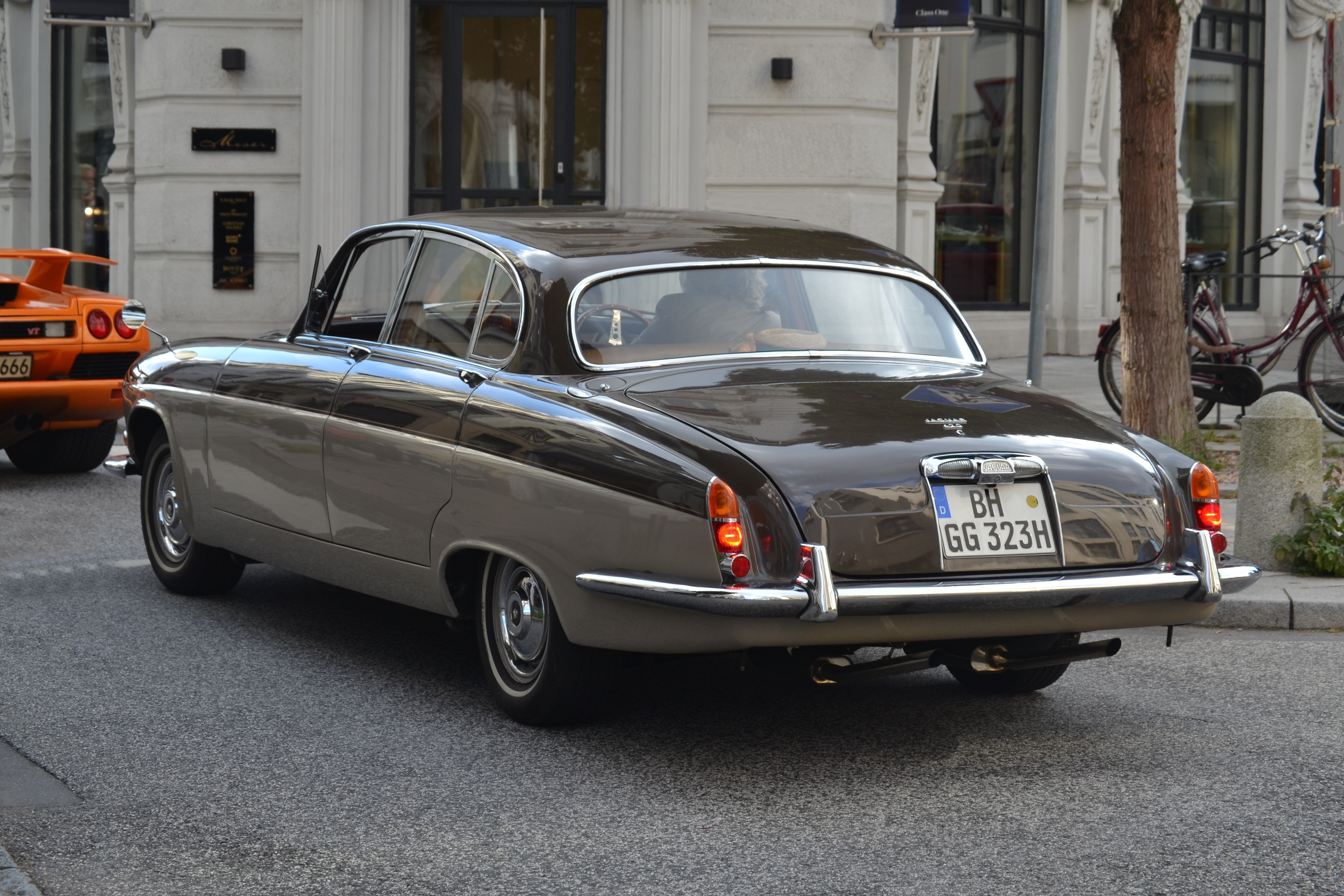
Jaguar 420G

For the London Motor Show in October 1966 the Mark X was renamed the Jaguar 420G (not to be confused with the smaller Jaguar 420). The 420G was distinct from the Mark X only with the addition of a vertical central bar splitting the grille in two, side indicator repeaters on the front wings, and a chrome strip along the wing and door panels (two-tone paint schemes were also available with the chrome strip omitted).

Interior changes included perforations in the central sections of the leather seats, padded dashboard sections for safety, moving the clock to a central position, and the introduction of air conditioning as an option.

A limousine variant was available on the standard wheelbase; a fixed, one-piece seat back topped with a sliding glass partition replaced the separate chairs of standard cars.

Despite running for the same length of time as the Mark X (five years) the 420G sold in less than a third of the numbers. This lack of popularity and the increasing production of the smaller XJ6 resulted in the 420G being run out of production in 1970.

=== Eight seater ===
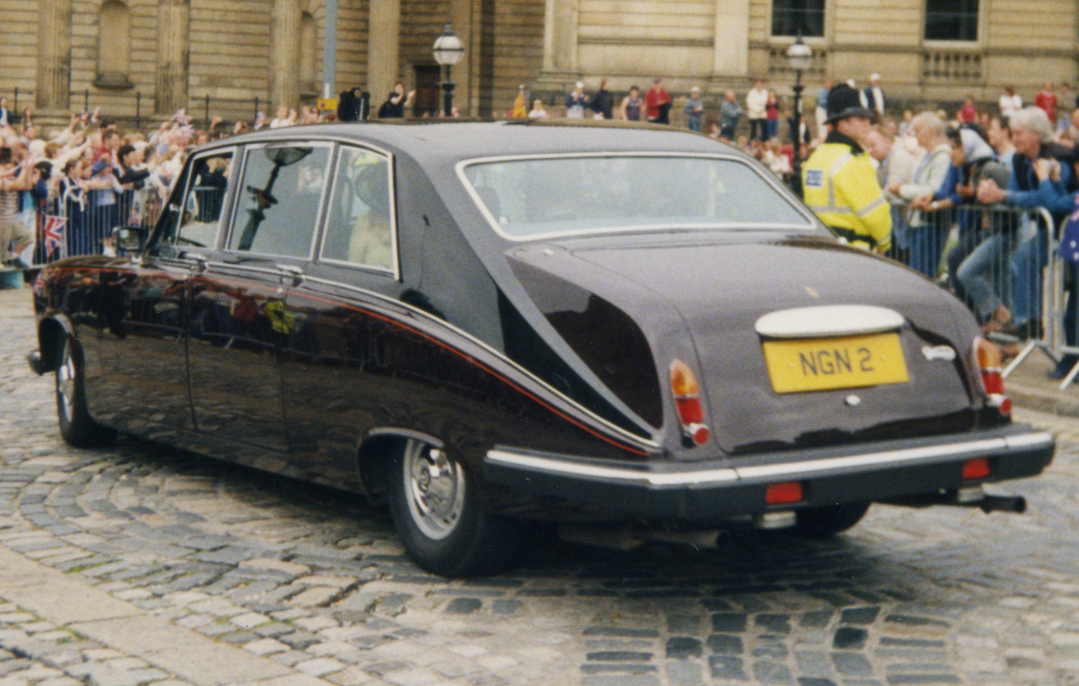
Daimler DS420 on 420G lwb chassis

In 1968, British Leyland ended production of the Daimler limousine DR450 and the Vanden Plas Princess and chose to replace them by offering a 141 in (3,600 mm) extra-long wheelbase 420G with an eight-seater Hooper "Empress Line"-inspired (but still monocoque) body made by Vanden Plas. Aside from the shape of the rear part of the coachwork there was no link with Daimler cars made before Daimler became a subsidiary.

British Leyland's "Daimler DS420" was announced in June 1968. Taller than the 420G the new car was nearly nineteen feet long and six feet six inches wide with "majestic proportions". The rear compartment carried six people in comfort on the rear seats and three fold-away occasional seats. Sir William Lyons pointed out it was less than half the price of its competitors.

The 420G wheelbase was extended by 21", with the mechanical underpinnings of the car being subtly reconfigured. This eight-seater car was built until 1992 and used by many countries in official capacities. It was frequently used by funeral homes for carrying mourners or in modified form as a hearse.

== Scale models ==
A year after the Mark Ten's launch, popular toy carmaker Corgi Toys released their #238 scale model of it, to great popularity. From 1962 to 1967, over 1.1 million were sold, and hardly any other Corgi model was released in as many colours.

== See also ==
- Jaguar 420 — the Jaguar S-Type (available as 3.4 L or 3.8 L) was developed into the 4.2 L Jaguar 420 with its restyled nose in 1966, the same year the 4.2 L Mark X became the 420G.
