= Cooper Mark X =

The Cooper Mk.X, and its evolutions, the Mk.XI, the Mk.XII, and the Mk.XIII, are open-wheel Formula Three race cars, designed, developed, and built by British manufacturer Cooper in 1956 (with production continuing through 1959). It was virtually identical in design to the previous Mk.IX. The internal designation, dubbed the T42, was powered by a 500 cc (31 cu in) JA Prestwich Industries (JAP) single-cylinder engine, and featured a singular brake disk at the rear of the car, flatter springs to mitigate ground clearance, altered and adjusted center spring mountings, and reworked engine mounts. The second version featured an elongated chassis and body, and a larger and more powerful 1,000 cc (61 cu in) OHV V-2 engine. Weight and chassis dimensions were essentially identical to the previous model.
