= Monte Carlo Rally =

Annual rallying event held in Monaco and France

Rallye Automobile Monte-Carlo
- 2011 centenary logo
- Status: Active
- Genre: Motor Sport event
- Date: January
- Frequency: Annual
- Locations: Europe, Africa
- Inaugurated: 1911
- Founder: Prince Albert I
- Website: Official website

The Monte Carlo Rally or Rallye Monte-Carlo (officially Rallye Automobile Monte-Carlo) is a rallying event organized each year by the Automobile Club de Monaco.

From its inception in 1911 by Prince Albert I, the rally was intended to demonstrate improvements and innovations in automobiles, and promote Monaco as a tourist resort on the Mediterranean shore. Before the format changed in 1997, the event was a “concentration rally” in which competitors would set off from various starting points around Europe and drive to Monaco, where the rally would continue to a set of special stages.

The rally now takes place along the hills of the French Riviera and southeast France (Provence-Alpes-Côte d'Azur and the southern parts of Auvergne-Rhône-Alpes). In 2026, for the first time since the 2008 Monte Carlo Rally, the event returned to within the borders of Monaco for a Super Special Stage.

== History ==
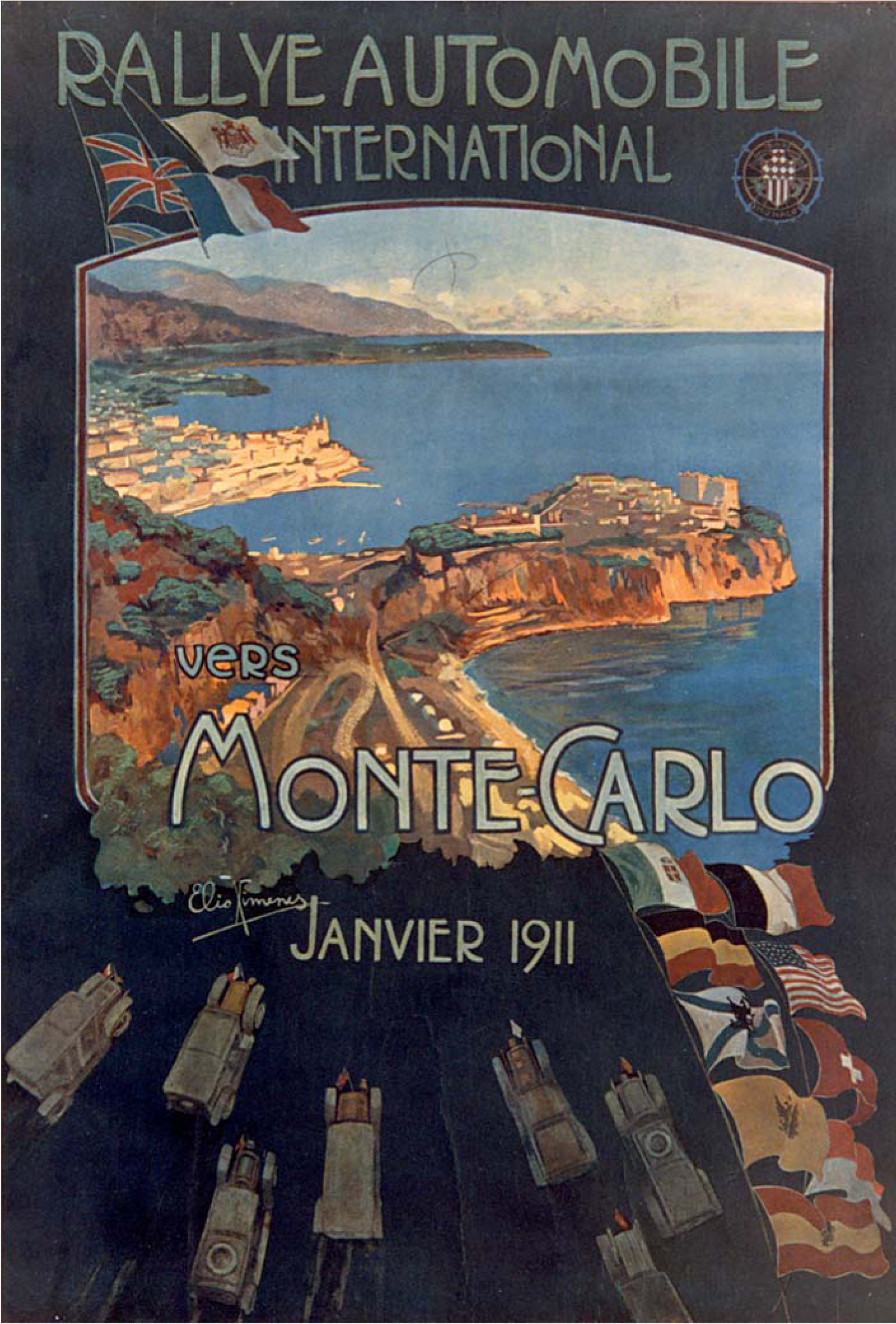
1911 poster for the inaugural Monte Carlo Rally. The lower part of the poster illustrates the rally together of the cars towards Monte Carlo

=== 1911 beginnings ===
In 1909, an association named Sport Automobile et Vélocipédique de Monaco (which became the Automobile Club de Monaco in 1925) started planning a car rally at the behest of Albert I, Prince of Monaco. The Monte Carlo Rally was to start at points all over Europe and converge on Monte Carlo. In January 1911, 23 cars set out from 11 different locations, and Henri Rougier was among the nine who left Paris to cover a 1,020 kilometres (634 mi) route. The event was won by Rougier in a Turcat-Méry 25 Hp. The rally comprised both driving and then somewhat arbitrary judging based on the elegance of the car, passenger comfort and the condition in which it arrived in the principality. The outcry of scandal when the results were published changed nothing, so Rougier was proclaimed the first winner.

Following the Second World War, works or works-supported teams became more and more important. From 1949 onwards, there was a special Team prize. First winners were the three Allards of Potter, Godsall and Imhof. Simca, Delahaye, Sunbeam-Talbot and Jaguar were subsequent winners. Sydney Allard – as the first and only winner driving his own car – was driving a "works" car in 1952, but Gatsonides also participated in a factory prepared Ford Zephyr in 1953, a year that saw no fewer than eight factory backed Sunbeam-Talbots.

=== 1966 controversy ===
The 1966 event was the most controversial in the history of the Rally. The first four finishers, driving three Mini-Coopers, Timo Mäkinen, Rauno Aaltonen and Paddy Hopkirk, and Roger Clark's 4th-placed Ford Cortina were all disqualified because they used non-dipping single filament quartz iodine bulbs in their headlamps, in place of the standard double filament dipping glass bulbs, which are fitted to the series production version of each models sold to the public. This elevated Pauli Toivonen (Citroën ID) into first place overall. Toivonen himself found the situation so embarrassing that he refused to accept his award. Rosemary Smith (Hillman Imp) was also disqualified from sixth place, after winning the Coupe des Dames, the ladies' class. In all, ten cars were disqualified. Teams threatened to boycott the event. The headline in Motor Sport read "The Monte Carlo Fiasco".

=== Recent history ===
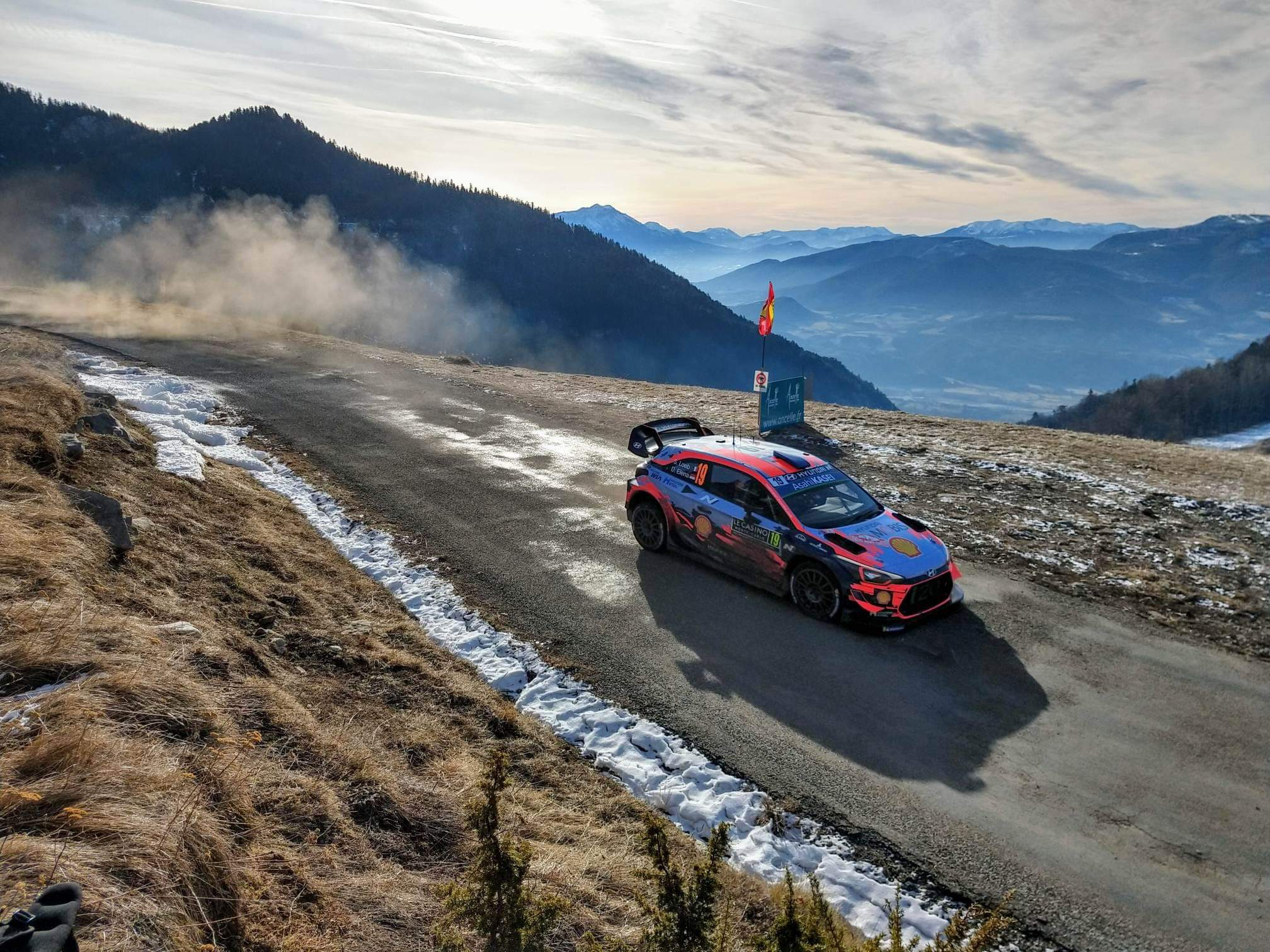
Driver Sébastien Loeb and co-driver Daniel Elena driving the Hyundai i20 Coupe WRC at the 2019 Monte Carlo Rally

From 1973 to 2008, the rally was held in January as the first event of the FIA World Rally Championship. Between 2009 and 2011, it was the opening round of the Intercontinental Rally Challenge (IRC) programme, a championship for N/A 4WD cars, before returning to the WRC championship season again in 2012. As recently as 1991, competitors were able to choose their starting points from approximately five venues roughly equidistant from Monte Carlo (one of Monaco's administrative areas) itself.

With often varying conditions at each starting point (typically comprising dry tarmac, wet tarmac, snow, and ice, sometimes all in a single stage of the rally), this event places a big emphasis on tyre choices, as a driver has to balance the need for grip on ice and snow with the need for grip on dry tarmac. For the driver, this is often a difficult choice as the tyres that work well on snow and ice normally perform poorly on dry tarmac.

The Automobile Club de Monaco confirmed on 19 July 2010 that the 79th Monte Carlo Rally would form the opening round of the new Intercontinental Rally Challenge season. To mark the centenary of the event, the Automobile Club de Monaco also confirmed that Glasgow, Barcelona, Warsaw and Marrakesh were selected as start points for the rally.

== Col de Turini ==
This rally features one of the most famous special stages in the world. The stage is run from La Bollène-Vésubie to Sospel, or the other way around, over a steep and tight mountain road with many hairpin turns. On this 31 km route it passes over the Col de Turini, a mountain pass road which normally has ice and/or snow on sections of it at that time of the year. Spectators also throw snow on the road—in 2005, Marcus Grönholm and Petter Solberg both ripped a wheel off their cars when they skidded on snow probably placed there by spectators, and crashed into a wall. Grönholm went on to finish fifth, but Solberg was forced to retire as the damage to his car was extensive. In the same event, Sébastien Loeb set one of the fastest times in the modern era, with 21 minutes 40 seconds.

Sospel has an elevation of 479 m and the D70 has a maximum elevation of 1603 m, for an average gradient of 6.7%. The Turini is also driven at night, with thousands of fans watching the "Night of Turini", also known as the "Night of the Long Knives" due to the strong high beam lights cutting through the night. In the 2007 edition of the rally, the Turini was not used, but it returned for the 2008 route. For both the 2009 and 2010 event the stage was run at night and shown live on Eurosport.

== The event as part of FIA Championships: ERC, WRC and IRC ==
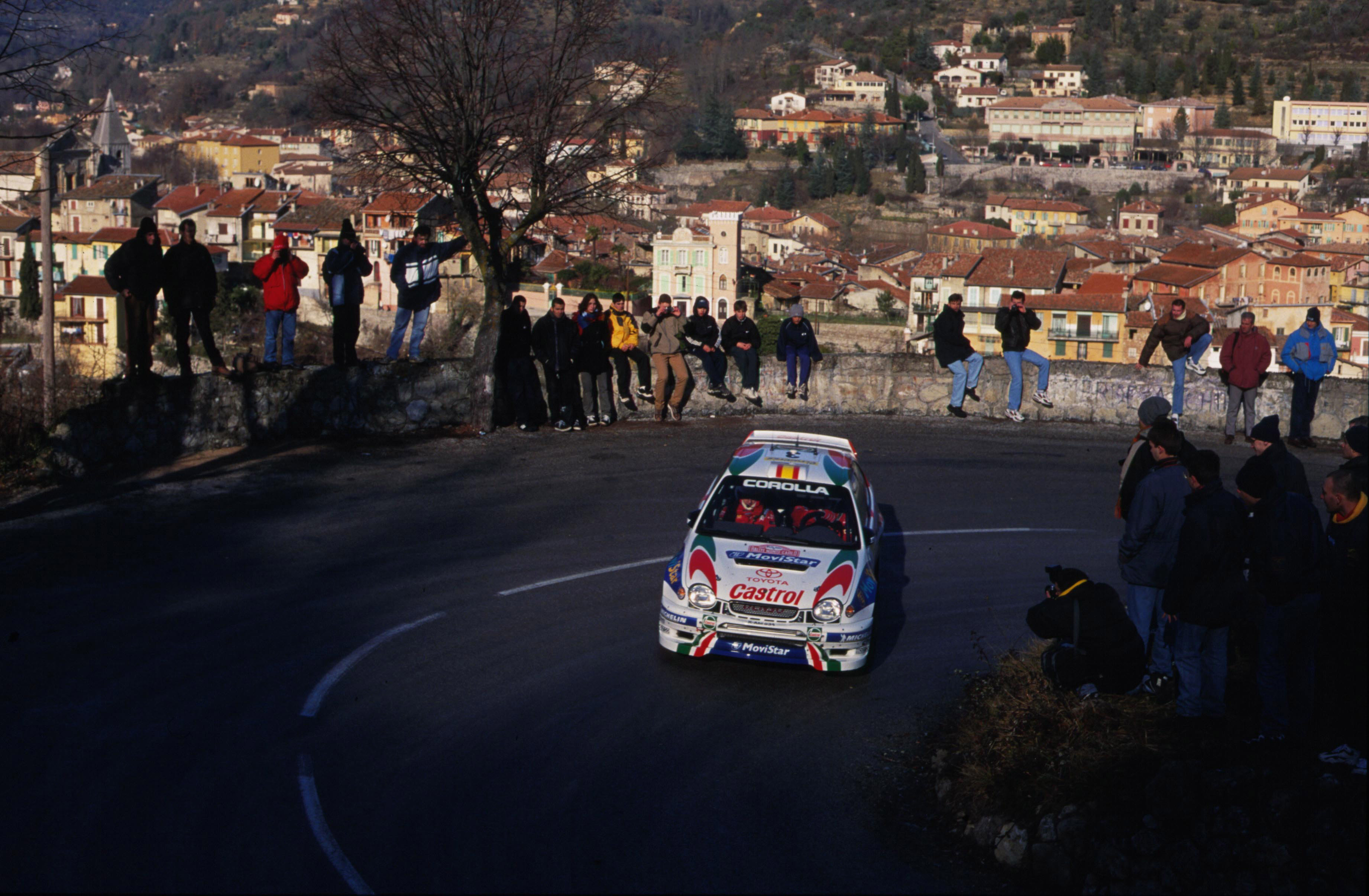
Carlos Sainz driving a Toyota Corolla WRC in 1999.

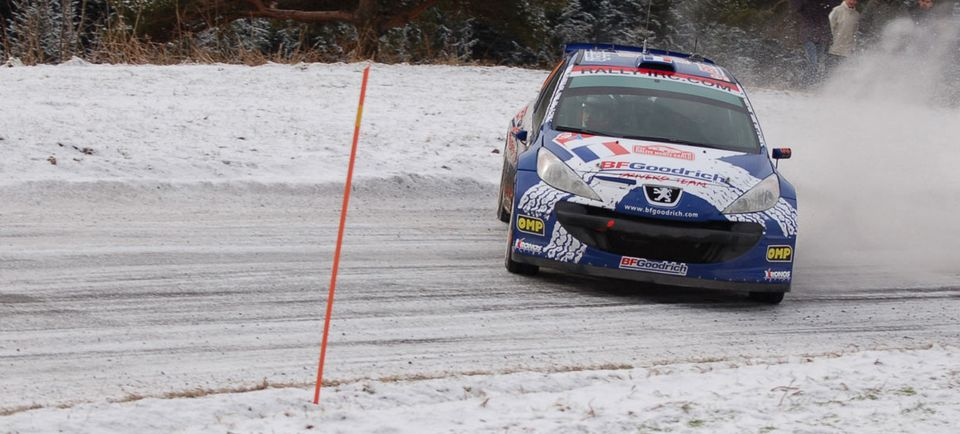
Sébastien Ogier driving a Peugeot 207 S2000 in 2009, when the rally was a part of the Intercontinental Rally Challenge.

From its introduction in 1953 to 1972, the Rallye was part of the European Rally Championship, except in 1968 and 1969. From 1973 to 2008, the rally was held in January as the first event of the FIA World Rally Championship. Between 2009 and 2011, it was the opening round of the Intercontinental Rally Challenge (IRC) programme, a championship for N/A 4WD cars, before returning to the WRC championship season again in 2012. As recently as 1991, competitors were able to choose their starting points from approximately five venues roughly equidistant from Monte Carlo (one of Monaco's administrative areas) itself.

== Past winners of the event, including second and third places ==
=== 1911–1972 ===
Year & Edition	Winner				Second				Third			
Year & Edition	Entrant/Nationality	Car & Type (engine displacement)	Starting #/ License plate	Place of departure (Km)	Entrant/Nationality	Car & Type (engine displacement)	Starting #/ License plate	Place of departure (Km)	Entrant/Nationality	Car & Type (engine displacement)	Starting #/ License plate	Place of departure (Km)
1911 I	Henri Rougier (F)	Turcat-Méry 25HP Double coupé	#1; 793 WI	Paris (1020 km)	J.A. de Aspiazu (6 travellers)	Gobron-Brillié 40CV torpedo cabriolet (7600cc)	#3...6-E	Paris (1020 km)	Julius Beutler (D)	Martini 28/35 HP landaulet	#13?	Berlin (1700 km)
1912 II	Julius Beutler (D)	Berliet 16CV	#69; IA-5135	Berlin (1700 km)	(Captain) Karl Friedrich Von Esmarch (D)	Dürkopp 12/64 HP	#26; IA-6028	Berlin (1700 km)	Paul Meunier (F) (7 travellers)	Delaunay-Belleville 40 CV Conduite Interieure (double rear tyres)	#9	Le Havre (1229 km)
1913–23	Not held											
1924 III	Jacques Edouard Ledure & Madame Ledure (B) (4 travellers)	Bignan 11CV conduite interieure (1975 cc)	#62	Glasgow (2006 km)	M.G. Marquet Fils	Métallurgique 2 litres, conduite interieure Vanden Plas (1970 cc)	#64	Amsterdam (1527 km)	Barbillon	Bignan 11CV conduite interieure (1975 cc)	#77	Boulogne-sur-Mer (1269 km)
1925 IV	François Repusseau & Madame Repusseau (F) (6 travellers)	Renault 40CV Conduite Interieure (9131 cc)	#4	Tunis (3860 km)	Madame Mertens (& Monsieur Mertens) (2 travellers)	Lancia Lambda (2400 cc)	#42; 5829 G8	Tunis (3860 km)	Lt. Lamarche	FN (1460 cc)	#21	Tunis (3860 km)
1926 V	Victor A. Bruce / William J Brunell (GB) (2 travellers)	Autocarrier AC Six twoseater drophead coupé (1991 cc)	#12; PE 7799	John O'Groats (2461 km)	Pierre Bussienne (F)	Sizaire Frères (1993 cc)	#35	Brest, France	Madame "Marika"	Citroën B2/B10 (1452 cc)	#36	Brest, France
1927 VI	Marcel Lefebvre-Despeaux (F) (5 travellers)	Amilcar CGSS Sedan (cozette) (1089 cc)	#29; 9053 X3	Königsberg (2643 km)	Pierre Clause (F)	Celtic-Bignan (1100 cc)	#19	Königsberg (2643 km)	Pierre Bussienne (F)	Sizaire-Frères (1993 cc)	#32	Königsberg (2643 km)
1928 VII	Jacques Bignan (F) (5 travellers)	Fiat 509 Sedan (990 cc)	#24; 2212 X3	Bucharest	E. P. Malaret (5 travellers)	Fiat 509 (990 cc)	#1; 60???	Königsberg	Charlotte Versigny (F)	Talbot 70 sedan (1672 cc)	#2	Bucharest
1929 VIII	Jacques Johan Sprenger van Eijk (NL) / Frits Rodrigo (NL) / Loten van Doelen Grothe (NL) / van Soeren (NL)(4 travellers)	Graham-Paige 619 (4718 cc)	#43; P-4910	Stockholm (2961 km)	Viktor Szmick (HU) / Emánuel Csajkovszky / Laszlo Wolfner ? / Ferenc Pesti ?	Weiss Manfréd prototype (875 cc)	#41; 8 27 193	Bucharest	Ĳsbrand Visser (NL)	Lancia Lambda (2400 cc)	#57	
1930 IX	Hector Petit (F) / Robert Lestienne (F) / André Galloisy (F) (3 travellers)	Licorne 5CV torpedo 2 portes (905 cc)	#27	Iași (3518 km)	(Commandant) Alex C. Berlesco (or: Berlescu) (RO)	DeSoto Model K Roadster six (2799 cc)	#86; UW 3148 (?)	Iași (Jassy) (3518 km)	Abel Blin D'Orimont (B)	Studebaker (5380 cc)	#25	Iași (3518 km)
1931 X	Large cars: Donald Healey (GB) / Lewis Pearce / Humfrey E. Symons (GB) (3 travellers)	Invicta S-type 4.5 Litre (4467 cc)	#128; PL 3188	Stavanger (3638 km)	Jean-Pierre Wimille (F)	Lorraine coupe sport B3-6 (3500 cc)	#121	Stavanger (3638 km)	Madame Lucy Schell (USA)	Bugatti T44 Berline Gangloff (2991 cc)	#167; 2059 RE4	Stavanger (3638 km)
1931 X	Small cars (<1100cc) Victor E. Leverett (GB)	Riley Nine Monaco Saloon (1087 cc)	#4; GN7	Stavanger (3638 km)	de Lavalette	Peugeot			Madame Jeanne	Rosengart		
1932 XI	Large cars: Maurice Vasselle (F) / François Duhamel (F)	Hotchkiss AM 2 (2475 cc)	#64 9558 RF4	Umeå (3750 km)	Donald Healey (GB)	Invicta S-type 4.5 litre low chassis (4467 cc)	#1; PL 9662	Umeå (3750 km)	Boris Ivanowski (RU)/ Mary Ham	Ford V8 (3284 cc)	#62	Umeå (3750 km)
1932 XI	Small cars (<1500 cc): G. de Lavelette (F)/Charles de Cortanze (F)	Peugeot 201C (1085 cc)	#212; 3084 RF4	Umeå (3750 km)	André Boillot (F)	Peugeot 201C (1085 cc)	#211; 3085 RF4	Athens (3785 km)	Victor E. Leverett (GB) / George Dennison (GB)	Riley Six Alpine Tourer (1486 cc)	#208; VC 9899	Umeå (3750 km)
1933 XII	Maurice Vasselle (F) / Buzi (F) / Maret (F)	Hotchkiss AM80 S (3485 cc)	#1; 8291-RG1	Tallinn (3780 km)	Robert Guyot (F)	Renault Nervasport (4241 cc)	#34; 4259 RC	Tallinn (3780 km)	Germaine Rouault (F) / Julio Quinlin (F)	Salmson S4C (1495 cc)	#15; 5856 RG	Tallinn (3780 km)
1934 XIII	Louis Gas (F) / Jean Trévoux (F)	Hotchkiss AM80 S (3485 cc)	#4; 9683 RT	Athens (3786 km)	Marc Chauvierre-Lanciano (F) (4 travellers)	Chenard-Walcker Aigle V8 (3600 cc)	#17; 5630 R??	Athens (3786 km)	Donald Healey (GB) / Lewis Pearce (GB) (3 travellers ?)	Triumph Gloria "special" (1232 cc)	#151; KV 6905	Athens (3786 km)
1935 XIV	Charles Lahaye (F) / René Quatresous (F)	Renault Nervasport CS (4827 cc?)	#51; 8000 UD 2	Stavanger (3696 km)	Jack C. Ridley (GB)	Triumph Gloria "special" (1232 cc)	#23; KVG 90?	Umeå (3780 km)	Madame Lucy O'Reilly Schell (USA) / Laury Schell(USA)	Delahaye 135 (3557 cc)	#136; 1821-RJI	Stavanger (3696 km)
1936 XV	Petre G. Cristea (RO)/ Ion Zamfirescu (RO)	Ford Model 48 two-seater convertible "speciale" (3622 cc)	#16; 1701-B	Athens	Lucy O'Reilly Schell (USA)| Laury Schell (USA)	Delahaye 135 Sport (3557 cc)	#41; 707 RK	Athens	Charles Lahaye (F) / [René Quatresous] (F)	Renault Vivasport (4085 cc)	#1; 1330 DU 3	Athens
1937 XVI	René Le Bègue (F) / Julio Quinlin (F)	Delahaye 135 MS Spéciale (3557 cc)	#20; 1581 RK 2	Stavanger	Philippe de Massa (F) / Norbert-Jean Mahe (F)	Talbot (3988 cc)	#86	Stavanger	M. Jacobs / Tj. de Boer (NL) / Lindner	Buick (4560 cc)	#103	Stavanger
1938 XVII	Gerard Bakker-Schut (NL) / Karel Ton (NL) / Klaas Barendrecht (NL)	Ford V8 two-door coupe (3622 cc)	#9; GZ 15572	Athens	Jean Trévoux (F) / Marcel Lesurque (F)	Hotchkiss 686 (3485 cc)	#12; 3354 RL 4	Athens	Charles Lahaye (F) / René Quatresous (F)	Renault Primaquatre (2383 cc)	#93; 8000 DU 3	Athens
1939 XVIII	Jean Trévoux (F) / Marcel Lesurque (F), ex aequo Jean Paul (F) / Marcel Contet (F)	Hotchkiss 686 GS Riviera cabriolet (3485 cc), ex aequo Delahaye 135 M (3557 cc)	#7, ex aequo #31	Athens, ex aequo Athens (3812 km)	No second place, joint first place				Ernest Mutsaerts (NL)/ André Kouwenberg (NL)/ Paul Lamberts Hurrelbrinck (NL)	Ford V8 (3622 cc)	#71	Palermo (4090 km)
1940–48	Not held											
1949 XIX	Jean Trévoux (F) / Marcel Lesurque (F)	Hotchkiss 686GS sedan (3485 cc)	#36; 5940 RO 6	Lisbon	Maurice Worms / Edmond Mouche	Hotchkiss 686 GS sedan (3485 cc)	#38	Monte Carlo	František Dobry (CZ) / Zdeněk Treybal (CZ)	Bristol 400 (1971 cc)	#68; P 28797	Monte Carlo
1950 XX	Marcel Becquart (F) / Henri Secret (F)	Hotchkiss 686GS sedan Paris-Nice (1939) (3485 cc)	#23; 10 04	Lisbon	Maurice Gatsonides (NL) / Klaas Barendregt (NL)	Humber Super Snipe (4086 cc)	#231; JHP 329	Monte Carlo	Julio Quinlin (F) /Jean Behra (F)	Simca 8 Coupé (1090 cc)	#224; 821 RU8	Monte Carlo
1951 XXI	Jean Trévoux (F) / Roger Crovetto (F)	Delahaye 175 S Motto (4455 cc)	#277; 3413 P 75	Lisbon	Comte/Conde? de Monte Real (P) / Manuel J. Palma (P)	Ford V8 (3622 cc?)	#332; HC-13-03	Lisbon	Cecil Vard (IRL)/ Bill A Young / Arthur Jolley (GB NI)	Jaguar Mark V (3485 cc?)	#211; ZE 7445	Glasgow
1952 XXII	Sydney Allard (GB) / Guy Warburton (GB)/ Tom Lush (navigator) (GB)	Allard P1 (3622 cc Ford V8)	#146; MLX 381	Glasgow	Stirling Moss (GB)/ Desmond Scannell (GB)/ John Cooper (GB)	Sunbeam-Talbot 90 (2267 cc)	#341; LHP 823		Dr. Marc Angelvin (F) / Nicole Angelvin (F)	Simca 8 Sport (1221 cc)	#293; 5052 AE 13	
1953 XXIII	Maurice Gatsonides (NL) / Peter Worledge (GB)	Ford Zephyr (2262 cc)	#365; VHK 194	Monte Carlo	Ian Appleyard (GB)/ Pat Appleyard (GB)	Jaguar Mark VII (3442 cc)	#228; PNW 7		Roger Marion / Jean Charmasson	Citroën 15 CV Six (2867 cc)		
1954 XXIV	Louis Chiron (MON) / Ciro Basadonna (I)	Lancia Aurelia B20 GT (2451 cc)	#69; 142843 TO	Monte Carlo	Pierre David / Paul Barbier (F)	Peugeot 203 (1290 cc)	#393		André Blanchard / Marcel Lecoq (F)	Panhard Dyna X86 cabriolet (850 cc)	#394	
1955 XXV	Per Malling (N) / Gunnar Fadum (N)	Sunbeam-Talbot 90 Mk III (2267 cc)	#201; A-68909	Oslo	Georges Gillard / Roger Duget	Panhard Dyna Z (848 cc)	#275; 369 BX 63	Monte Carlo	Hanns Gerdum (D)/ Joachim Kühling (D)	Mercedes-Benz 220 (2195 cc)	#255; H94-8070	Munich
1956 XXVI	Ronnie Adams / Frank Biggar (EI)/ Derek Johnston (GB/Northern Ireland)	Jaguar Mark VII (3442 cc)	#164; PWK 700	Glasgow	Walter Schock (D)/ K Raebe (D)	Mercedes-Benz 220 (2195 cc)			Michel Grosgogeat / Pierre Biagini	DKW	#331; 845 DJ 06	
1957	Cancelled (Fuel coupons not issued for rallying)											
1958 XXVII	Guy Monraisse (F) / Jacques Feret (F)	Renault Dauphine Gordini R1091 (845 cc)	#65; 9641 GN 75	Lisbon	Alexandre Gacon (F)/ Leo Borsa (F)	Alfa Romeo Giulietta (1290 cc)	#70; 9646 AV 69		Leif Vold-Johansen (N) / Finn Huseby Kopperud (N)	DKW (896 cc)	#18; A 8052	
1959 XXVIII	Paul Coltelloni (F)/ Pierre Alexandre (F)/ Claude Desrosiers (F)	Citroën ID19 (1911 cc)	#176; 3427 HP 75	Paris	André Thomas / Jean Delliere	Simca Aronde (1290 cc)	#211; 28 DH 26		Pierre Surles / Jacques Piniers	Panhard 850 (848 cc)		
1960 XXIX	Walter Schock (D) / Rolf Moll (D)	Mercedes-Benz 220SE (2195 cc)	#128; S-JX 190	Warsaw	Eugen Böhringer (D)/ Hermann Socher (D)	Mercedes-Benz 220SE (2195 cc)	#121; S-JX 74		Eberhard Mahle (D)/ Roland Ott (D)	Mercedes-Benz 220SE (2195 cc)	#135; S-JX 71	
1961 XXX	Maurice Martin (F) / Roger Bateau (F)	Panhard PL 17 Tigre (848 cc)	#174; 9333 KJ 75		Walter Löffler (D)/ Hans-Joachim Walter (D)	Panhard PL 17 Tigre (848 cc)	#87; 8758 TB 75		Guy Jouanneaux / Alain Coquillet	Panhard PL 17 Tigre (848 cc)	#220; 957 FC 45	
1962 XXXI	Erik Carlsson (S)/ Gunnar Häggbom (S)	Saab 96 (841 cc)	#303; P 61444	Oslo	Eugen Böhringer (D) / Peter Lang (D)	Mercedes-Benz 220SE (2195 cc)	#257; S-JX 74		Paddy Hopkirk (GB NI)/ Jack Scott (GB)	Sunbeam Rapier (1592 cc)	#155; 5192 RW	
1963 XXXII	Erik Carlsson (S)/ Gunnar Palm (S)	Saab 96 (841 cc)	#283; P 77558	Stockholm	Pauli Toivonen (FIN) / Anssi Järvi (FIN)	Citroën DS19 (1911 cc)	#233; 7230 NC 75		Rauno Aaltonen (FIN) / Tony Ambrose (GB)	Mini Cooper (997 cc)	#288; 977 ARX	
1964 XXXIII	Paddy Hopkirk (GB NI) / Henry Liddon (GB)	Morris Mini Cooper S (1071 cc)	#37; 33 EJB	Minsk	Bo Ljungfeldt (S)/ Fergus Sager (S)	Ford Falcon Futura Sprint (4700 cc)	#49; ZE-1047		Erik Carlsson (S) / Gunnar Palm (S)	Saab 96 Sport (841 cc)	#131; P 44301	
1965 XXXIV	Timo Mäkinen (FIN) / Paul Easter (GB)	Mini Cooper S (1071cc)	#52; AJB44B	Stockholm	Eugen Böhringer (D) / Rolf Wütherich (D)	Porsche 904 (1966 cc)	#10; S-TJ 16		Pat Moss-Carlsson (GB) / Elisabeth Nyström (S)	Saab 96 Sport (841 cc)	#49; PA 12570	
1966 XXXV	Pauli Toivonen (FIN) / Ensio Mikander (FIN)	Citroën DS21 (2175 cc)	#195; 8625 SC 75	Oslo	René Trautmann (F)/ Jean-Pierre Hanrioud (F)	Lancia Flavia coupé (1800 cc)	#66; TO 759709		Ove Andersson (S) / Rolf Dahlgren (S)	Lancia Flavia coupé (1800 cc)	#140; TO 756708	
1967 XXXVI	Rauno Aaltonen (FIN) / Henry Liddon (GB)	Mini Cooper S	#177; LBL 6D	Monte Carlo	Ove Andersson (S) / John Davenport (GB)	Lancia Fulvia 1200 HF (1200cc)			Vic Elford (GB) / David Stone (GB)	Porsche 911S (1991 cc)		
1968 XXXVII	Vic Elford (GB)/ David Stone (GB)	Porsche 911T (1991 cc)	#210; S-C9166	Warsaw	Pauli Toivonen (FIN) / Martti Tiukkanen (FIN)	Porsche 911S (1991 cc)	#116; 4028 Z-97		Rauno Aaltonen (FIN) / Henry Liddon (GB)	Mini Cooper 1275S (1275 cc)	#18; ORX 7F	
1969 XXXVIII	Björn Waldegård / Lars Helmer (S)	Porsche 911S (1991 cc)	#37; S-L 2263	Warsaw	Gérard Larrousse (F) / Jean-Claude Perramond (F)	Porsche 911S (1991 cc)	#31; S-L 2264		Jean Vinatier / Jean-François Jacob	Alpine-Renault A110 1300S (1300cc)	#26; 7753 GH 76	
1970 XXXIX	Björn Waldegård (S) / Lars Helmér (S)	Porsche 911S (2195 cc)	#6; S-T 5704	Oslo	Gérard Larrousse (F) / Maurice Gélin (F)	Porsche 911S (2195 cc)	#2; S-T 5705		Jean-Pierre Nicolas (F) / Claude Roure (F)	Alpine-Renault A110 1300S (1300 cc)	#18; 3413 GP 76	
1971 XL	Ove Andersson (S) / David Stone (GB)	Alpine-Renault A110 1600S (1585 cc)	#28; 8380 GU 76	Marrakesh	Jean-Luc Thérier (F) / Marcel Callewaert (F)	Alpine-Renault A110 1600S (1600 cc)	#9; 8385 GU 76	Marrakesh	Björn Waldegård (S) / Hans Thorszelius (S), ex aequo Jean-Claude Andruet (F)/ G. Vial (F)	Porsche 914/6 (1991 cc), ex aequo Alpine-Renault A110 1600S (1600 cc)	#7; S-Y 7714, ex aequo....	Warsaw, ex aequo....
1972 XLI	Sandro Munari (I) / Mario Manucci (I)	Lancia Fulvia 1.6HF (1584 cc)	#14; E 24265 TO	Almeria	Gérard Larrousse (F) / Jean-Claude Perramond (F)	Porsche 911S (2341 cc)			Rauno Aaltonen (FIN) / Jean Todt (F)	Datsun 240Z (2393 cc)		

=== 1973–1985 ===
Rally name	Special Stages	Podium finishers			
Rally name	Special Stages	Rank	Driver Co-driver	Team Car	Time
42ème Rallye Automobile de Monte-Carlo; 19 to 26 January 1973; Round 1 of the World Rally Championship	18 stages 420 km	1	(France) Jean-Claude Andruet (France) "Biche"	(France) Alpine-Renault A110 1800	5h 42m 04s
42ème Rallye Automobile de Monte-Carlo; 19 to 26 January 1973; Round 1 of the World Rally Championship	18 stages 420 km	2	(Sweden) Ove Andersson (France) Jean Todt	(France) Alpine-Renault A110 1800	5h 42m 30s
42ème Rallye Automobile de Monte-Carlo; 19 to 26 January 1973; Round 1 of the World Rally Championship	18 stages 420 km	3	(France) Jean-Pierre Nicolas (France) Michel Vial	(France) Alpine-Renault A110 1800	5h 43m 39s
1974 rally cancelled
43ème Rallye Automobile de Monte-Carlo; 15 to 23 January 1975; Round 1 of the World Rally Championship	22 stages 472 km	1	(Italy) Sandro Munari (Italy) Mario Manucci	(Italy) Lancia Stratos HF	6h 25m 59s
43ème Rallye Automobile de Monte-Carlo; 15 to 23 January 1975; Round 1 of the World Rally Championship	22 stages 472 km	2	(Finland) Hannu Mikkola (France) Jean Todt	(Italy) Fiat Abarth 124 Rallye	6h 29m 05s
43ème Rallye Automobile de Monte-Carlo; 15 to 23 January 1975; Round 1 of the World Rally Championship	22 stages 472 km	3	(Finland) Markku Alén (Finland) Ilkka Kivimäki	(Italy) Fiat Abarth 124 Rallye	6h 29m 46s
44ème Rallye Automobile de Monte-Carlo; 17 to 24 January 1976; Round 1 of the World Rally Championship	23 stages 530 km	1	(Italy) Sandro Munari (Italy) Silvio Maiga	(Italy) Lancia Stratos HF	6h 25m 10s
44ème Rallye Automobile de Monte-Carlo; 17 to 24 January 1976; Round 1 of the World Rally Championship	23 stages 530 km	2	(Sweden) Björn Waldegård (Sweden) Hans Thorszelius	(Italy) Lancia Stratos HF	6h 26m 37s
44ème Rallye Automobile de Monte-Carlo; 17 to 24 January 1976; Round 1 of the World Rally Championship	23 stages 530 km	3	(France) Bernard Darniche (France) Alain Mahé	(Italy) Lancia Stratos HF	6h 31m 23s
45ème Rallye Automobile de Monte-Carlo; 22 to 28 January 1977; Round 1 of the World Rally Championship; Round 1 of the FIA Cup for Rally Drivers	26 stages 506 km	1	(Italy) Sandro Munari (Italy) Silvio Maiga	(Italy) Lancia Stratos HF	6h 36m 13s
45ème Rallye Automobile de Monte-Carlo; 22 to 28 January 1977; Round 1 of the World Rally Championship; Round 1 of the FIA Cup for Rally Drivers	26 stages 506 km	2	(France) Jean-Claude Andruet (France) "Biche"	(Italy) Fiat 131 Abarth	6h 38m 29s
45ème Rallye Automobile de Monte-Carlo; 22 to 28 January 1977; Round 1 of the World Rally Championship; Round 1 of the FIA Cup for Rally Drivers	26 stages 506 km	3	(Spain) Antonio Zanini (Spain) Juan Petisco	(Spain) SEAT 124 – 1800	6h 47m 07s
46ème Rallye Automobile de Monte-Carlo; 21 to 28 January 1978; Round 1 of the World Rally Championship; Round 1 of the FIA Cup for Rally Drivers	29 stages 570 km	1	(France) Jean-Pierre Nicolas (France) Vincent Laverne	(Germany) Porsche 911 Carrera	6h 57m 03s
46ème Rallye Automobile de Monte-Carlo; 21 to 28 January 1978; Round 1 of the World Rally Championship; Round 1 of the FIA Cup for Rally Drivers	29 stages 570 km	2	(France) Jean Ragnotti (France) Jean-Marc Andrié	(France) Renault 5 Alpine	6h 58m 55s
46ème Rallye Automobile de Monte-Carlo; 21 to 28 January 1978; Round 1 of the World Rally Championship; Round 1 of the FIA Cup for Rally Drivers	29 stages 570 km	3	(France) Guy Fréquelin (France) Jacques Delaval	(France) Renault 5 Alpine	6h 59m 55s
47ème Rallye Automobile de Monte-Carlo; 20 to 26 January 1979; Round 1 of the World Rally Championship	30 stages 619 km	1	(France) Bernard Darniche (France) Alain Mahé	(France) Team Chardonnet (Italy) Lancia Stratos HF	8h 13m 38s
47ème Rallye Automobile de Monte-Carlo; 20 to 26 January 1979; Round 1 of the World Rally Championship	30 stages 619 km	2	(Sweden) Björn Waldegård (Sweden) Hans Thorszelius	(United States) Ford Motor Company (United States) Ford Escort RS1800	8h 13m 44s
47ème Rallye Automobile de Monte-Carlo; 20 to 26 January 1979; Round 1 of the World Rally Championship	30 stages 619 km	3	(Finland) Markku Alén (Finland) Ilkka Kivimäki	(Italy) Alitalia Fiat (Italy) Fiat 131 Abarth	8h 17m 47s
48ème Rallye Automobile de Monte-Carlo; 19 to 25 January 1980; Round 1 of the World Rally Championship	30 stages 601 km	1	(West Germany) Walter Röhrl (West Germany) Christian Geistdörfer	(Italy) Fiat Italia (Italy) Fiat 131 Abarth	8h 42m 20s
48ème Rallye Automobile de Monte-Carlo; 19 to 25 January 1980; Round 1 of the World Rally Championship	30 stages 601 km	2	(France) Bernard Darniche (France) Alain Mahé	(France) Team Chardonnet (Italy) Lancia Stratos HF	8h 52m 58s
48ème Rallye Automobile de Monte-Carlo; 19 to 25 January 1980; Round 1 of the World Rally Championship	30 stages 601 km	3	(Sweden) Björn Waldegård (Sweden) Hans Thorszelius	(Italy) Fiat Italia (Italy) Fiat 131 Abarth	8h 53m 48s
49ème Rallye Automobile de Monte-Carlo; 24 to 30 January 1981; Round 1 of the World Rally Championship	32 stages 757 km	1	(France) Jean Ragnotti (France) Jean-Marc Andrié	(France) Renault Elf (France) Renault 5 Turbo	9h 55m 55s
49ème Rallye Automobile de Monte-Carlo; 24 to 30 January 1981; Round 1 of the World Rally Championship	32 stages 757 km	2	(France) Guy Fréquelin (France) Jean Todt	(United Kingdom) Talbot (United Kingdom) Talbot Sunbeam Lotus	9h 58m 49s
49ème Rallye Automobile de Monte-Carlo; 24 to 30 January 1981; Round 1 of the World Rally Championship	32 stages 757 km	3	(West Germany) Jochi Kleint (West Germany) Gunter Wanger	(Germany) Opel Euro Händler (Germany) Opel Ascona 400	10h 2m 54s
50ème Rallye Automobile de Monte-Carlo; 16 to 22 January 1982; Round 1 of the World Rally Championship	32 stages 753 km	1	(West Germany) Walter Röhrl (West Germany) Christian Geistdörfer	(United Kingdom) Rothmans Opel Rally Team (Germany) Opel Ascona 400	8h 20m 33s
50ème Rallye Automobile de Monte-Carlo; 16 to 22 January 1982; Round 1 of the World Rally Championship	32 stages 753 km	2	(Finland) Hannu Mikkola (Sweden) Arne Hertz	(Germany) Audi Sport (Germany) Audi Quattro	8h 24m 22s
50ème Rallye Automobile de Monte-Carlo; 16 to 22 January 1982; Round 1 of the World Rally Championship	32 stages 753 km	3	(France) Jean-Luc Thérier (France) Michel Vial	(France) Esso (Germany) Porsche 911SC	8h 32m 38s
51ème Rallye Automobile de Monte-Carlo; 22 to 29 January 1983; Round 1 of the World Rally Championship	30 stages 709 km	1	(West Germany) Walter Röhrl (West Germany) Christian Geistdörfer	(Italy) Martini Racing (Italy) Lancia Rally 037	7h 58m 57s
51ème Rallye Automobile de Monte-Carlo; 22 to 29 January 1983; Round 1 of the World Rally Championship	30 stages 709 km	2	(Finland) Markku Alén (Finland) Ilkka Kivimäki	(Italy) Martini Racing (Italy) Lancia Rally 037	8h 5m 59s
51ème Rallye Automobile de Monte-Carlo; 22 to 29 January 1983; Round 1 of the World Rally Championship	30 stages 709 km	3	(Sweden) Stig Blomqvist (Sweden) Björn Cederberg	(Germany) Audi Sport (Germany) Audi Quattro A1	8h 10m 15s
52ème Rallye Automobile de Monte-Carlo; 21 to 27 January 1984; Round 1 of the World Rally Championship	30 stages 722 km	1	(West Germany) Walter Röhrl (West Germany) Christian Geistdörfer	(Germany) Audi Sport (Germany) Audi Quattro A2	8h 52m 29s
52ème Rallye Automobile de Monte-Carlo; 21 to 27 January 1984; Round 1 of the World Rally Championship	30 stages 722 km	2	(Sweden) Stig Blomqvist (Sweden) Björn Cederberg	(Germany) Audi Sport (Germany) Audi Quattro A2	8h 53m 53s
52ème Rallye Automobile de Monte-Carlo; 21 to 27 January 1984; Round 1 of the World Rally Championship	30 stages 722 km	3	(Finland) Hannu Mikkola (Sweden) Arne Hertz	(Germany) Audi Sport (Germany) Audi Quattro A2	9h 5m 9s
53ème Rallye Automobile de Monte-Carlo; 26 January to 1 February 1985; Round 1 of the World Rally Championship	34 stages 852 km	1	(Finland) Ari Vatanen (United Kingdom) Terry Harryman	(France) Peugeot Talbot Sport (France) Peugeot 205 Turbo 16	10h 20m 49s
53ème Rallye Automobile de Monte-Carlo; 26 January to 1 February 1985; Round 1 of the World Rally Championship	34 stages 852 km	2	(West Germany) Walter Röhrl (West Germany) Christian Geistdörfer	(Germany) Audi Sport (Germany) Audi Sport Quattro	10h 26m 06s
53ème Rallye Automobile de Monte-Carlo; 26 January to 1 February 1985; Round 1 of the World Rally Championship	34 stages 852 km	3	(Finland) Timo Salonen (Finland) Seppo Harjanne	(France) Peugeot Talbot Sport (France) Peugeot 205 Turbo 16	10h 30m 54s

=== 1986–1999 ===
Rally name	Stages	Podium finishers			
Rally name	Stages	Rank	Driver Co-driver	Team Car	Time
54ème Rallye Automobile de Monte-Carlo; 18 to 24 January 1986; Round 1 of the World Rally Championship	36 stages 867 km	1	(Finland) Henri Toivonen (United States) Sergio Cresto	(Italy) Martini Lancia (Italy) Lancia Delta S4(Group B)	10h 11m 24s
54ème Rallye Automobile de Monte-Carlo; 18 to 24 January 1986; Round 1 of the World Rally Championship	36 stages 867 km	2	(Finland) Timo Salonen (Finland) Seppo Harjanne	(France) Peugeot Talbot Sport (France) Peugeot 205 Turbo 16 E2	10h 15m 28s
54ème Rallye Automobile de Monte-Carlo; 18 to 24 January 1986; Round 1 of the World Rally Championship	36 stages 867 km	3	(Finland) Hannu Mikkola (Sweden) Arne Hertz	(Germany) Audi Sport (Germany) Audi Sport Quattro E2	10h 18m 46s
55ème Rallye Automobile de Monte-Carlo; 17 to 22 January 1987; Round 1 of the World Rally Championship	26 stages 572 km	1	(Italy) Miki Biasion (Italy) Tiziano Siviero	(Italy) Martini Lancia (Italy) Lancia Delta HF 4WD (Group A)	7h 39m 50s
55ème Rallye Automobile de Monte-Carlo; 17 to 22 January 1987; Round 1 of the World Rally Championship	26 stages 572 km	2	(Finland) Juha Kankkunen (Finland) Juha Piironen	(Italy) Martini Lancia (Italy) Lancia Delta HF 4WD	7h 40m 49s
55ème Rallye Automobile de Monte-Carlo; 17 to 22 January 1987; Round 1 of the World Rally Championship	26 stages 572 km	3	(West Germany) Walter Röhrl (West Germany) Christian Geistdörfer	(Germany) Audi Sport (Germany) Audi 200 Quattro	7h 44m 0s
56ème Rallye Automobile de Monte-Carlo; 16 to 21 January 1988; Round 1 of the World Rally Championship	26 stages 624 km	1	(France) Bruno Saby (France) Jean-François Fauchille	(Italy) Martini Lancia (Italy) Lancia Delta HF 4WD	7h 19m 11s
56ème Rallye Automobile de Monte-Carlo; 16 to 21 January 1988; Round 1 of the World Rally Championship	26 stages 624 km	2	(Italy) Alex Fiorio (Italy) Luigi Pirollo	(Italy) Jolly Club (Italy) Lancia Delta HF 4WD	7h 30m 1s
56ème Rallye Automobile de Monte-Carlo; 16 to 21 January 1988; Round 1 of the World Rally Championship	26 stages 624 km	3	(France) Jean-Pierre Ballet (France) Marie-Christine Lallemont	(France) Privateer (France) Peugeot 205 GTI	7h 42m 46s
57ème Rallye Automobile de Monte-Carlo; 21 to 26 January 1989; Round 2 of the World Rally Championship	24 stages 613 km	1	(Italy) Miki Biasion (Italy) Tiziano Siviero	(Italy) Martini Lancia (Italy) Lancia Delta Integrale	7h 13m 27s
57ème Rallye Automobile de Monte-Carlo; 21 to 26 January 1989; Round 2 of the World Rally Championship	24 stages 613 km	2	(France) Didier Auriol (France) Bernard Occelli	(Italy) Martini Lancia (Italy) Lancia Delta Integrale	7h 19m 54s
57ème Rallye Automobile de Monte-Carlo; 21 to 26 January 1989; Round 2 of the World Rally Championship	24 stages 613 km	3	(France) Bruno Saby (France) Jean-François Fauchille	(Italy) Martini Lancia (Italy) Lancia Delta Integrale	7h 21m 8s
58ème Rallye Automobile de Monte-Carlo; 19 to 25 January 1990; Round 1 of the World Rally Championship	20 stages 556 km	1	(France) Didier Auriol (France) Bernard Occelli	(Italy) Martini Lancia (Italy) Lancia Delta Integrale 16V	5h 56m 52s
58ème Rallye Automobile de Monte-Carlo; 19 to 25 January 1990; Round 1 of the World Rally Championship	20 stages 556 km	2	(Spain) Carlos Sainz (Spain) Luis Moya	(Germany) Toyota Team Europe (Japan) Toyota Celica GT-Four ST165	5h 57m 44s
58ème Rallye Automobile de Monte-Carlo; 19 to 25 January 1990; Round 1 of the World Rally Championship	20 stages 556 km	3	(Italy) Miki Biasion (Italy) Tiziano Siviero	(Italy) Martini Lancia (Italy) Lancia Delta Integrale 16V	6h 0m 31s
59ème Rallye Automobile de Monte-Carlo; 24 to 30 January 1991; Round 1 of the World Rally Championship	27 stages 626 km	1	(Spain) Carlos Sainz (Spain) Luis Moya	(Germany) Toyota Team Europe (Japan) Toyota Celica GT-Four ST165	6h 57m 21s
59ème Rallye Automobile de Monte-Carlo; 24 to 30 January 1991; Round 1 of the World Rally Championship	27 stages 626 km	2	(Italy) Miki Biasion (Italy) Tiziano Siviero	(Italy) Martini Lancia (Italy) Lancia Delta Integrale 16V	7h 2m 20s
59ème Rallye Automobile de Monte-Carlo; 24 to 30 January 1991; Round 1 of the World Rally Championship	27 stages 626 km	3	(France) François Delecour (France) Anne-Chantal Pauwels	(United Kingdom) Q8 Team Ford (United Kingdom) Ford Sierra RS Cosworth 4x4	7h 2m 33s
60ème Rallye Automobile de Monte-Carlo; 23 to 28 January 1992; Round 1 of the World Rally Championship	26 stages 606 km	1	(France) Didier Auriol (France) Bernard Occelli	(Italy) Martini Racing (Italy) Lancia Delta HF Integrale	6h 54m 20s
60ème Rallye Automobile de Monte-Carlo; 23 to 28 January 1992; Round 1 of the World Rally Championship	26 stages 606 km	2	(Spain) Carlos Sainz (Spain) Luis Moya	(Germany) Toyota Team Europe (Japan) Toyota Celica Turbo 4WD	6h 56m 25s
60ème Rallye Automobile de Monte-Carlo; 23 to 28 January 1992; Round 1 of the World Rally Championship	26 stages 606 km	3	(Finland) Juha Kankkunen (Finland) Juha Piironen	(Italy) Martini Racing (Italy) Lancia Delta HF Integrale	6h 57m 17s
61ème Rallye Automobile de Monte-Carlo; 21 to 27 January 1993; Round 1 of the World Rally Championship	22 stages 594 km	1	(France) Didier Auriol (France) Bernard Occelli	(Germany) Toyota Castrol Team (Japan) Toyota Celica Turbo 4WD	6h 13m 43s
61ème Rallye Automobile de Monte-Carlo; 21 to 27 January 1993; Round 1 of the World Rally Championship	22 stages 594 km	2	(France) François Delecour (France) Daniel Grataloup	(United Kingdom) Ford Motor Company (United Kingdom) Ford Escort RS Cosworth	6h 13m 58s
61ème Rallye Automobile de Monte-Carlo; 21 to 27 January 1993; Round 1 of the World Rally Championship	22 stages 594 km	3	(Italy) Miki Biasion (Italy) Tiziano Siviero	(United Kingdom) Ford Motor Company (United Kingdom) Ford Escort RS Cosworth	6h 16m 59s
62ème Rallye Automobile de Monte-Carlo; 22 to 27 January 1994; Round 1 of the World Rally Championship	22 stages 588 km	1	(France) François Delecour (France) Daniel Grataloup	(United Kingdom) Ford Motor Company (United Kingdom) Ford Escort RS Cosworth	6h 12m 20s
62ème Rallye Automobile de Monte-Carlo; 22 to 27 January 1994; Round 1 of the World Rally Championship	22 stages 588 km	2	(Finland) Juha Kankkunen (United Kingdom) Nicky Grist	(Germany) Toyota Castrol Team (Japan) Toyota Celica Turbo 4WD	6h 13m 25s
62ème Rallye Automobile de Monte-Carlo; 22 to 27 January 1994; Round 1 of the World Rally Championship	22 stages 588 km	3	(Spain) Carlos Sainz (Spain) Luis Moya	(Japan) 555 Subaru World Rally Team (Japan) Subaru Impreza 555	6h 14m 7s
63ème Rallye Automobile de Monte-Carlo; 22 to 26 January 1995; Round 1 of the World Rally Championship; Round 1 of the FIA 2-Litre World Championship for Manufacturers	21 stages 547 km	1	(Spain) Carlos Sainz (Spain) Luis Moya	(Japan) 555 Subaru World Rally Team (Japan) Subaru Impreza 555	6h 32m 31s
63ème Rallye Automobile de Monte-Carlo; 22 to 26 January 1995; Round 1 of the World Rally Championship; Round 1 of the FIA 2-Litre World Championship for Manufacturers	21 stages 547 km	2	(France) François Delecour (France) Catherine François	(United Kingdom) RAS Ford (United Kingdom) Ford Escort RS Cosworth	6h 34m 56s
63ème Rallye Automobile de Monte-Carlo; 22 to 26 January 1995; Round 1 of the World Rally Championship; Round 1 of the FIA 2-Litre World Championship for Manufacturers	21 stages 547 km	3	(Finland) Juha Kankkunen (United Kingdom) Nicky Grist	(Germany) Toyota Team Europe (Japan) Toyota Celica GT-Four ST205	6h 36m 28s
64ème Rallye Automobile de Monte-Carlo; 20 to 25 January 1996; Round 1 of the FIA 2-Litre World Championship for Manufacturers, no World Rally Championship	21 stages 427 km	1	(France) Patrick Bernardini (France) Bernard Occelli	(France) Alliance Yacco Ford (United Kingdom) Ford Escort RS Cosworth	5h 24m 40s
64ème Rallye Automobile de Monte-Carlo; 20 to 25 January 1996; Round 1 of the FIA 2-Litre World Championship for Manufacturers, no World Rally Championship	21 stages 427 km	2	(France) François Delecour (France) Hervé Sauvage	(France) Peugeot Sport (France) Peugeot 306 Maxi	5h 28m 24s
64ème Rallye Automobile de Monte-Carlo; 20 to 25 January 1996; Round 1 of the FIA 2-Litre World Championship for Manufacturers, no World Rally Championship	21 stages 427 km	3	(Germany) Armin Schwarz (Germany) Klaus Wicha	(Italy) H. F. Grifone (Japan) Toyota Celica GT-Four ST205	5h 31m 52s
65ème Rallye Automobile de Monte-Carlo; 19 to 27 January 1997; Round 1 of the World Rally Championship	18 stages 410 km	1	(Italy) Piero Liatti (Italy) Fabrizia Pons	(Japan) 555 Subaru World Rally Team (Japan) Subaru Impreza WRC97	4h 26m 58s
65ème Rallye Automobile de Monte-Carlo; 19 to 27 January 1997; Round 1 of the World Rally Championship	18 stages 410 km	2	(Spain) Carlos Sainz (Spain) Luis Moya	(United Kingdom) Ford Motor Company (United Kingdom) Ford Escort WRC	4h 27m 53s
65ème Rallye Automobile de Monte-Carlo; 19 to 27 January 1997; Round 1 of the World Rally Championship	18 stages 410 km	3	(Finland) Tommi Mäkinen (Finland) Seppo Harjanne	(Japan) Team Mitsubishi Ralliart (Japan) Mitsubishi Lancer Evo IV	4h 29m 29s
66ème Rallye Automobile de Monte-Carlo; 19 to 21 January 1998; Round 1 of the World Rally Championship	18 stages 359 km	1	(Spain) Carlos Sainz (Spain) Luis Moya	(Germany) Toyota Castrol Team (Japan) Toyota Corolla WRC	4h 28m 0.5s
66ème Rallye Automobile de Monte-Carlo; 19 to 21 January 1998; Round 1 of the World Rally Championship	18 stages 359 km	2	(Finland) Juha Kankkunen (Finland) Juha Repo	(United Kingdom) Ford Motor Company (United Kingdom) Ford Escort WRC	4h 28m 41.3s
66ème Rallye Automobile de Monte-Carlo; 19 to 21 January 1998; Round 1 of the World Rally Championship	18 stages 359 km	3	(United Kingdom) Colin McRae (United Kingdom) Nicky Grist	(Japan) 555 Subaru World Rally Team (Japan) Subaru Impreza WRC 98	4h 29m 1.5s
67ème Rallye Automobile de Monte-Carlo; 17 to 20 January 1999; Round 1 of the World Rally Championship	14 stages 425 km	1	(Finland) Tommi Mäkinen (Finland) Risto Mannisenmäki	(Japan) Marlboro Mitsubishi Ralliart (Japan) Mitsubishi Lancer Evo VI	5h 16m 50.6s
67ème Rallye Automobile de Monte-Carlo; 17 to 20 January 1999; Round 1 of the World Rally Championship	14 stages 425 km	2	(Finland) Juha Kankkunen (Finland) Juha Repo	(Japan) Subaru World Rally Team (Japan) Subaru Impreza WRC 99	5h 18m 35.3s
67ème Rallye Automobile de Monte-Carlo; 17 to 20 January 1999; Round 1 of the World Rally Championship	14 stages 425 km	3	(United Kingdom) Colin McRae (United Kingdom) Nicky Grist	(United Kingdom) Ford Motor Company (United Kingdom) Ford Focus WRC	5h 20m 7.4s

=== 2000–2009 ===
Rally name	Stages	Podium finishers			
Rally name	Stages	Rank	Driver Co-driver	Team Car	Time
68ème Rallye Automobile de Monte-Carlo; 21 to 23 January 2000; Round 1 of the World Rally Championship	15 stages 413 km	1	(Finland) Tommi Mäkinen (Finland) Risto Mannisenmäki	(Japan) Marlboro Mitsubishi Ralliart (Japan) Mitsubishi Lancer Evo VI	4h 23m 35.8s
68ème Rallye Automobile de Monte-Carlo; 21 to 23 January 2000; Round 1 of the World Rally Championship	15 stages 413 km	2	(Spain) Carlos Sainz (Spain) Luis Moya	(United Kingdom) Ford Motor Company (United Kingdom) Ford Focus RS WRC 00	4h 25m 0.7s
68ème Rallye Automobile de Monte-Carlo; 21 to 23 January 2000; Round 1 of the World Rally Championship	15 stages 413 km	3	(Finland) Juha Kankkunen (Finland) Juha Repo	(Japan) Subaru World Rally Team (Japan) Subaru Impreza WRC 99	4h 26m 57.2s
69ème Rallye Automobile de Monte-Carlo; 19 to 21 January 2001; Round 1 of the World Rally Championship	15 stages 392 km	1	(Finland) Tommi Mäkinen (Finland) Risto Mannisenmäki	(Japan) Marlboro Mitsubishi Ralliart (Japan) Mitsubishi Lancer Evo VI	4h 38m 4.3s
69ème Rallye Automobile de Monte-Carlo; 19 to 21 January 2001; Round 1 of the World Rally Championship	15 stages 392 km	2	(Spain) Carlos Sainz (Spain) Luis Moya	(United Kingdom) Ford Motor Company (United Kingdom) Ford Focus RS WRC 01	4h 39m 5.1s
69ème Rallye Automobile de Monte-Carlo; 19 to 21 January 2001; Round 1 of the World Rally Championship	15 stages 392 km	3	(France) François Delecour (France) Daniel Gratloup	(United Kingdom) Ford Motor Company (United Kingdom) Ford Focus RS WRC 01	4h 40m 9.6s
70ème Rallye Automobile de Monte-Carlo; 18 to 20 January 2002; Round 1 of the World Rally Championship	15 stages 397 km	1	(Finland) Tommi Mäkinen (Finland) Kaj Lindström	(Japan) Subaru World Rally Team (Japan) Subaru Impreza WRC 2001	3h 59m 30.7s
70ème Rallye Automobile de Monte-Carlo; 18 to 20 January 2002; Round 1 of the World Rally Championship	15 stages 397 km	2	(France) Sébastien Loeb (Monaco) Daniel Elena	(France) Automobiles Citroën (France) Citroën Xsara WRC	4h 0m 44.8s
70ème Rallye Automobile de Monte-Carlo; 18 to 20 January 2002; Round 1 of the World Rally Championship	15 stages 397 km	3	(Spain) Carlos Sainz (Spain) Luis Moya	(United Kingdom) Ford Motor Company (United Kingdom) Ford Focus RS WRC 02	4h 0m 46.4s
71ème Rallye Automobile de Monte-Carlo; 23 to 26 January 2003; Round 1 of the World Rally Championship	14 stages 415 km	1	(France) Sébastien Loeb (Monaco) Daniel Elena	(France) Citroën Total (France) Citroën Xsara WRC	4h 29m 11.4s
71ème Rallye Automobile de Monte-Carlo; 23 to 26 January 2003; Round 1 of the World Rally Championship	14 stages 415 km	2	(United Kingdom) Colin McRae (United Kingdom) Derek Ringer	(France) Citroën Total (France) Citroën Xsara WRC	4h 29m 49.5s
71ème Rallye Automobile de Monte-Carlo; 23 to 26 January 2003; Round 1 of the World Rally Championship	14 stages 415 km	3	(Spain) Carlos Sainz (Spain) Marc Marti	(France) Citroën Total (France) Citroën Xsara WRC	4h 30m 3.6s
72ème Rallye Automobile de Monte-Carlo; 23 to 25 January 2004; Round 1 of the World Rally Championship	15 stages 389 km	1	(France) Sébastien Loeb (Monaco) Daniel Elena	(France) Citroën Total (France) Citroën Xsara WRC	4h 12m 3.0s
72ème Rallye Automobile de Monte-Carlo; 23 to 25 January 2004; Round 1 of the World Rally Championship	15 stages 389 km	2	(Estonia) Markko Märtin (United Kingdom) Michael Park	(United Kingdom) Ford Motor Company (United Kingdom) Ford Focus RS WRC 03	4h 13m 15.6s
72ème Rallye Automobile de Monte-Carlo; 23 to 25 January 2004; Round 1 of the World Rally Championship	15 stages 389 km	3	(Belgium) François Duval (Belgium) Stéphane Prévot	(United Kingdom) Ford Motor Company (United Kingdom) Ford Focus RS WRC 03	4h 13m 22.6s
73ème Rallye Automobile de Monte-Carlo; 21 to 23 January 2005; Round 1 of the World Rally Championship	15 stages 353 km	1	(France) Sébastien Loeb (Monaco) Daniel Elena	(France) Citroën Total (France) Citroën Xsara WRC	4h 13m 5.6s
73ème Rallye Automobile de Monte-Carlo; 21 to 23 January 2005; Round 1 of the World Rally Championship	15 stages 353 km	2	(Finland) Toni Gardemeister (Finland) Jakke Honkanen	(United Kingdom) BP Ford World Rally Team (United Kingdom) Ford Focus RS WRC 04	4h 16m 3.9s
73ème Rallye Automobile de Monte-Carlo; 21 to 23 January 2005; Round 1 of the World Rally Championship	15 stages 353 km	3	(France) Gilles Panizzi (France) Hervé Panizzi	(Japan) Mitsubishi Motorsports (Japan) Mitsubishi Lancer WRC 05	4h 16m 45.7s
74ème Rallye Automobile de Monte-Carlo; 19 to 22 January 2006; Round 1 of the World Rally Championship	18 stages 366 km	1	(Finland) Marcus Grönholm (Finland) Timo Rautiainen	(United Kingdom) BP Ford World Rally Team (United Kingdom) Ford Focus RS WRC 06	4h 11m 43.9 ss
74ème Rallye Automobile de Monte-Carlo; 19 to 22 January 2006; Round 1 of the World Rally Championship	18 stages 366 km	2	(France) Sébastien Loeb (Monaco) Daniel Elena	(France) Kronos Total Citroën World Rally Team (France) Citroën Xsara WRC	4h 12m 45.7s
74ème Rallye Automobile de Monte-Carlo; 19 to 22 January 2006; Round 1 of the World Rally Championship	18 stages 366 km	3	(Finland) Toni Gardemeister (Finland) Jakke Honkanen	(Italy) Astra Racing (France) Peugeot 307 WRC	4h 13m 7.0s
75ème Rallye Automobile de Monte-Carlo; 18 to 21 January 2007; Round 1 of the World Rally Championship	15 stages 329 km	1	(France) Sébastien Loeb (Monaco) Daniel Elena	(France) Citroën Total (France) Citroën C4 WRC	3h 10m 27.4s
75ème Rallye Automobile de Monte-Carlo; 18 to 21 January 2007; Round 1 of the World Rally Championship	15 stages 329 km	2	(Spain) Dani Sordo (Spain) Marc Marti	(France) Citroën Total (France) Citroën C4 WRC	3h 11m 5.6s
75ème Rallye Automobile de Monte-Carlo; 18 to 21 January 2007; Round 1 of the World Rally Championship	15 stages 329 km	3	(Finland) Marcus Grönholm (Finland) Timo Rautiainen	(United Kingdom) BP Ford World Rally Team (United Kingdom) Ford Focus RS WRC 06	3h 11m 50.2s
76ème Rallye Automobile de Monte-Carlo; 24 to 27 January 2008; Round 1 of the World Rally Championship	19 stages 365.09 km	1	(France) Sébastien Loeb (Monaco) Daniel Elena	(France) Citroën Total (France) Citroën C4 WRC	3h 39m 17.0s
76ème Rallye Automobile de Monte-Carlo; 24 to 27 January 2008; Round 1 of the World Rally Championship	19 stages 365.09 km	2	(Finland) Mikko Hirvonen (Finland) Jarmo Lehtinen	(United Kingdom) BP Ford World Rally Team (United Kingdom) Ford Focus RS WRC 07	3h 41m 51.4s
76ème Rallye Automobile de Monte-Carlo; 24 to 27 January 2008; Round 1 of the World Rally Championship	19 stages 365.09 km	3	(Australia) Chris Atkinson (Belgium) Stéphane Prévot	(Japan) Subaru World Rally Team (Japan) Subaru Impreza WRC 2007	3h 42m 15.6s
77ème Rallye Automobile de Monte-Carlo; 21 to 24 January 2009; Round 1 of the 2009 Intercontinental Rally Challenge	14 stages 362.25 km	1	(France) Sébastien Ogier (France) Julien Ingrassia	(France) BF Goodrich (France) Peugeot 207 S2000	4h 40m 45.7s
77ème Rallye Automobile de Monte-Carlo; 21 to 24 January 2009; Round 1 of the 2009 Intercontinental Rally Challenge	14 stages 362.25 km	2	(Belgium) Freddy Loix (Belgium) Isidoor Smets	(Belgium) Peugeot Team Belux (France) Peugeot 207 S2000	4h 42m 29.3s
77ème Rallye Automobile de Monte-Carlo; 21 to 24 January 2009; Round 1 of the 2009 Intercontinental Rally Challenge	14 stages 362.25 km	3	(France) Stéphane Sarrazin (France) Jacques Julien Renucci	(France) Team Peugeot Total (France) Peugeot 207 S2000	4h 43m 07.3s

=== 2010–2019 ===
Rally name	Stages	Podium finishers			
Rally name	Stages	Rank	Driver Co-driver	Team Car	Time
78ème Rallye Automobile de Monte-Carlo; 19 to 23 January 2010; Round 1 of the 2010 Intercontinental Rally Challenge	15 stages 396.18 km	1	(Finland) Mikko Hirvonen (Finland) Jarmo Lehtinen	(United Kingdom) M-Sport (United Kingdom) Ford Fiesta S2000	4h 32m 58.5s
78ème Rallye Automobile de Monte-Carlo; 19 to 23 January 2010; Round 1 of the 2010 Intercontinental Rally Challenge	15 stages 396.18 km	2	(Finland) Juho Hänninen (Finland) Mikko Markkula	(Czech Republic) Škoda Motorsport (Czech Republic) Škoda Fabia S2000	4h 34m 49.9s
78ème Rallye Automobile de Monte-Carlo; 19 to 23 January 2010; Round 1 of the 2010 Intercontinental Rally Challenge	15 stages 396.18 km	3	(France) Nicolas Vouilloz (France) Benjamin Veillas	(Czech Republic) Škoda Motorsport (Czech Republic) Škoda Fabia S2000	4h 36m 17.6s
79ème Rallye Automobile de Monte-Carlo; 19 to 22 January 2011; Round 1 of the 2011 Intercontinental Rally Challenge	13 stages 337.06 km	1	(France) Bryan Bouffier (France) Xavier Panseri	Peugeot France; Peugeot 207 S2000	3h 32m 55.6s
79ème Rallye Automobile de Monte-Carlo; 19 to 22 January 2011; Round 1 of the 2011 Intercontinental Rally Challenge	13 stages 337.06 km	2	(Belgium) Freddy Loix (Belgium) Frédéric Miclotte	(Czech Republic) Škoda Motorsport (Czech Republic) Škoda Fabia S2000	3h 33m 28.1s
79ème Rallye Automobile de Monte-Carlo; 19 to 22 January 2011; Round 1 of the 2011 Intercontinental Rally Challenge	13 stages 337.06 km	3	(United Kingdom) Guy Wilks (United Kingdom) Phil Pugh	(United Kingdom) Peugeot UK (France) Peugeot 207 S2000	3h 34m 15.3s
80ème Rallye Automobile de Monte-Carlo; 18 to 22 January 2012; Round 1 of the 2012 World Rally Championship	17 stages 433.36 km	1	(France) Sébastien Loeb (Monaco) Daniel Elena	(France) Citroën Total World Rally Team (France) Citroën DS3 WRC	4h 32m 39.9s
80ème Rallye Automobile de Monte-Carlo; 18 to 22 January 2012; Round 1 of the 2012 World Rally Championship	17 stages 433.36 km	2	(Spain) Dani Sordo (Spain) Carlos del Barrio	(United Kingdom) Mini WRC Team (United Kingdom) Mini John Cooper Works WRC	4h 35m 25.4s
80ème Rallye Automobile de Monte-Carlo; 18 to 22 January 2012; Round 1 of the 2012 World Rally Championship	17 stages 433.36 km	3	(Norway) Petter Solberg (United Kingdom) Chris Patterson	(United Kingdom) Ford World Rally Team (United Kingdom) Ford Fiesta RS WRC	4h 35m 54.1s
81ème Rallye Automobile de Monte-Carlo; 16 to 19 January 2013; Round 1 of the 2013 World Rally Championship	18 stages 478.42 km	1	(France) Sébastien Loeb (Monaco) Daniel Elena	(France) Citroën Total Abu Dhabi World Rally Team (France) Citroën DS3 WRC	5h 18m 57.2s
81ème Rallye Automobile de Monte-Carlo; 16 to 19 January 2013; Round 1 of the 2013 World Rally Championship	18 stages 478.42 km	2	(France) Sébastien Ogier (France) Julien Ingrassia	(Germany) Volkswagen Motorsport (Germany) Volkswagen Polo R WRC	5h 20m 37.1s
81ème Rallye Automobile de Monte-Carlo; 16 to 19 January 2013; Round 1 of the 2013 World Rally Championship	18 stages 478.42 km	3	(Spain) Dani Sordo (Spain) Carlos del Barrio	(France) Abu Dhabi Citroën Total World Rally Team (France) Citroën DS3 WRC	5h 22m 46.2s
82ème Rallye Automobile de Monte-Carlo; 14 to 18 January 2014; Round 1 of the 2014 World Rally Championship	15 stages 383.88 km	1	(France) Sébastien Ogier (France) Julien Ingrassia	(Germany) Volkswagen Motorsport (Germany) Volkswagen Polo R WRC	3h 55m 14.4s
82ème Rallye Automobile de Monte-Carlo; 14 to 18 January 2014; Round 1 of the 2014 World Rally Championship	15 stages 383.88 km	2	(France) Bryan Bouffier (France) Xavier Panseri	(United Kingdom) M-Sport WRT (United Kingdom) Ford Fiesta RS WRC	3h 56m 33.3s
82ème Rallye Automobile de Monte-Carlo; 14 to 18 January 2014; Round 1 of the 2014 World Rally Championship	15 stages 383.88 km	3	(United Kingdom) Kris Meeke (Republic of Ireland) Paul Nagle	(France) Citroën Total Abu Dhabi WRT (France) Citroën DS3 WRC	3h 57m 08.7s
83ème Rallye Automobile de Monte-Carlo; 22 to 25 January 2015; Round 1 of the 2015 World Rally Championship	15 (14)^{†} stages 355.48 (335.55)^{†} km	1	(France) Sébastien Ogier (France) Julien Ingrassia	(Germany) Volkswagen Motorsport (Germany) Volkswagen Polo R WRC	3h 36m 40.2s
83ème Rallye Automobile de Monte-Carlo; 22 to 25 January 2015; Round 1 of the 2015 World Rally Championship	15 (14)^{†} stages 355.48 (335.55)^{†} km	2	(Finland) Jari-Matti Latvala (Finland) Miikka Anttila	(Germany) Volkswagen Motorsport (Germany) Volkswagen Polo R WRC	3h 37m 38.2s
83ème Rallye Automobile de Monte-Carlo; 22 to 25 January 2015; Round 1 of the 2015 World Rally Championship	15 (14)^{†} stages 355.48 (335.55)^{†} km	3	(Norway) Andreas Mikkelsen (Norway) Ole Floene	(Germany) Volkswagen Motorsport II (Germany) Volkswagen Polo R WRC	3h 38m 52.5s
84ème Rallye Automobile Monte-Carlo; 22 to 24 January 2016; Round 1 of the 2016 World Rally Championship	16 stages 377.59 km	1	(France) Sébastien Ogier (France) Julien Ingrassia	(Germany) Volkswagen Motorsport (Germany) Volkswagen Polo R WRC	3h 49m 53.1s
84ème Rallye Automobile Monte-Carlo; 22 to 24 January 2016; Round 1 of the 2016 World Rally Championship	16 stages 377.59 km	2	(Norway) Andreas Mikkelsen (Norway) Anders Jæger	(Germany) Volkswagen Motorsport II (Germany) Volkswagen Polo R WRC	3h 51m 47.6s
84ème Rallye Automobile Monte-Carlo; 22 to 24 January 2016; Round 1 of the 2016 World Rally Championship	16 stages 377.59 km	3	(Belgium) Thierry Neuville (Belgium) Nicolas Gilsoul	(South Korea) Hyundai Motorsport (South Korea) Hyundai i20 WRC	3h 53m 11.0s
85ème Rallye Automobile Monte-Carlo; 19 to 22 January 2017; Round 1 of the 2017 World Rally Championship	17 (15)^{†} stages 382.65 (355.90)^{†} km	1	(France) Sébastien Ogier (France) Julien Ingrassia	(United Kingdom) M-Sport World Rally Team (United Kingdom) Ford Fiesta WRC	4h 00m 03.6s
85ème Rallye Automobile Monte-Carlo; 19 to 22 January 2017; Round 1 of the 2017 World Rally Championship	17 (15)^{†} stages 382.65 (355.90)^{†} km	2	(Finland) Jari-Matti Latvala (Finland) Miikka Anttila	(Japan) Toyota Gazoo Racing WRT (Japan) Toyota Yaris WRC	4h 02m 18.6s
85ème Rallye Automobile Monte-Carlo; 19 to 22 January 2017; Round 1 of the 2017 World Rally Championship	17 (15)^{†} stages 382.65 (355.90)^{†} km	3	(Estonia) Ott Tänak (Estonia) Martin Järveoja	(United Kingdom) M-Sport World Rally Team (United Kingdom) Ford Fiesta WRC	4h 03m 01.4s
86ème Rallye Automobile Monte-Carlo; 25 to 28 January 2018; Round 1 of the 2018 World Rally Championship	17 stages 394.74 km	1	(France) Sébastien Ogier (France) Julien Ingrassia	(United Kingdom) M-Sport World Rally Team (United Kingdom) Ford Fiesta WRC	4h 18m 55.5s
86ème Rallye Automobile Monte-Carlo; 25 to 28 January 2018; Round 1 of the 2018 World Rally Championship	17 stages 394.74 km	2	(Estonia) Ott Tänak (Estonia) Martin Järveoja	(Japan) Toyota Gazoo Racing WRT (Japan) Toyota Yaris WRC	4h 19m 53.8s
86ème Rallye Automobile Monte-Carlo; 25 to 28 January 2018; Round 1 of the 2018 World Rally Championship	17 stages 394.74 km	3	(Finland) Jari-Matti Latvala (Finland) Miikka Anttila	(Japan) Toyota Gazoo Racing WRT (Japan) Toyota Yaris WRC	4h 20m 47.5s
87ème Rallye Automobile Monte-Carlo; 24 to 27 January 2019; Round 1 of the 2019 World Rally Championship	16 (15)^{†} stages 323.83 (303.79)^{†} km	1	(France) Sébastien Ogier (France) Julien Ingrassia	(France) Citroën Total WRT (France) Citroën C3 WRC	3h 21m 15.9s
87ème Rallye Automobile Monte-Carlo; 24 to 27 January 2019; Round 1 of the 2019 World Rally Championship	16 (15)^{†} stages 323.83 (303.79)^{†} km	2	(Belgium) Thierry Neuville (Belgium) Nicolas Gilsoul	(South Korea) Hyundai Shell Mobis WRT (South Korea) Hyundai i20 Coupe WRC	3h 21m 18.1s
87ème Rallye Automobile Monte-Carlo; 24 to 27 January 2019; Round 1 of the 2019 World Rally Championship	16 (15)^{†} stages 323.83 (303.79)^{†} km	3	(Estonia) Ott Tänak (Estonia) Martin Järveoja	(Japan) Toyota Gazoo Racing WRT (Japan) Toyota Yaris WRC	3h 23m 31.1s

=== 2020– ===
Rally name	Stages	Podium finishers			
Rally name	Stages	Rank	Driver Co-driver	Team Car	Time
88ème Rallye Automobile Monte-Carlo; 23 to 26 January 2020; Round 1 of the 2020 World Rally Championship	16 stages 304.28 km	1	(Belgium) Thierry Neuville (Belgium) Nicolas Gilsoul	(South Korea) Hyundai Shell Mobis WRT (South Korea) Hyundai i20 Coupe WRC	3h 10m 57.6s
88ème Rallye Automobile Monte-Carlo; 23 to 26 January 2020; Round 1 of the 2020 World Rally Championship	16 stages 304.28 km	2	(France) Sébastien Ogier (France) Julien Ingrassia	(Japan) Toyota Gazoo Racing WRT (Japan) Toyota Yaris WRC	3h 11m 10.2s
88ème Rallye Automobile Monte-Carlo; 23 to 26 January 2020; Round 1 of the 2020 World Rally Championship	16 stages 304.28 km	3	(United Kingdom) Elfyn Evans (United Kingdom) Scott Martin	(Japan) Toyota Gazoo Racing WRT (Japan) Toyota Yaris WRC	3h 11m 11.9s
89ème Rallye Automobile Monte-Carlo; 21 to 24 January 2021; Round 1 of the 2021 World Rally Championship	14 stages 257.64 km	1	(France) Sébastien Ogier (France) Julien Ingrassia	(Japan) Toyota Gazoo Racing WRT (Japan) Toyota Yaris WRC	2h 56m 33.7s
89ème Rallye Automobile Monte-Carlo; 21 to 24 January 2021; Round 1 of the 2021 World Rally Championship	14 stages 257.64 km	2	(United Kingdom) Elfyn Evans (United Kingdom) Scott Martin	(Japan) Toyota Gazoo Racing WRT (Japan) Toyota Yaris WRC	2h 57m 06.3s
89ème Rallye Automobile Monte-Carlo; 21 to 24 January 2021; Round 1 of the 2021 World Rally Championship	14 stages 257.64 km	3	(Belgium) Thierry Neuville (Belgium) Martijn Wydaeghe	(South Korea) Hyundai Shell Mobis WRT (South Korea) Hyundai i20 Coupe WRC	2h 57m 47.2s
90ème Rallye Automobile Monte-Carlo; 20 to 23 January 2022; Round 1 of the 2022 World Rally Championship	17 stages 296.03 km	1	(France) Sébastien Loeb (France) Isabelle Galmiche	(United Kingdom) M-Sport Ford WRT (United Kingdom) Ford Puma Rally1	3h 00m 32.8s
90ème Rallye Automobile Monte-Carlo; 20 to 23 January 2022; Round 1 of the 2022 World Rally Championship	17 stages 296.03 km	2	(France) Sébastien Ogier (France) Benjamin Veillas	(Japan) Toyota Gazoo Racing WRT (Japan) Toyota GR Yaris Rally1	3h 00m 43.3s
90ème Rallye Automobile Monte-Carlo; 20 to 23 January 2022; Round 1 of the 2022 World Rally Championship	17 stages 296.03 km	3	(Republic of Ireland) Craig Breen (Republic of Ireland) Paul Nagle	(United Kingdom) M-Sport Ford WRT (United Kingdom) Ford Puma Rally1	3h 02m 12.6s
91ème Rallye Automobile Monte-Carlo; 19 to 22 January 2023; Round 1 of the 2023 World Rally Championship	18 stages 325.02 km	1	(France) Sébastien Ogier (France) Vincent Landais	(Japan) Toyota Gazoo Racing WRT (Japan) Toyota GR Yaris Rally1	3h 12m 02.0s
91ème Rallye Automobile Monte-Carlo; 19 to 22 January 2023; Round 1 of the 2023 World Rally Championship	18 stages 325.02 km	2	(Finland) Kalle Rovanperä (Finland) Jonne Halttunen	(Japan) Toyota Gazoo Racing WRT (Japan) Toyota GR Yaris Rally1	3h 12m 20.8s
91ème Rallye Automobile Monte-Carlo; 19 to 22 January 2023; Round 1 of the 2023 World Rally Championship	18 stages 325.02 km	3	(Belgium) Thierry Neuville (Belgium) Martijn Wydaeghe	(South Korea) Hyundai Shell Mobis WRT (South Korea) Hyundai i20 N Rally1	3h 12m 46.6s
92ème Rallye Automobile Monte-Carlo; 25 to 28 January 2024; Round 1 of the 2024 World Rally Championship	17 stages 324.44 km	1	(Belgium) Thierry Neuville (Belgium) Martijn Wydaeghe	(South Korea) Hyundai Shell Mobis WRT (South Korea) Hyundai i20 N Rally1	3h 9m 30.9s
92ème Rallye Automobile Monte-Carlo; 25 to 28 January 2024; Round 1 of the 2024 World Rally Championship	17 stages 324.44 km	2	(France) Sébastien Ogier (France) Vincent Landais	(Japan) Toyota Gazoo Racing WRT (Japan) Toyota GR Yaris Rally1	3h 9m 47.0s
92ème Rallye Automobile Monte-Carlo; 25 to 28 January 2024; Round 1 of the 2024 World Rally Championship	17 stages 324.44 km	3	(United Kingdom) Elfyn Evans (United Kingdom) Scott Martin	(Japan) Toyota Gazoo Racing WRT (Japan) Toyota GR Yaris Rally1	3h 10m 16.1s
93ème Rallye Automobile Monte-Carlo; 23 to 26 January 2025; Round 1 of the 2025 World Rally Championship	18 (17)^{†} stages 343.80 (333.06)^{†} km	1	(France) Sébastien Ogier (France) Vincent Landais	(Japan) Toyota Gazoo Racing WRT (Japan) Toyota GR Yaris Rally1	3h 19m 06.1s
93ème Rallye Automobile Monte-Carlo; 23 to 26 January 2025; Round 1 of the 2025 World Rally Championship	18 (17)^{†} stages 343.80 (333.06)^{†} km	2	(United Kingdom) Elfyn Evans (United Kingdom) Scott Martin	(Japan) Toyota Gazoo Racing WRT (Japan) Toyota GR Yaris Rally1	3h 19m 24.6s
93ème Rallye Automobile Monte-Carlo; 23 to 26 January 2025; Round 1 of the 2025 World Rally Championship	18 (17)^{†} stages 343.80 (333.06)^{†} km	3	(France) Adrien Fourmaux (France) Alexandre Coria	(South Korea) Hyundai Shell Mobis WRT (South Korea) Hyundai i20 N Rally1	3h 19m 32.1s
94ème Rallye Automobile Monte-Carlo; 22 to 25 January 2026; Round 1 of the 2026 World Rally Championship	17 stages 339.15 km	1	(Sweden) Oliver Solberg (United Kingdom) Elliott Edmondson	(Japan) Toyota Gazoo Racing WRT (Japan) Toyota GR Yaris Rally1	4h 24m 59.0s
94ème Rallye Automobile Monte-Carlo; 22 to 25 January 2026; Round 1 of the 2026 World Rally Championship	17 stages 339.15 km	2	(United Kingdom) Elfyn Evans (United Kingdom) Scott Martin	(Japan) Toyota Gazoo Racing WRT (Japan) Toyota GR Yaris Rally1	4h 25m 50.8s
94ème Rallye Automobile Monte-Carlo; 22 to 25 January 2026; Round 1 of the 2026 World Rally Championship	17 stages 339.15 km	3	(France) Sébastien Ogier (France) Vincent Landais	(Japan) Toyota Gazoo Racing WRT (Japan) Toyota GR Yaris Rally1	4h 27m 01.2s

- † – Event was shortened after stages were cancelled.

== Multiple winners ==
Year in italic was not WRC event

Wins	Driver	Years won
10	(France) Sébastien Ogier	2009, 2014, 2015, 2016, 2017, 2018, 2019, 2021, 2023, 2025
8	(France) Sébastien Loeb	2003, 2004, 2005, 2007, 2008, 2012, 2013, 2022
4	(France) Jean Trévoux	1934, 1939, 1949, 1951
4	(Italy) Sandro Munari	1972, 1975, 1976, 1977
4	(Germany) Walter Röhrl	1980, 1982, 1983, 1984
4	(Finland) Tommi Mäkinen	1999, 2000, 2001, 2002
3	(France) Didier Auriol	1990, 1992, 1993
3	(Spain) Carlos Sainz	1991, 1995, 1998
2
2	(Sweden) Björn Waldegård	1969, 1970
2	(Sweden) Erik Carlsson	1962, 1963
2	(Italy) Miki Biasion	1987, 1989
2	(Belgium) Thierry Neuville	2020, 2024

Wins	Manufacturers
13	Lancia
10	Citroën, Ford
7	Toyota
6	Hotchkiss
4	Porsche, Renault, Peugeot
3	Delahaye, Mini, Mitsubishi, Subaru, Volkswagen
2	Fiat, Saab, Hyundai

== Related events ==
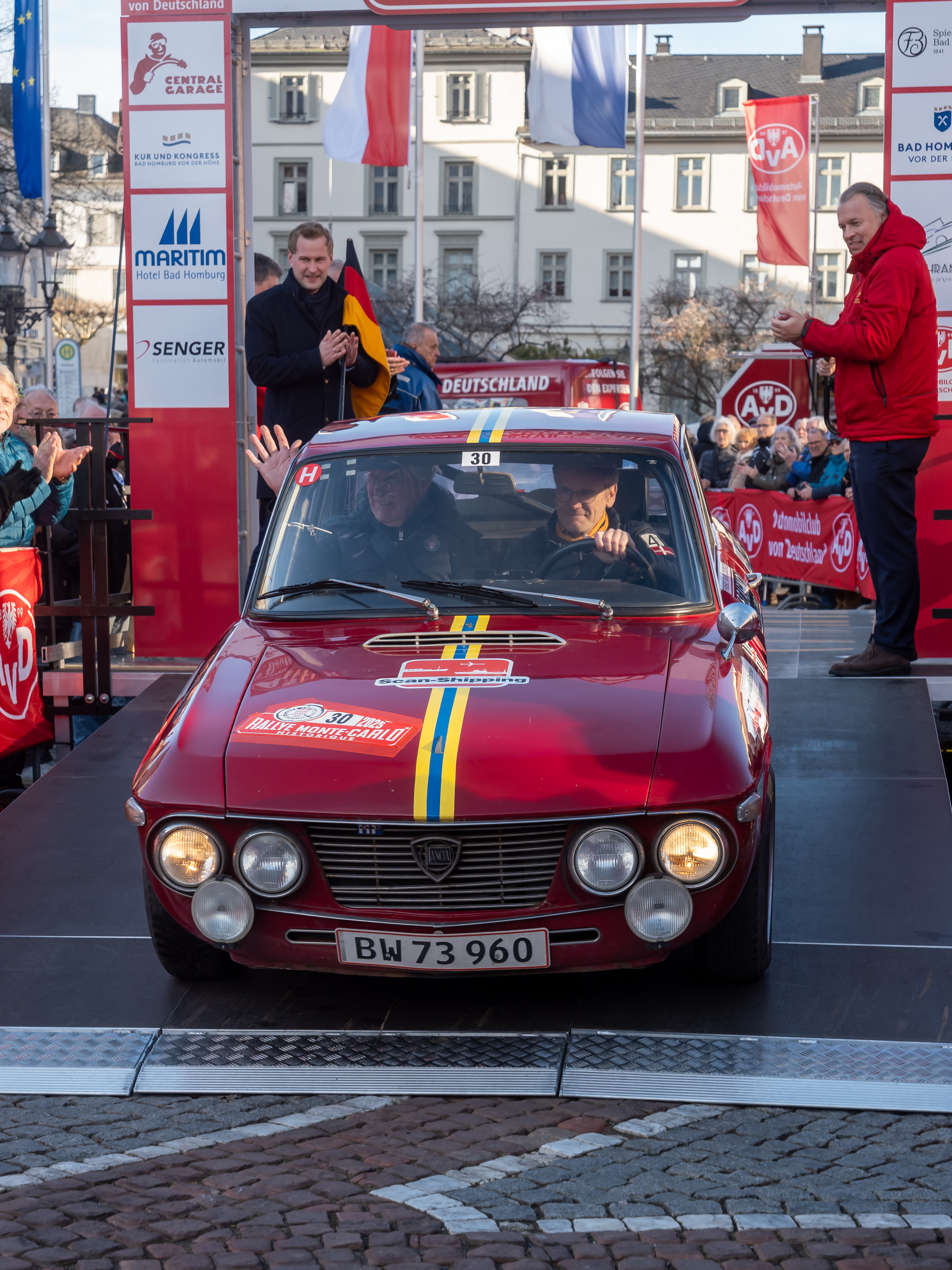
Start of the Rallye Monte-Carlo Historique 2025 in Bad Homburg vor der Höhe

The Monte Carlo Historic Rally (officially Rallye Monte-Carlo Historique) is a classic regularity rally held annually since 1998. The event currently takes place one week after the contemporary rally, and is open for car models from the 1960s through the early 1980s that participated in earlier editions of the original race. Unlike the contemporary rally it's still a concentration rally with multiple departures throughout Europe.

The Classic Monte-Carlo Classic Rally (officially Rallye Monte-Carlo Classique) was a classic touring rally held annually from 2017 to 2022. It took place at the same time as the historic rally, and was open to cars from the 1910s through the early 1960s.

The Monte Carlo E-Rally (officially E-Rallye Monte-Carlo) is a regularity rally for alternative fuel vehicles, held annually under different names from 1995 to 1999 and later since 2005. It currently takes place in late October as part of the FIA ecoRally Cup.

== See also ==
- Monte Carlo or Bust!
- Herbie Goes to Monte Carlo
