= Ronnie Adams =

British rally driver (1916–2004)

Ronald James Adams
- Born: 8 March 1916; Belfast, Ireland
- Died: 12 April 2004 (aged 88)
- Occupation: Race car driver

Ronald James Adams (8 March 1916 – 12 April 2004) was a British rally driver from Belfast.

== Career ==
Born into a successful business family, Ronnie Adams was educated at Rockport School in Holywood, Co Down. Adams won the 1956 Monte Carlo Rally, for Jaguar, whose team was the first to come from Ireland to do so, and was the first winner of the Circuit of Ireland rally in 1936 at the age of 20. During a 30-year motorsport career, Adams was one of the leading Ulstermen at this time, and became a Jaguar works driver following the war.

Due to petrol rationing in the 1940s he turned his attention to sailing and nearly made the 1948 Great Britain Olympic team.

In 1956 he and his co-drivers Frank Biggar and Derek Johnston had their most successful victory at the Monte Carlo Rally in January in a Jaguar Mark 7. They defeated the Mercedes-Benz 220 A of Walter Schock (West Germany) and the Sunbeam Mk3 of Peter Harper (UK).

Adams's international rallying career finally ended on medical advice, due to an irregular heartbeat.

== Rally results ==
Year	Rally	Car	Co-driver	Result
1956	Rally Monte Carlo	Jaguar Mk7 M	Frank Biggar & Derek Johnston	1st
