= Jaguar Mark VII =

Jaguar Mark VII Jaguar Mark VII M
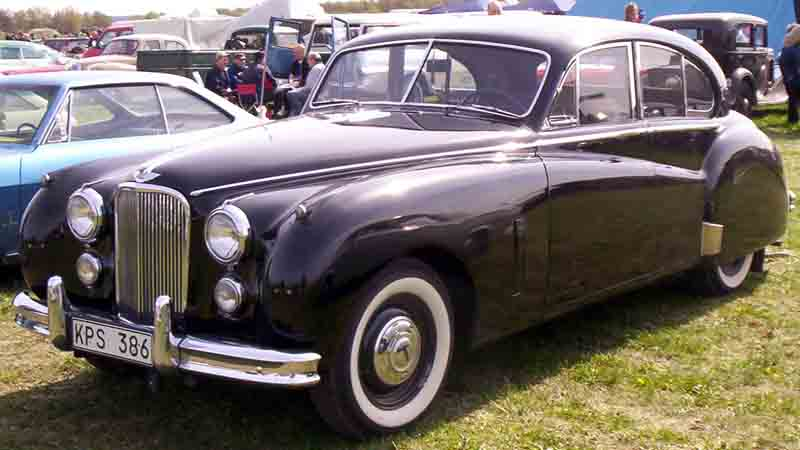
- 1954 Jaguar Mark VII

Overview
- Manufacturer: Jaguar Cars
- Production: 1950–1956; 30,969 produced
- Assembly: United Kingdom: Coventry, England

Body and chassis
- Class: Full-size luxury car (F)
- Body style: 4-door saloon

Powertrain
- Engine: 1951–1954: 3442 cc I6, 160 bhp (119.3 kW); 1954–1956: 3442 cc I6, 190 bhp (141.7 kW)

Dimensions
- Wheelbase: 120 in (3,048 mm)
- Length: 196.5 in (4,991 mm)
- Width: 73 in (1,854 mm)
- Kerb weight: 3,696 lb (1,676 kg) MarK VII; 3,724 lb (1,689 kg) MarK VII M

Chronology
- Predecessor: Jaguar Mark V
- Successor: Jaguar Mark VIII

The Jaguar Mark VII is a four-door luxury car produced by Jaguar Cars of Coventry from 1950 to 1956. Launched at the 1950 British International Motor Show as the successor to the Jaguar Mark V, it was called the Mark VII because there was already a Bentley Mark VI on the market. A version of the Jaguar Mark V with the XK engine had been designated as the Mark VI, but it is thought that only two were built.

In its original 1950 form the Mark VII could exceed 100 mph, and in 1952 it became the first Jaguar to be made available with an optional automatic transmission.

Mark VIIs were successful in racing and rallying.

== Mark VII (1950–1954) ==
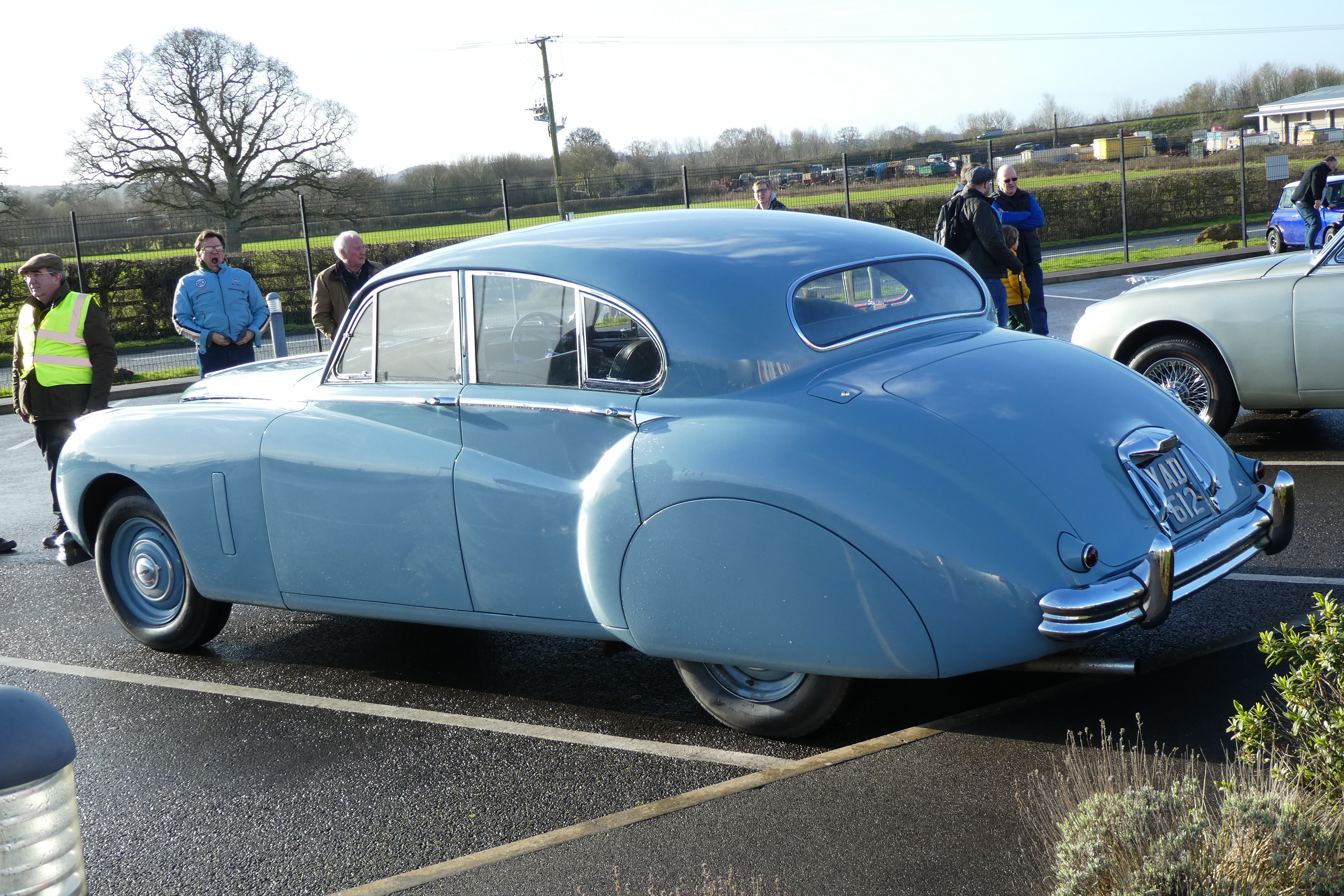
Jaguar Mark VII rear

The Mark VII chassis came from the Jaguar Mark V and the wheelbase remained the same at 10 feet (3,048.0 mm). The new model's body looked more streamlined, with integrated headlights and mudguards, a two-piece windscreen, and longer rear overhang. As on the Mark V, the rear wheels were partially covered by removable spats.

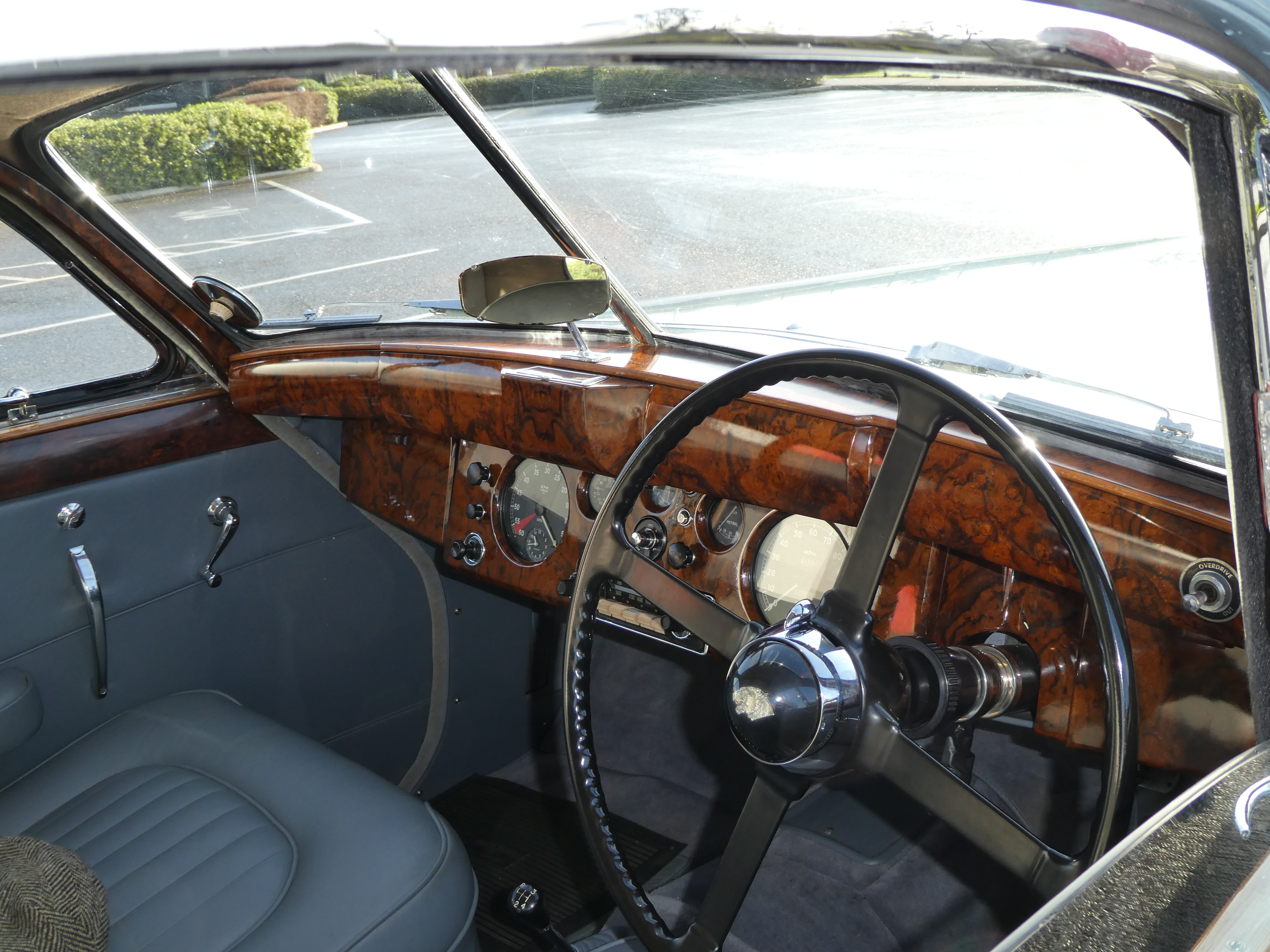
Jaguar Mark VII interior

Whereas the Mark V had a prewar pushrod engine originally developed by the Standard Motor Company, the Mark VII was powered by the newly developed XK engine. First seen in production form in the 1948 XK120, the 3442 cc DOHC straight-six provided 160 bhp (119.3 kW), the same as in the XK120, and the saloon's claimed top speed was over 100 mph (160 km/h).

When the car was being developed, Jaguar thought it would find most of its customers overseas, mainly because UK car tax at that time penalised buyers of larger-engined cars. However it went into production just as Britain's postwar economic austerity began to ease, and in 1951 the car's enthusiastic reception in both the British and American markets prompted Jaguar to relocate production to larger premises, at the Browns Lane plant, which had been built for wartime production as a shadow factory and was now available for immediate use.

The published performance figures for the Mark VII were based on the standard 8:1 compression ratio, but as this was unsuitable for the UK market's low-octane Pool petrol, a 7:1 engine was optional. British motoring magazines tested the car's performance with the higher compression ratio, using the Ostend to Brussels autoroute in Belgium, where 80 octane fuel was available. A Mark VII tested by The Motor in 1952 had a top speed of 101 mph (163 km/h), accelerated from 0–60 mph (97 km/h) in 13.7 seconds, and returned 17.6 miles per imperial gallon (16.1 L/100 km; 14.7 mpg_{‑US}). The test car cost £1693 including taxes.

In 1952 the Mark VII became the first Jaguar to be offered with an automatic transmission.

By the time the model was upgraded to M specification in 1954, 20,908 had been produced.

== Mark VII M (1954–1956) ==
The Mark VII M was launched at the British International Motor Show in October 1954. New high-lift cams increased power output to 190 bhp (141.7 kW), giving the car a claimed top speed of 104 mph (167 km/h).

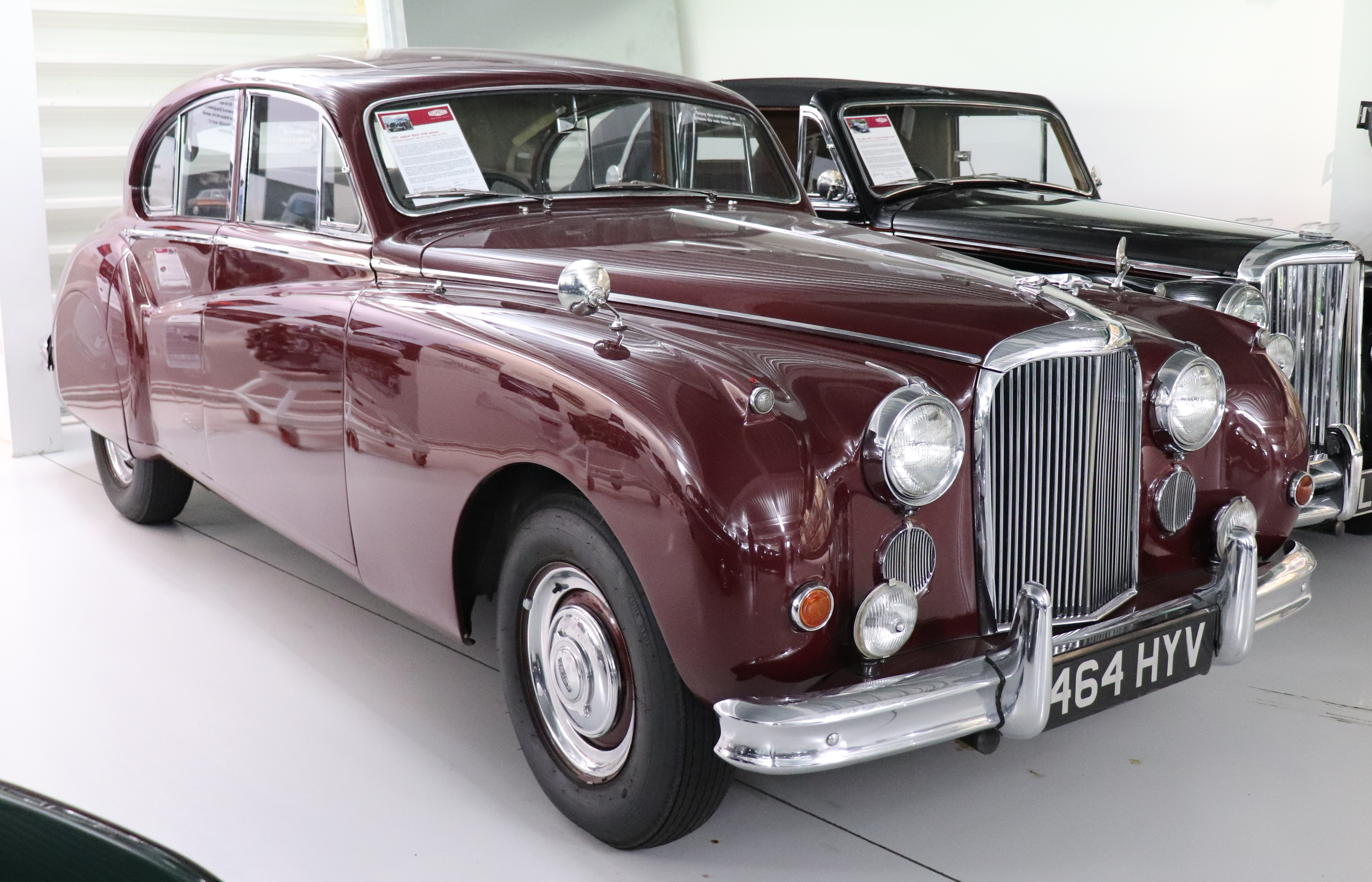
Jaguar Mark VII M

The standard four-speed manual gearbox gained constant mesh and was fitted with closer ratios, while the Borg Warner automatic, previously available only on exported Mark VIIs, became optional for British buyers. Larger torsion bars were fitted to the front suspension. Flasher-type traffic indicators replaced semaphore arms front and rear.

In front, circular grilles over the horns were installed below the headlights in place of the former integrated auxiliary lamps, which were moved slightly further apart, up-rated and mounted on the bumper. Both bumpers wrapped further around the sides of the car. New large tail lamps with built-in reflectors incorporated direction indicators. New headlamps were given Le Mans type diffuser glasses. Seats became full length and incorporated Dunlopillo.

In 1956, with the advent of the Suez Crisis, Britain anticipated fuel rationing, and bubble cars appeared on the streets. Jaguar switched focus to their smaller saloons (the Mark I 2.4 had been introduced in 1955), and neither the Mark VII M nor any of its increasingly powerful but fuel-thirsty successors would match the production volumes of the original Jaguar Mark VII. A total of 10,061 Mark VII M's were sold during its two-year production run, before being superseded by the Mark VIII.

== Racing and rallying ==
Both variants of the Mark VII won race victories, and an M version won a Monte Carlo Rally.

In 1954 Jaguar built a lightweight Mark VII M which, although intended for racing, never participated in contemporary events. Road-registered KRW 621, it had magnesium body panels, D-type engine, Dunlop disc brakes and modified suspension.

Factory-entered Mark VIIs won the Daily Express International Trophy Production Touring Car race at Silverstone five years running, and twice took the top three places. Stirling Moss won in 1952 and 1953; Ian Appleyard in 1954, with Tony Rolt and Stirling Moss 2nd and 3rd; Mike Hawthorn in 1955, from his teammates Jimmy Stewart and Desmond Titterington in 2nd and 3rd; and Ivor Bueb in 1956, with Belgian journalist and racing driver Paul Frère taking 4th.

In January 1956 a Mark VII M driven by Ronnie Adams, Frank Biggar, and Derek Johnstone won the Monte Carlo Rally.

In August 1956, at Road America, in Elkhart Lake, Wisconsin, Paul Goldsmith's Mark VII averaged 59.2 mph to win a 100-mile NASCAR Grand National race for cars up to 3500 cc.

== Sources ==
- Schrader, Halwart: Typenkompass Jaguar - Personenwagen seit 1931, Motorbuch-Verlag, Stuttgart (2001), ISBN 3-613-02106-4
- Stertkamp, Heiner: Jaguar - Die komplette Chronik von 1922 bis heute, 2. Auflage, Heel-Verlag (2006), ISBN 3-89880-337-6
