= Jaguar Mark V =

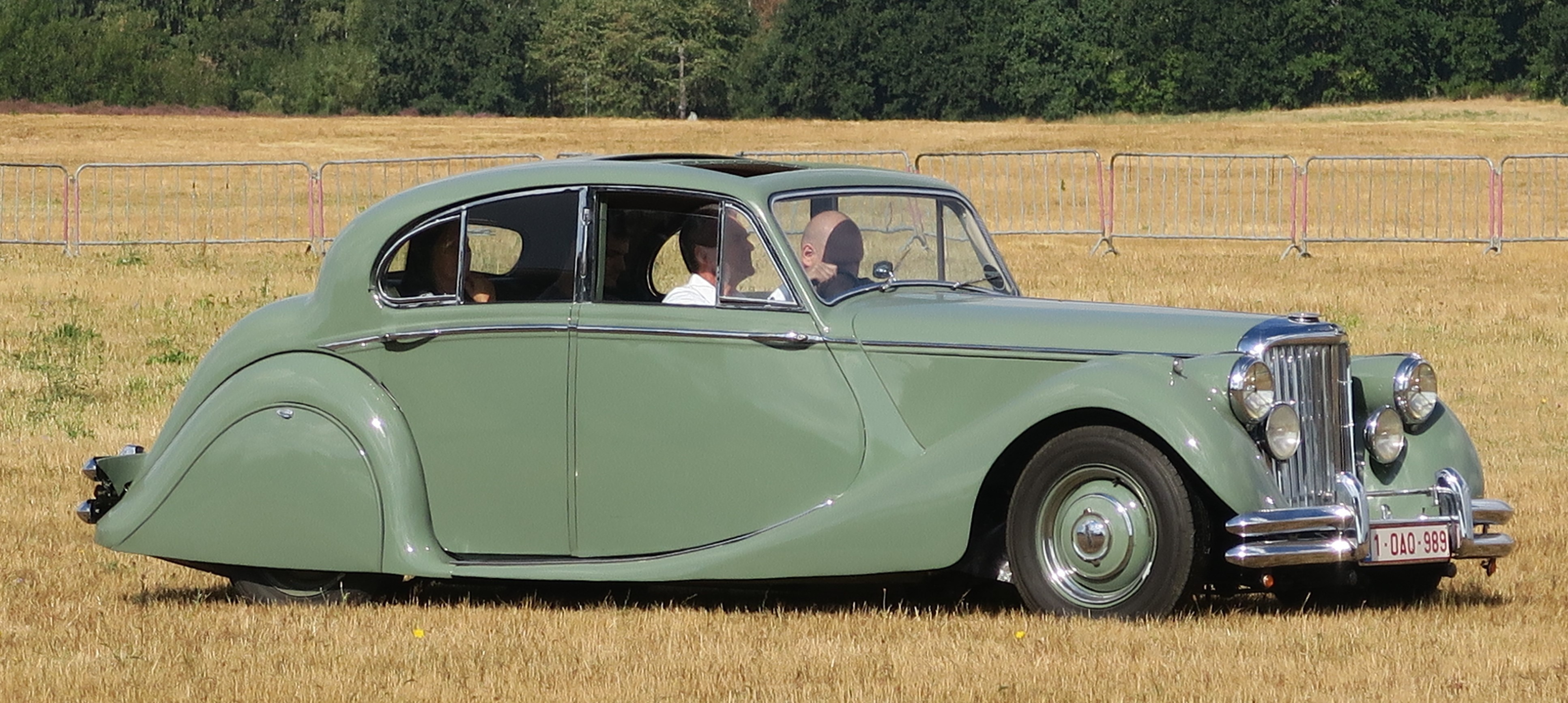
- 1949 saloon

Overview
- Manufacturer: Jaguar Cars
- Production: 1948–1951; 10,499 produced
- Assembly: United Kingdom: Coventry, England

Body and chassis
- Class: Executive car (E)
- Body style: saloon, drophead coupé

Powertrain
- Engine: 2664 cc or 3485 cc straight-6 pushrod ohv
- Transmission: four-speed manual

Dimensions
- Wheelbase: 120 in (3,048 mm)
- Length: 187.5 in (4,762 mm)
- Width: 69.5 in (1,765 mm)
- Height: 62.5 in (1,588 mm)

Chronology
- Predecessor: Jaguar 2½ Litre & 3½ Litre saloons
- Successor: Jaguar Mark VII

The Jaguar Mark V (pronounced mark five) is a luxury automobile built by Jaguar Cars Ltd of Coventry in England from 1948 to 1951. It was available as a four-door Saloon (sedan) and a two-door convertible known as the Drop Head Coupé, both versions seating five adults. It was the first Jaguar with independent front suspension, first with hydraulic brakes, first with spats (fender skirts), first specifically designed to be produced in both Right and Left Hand Drive configurations, first with disc centre wheels, first with smaller wider 16" balloon tyres, first to be offered with sealed headlamps and flashing turn signals for the important American market, and the last model to use the pushrod engines.

== History ==
The Mark V was introduced to distributors and the press on 30 September 1948 and launched on 27 October 1948 at the London Motor Show at the same time as the announcement of the XK120, with which it shared a stand. The XK120, though not quite ready for production, was the star of the show. However, the Mark V vastly outsold the XK120 by roughly 5,000 cars per year as compared to 2,000 cars per year for the XK120. Three cars were built in late 1948 and saloon production was well under way at the factory on Swallow Road at Holbrook Lane in the Foleshill district of Coventry by March 1949, though the DHC was delayed for some months, and the last cars were built in mid 1951.

== Features ==
While the XK120 had a new overhead-camshaft XK engine, the Mark V retained the 1946-48 driveline including the overhead-valve pushrod straight-6 2½L and 3½L engines, now since 1946 produced by Jaguar, which the company had purchased from the Standard Motor Company before the Second World War and the four-speed single-helical gearbox produced by both Jaguar and the Moss Gear Company of Birmingham. Automatic transmission was not available at this time. The 1½L Standard engine used in previous models was not offered in the Mark V. Claimed power output in this application was 102 bhp (76 kW) for the 2664 cc Mark V and 125 bhp (93 kW) for its more popular 3485 cc sibling.

The chassis frame was new with deep box sections and cross bracing for improved stiffness in handling and cornering, and independent front suspension by double wishbones and torsion bars, an arrangement that would be used by Jaguar for many future vehicles. It has weldments and brackets provided for both Left Hand and Right Hand Drive brake and clutch pedal linkages, so the chassis could be assembled in either configuration. It also had hydraulic brakes, which were necessary with the independent suspension, and which Jaguar had been slow to adopt compared to other manufacturers, and an all pressed steel body on the saloon, though the DHC still had wood framing in the doors. Another new feature was that the rear of the chassis swept over the rear axle to provide greater movement for improved comfort, whereas on previous models it had been underslung.

The styling of the car followed prewar SS-Jaguar lines with upright chrome grille and the leaping Jaguar radiator cap mascot was available as an option. The Autocar called it rich yet with unostentatious looks, in outline halfway between the old and new. There is a distinct hint of the recently modernised Bentley look in the style of the front grille.

The wheels were 16-inch (410 mm) steel-disc type, significantly smaller than the 18-inch (460 mm) wheels on the MK IV. From the side, a distinctive styling touch on the saloon was a "tuck in" curve at the base of the rear quarter window following the curved profile of the side glass, a feature retained on many subsequent models. Rear-wheel spats were standard. There was also a drophead coupé version.

For the UK and most foreign markets, 7.7" Lucas PF770 headlamps were used, along with flip-out trafficator semaphore turn indicators. For the important American market, 7" sealed headlights were used, along with flashing turn signals incorporated into the front side lamp and rear tail lamp units in place of trafficators.

The Mark V was available in 12 single paint colours, in various combinations with 7 upholstery colours, but the factory did not offer two-tone treatment, nor did they offer white wall tyres. Two cars were done by the factory in two-tone schemes, and 32 others in various special colours, for unknown reasons. Others may have been repainted as two-tone by American dealers before or after the sale, as well as fitting white wall tyres.

== Performance ==
A 3½ litre car tested by The Motor magazine in 1949 had a top speed of 90.7 mph (146.0 km/h) and could accelerate from 0–60 mph (97 km/h) in 20.4 seconds. The Autocar called the steering light at all speeds and free from road reaction, and said the new suspension showed great merit in comfort and stability, with performance figures very satisfactory. Jaguar's test engineer Norman Dewis used a Mark V regularly. When asked about the top speed he saw in his car, he commented that he verified 90 mph once, but the thrill of the moment did not encourage repeating the feat. (The speedometer is in front of the passenger.) A fuel consumption of 18.2 miles per imperial gallon (15.5 L/100 km; 15.2 mpg_{‑US}) was recorded. The test car cost £1263 including taxes.

== Production ==
Production figures were:

Engine	Style	Amount
2½ litre	RHD saloon	1481
2½ litre	RHD drop head coupé	17
2½ litre	LHD saloon	188
2½ litre	LHD drop head coupé	12
2½ litre	LHD chassis only	2 (to independent coachbuilder)
3½ litre	RHD saloon	5923
3½ litre	RHD drop head coupé	108
3½ litre	LHD saloon	1902
3½ litre	LHD drop head coupé	577
3½ litre	RHD chassis only	2 (motor show display chassis)
3½ litre	LHD chassis only	1 (to independent coachbuilder)
Total:		10,499

In 1951 the Mark V was replaced by the Jaguar Mark VII. The Mark VII had the same 10-foot (3.0 m) wheelbase as the Mark V, but a longer and more streamlined-looking body, which continued in production with little outward change through the Jaguars Mark VIII and Mark IX until 1961.

== The Mark V name ==
The origin of the Mark V name, always printed in company documents as a Roman numeral V, never an Arabic number 5, is somewhat mysterious as there had been no Mk I to IV Jaguars and the MK IV designation was only given to its predecessor after the launch of the Mark V.

Chairman and chief stylist William Lyons (Sir William after 1956) and his team of body-shop assistants known as panel beaters put together five prototype bodies with various chassis experiments in the 1946-1948 period before he was satisfied with the result, and the chosen one was known as Mark V in internal documents. Lyons explained this in a speech given on 30 September 1948 to introduce the new car to distributors and members of the press, so that is how the Mark V got its name. A photograph of the discarded prototypes survives with the Jaguar Daimler Heritage Trust.

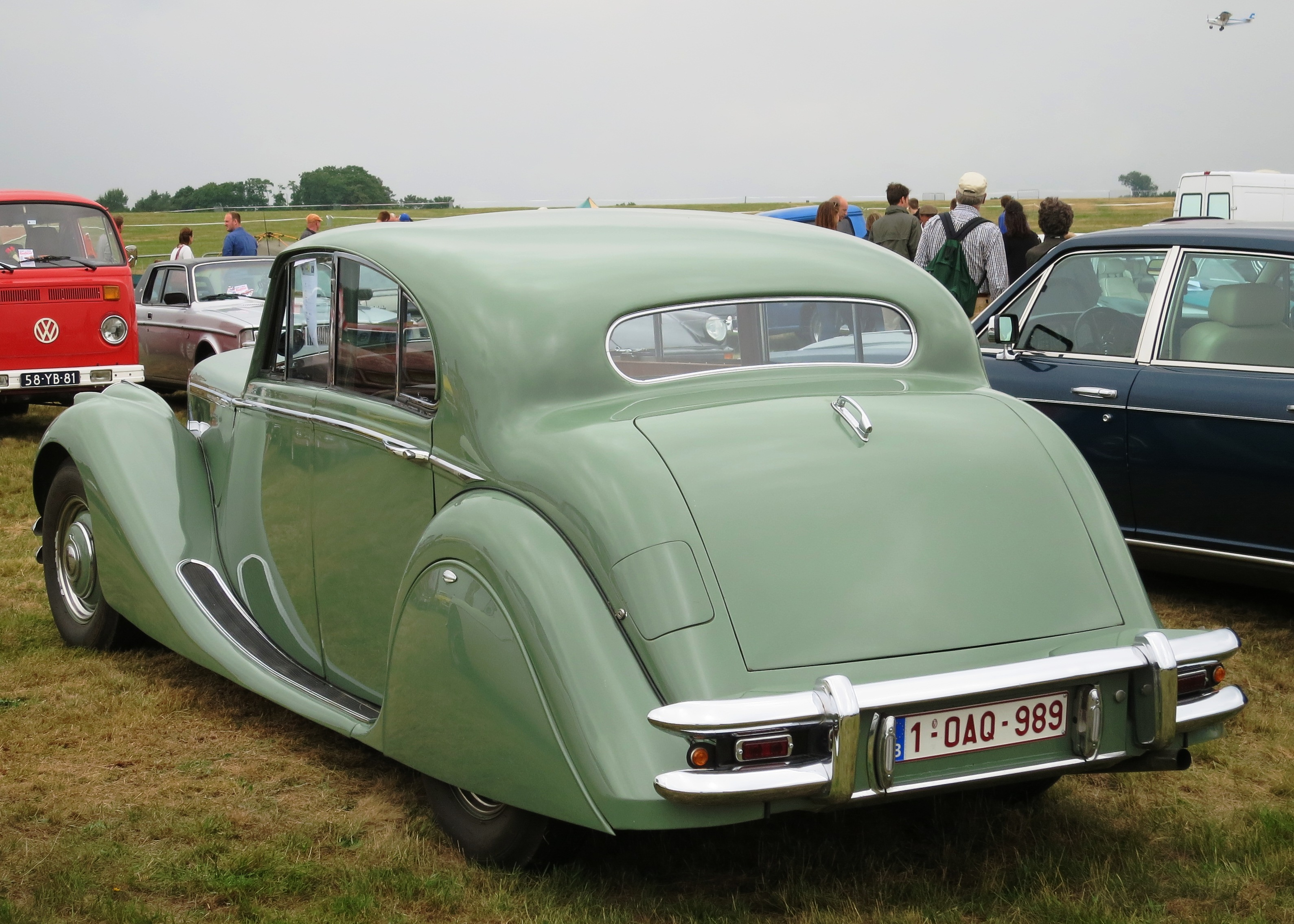
1949 saloon

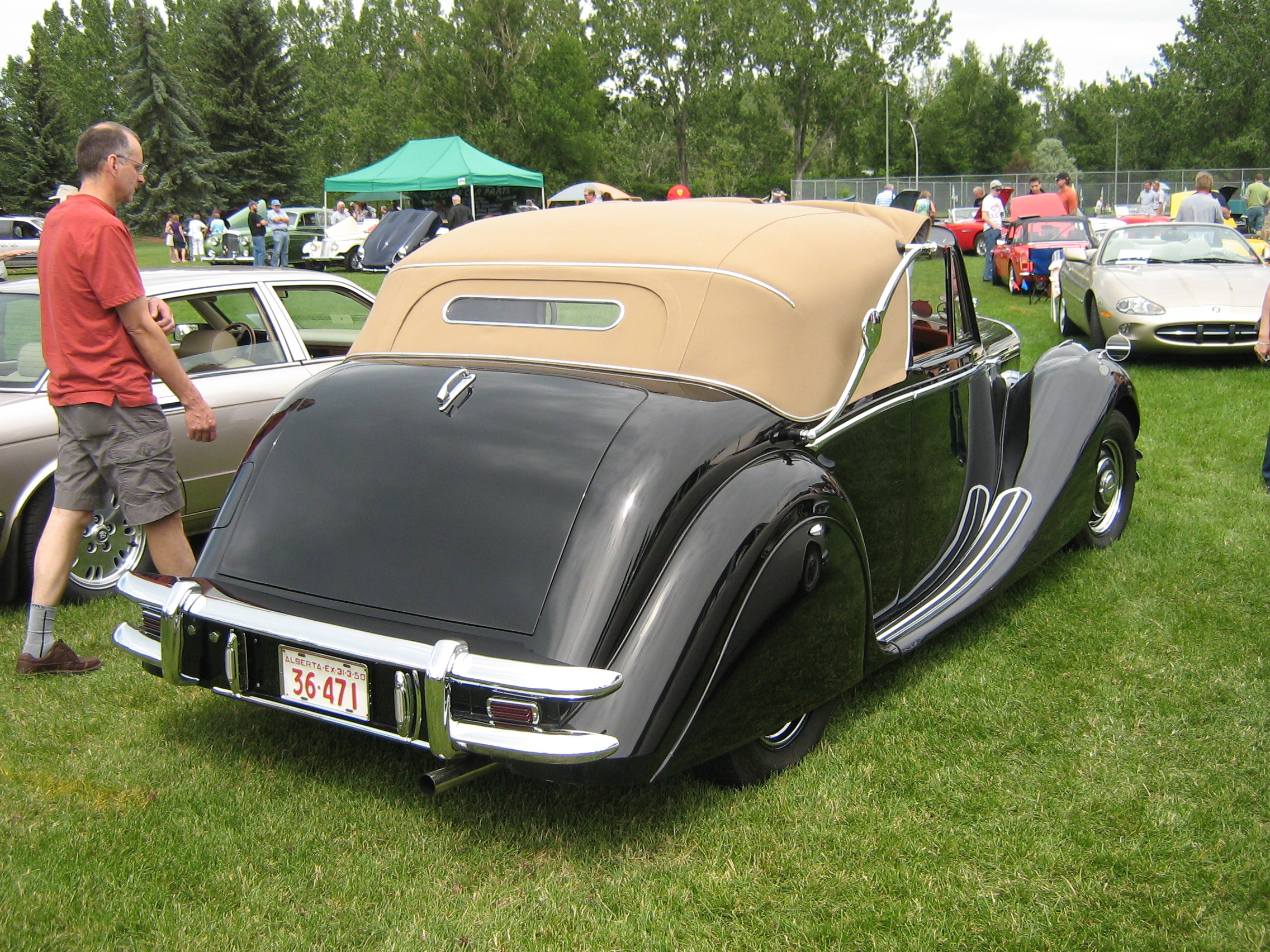
1949 drophead coupé

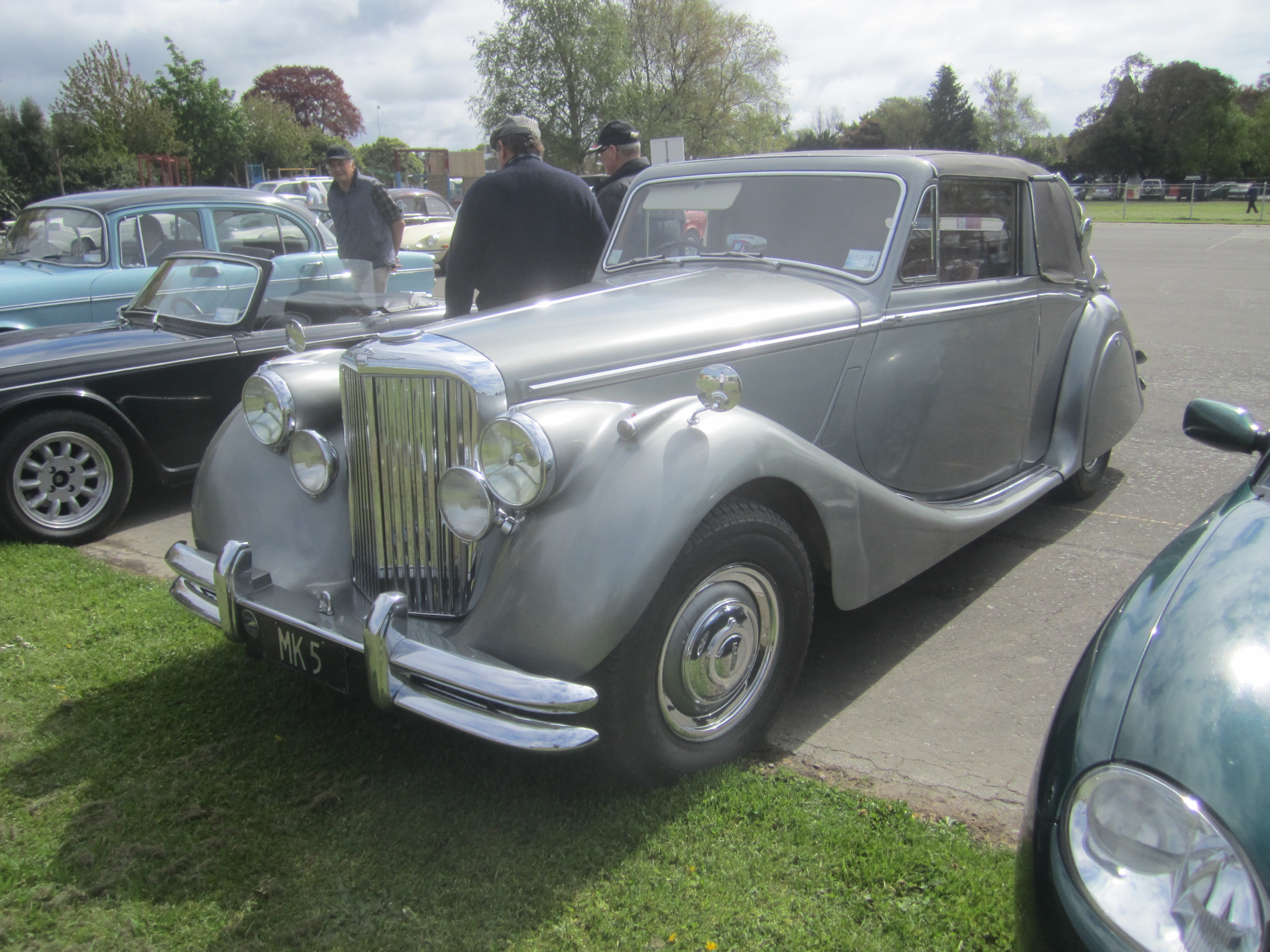
1951 2½ litre RHD drophead coupé

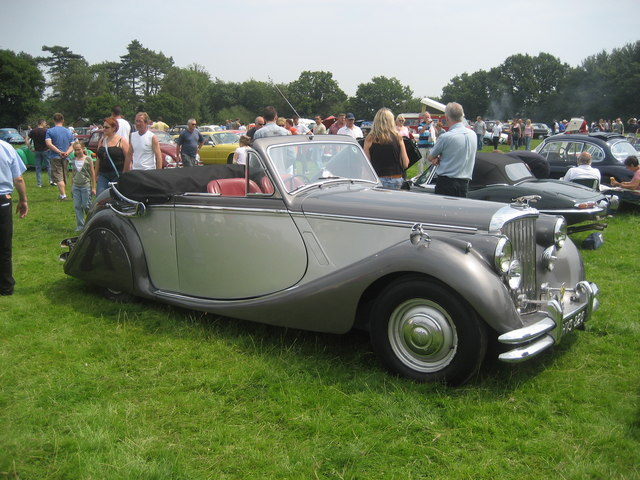
1951 3½ litre RHD drophead coupé
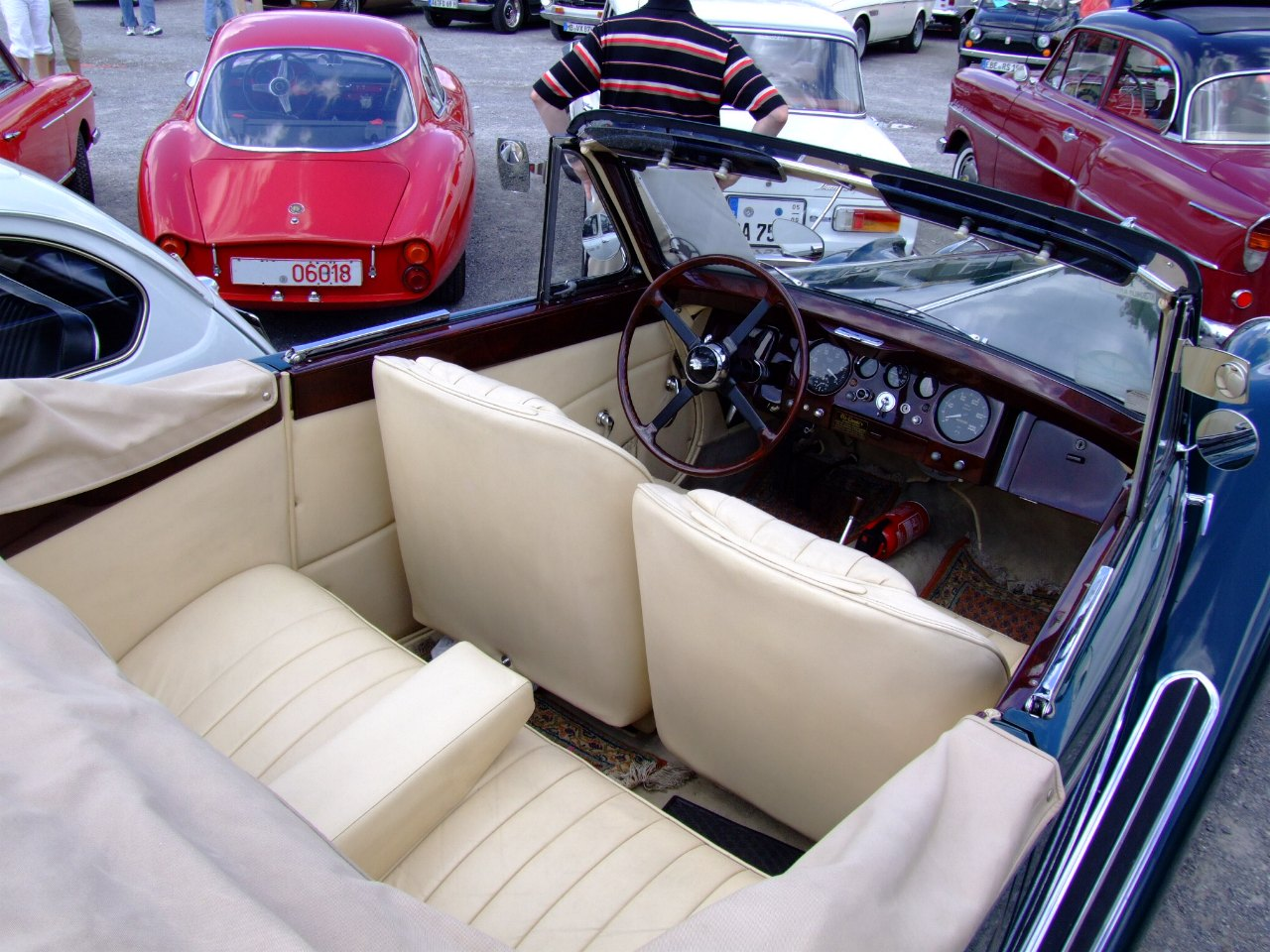
1948 drophead coupé

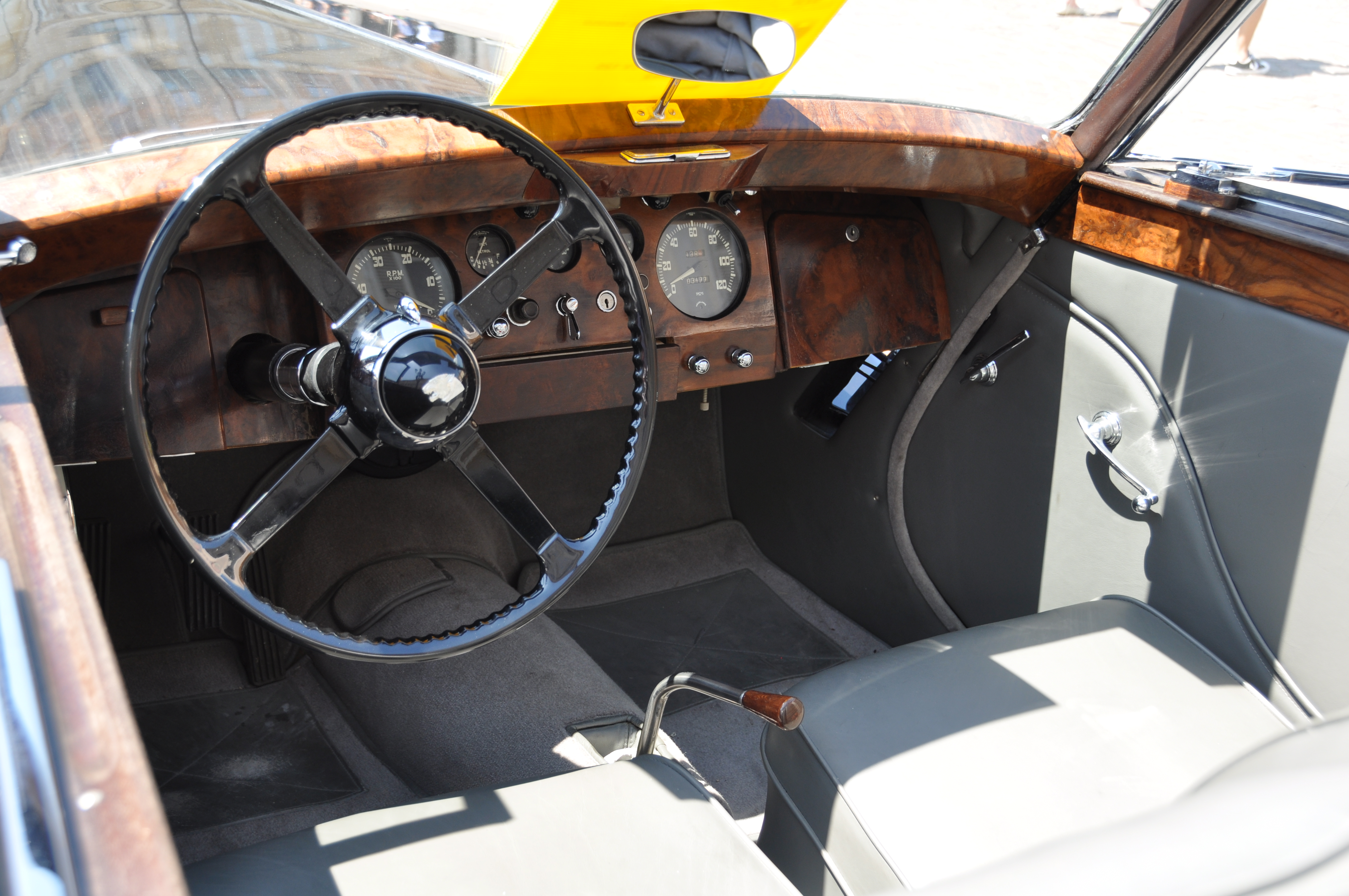
1949 drophead coupé

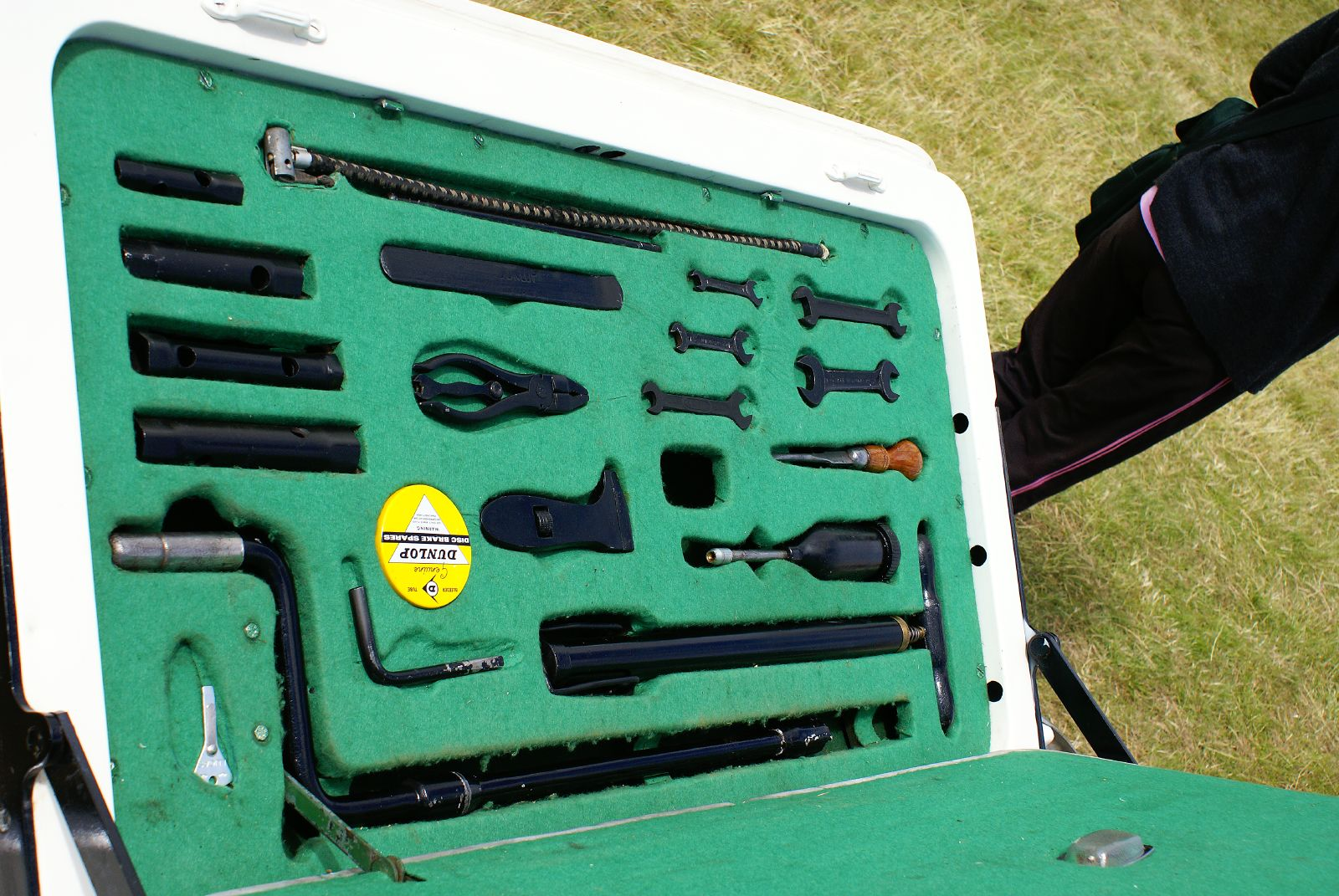
Inside a boot lid

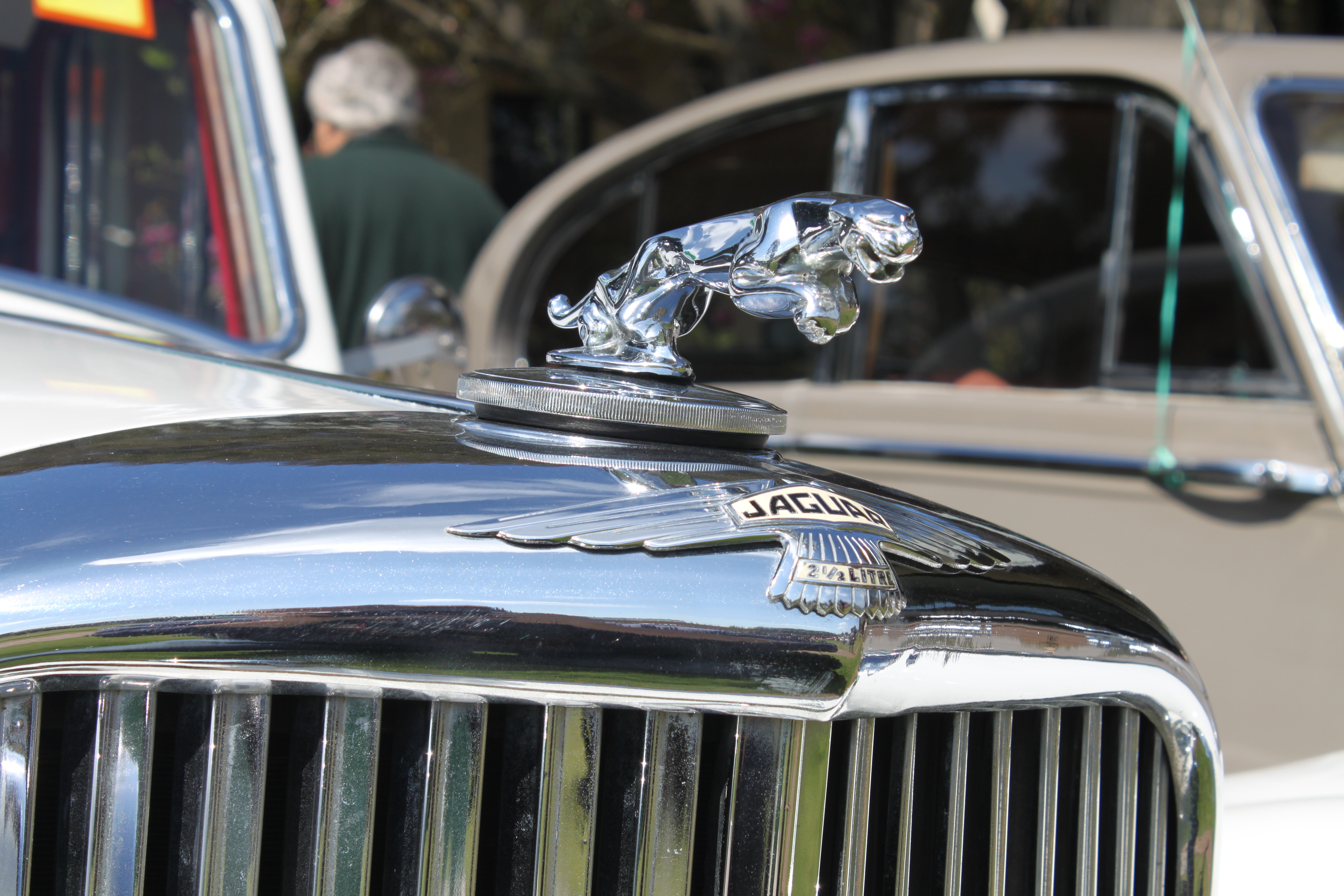
Engine identification
