= Mark (designation) =

Method of designating a version of a product

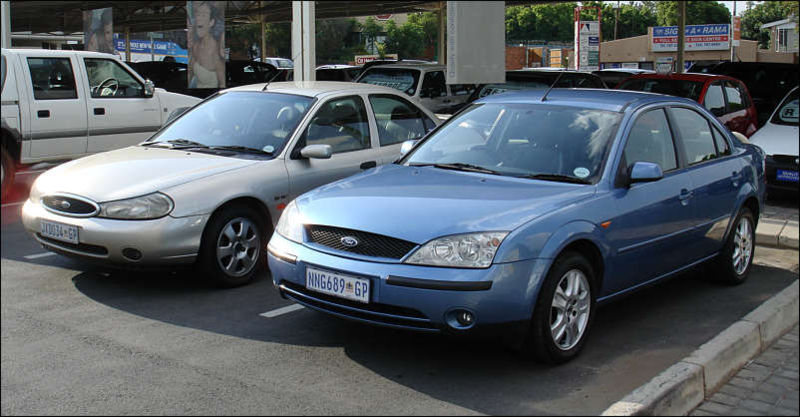
Two Ford Mondeo sedans, a Mk II (grey, left) and a Mk III (blue, right)

The word mark, followed by number, is a method of designating a version of a product. It is often abbreviated as Mk or M. This use of the word possibly originates from the use of physical marks made to measure height or progress. Furthermore, by metonymy the word mark is used to note a defined level of development or a model number.

The kind of products that use this convention vary widely in complexity. The concept shares some similarities with the type designation (in hardware), also called software versioning: 1.0+ (1.1, 1.12, 2.0, 3.0, etc.), used to designate general software product releases, and other version control schemas. Thus designations like "Mark I", "Mark II", "Mark III", "Mark IV", etc. come to be used as proper names for persons and products.

== Application ==
Mark refers to a mark on the modification plate of a system, component or machine. Modification plates are used to identify which modifications have already been applied to the device, either at the factory or by maintainers. The use of Mark as a method of versioning has entered common usage however, and may be applied to devices without a modification plate to physically mark.

=== United Kingdom ===
In British military practice, Mark ("Mk") designations were given in Roman numerals (replaced by Arabic numerals in 1944) to reflect variants of or production changes to service weaponry, either on their own or as part of numerical ("No.") designations; in the Lee-Enfield rifle series for example, the SMLE rifles were produced to Mk I, Mk III, and Mk V specification (with the latter two later gaining a numerical designation of "No. 1 Mk III/Mk V Rifle"), while the No .4 rifles were produced to No. 4 Mk I and No. 4 Mk 2 specification. Variations or production changes could be further denoted with an asterisk as with the SMLE Mk III* (later "No. 1 Mk III*") and No. 4 Mk I*. The British Army switched to Land Service number designations ("LXA1/A2/A3/etc.") in 1954, but legacy items (Note: Including but not limited to the No. 4 Rifle, the various Sten machine carbines, the original .303 versions of the Bren gun, the No. 5 Mk 1 Bayonet, the No. 8 Mk 1 0.22in Rifle, the No. 36M Mk 1 HE Hand Grenade, the No. 80 Mk 1 White Phosphorus Smoke Hand Grenade, the No. 1 6 Inch Beehive Demolition Charge, the No. 14 Mk 1 11 lb Hayrick Demolition Charge, the No. 1 Mk 3 Pyrotechnic Pistol Signal Kit, and the No. 94 Anti-Tank Grenade.) continued to be referred to by their Mk designations until their replacement by newer equipment. To this day, there are stores using an Mk designation that are still in service such as the No. 1 Mk 4 Protective Suit.

British railway coaching stock has been referred to using Arabic numeral marks following the introduction of the British Railways Mark 1 in 1951, with further designs being referred to as the Mark 2 (introduced in 1964), the Mark 3 (introduced in 1975), and the Mark 4 (introduced in 1989). The Mark 5 designation was initially intended for coaches belonging to the 1990 InterCity 250 project, but this was cancelled in 1992; the designation was later applied to CAF-built coaches used on the Caledonian Sleeper service since 2019, replacing earlier Mark 2 and Mark 3 coaches, while coaches built by the same manufacturer for TransPennine Express are referred to as the Mark 5A.

=== United States Navy ===
The United States Navy uses the terms "Mark" and "Mod" as a method to uniquely designate specific types and configurations of equipment that would otherwise lack military designations. The practice was adopted by the Naval Ordnance group in 1944, and was formalized in the MIL-STD-1661 MARK and MOD Nomenclature System in 1978. As the system came from the Ordnance group, it is primarily used to describe naval guns, gun mounts, and other similar weapon systems.

== Examples ==
=== Military ===
- Mark I, the first British Army tank design to see service
- Mk 2 grenade (an American grenade used in World War II, Korean War and the Vietnam War)
- Mark III, Merkava main battle tank (Israel Defense Forces)
- Mark 4 aerial atomic bomb, several United States atomic gravity bombs employed a Mark-# scheme (USAF)
- A.T. Mine G.S. Mark V an anti-tank mine of the WWII British Army
- Mk 6 Assault Boat (British Army)
- Mark 7 nuclear bomb
- Tank, Cruiser, Mk VIII - eighth in series of British Army cruiser tanks
- Mk 11 Sniper Weapon System (US Armed Forces)
- Mark 12 Mod X Special Purpose Rifle (US Special Operations Forces)
- Mk 13 missile launcher (anti-ship/anti-aircraft) (US Navy)
- Mark 14 Mod 0 Enhanced Battle Rifle (US Armed Forces)
- Mk 16 SCAR-L and Mk 17 SCAR-H assault rifle and battle rifle commissioned by the US armed forces
- Mk 18 CQBR M4A1 Receiver upgrade (US Armed Forces)
- Mk 19 grenade launcher (US Armed Forces)
- Mark 48 torpedo as well as other torpedoes used by the British and US Navies

=== Vehicles ===
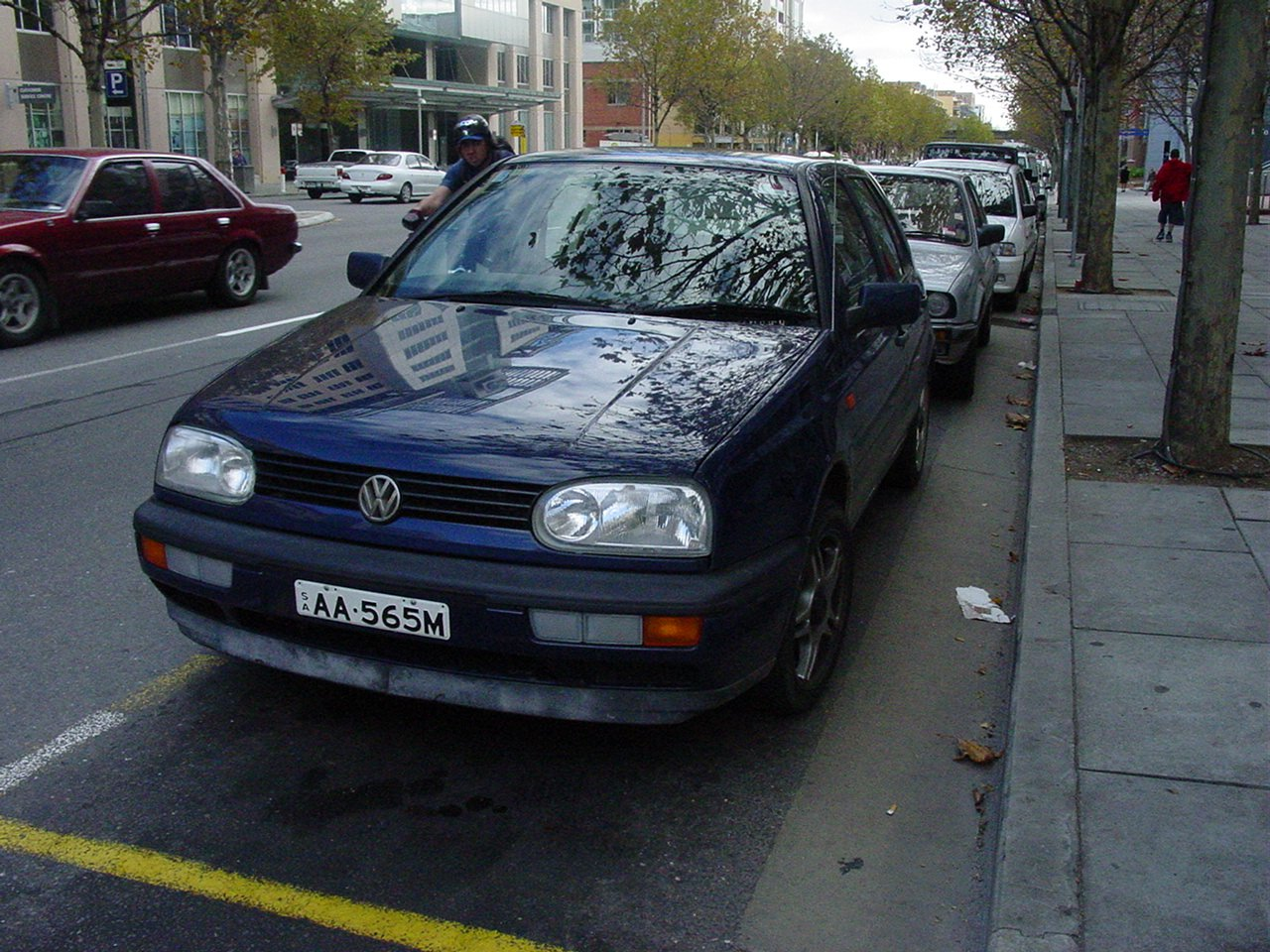
VW Golf Mk III

- The AC Cars Cobra — MkI, MkII and MkIII
- The Ford GT40 series — MkI, MkII, MkIII and MkIV
- Various Jaguar Cars — Jaguar Mark 2, Jaguar Mark IV, Jaguar Mark X, etc.
- The Lincoln Mark series - Continental Mark II, Lincoln Mark VIII, etc.
- Various Lola Cars - Mk.4, Mk.5, Mk.6
- Various Toyota vehicles, especially the MR2 — MkI, MkII, MkIII
- Volkswagen Golf automobile — Mk1, Mk2, Mk3, Mk4, Mk5, Mk6, Mk7, Mk8
- British Rail Coaches — Mark 1, Mark 4, etc.
- The Walt Disney World Monorails - Mark IV and Mark VI.

=== Musical and photo instruments ===
- Rhodes piano — Mark I, Mark II
- Mesa Boogie Mark Series — guitar amplifiers, Mark I to Mark V
- Telharmonium, an early electronic musical instrument, Mark I to III
- SELMER Saxophones — Mark VI and Mark VII Series of saxophones
- Elektron music machines — Mk II versions of the Monomachine synthesizer and the Machinedrum drum machine
- Canon EOS-1D series — 1Ds Mk II, 1D Mk III, 1Ds Mk III, etc.

=== Firearms ===
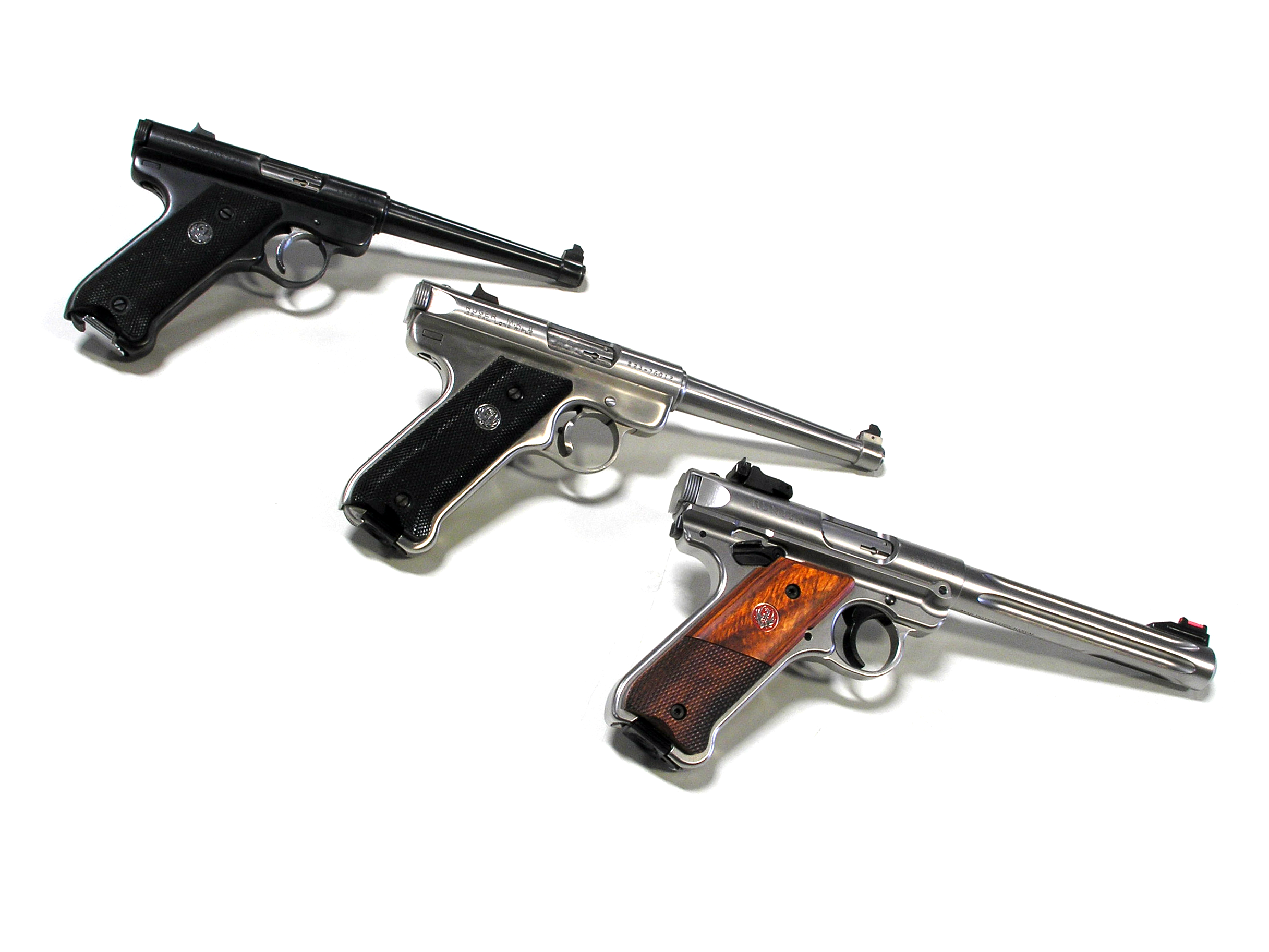
Ruger Mk I at top; Ruger Mk II; Ruger Mk IV Hunter. demonstrates the use of the designation as the name, often referred to simply as "the Mk II", "a Mk III", etc.

- Ruger Standard series (Ruger MK I, Ruger MK II, Ruger MK III)
- Weatherby Mark V

=== Electronics ===
- Harvard Mark I, Mark II, Mark III, and Mark IV, early computers designed by Howard Aiken at Harvard University from 1937 to 1952
- Navigation system on BMW cars - Mk I, Mk II, Mk III and Mk IV

=== Medical research ===
- The term SARS‑CoV‑2 for the novel Coronavirus may be considered part of this designating method. The term COVID-19 has been misinterpreted in this way on several occasions; the number here, however, denotes the year of the first appearance of the virus, 2019.

== See also ==
- British military aircraft designation systems
- Army Nomenclature System
- Mark I
- Mark II
- Mark III
- Mark IV
- Mark V
- Mark VI
- Mark VII
- Mark VIII
- Mark IX
- Mark X
- Mark XI
- Mark XII
- Mark XIII
- Mark XIV
- Mark XV
- Mark XVI
- Mark XVII
- Mark XVIII
- Mark XIX
- Model
- Type (designation)
