= Vickers .50 machine gun =

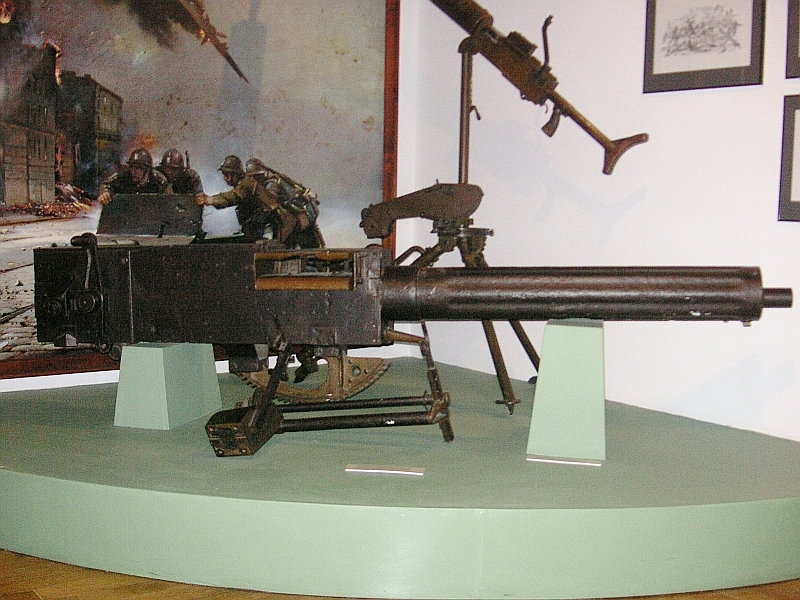
- A Vickers .50 machine gun, Polish Army Museum, Warsaw (2006)
- Type: Heavy machine gun Anti-aircraft gun
- Place of origin: United Kingdom

Service history
- In service: 1933–1954
- Used by: United Kingdom; Ireland
- Wars: World War II

Production history
- Manufacturer: Vickers; Enfield
- Produced: 1933–1938
- Variants: Marks I–V (Note: Britain used Roman numerals to denote marks (versions) of ordnance until after the Second World War.); See § Variants

Specifications (Vickers .5 Mk V)
- Mass: 63 lb (29 kg), excluding 10 lb (4.5 kg) cooling water
- Length: 52.4 in (1,330 mm)
- Barrel length: 31 in (790 mm)
- Cartridge: 12.7×81mmSR
- Calibre: 0.5 in (12.7 mm)
- Rate of fire: 500–600 rounds/min
- Muzzle velocity: 2,540 ft/s (770 m/s)
- Maximum firing range: Ground: 4,265 yd (3,900 m); Altitude: 9,500 ft (2,900 m)
- Feed system: Belt

The Vickers .5 inch machine gun (officially "Gun, Machine, Vickers, .5-in") also known as the Vickers .50 was a large-calibre British automatic weapon. The gun was commonly used as a close-in anti-aircraft weapon on Royal Navy and Allied ships, typically in a four-gun mounting (UK) or two-gun mounting (Dutch), as well as tanks and other armoured fighting vehicles. It was similar to the .303 in (7.7 mm) Vickers machine gun but fired the enlarged calibre British Vickers 0.5-inch (12.7 mm) ammunition; this round was shorter in length than the American .50 BMG (12.7×99mm).

== Variants ==
=== Mark I and Mark II ===
The Mark I was the initial model but the gun went through further development before entering production and the first Mark to be taken into service was the Mark II. The Mark II entered service in 1933 and was mounted in some British light tanks, often paired with a 0.303 Vickers. The Mark II had a pistol grip rather than the spade grips of the infantry 0.303 machine gun.

=== Mark III ===
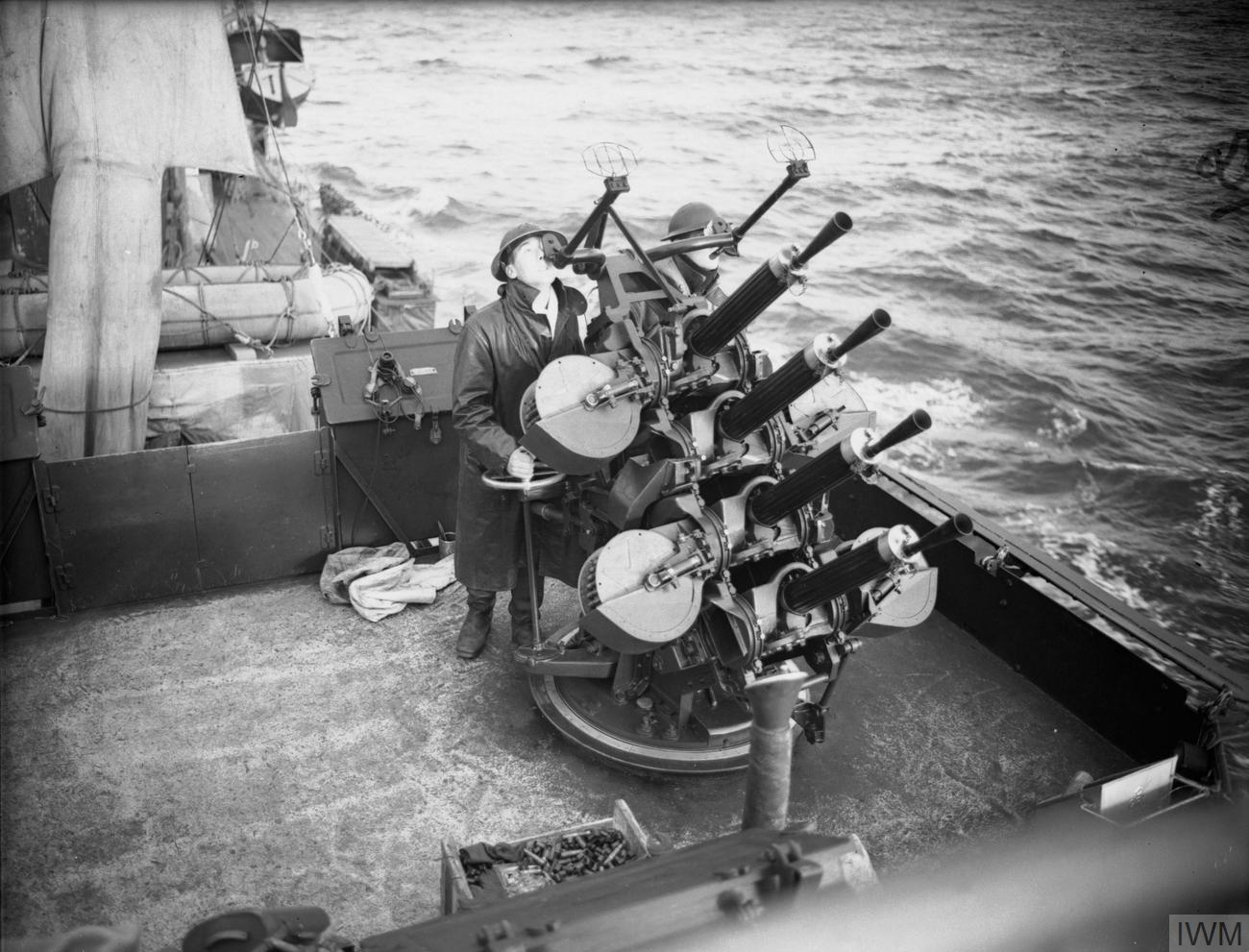
A four-gun, naval anti-aircraft mounting, on board the destroyer HMS Vanity (1940)

The Mark III was a naval version used as an anti-aircraft weapon, mostly by the Royal Navy and allied navies in the Second World War, typically in mountings of four guns but also as single and dual mounts. It proved insufficiently powerful at short-range against modern all-metal aircraft and was superseded during the Second World War by the Oerlikon 20 mm cannon. The naval quad mount featured a 200-round magazine per barrel, which wrapped the ammunition belt around the magazine drum. Maximum rate of fire was 700 rounds per minute, per gun (cyclic) but could be reduced to 450. The four-barrel mounting had its guns adjusted to provide a spread of fire, amounting to 60 ft (18 m) wide and 50 ft (15 m) high at 1,000 yd (910 m). Vickers claimed that it could fire all 800 rounds in 20 seconds and could then be reloaded in a further 30 seconds. During the Second World War it was also mounted on power-operated turrets (usually a twin-gun mount) in smaller craft such as motor gunboats and motor torpedo boats.

=== Mark IV and V ===
Marks IV and V were improved versions and were also used on trucks in the North Africa Campaign such as by Long Range Desert Group It was superseded for use in British-built armoured fighting vehicles during the Second World War by the 15 mm (0.59 in) Besa machine gun, a Czech design adopted by the British for the Royal Armoured Corps.

The Mark IV was introduced in 1933 but not declared obsolete until 1944. It had full auto only at 600 rounds per minute.

The Mark V, introduced in 1935, was a strengthened variant and the main variant to be used. Fire rate was 500-600 rounds per minute.

== See also ==
- M2 Browning
- Pom-pom

== Bibliography ==
- The Vickers Machine Gun
- Tony DiGiulian, British 0.50"/62 (12.7 mm) Mark III
- Williams, Anthony G (November 2012). "The .5" Vickers Guns and Ammunition". Archived from the original on 29 January 2022.
