= Mark VIII =

Mark VIII or Mark 8 often refers to the eighth version of a product, frequently military hardware. "Mark", meaning "model" or "variant", can be abbreviated "Mk."

Mark VIII or Mark 8 may refer to:

== Military and weaponry ==
- Mark 8 torpedo (1911); American 21-inch torpedo designed by Bliss-Leavitt.
- 18 inch Mark VIII torpedo; a British 18-inch wet-heater torpedo that began service in 1913
- Tank Mark VIII, also known as the "Liberty" or "International tank"; an Anglo-American tank design of the late World War I
- BL 8 inch Howitzer Mk 8 (1916); British 8-inch artillery piece used in World War I and early World War II
- 21-inch Mark VIII torpedo; a common British 21-inch torpedo that began service in 1927, saw extensive use in World War II and was used as late as 1982 to sink the ARA General Belgrano
- QF 2-pounder Mark VIII (1930–1940s), also known as the "pom-pom"; a quick-firing British naval anti-aircraft gun
- Japanese naval aerial bomb color code Mark 8; a green-brown-grey color code denoting an anti-shipping skip bomb
- Tank, Cruiser, Mk VIII, Cromwell (A27M) (1943), also known as the Cromwell tank; the most numerous British cruiser tank in World War II
  - Cruiser Mk VIII Challenger; a Cromwell tank derivative carrying a heavier gun
- Light Tank Mk VIII (1943), also known as the "Harry Hopkins", a British light tank
- Handley Page Halifax C Mk VIII (1944); unarmed cargo and passenger plane variant on the British bomber design
- Supermarine Spitfire Mk VIII; 1944 British fighter aircraft in overseas service, the third-most numerous Spitfire variant
- Mark 8 nuclear bomb (1952–1957); an American nuclear bomb
- Mark 8 Landing Craft Tank, a landing craft operated by the British military from the end of World War II to the 1970s

== Vehicles ==
- Jaguar Mark VIII (1956–1958), a British sports sedan
- Lincoln Continental Mark VIII (1993–1998), an American personal luxury car
- Cooper Mk.VIII, a single seater racing car

== Technologies ==
- Sumlock ANITA Mk VIII calculator (1961); a British desktop calculator with Nixie-type tube display
- Mark-8 (1974); an early 8-bit minicomputer kit based on the Intel 8008 CPU

== Other uses ==
- Mark 8 or Mark VIII, the eighth chapter of the Gospel of Mark in the New Testament of the Christian Bible
- Pope Mark VIII of Alexandria, Coptic Pope in 1796–1809
