= T31 =

T31 or T.31 may refer to:

- Aero Country Airport, in McKinney, Texas; FAA airport code T31
- General Electric T31, an American turboprop engine
- German torpedo boat T31
- Komagawa-Nakano Station, Higashisumiyoshi-ku, Osaka, Japan; Osaka Metro station code T31
- Slingsby T.31 Tandem Tutor, a British military training glider
- T31 cannon, an aircraft weapon
- Type 31 frigate, a planned class of frigates for the Royal Navy
- Cooper T31, a British Formula Three racing car: see Cooper Mk.VIII
