= T32 =

T32 or T-32 may refer to:

== Aviation ==
- Convair T-32, an American military transport
- Curtiss T-32 Condor II, an American biplane airliner and bomber
- General Aviation Design Bureau T-32 Maverick, a Ukrainian ultralight aircraft
- Pratt & Whitney T32, an aircraft engine project

== Other uses ==
- T32 (classification), a disability sport classification
- Gordini T32, a French racing car
- German torpedo boat T32
- Hirano Station (Osaka Metro), Japan
- London buses route T32
- T-32 (Š-I-D), a Czechoslovak-designed Yugoslav tankette
- T32 Heavy Tank, an American tank
- Cooper T32, a British single seater racing car: see Cooper Mk.VIII
