= Mark XV =

Mark XV or Mark 15 often refers to the 15th version of a product, frequently military hardware. "Mark", meaning "model" or "variant", can be abbreviated "Mk."

Mark XV or Mark 15 may refer to:

== Technology ==
- Mark 15 torpedo, 1930 US Navy weapon plagued with development problems in World War II
- Supermarine Spitfire XV; a designation reserved for use with the Supermarine Seafire
- Mark 15 nuclear bomb; 1950s American thermonuclear bomb
- Mark 15 Phalanx CIWS; automated anti-missile gatling gun, entered US Navy service in 1980
- Mark 15, a variant of the 8-inch/55-caliber gun
- MK 15, the US military designation for the McMillan TAC-50
- Mark 15, British military term for an improvised mortar used by the Provisional IRA known as the Barrack buster

== Other uses ==
- Mark 15 and Mark XV, the fifteenth chapter of the Gospel of Mark in the New Testament of the Christian Bible
- International Watch Company Mark XV; pilot watch produced from 1999 to 2006
