= Mark XVIII =

Mark XVIII or Mark 18 often refers to the 18th version of a product, frequently military hardware. "Mark", meaning "model" or "variant", can be abbreviated "Mk."

Mark XVIII or Mark 18 may refer to:

== Technology ==
- De Havilland Mosquito NF Mk XVIII; a Royal Air Force night fighter radar modification
- De Havilland Mosquito FB Mk XVIII, also called Tsetse; RAF ground-attack aircraft carrying a QF 6-pounder (57 mm) anti-tank gun
- Supermarine Spitfire Mk 18; a further development of the Mk XIV, arriving too late to serve in World War II
- Mark 18 torpedo, 1944 US Navy electric torpedo
- Mark 18 nuclear bomb; 1953 American nuclear bomb
- CQBR Mark 18 Mod 0; a modification of the M4 Carbine
- Mk 18 Mod 0 grenade launcher; former US Navy grenade launcher

== Other uses ==
- Bolo Gladius model XVIII, artificially intelligent tank imagined by author Keith Laumer
