= 12.7×81mmSR =

12.7 X 81mm Semi-Rimmed, Breda / Vickers .5"V/565

12.7×81mm
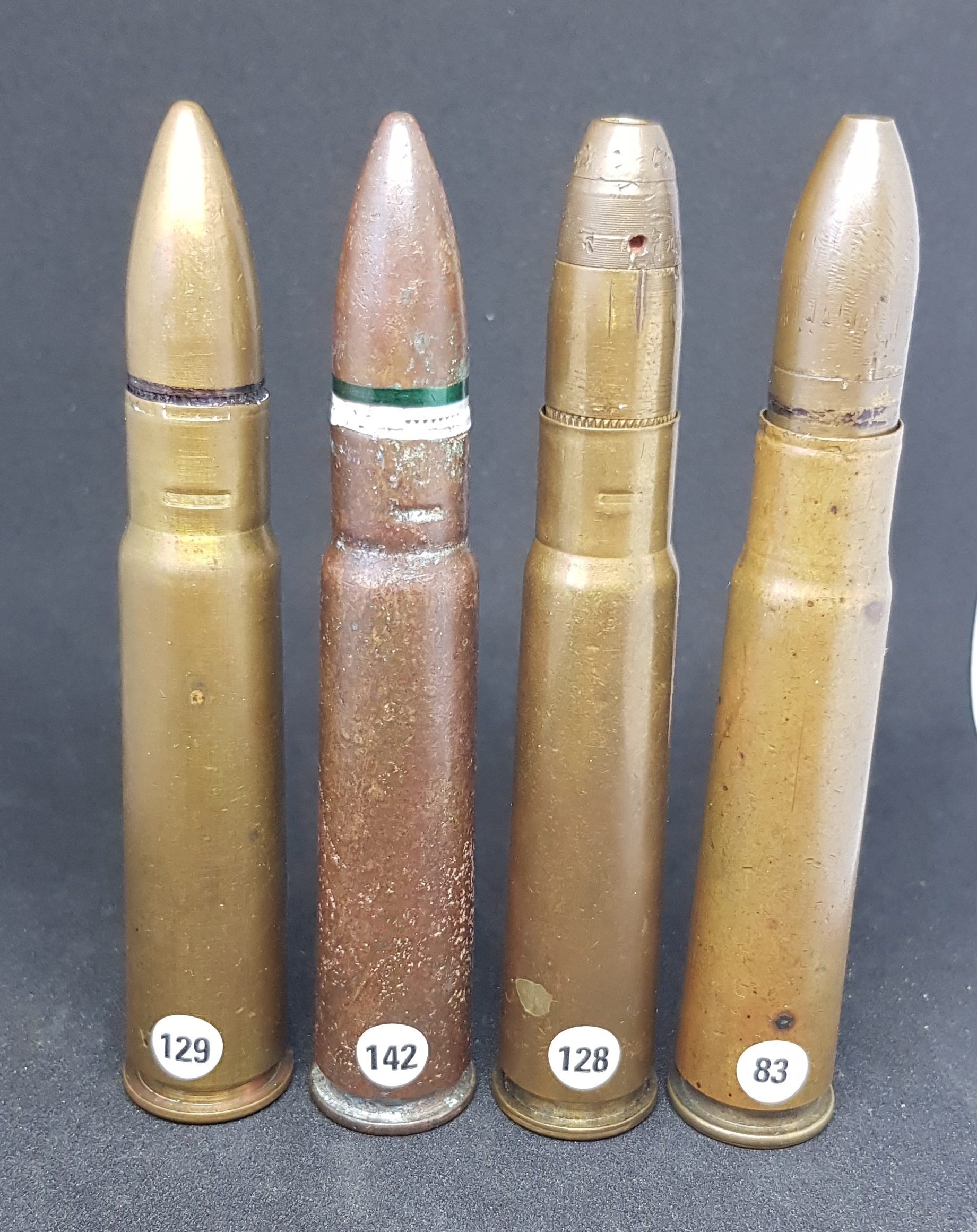
- Japanese-made 12.7x81mmSR cartridges: from left to right: AP-T (red tracer), AP-T (white tracer), Ma 103 HEI (high-explosive, incendiary), Ma 102 HEI.
- Type: Heavy Machine Gun
- Place of origin: UK

Production history
- Designed: 1923

Specifications
- Parent case: Vickers .5V/580
- Case type: Semi-rimmed, bottlenecked
- Bullet diameter: 13.05 mm (0.514 in)
- Neck diameter: 13.80 mm (0.543 in)
- Base diameter: 18.32 mm (0.721 in)
- Rim diameter: 19.55 mm (0.770 in)
- Case length: 81.2 mm (3.20 in)
- Overall length: 107.2 mm (4.22 in)
- Primer type: Berdan

Ballistic performance
Bullet mass/type	Velocity	Energy
36.6 g (565 gr)	2510 fps	7,902 J (5,828 ft⋅lbf)

The 12.7×81mmSR cartridge was created by Vickers as an export variant of the cartridge developed for the Vickers .50 machine gun. The major changes were to modify the case from rimless to Semi-Rimmed and reduce the bullet weight from 580 gr (38 g) to 565 gr (36.6 g).

== History ==
Vickers sold a number of weapons chambered in the cartridge to Italy and Japan, who developed their own weapons that utilized that cartridge.

The cartridge was adopted by Italy in 1933 with the Breda-SAFAT and Scotti–Isotta Fraschini Modello 1933 machine guns, which armed most of the aircraft of the Regia Aeronautica from the Ethiopian War to the Second World War. The cartridge remained in production until the 1970s, when the last Breda-SAFAT machine guns, that were in service until the 1970s as reserve weapons of the Italian Air Force, were decommissioned.

As aircraft of the Corpo Truppe Volontarie and the Fiat CR.32 fighters supplied to the Nationalists during the Spanish Civil War were armed with the Breda-SAFAT, the cartridge was produced in Spain by "Pirotécnica" of Seville.

Hungary also produced the Reggiane Re.2000 under license which was armed with the Gebauer 1940.M GKM machine gun, which used the cartridge.

In 1941 Type 1 machine gun variants (Ho-103 in fixed mounts and Ho-104 in flexible mounts) were introduced by Japan as aircraft-mounted heavy machine guns using the cartridge.

== Alternate names ==
- 12.7mm Breda
- 12.7 x 81 SR
- 12.7mm Type 1
- 12.7mm Mod. 36
- 12.7mm Japanese
- .5 in. V/565 Vickers-Armstrong

== Cartridge variants ==
- Ball (full metal jacket), marked with a pink or red seal around the casemouth.
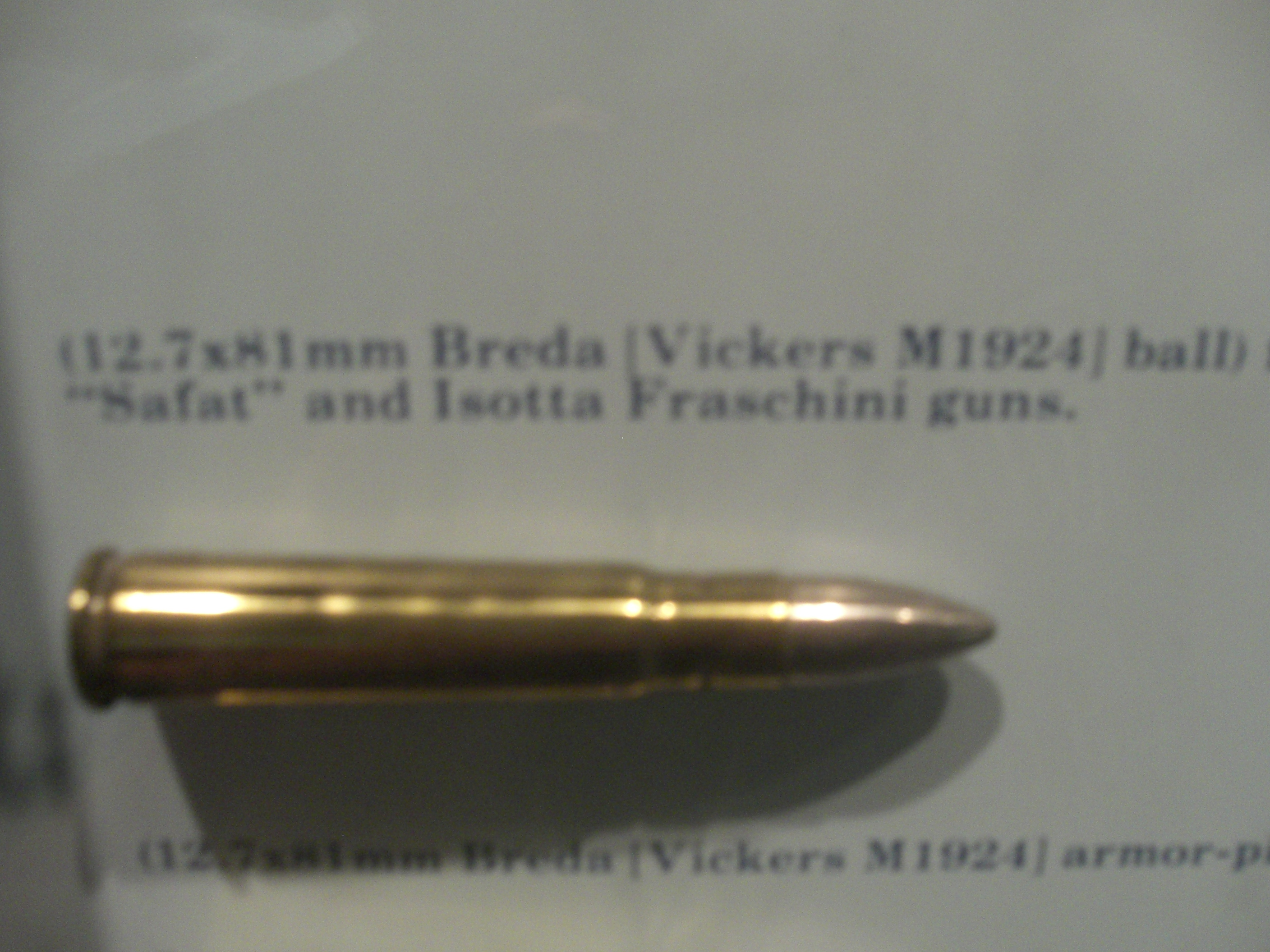
  12.7 × 81 mm ball
- Armor piercing (AP) of Italian origin, marked with a black tip.
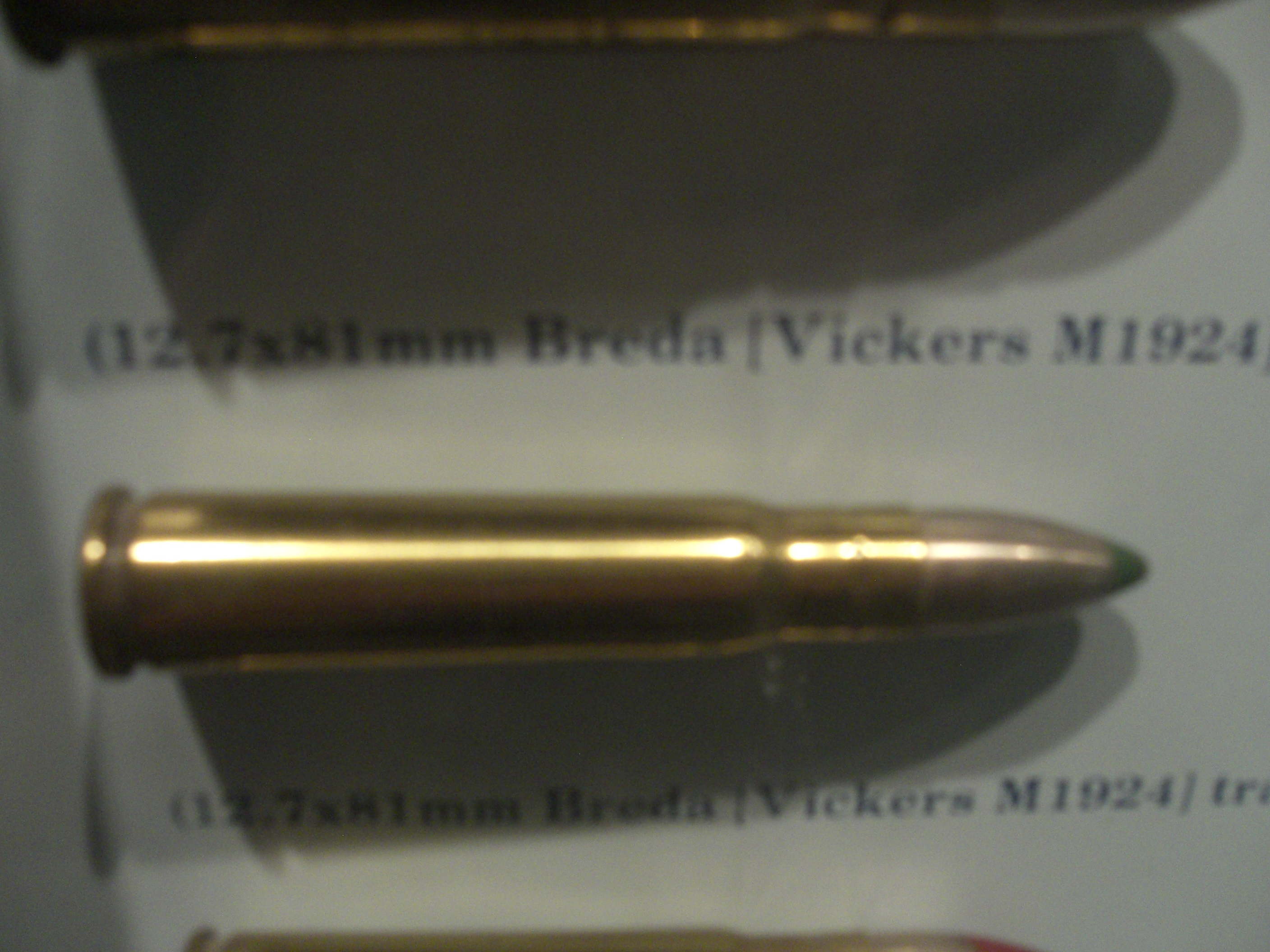
  12.7×81mmSR AP
- Armour piercing tracer (AP-T) with red tracer, marked with a pink tip and green and white seal around the casemouth.
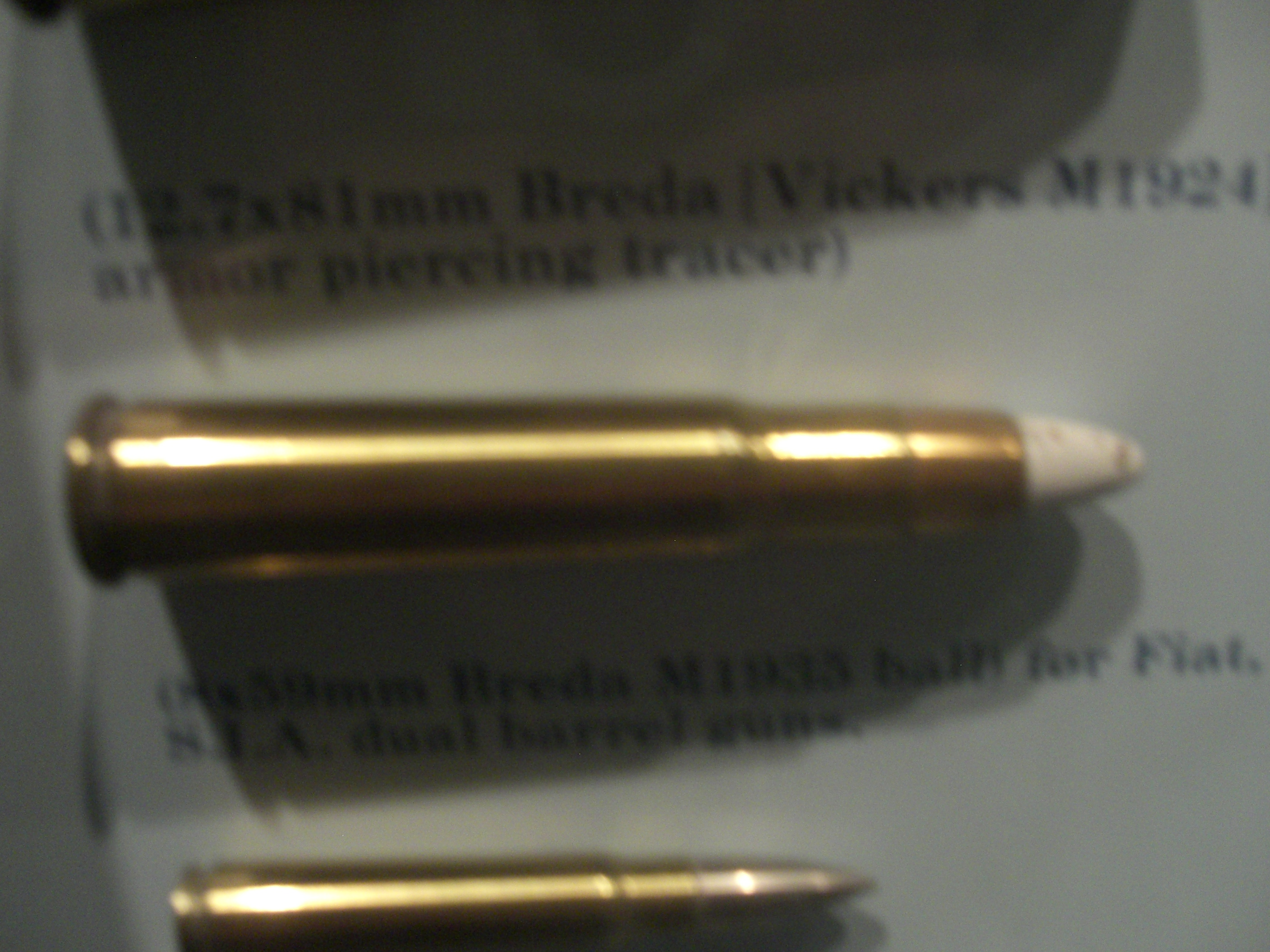
  12.7 × 81 mm HE, AP, tracer
- AP-T with brighter-burning, longer-lasting red tracer, uncolored tip and black seal around the casemouth.
- AP-T with white tracer, uncolored tip and green and white seal around the casemouth.
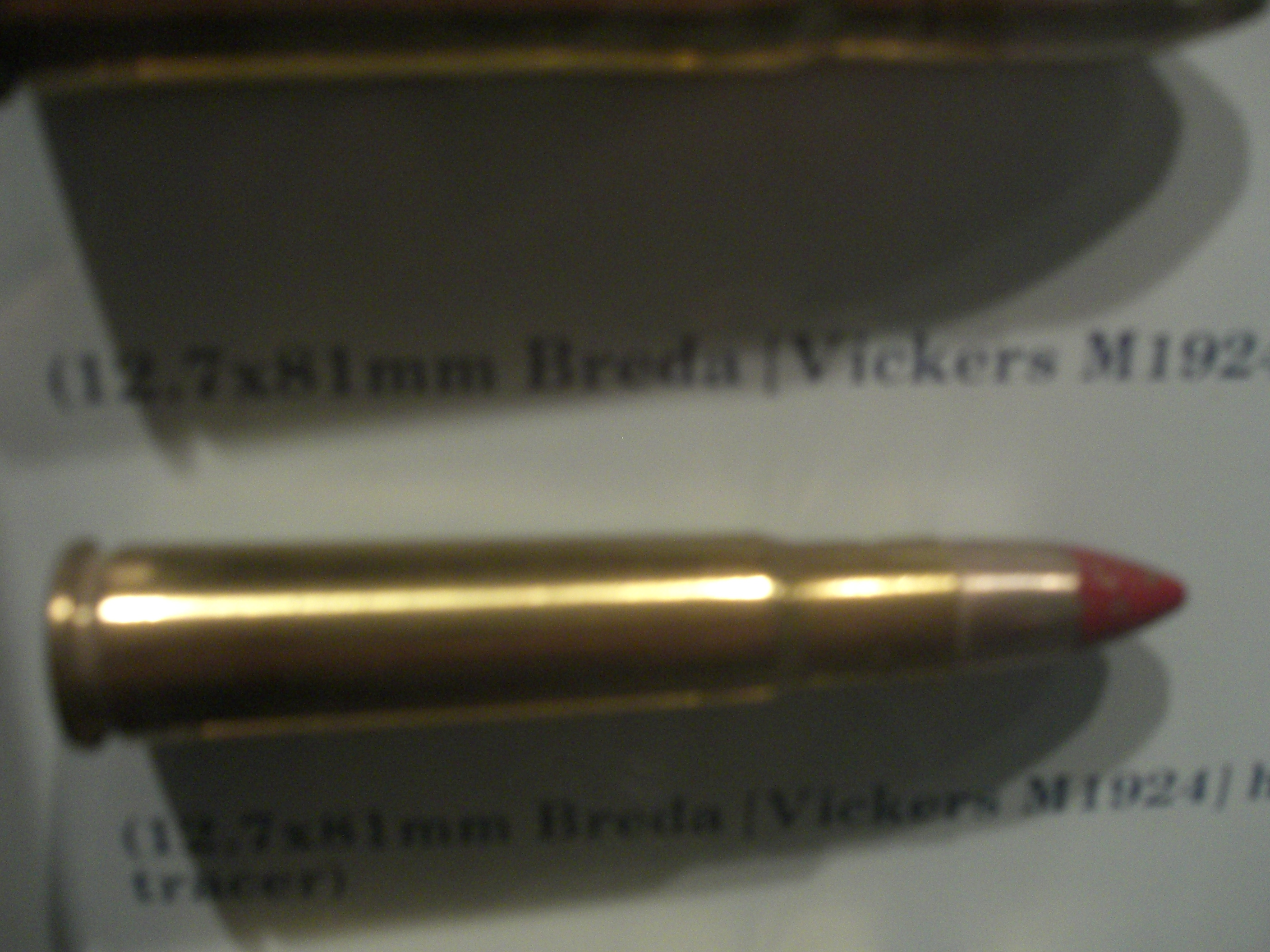
  12.7 × 81 mm tracer
- Fuzed high-explosive incendiary (HEI) of Italian origin, its body painted blue or red. Contained 0.8 grams (12 gr) of PETN and incendiary composition.
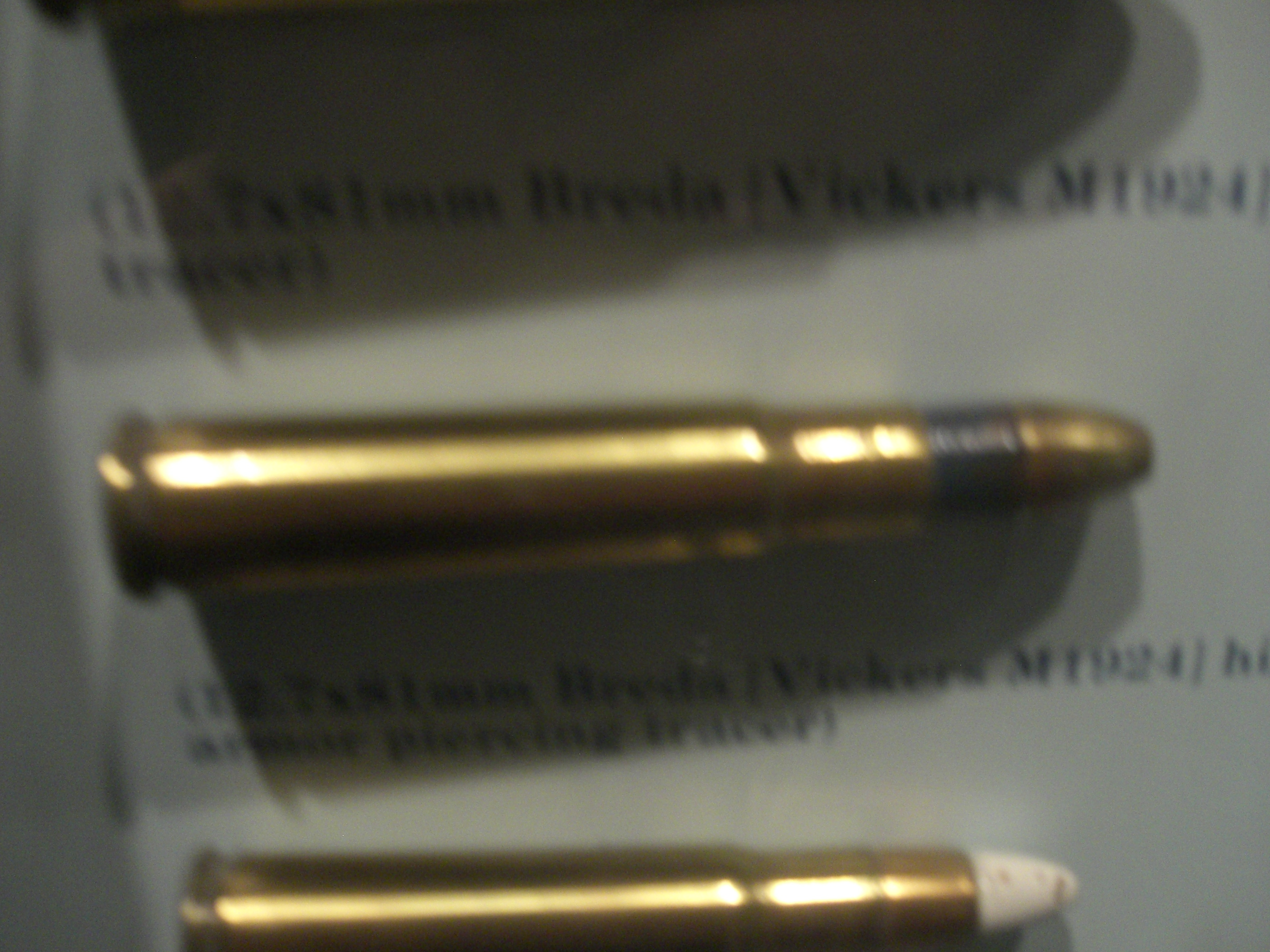
  12.7 × 81 mm HE, tracer
- Ma 103 fuzed HEI, marked with a white seal around the casemouth. Contained 0.8 grams (12 gr) of RDX and 1.46 grams (22.5 gr) incendiary composition.
- Ma 102 fuzeless HEI, marked with a dark purple seal around the casemouth. Contained 2 grams (31 gr) of PETN + RDX and 1.46 grams (22.5 gr) incendiary composition.

== See also ==
- 12 mm caliber
- .50 BMG
- Breda-SAFAT machine gun
- Ho-103 machine gun
