= Mark XIX =

Mark XIX or Mark 19 may refer to:

== Military ==
- Mk 19 grenade launcher, a widely used American belt-fed weapon that fires 40 mm grenades
- Mark 19 torpedo, a prototype American torpedo
- Desert Eagle or Mark XIX (1982), a U.S.-Israeli large caliber semi-automatic pistol
- Logistics Vehicle System MK19 Rear Body Unit; US Marine Corps heavy tactical vehicle trailer incorporating a crane

=== United Kingdom ===
- BL 6-inch gun Mk XIX (1916–1940), an artillery piece made by Vickers
- CP Mk.XIX, a Royal Navy central-pivot twin-mount carrying two quick-firing 4-inch guns
- HA/LA Mk.XIX, a Royal Navy high-angle/low-angle twin-mount carrying two quick-firing 4-inch guns
- De Havilland Mosquito NF Mk XIX, a night fighter variant De Havilland Mosquito that could mount American or British radar
- Supermarine Spitfire Mk 19 (1944), the last and most successful Supermarine Spitfire photographic reconnaissance variant
- Vickers Wellington T Mk XIX, service conversion of the Vickers Wellington Mk X for use as a navigation trainer
- ASV Mk. 19 (anti surface vessel), an EKCO airborne radar fitted to the Royal Navy Fairey Gannet
