= Mark XVI =

Mark XVI or Mark 16 often refers to the 16th version of a product, frequently military hardware. "Mark", meaning "model" or "variant", can be abbreviated "Mk."

Mark XVI or Mark 16 may refer to:

== Technology ==
- De Havilland Mosquito B Mk XVI, the most numerous Mosquito bomber variant with 1,200 built
- De Havilland Mosquito PR Mk XVI, a photo-reconnaissance variant
- Vickers Wellington C Mk XVI, a service conversion into an unarmed transport aircraft
- Supermarine Spitfire Mk XVI (1943); identical to Spitfire Mk IX but with a licence-built Packard Merlin engine
- Supermarine Spitfire F Mk 16; high speed Griffon-powered conversion of the Spitfire Mk XIV — two built
- Bristol Hercules Mk XVI, a British 14-cylinder, 1675 hp radial aircraft engine
- Bristol Taurus Mk XVI, a British 14-cylinder, 1130 hp radial aircraft engine
- Mark 16 6-inch/47-caliber gun, US naval gun in triple mount configuration, used on light cruisers
- Mark 16 torpedo (1945), common US Navy submarine anti-shipping torpedo in service until the mid-1970s
- 5"/54 caliber Mark 16 gun (1945), an American deck gun used by Japanese and US naval forces in the 1950s
- Mark 16 nuclear bomb (1954); a large, experimental American weapon design that used cryogenic liquid deuterium as fusion fuel
- QF 4 in (102 mm L/45) Mark XVI, a British naval quick-firing gun
- CP Mk.XVI, a mounting for the BL 6 in L/45 Mark XII naval gun
- Mark XVI, a British moored naval contact mine for laying in 100 fathoms or less
- Colt Mk16 Mod 4 automatic cannon, derived from the Hispano-Suiza HS.404 for boats of the Mobile Riverine Force in Vietnam
- Mk-16, a launcher for the naval RGM-84 Boeing Harpoon missile
- FN SCAR-L, Mk 16 Mod 0, a 5.56mm assault rifle used by US Special Operations

== Other uses ==
- Mark 16 or Mark XVI, the 16th and final chapter of the Gospel of Mark in the New Testament of the Christian Bible
- International Watch Company (IWC) Mark XVI, an automatic Pilot's watch introduced in 2006.
