= Mark XI =

Mark XI or Mark 11 often refers to the 11th version of a product, frequently military hardware. "Mark", meaning "model" or "variant", can be abbreviated "Mk."

Mark XI or Mark 11 may refer to:

== Military ==
- Mark 11 torpedo (1926), American surface combatant torpedo
- Mark XI torpedo (1934), British aircraft-delivered torpedo
- Hedgehog Mark 11, variant of the Hedgehog, a British anti-submarine spigot mortar weapon
- Supermarine Spitfire Mk XI (1942-1944), variant of the Supermarine Spitfire, a British photo reconnaissance aircraft
- Bristol Beaufighter Mk XIC, variant of the Bristol Beaufighter, a British Coastal Command long range heavy fighter
- Mark 11 missile launcher, a naval based missile launcher
- Mark 11 nuclear bomb (1956-1960), an American nuclear bomb
- United States Navy Mk 11 Mod 0 Sniper Weapon System, based on the SR-25

== Other uses ==
- Mark 11 or Mark XI, the eleventh chapter of the Gospel of Mark in the New Testament of the Christian Bible
- Mortal Kombat 11, a 2019 fighting video game
