= Mark VII =

Mark VII or Mark 7 often refers to the seventh version of a product, frequently military hardware. "Mark", meaning "model" or "variant", can be abbreviated "Mk."

Mark VII or Mark 7 may refer to:

== Technology ==
- BL 6 inch Mk VII naval gun (1899), British naval gun that also served as an Army field gun
- BL 8 inch Howitzer Mk 6 - 8, a Vickers gun from World War I; the Mk VII was introduced in 1916
- Mark VII tank, a British tank design from World War I
- BL 14 inch / 45 mk VII naval gun, Royal Navy gun from the 1930s
- .303 round Mk VII (1910): standard British Empire rifle and machine-gun cartridge in World Wars I and II.
- Tank, Light Mk VII also known as the Tetrarch tank; British light tank designed in 1938
- 16"/50 caliber Mark 7 gun, an American naval gun used aboard Iowa-class battleships
- Supermarine Spitfire Mk VII; high altitude Royal Air Force fighter variant with pressurised cabin
- Mark 7 nuclear bomb (1951–1955); an American nuclear bomb
- Mk 7 helmet

=== Other vehicles ===
- Jaguar Mark VII (1951–1956), a large four-door British sports sedan
- Continental Mark VII (1984–1985) and Lincoln Mark VII (1986–1992), an American personal luxury car

== Other uses ==
- Mark 7 or Mark VII, the seventh chapter of the Gospel of Mark in the New Testament of the Christian Bible
- Pope Mark VII of Alexandria, Coptic Pope in 1745–1769
- Mark VII Limited, a production company of actor, producer, and director Jack Webb
