= Mark XII =

Mark XII or Mark 12 often refers to the twelfth version of a product, frequently military hardware. "Mark", meaning "model" or "variant", can be abbreviated "Mk."

Mark XII or Mark 12 may refer to:

== In technology ==
=== In military and weaponry ===
- BL 6 inch Mk XII naval gun, a British naval gun
- MK-3-12 (1907), a Russian naval main weapon that used three 12-inch guns in a single mounting
- Mark 12 torpedo (1930), an American 21-inch torpedo
- 5"/38 caliber gun or Mark 12 5"/38 (1934), a widely used American 5-inch naval gun
- 18 inch Mark XII torpedo (1935), a British 18 inch torpedo
- Supermarine Spitfire Mk XII (1942–1944); the first Griffon-engined Spitfire variant
- Hawker Hurricane Mk XII (1942), a Canadian-built Hurricane variant
- Gloster Meteor Mk XII, a British night fighter variant with American radar
- 21-inch Mark 12 (1952), a British torpedo
- Mark 12 nuclear bomb (1954–1962), an American nuclear bomb
- Colt Mk 12 cannon, a US Navy aircraft gun used in the 1950s and 1960s
- Mk 12 Special Purpose Rifle (2002), a weapon system in use by United States Special Operations Forces

=== Other technology ===
- Sumlock ANITA calculator Mk 12 (1966), a Sumlock ANITA desktop model

== Other uses ==
- Mark 12 or Mark XII, the twelfth chapter of the Gospel of Mark in the New Testament of the Christian Bible
- Vox Mark XII, a 12-string variant of the Vox Mark electric guitar made in the 1960s
- MK12, a graphic design company
