= Mark XIII =

Mark XIII or Mark 13 often refers to the 13th version of a product, frequently military hardware. "Mark", meaning "model" or "variant", can be abbreviated "Mk."

Mark XIII or Mark 13 may refer to:

== Science ==
- EGF-binding protein type B, also called mouse Kallikrein 13 (mK13), an enzyme found in mice

== Military and weaponry ==
- Mark 13 torpedo, US Navy's most common air-dropped torpedo in World War II
- Mk XIII railway gun, a variant of the British BL 9.2-inch railway gun
- Supermarine Spitfire PR Mk XIII, lightly armed low-altitude Rolls-Royce Merlin-powered reconnaissance aircraft, first tested March 1943
- Vickers Wellington GR Mk XIII, 1944 Coastal Command medium bomber with ordinary nose turret, mast radar and no waist guns
- De Havilland Mosquito NF Mk XIII, a night fighter variant of the De Havilland Mosquito that replaced nose guns with radar
- Mark 13 nuclear bomb (1951–1954), an American experimental weapon that never entered service
- Centurion Mk 13 (1959–1962), a British main battle tank fitted with infrared equipment and a ranging gun
- Mk 13 missile launcher, a single-arm guided missile launching system
- Mk 13 Mod 0 or EGLM (2004), a 40 mm grenade launcher
- MK 13 rifle, a US Military sniper rifle
- MK13-class missile boat, a vessel of the Iranian Islamic Revolutionary Guard Corps Navy

== Technology ==
- Cooper Mk XIII (1959), a Cooper 500 cc rear-engined racing car

== Other uses ==
- Mark 13 and Mark XIII, the thirteenth chapter of the Gospel of Mark in the New Testament of the Christian Bible
- M.A.R.K. 13, the fictional killer robot in the 1990 film Hardware
