= Mark IX =

Mark IX or Mark 9 often refers to the ninth version of a product, frequently military hardware. "Mark", meaning "model" or "variant", can be abbreviated "Mk."

Mark IX or Mark 9 may refer to:

== Technology ==
=== Military and weaponry ===
- BL 9.2 inch gun Mk IX–X (1899), a British 9.2 inch coastal defence cannon
- Armstrong Whitworth 12-inch 40-calibre naval gun Mark IX (1901), a British naval gun that was later used on land in the BL 12 inch Railway Gun
- 21in Mk IX torpedo, a British 21-inch torpedo
- Bliss-Leavitt Mark 9 torpedo (1915), an American 21-inch torpedo
- Mark IX tank, a World War I troop-carrying tank—the first armoured personnel carrier
- Ordnance QF 2 pounder (1936–1945), British mounted gun used in World War II
- Supermarine Spitfire Mk IX, the second most numerous Spitfire variant
- Floro MK-9 (2001), a submachine gun designed and built in the Philippines
- W9 (nuclear warhead), 11-inch (280 mm) nuclear artillery shell

=== Vehicles ===
- Jaguar Mark IX (1959–1961), a British luxury car
- Lincoln MK9 (2001), an American concept car
- Cooper Mark IX, a Formula Three racing car

== Other uses ==
- Mark 9 or Mark IX, the ninth chapter of the Gospel of Mark in the New Testament of the Christian Bible
- Mark IX Hawk, a fictional spacecraft in the Space 1999 TV series
