= Mark XIV =

Mark XIV or Mark 14, often abbreviated "Mk.", may refer to the 14th version of a product, frequently military hardware.

Mark XIV or Mark 14 may refer to:

== Military and weaponry ==
- Mark XIV bomb sight, developed by the 1942 Royal Air Force
- Mark 14 nuclear bomb, an American experimental thermonuclear weapon
- Mark 14 torpedo, a 1930 US Navy weapon plagued with development problems in World War II
- Mk 14 Enhanced Battle Rifle, an American military selective fire battle rifle
- Mk XIV (type 379), a Supermarine Spitfire variant
- Type 467 Wellington GR Mark XIV, a Vickers Wellington variant
- Martin-Baker Mk 14 NACES ejection seat

== Other uses ==
- Mark 14 and Mark XIV, the fourteenth chapter of the Gospel of Mark in the New Testament of the Christian Bible
- MK14, a 1977 microcomputer kit sold by Science of Cambridge
