= Mark VI =

Mark VI or Mark 6 often refers to the sixth version of a product, frequently military hardware. "Mark", meaning "model" or "variant", can be abbreviated "Mk."

Mark VI or Mark 6 may refer to:

== In technology ==
=== In military and weaponry ===
- Mark VI (tank), a British tank design from World War I
- Vickers Mk.VI light tank, a British tank design from the first years of World War II
- 16"/45 caliber Mark 6 gun, World War II-era U.S. Navy gun used as main armament on six fast battleships
- Supermarine Spitfire Mk VI, high altitude Royal Air Force fighter with five-blade propeller
- Mark 6 nuclear bomb (1951–1955), an American nuclear bomb
- Mk 6 helmet (1987), British Army standard kevlar helmet
- Mark VI, a fixed blade model from Chris Reeve Knives
- Webley Mark VI, a British Service revolver
- Mark VI patrol boat, an American patrol craft

=== Other vehicles ===
- Bentley Mark VI (1946–1952), a British luxury car made by Bentley
- Lincoln Continental Mark VI (1980–1983), American luxury car made by Ford Motor Company
- Mark VI monorail, used since 1989 at Walt Disney World in Orlando, Florida and later in Las Vegas, Nevada

== People ==
- Patriarch Mark VI of Alexandria, served from 1459 to 1484
- Pope Mark VI of Alexandria (died 1656), Coptic Pope from 1645 to 1660

== Other uses ==
- Mark 6 or Mark VI, the sixth chapter of the Gospel of Mark in the New Testament of the Christian Bible
- Mark Six, a lottery game
- Vox Mark VI, a 1962 teardrop shaped electric guitar
- Selmer Mark VI, high quality saxophone line made by Selmer beginning in the mid-1950s
- Mark VI class of industrial control systems used by General Electric
- Halo 3, mechanical armor variant is known as Mark VI
