= Mark IV =

Mark IV or Mark 4 often refers to the fourth version of a product, frequently military hardware. "Mark", meaning "model" or "variant", can be abbreviated "Mk."

Mark IV or Mark 4 may refer to:

== Computers ==
- MARK IV (software), a 1960s-era 4th-generation programming language from Informatics
- Harvard Mark IV (1952), an all-electronic stored-program computer
- ETL Mark IV computer, a transistorized computer built at the ElectroTechnical Laboratory in Japan
- Emergency Medical Hologram Mark IV, in Star Trek: Voyager, an artificially intelligent medical program

== Music ==
- The Mark IV, American vocal group, 1950s
- The Mark Four (1966–1968), an English band
- MARK IV (Barbershop), a barbershop quartet that won the 1969 SPEBSQSA competition
- Mesa Boogie Mark IV (1993–2008), an electric guitar amplifier
- Disklavier § Mark IV, a reproducing piano sold by Yamaha Corporation
- Mark IV line-up of rock band Deep Purple, their fourth line-up, with David Coverdale, Tommy Bolin, Jon Lord, Glenn Hughes and Ian Paice

== Religion ==
- Mark 4 or Mark IV, the fourth chapter of the Gospel of Mark in the New Testament of the Bible
- Patriarch Mark IV of Alexandria, Greek patriarch of Alexandria in 1385–1389
- Pope Mark IV of Alexandria (died 1363), Coptic Pope in 1348–1363

== Vehicles ==
- Mark 4 (Iarnród Éireann), Irish Rail InterCity train
- Mark IV monorail, train used at Walt Disney World, 1971–1989
- Mark IV tank, an up-armoured variant of the British Mark I tank, 1917
- Bristol Blenheim Mk.IV, light bomber in Royal Air Force service before and during World War II
- British Rail Mark 4, passenger train
- Chandelle Mk IV, ultralight aircraft
- Cooper Mark IV, a single seater racing car
- Cozy MK IV, an experimental 4 place canard aircraft derived by Nat Puffer from the Burt Rutan Long-EZ
- Jaguar Mark IV (1945–1949), British car
- Continental Mark IV (1959, 1972–1976), American luxury car
- Merkava Mark IV (1999), main battle tank of Israel Defense Forces
- Triumph Spitfire, MKIV (1970–1974), a British sports car

== Weapons ==
- Webley Mk IV, a.k.a. "Boer War Model"; .455 caliber British revolver from 1899
- MK IV Series 80 M1911 pistol, semi-automatic pistol
- Mark 4 nuclear bomb (1949–1953), an American nuclear bomb

== Other ==
- Canon EOS-1D Mark IV, a digital SLR
- AI Mark IV radar, the first air-to-air radar
- Navy Mark IV (late 1950s–early 1960s), a full pressure suit designed for unpressurized military jets
- Vickers Tank Periscope MK.IV (1936), designed in Poland
- Mk IV Turtle helmet (1950s–1980s), British Army helmet, a slight design change from the Mk III Turtle helmet
