= EGF-binding protein type B =

Enzyme found in mice

Kallikrein 13

Identifiers
- EC no.: 3.4.21.119
- CAS no.: 342900-44-1

Databases
- BRENDA: enzyme data
- ExPASy: NiceZyme view
- KEGG: enzyme entry
- MetaCyc: metabolic pathway
- Rhea: reactions
- PDB structures: RCSB PDB PDBe PDBsum
Search
- PMC: articles
- PubMed: articles
- NCBI: proteins

EGF-binding protein type B (EC 3.4.21.119) also called mouse Kallikrein 13 (mK13) is an enzyme found specifically in the submandibular (saliva) glands of mice, and encoded by the gene Egfbp2. This enzyme catalyses hydrolyses mouse Ren2 protein (a species of prorenin present in the submandibular gland) on the carboxy side of the arginine residue at the Lys-Arg- pair in the N-terminus, to yield mature renin.

This enzyme belongs in peptidase family S1A. Its closest relative in humans is predicted to be kallikrein-1.

== Other names ==
It has also been called Kallikrein 13 (ambiguous), KLK13 (ambiguous), kallikrein mK13, mGK-13, mK13, mKLK13, prorenin converting enzyme 1, PRECE-1, prorenin-converting enzyme, PRECE, proteinase P
