= Mark XVII =

Mark XVII or Mark 17 often refers to the 17th version of a product, frequently military hardware. "Mark", meaning "model" or "variant", can be abbreviated "Mk."

Mark XVII or Mark 17 may refer to:

- CP Mk.XVII; a Royal Navy central-pivot single gun mount used on destroyers in the 1930s and 1940s
- De Havilland Mosquito NF Mk XVII; a Royal Air Force night fighter with British radar
- Supermarine Seafire F Mk. XVII; a Royal Navy fighter with reinforced wings and modified landing gear
- Mark XVII torpedo (1944); British 18 inch burner cycle torpedo
- Mark 17 torpedo (1945-1950), US Navy torpedo used aboard destroyers; employed hydrogen peroxide as oxidant
- Mark 17 nuclear bomb (1954-1955); the first mass-produced hydrogen bomb
- Logistics Vehicle System MK17 Rear Body Unit; US Marine Corps heavy tactical vehicle trailer incorporating a crane
- FN SCAR-H, Mk 17 Mod 0; a modular 7.62mm rifle employed by US Special Operations
