= Cooper Mk.VIII =

Formula 3 race car

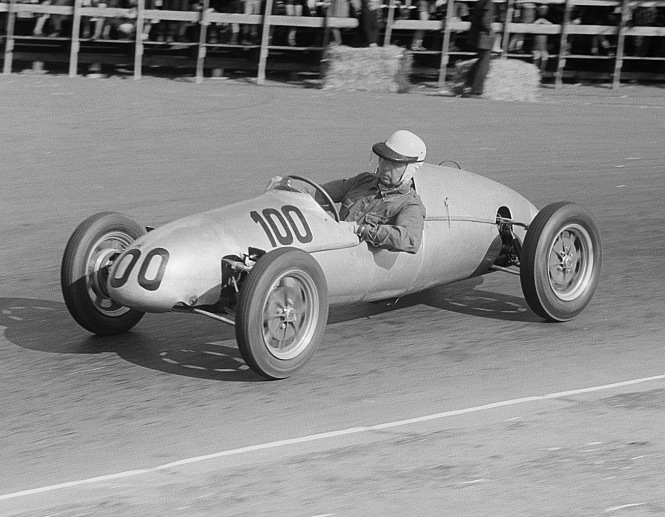
Cooper 500 Mk.VIII (1954)

The Cooper Mk.VIII is a Formula 3 car built by British manufacturer Cooper Cars in 1954. It came in three different versions. The first was the Cooper T31; which featured a curved tubular chassis, a revised transmission housing, a central scuttle tank, a "curled-leaf" spring, and a 500 cc (31 cu in) JA Prestwich Industries (JAP) single-cylinder engine. The second version was the Cooper T32; which featured an elongated chassis and body, and a larger and more powerful 1,100 cc (67 cu in) OHV V-2 engine. The third and final iteration was the Cooper T28; which was a streamliner designed for setting speed records.
