= Supermarine Spitfire (late Merlin-powered variants) =

Late Merlin-powered variants of the Supermarine Spitfire

Spitfire
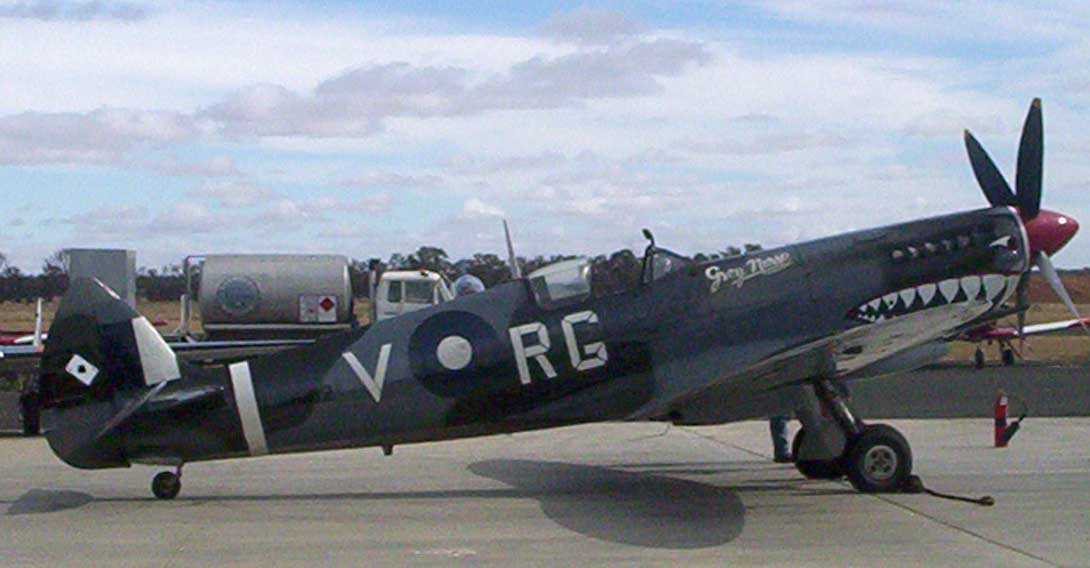
- A restored Supermarine Spitfire VIII, A58-758, in the colours and markings of Wg. Cdr Bobby Gibbes of 80 Wing RAAF, based on Morotai in 1945.

General information
- Type: Fighter / Photo-reconnaissance
- Manufacturer: Supermarine
- Designer: Joseph Smith
- Primary user: Royal Air Force
- Number built: 8,996 (20,346 total)

History
- Manufactured: 1942–1945
- Introduction date: June 1942 (Mk IX)
- First flight: September 1941 (Mk III with Merlin 61)
- Retired: 1955, RAF
- Variants: Seafire, Spiteful, Seafang

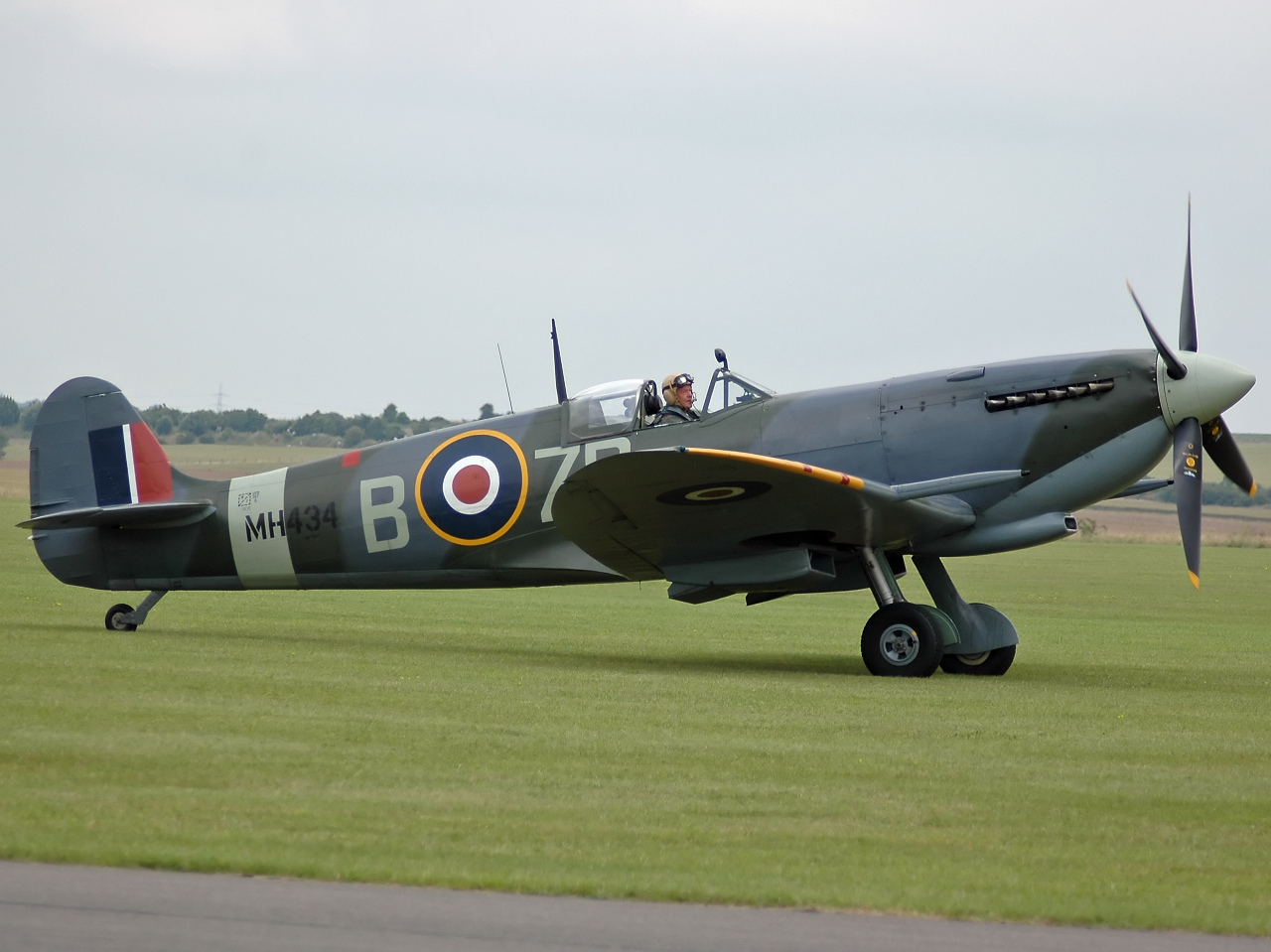
Spitfire LF Mk IX MH434 of Duxford's Old Flying Machine Company.

The British Supermarine Spitfire was facing several challenges by mid-1942. The debut of the formidable Focke-Wulf Fw 190 in late 1941 had caused problems for RAF fighter squadrons flying the latest Spitfire Mk Vb. Rolls-Royce engineers were already working on a new version of the Merlin incorporating a two-stage supercharger; the combination of the improved Merlin and the Spitfire Mk Vc airframe in a "stop-gap" design allowed the RAF to combat the Fw 190 on equal terms.

In a second stream of development Supermarine was working on an improved, reinforced, Spitfire airframe which incorporated several new features and was designed for the Merlin 60 and 70 series engines. This new airframe later formed the basis for the Rolls-Royce Griffon powered Spitfires. This article presents a history of the Spitfire powered by two-stage engine variants and also describes some of the "drawing board" projects and experimental Spitfires. The Griffon powered variants are described in a separate article.

== Wing types ==
The majority of the Spitfires from the Mk VIII on, used three basic wing types; C, D and E

=== C type ===
Also known as the "universal wing" the new design was standard on the majority of Spitfires built from mid 1942. The design of the wing was altered to reduce labour and manufacturing time and carry various armaments: A type (8 x .303 machine guns, 4 per wing), B type (4 x .303 machine guns (2 per wing) and 2 x 20mm Hispano cannons (1 per wing), or four 20 mm Hispano cannon.

The undercarriage mountings were redesigned and the undercarriage doors were bowed in cross-section allowing the legs to sit lower in the wells, eliminating the upper-wing blisters over the wheel wells and landing gear pivot points. Stronger undercarriage legs were raked 2 inches (5.08 cm) forward, making the Spitfire more stable on the ground and reducing the likelihood of the aircraft tipping onto its nose. During production of the Mk VIII and Mk IX a new undercarriage leg was introduced which had external v-shaped "scissor-links" fitted to the front of the leg; this also led to small changes in the shape of the undercarriage bay and leg fairings. Because the Spitfire was no longer to be used as a night fighter, the retractable landing lights were no longer fitted.

The Hispano Mk II adopted the French Châtellerault belt-feed system, using disintegrating-link belts stored in internal ammunition boxes, providing up to 120 rounds per gun. The fairings over the Hispano barrels were shorter and there was usually a short rubber stub covering the outer cannon port. New upper wing gun-bay doors incorporated "teardrop" shaped blisters to clear the cannon feed motors and the lower wings no longer had the gun-bay heating vents outboard of the gun-bays. The first series of Spitfire Mk IXs retained the bay doors first used on Spitfire VCs; these incorporated large blisters to clear the feed motors of two Hispano cannons. All later Spitfires had smaller, more streamlined blisters. To provide room for the belt feed system of the cannon, the inner machine gun bays were moved outboard to between ribs 13 and 14.

Several versions of the Spitfire, starting with the HF Mk VIIs had extra 13 gallon integral fuel tanks added to the wing leading edges between the wing-root and the inboard cannon bay. Although many earlier Spitfires had been modified to carry bomb racks capable of carrying 250 lb (110 kg) bombs the first Spitfires to be specifically modified for the fighter-bomber role (known as Modification 1209) were those of the Second Tactical Air Force. The first Mk IX Spitfires started being used in the role in June 1944.

=== D Type ===
These were made for photo-reconnaissance Spitfires, including the PR Mk X and XI; no armament was fitted and the D-shaped leading edges of the wings, ahead of the main spar, were converted into integral fuel tanks, each carrying 66 gallons. To avoid the expansion of fuel in hot weather damaging the wing, pressure relief valves, with small external vent pipes, were fitted near the wing tips.

=== E type ===
Structurally identical to the C wing. The outer machine gun ports were eliminated; although the outer machine-gun bays were retained, their access doors were devoid of empty cartridge case ports and cartridge deflectors. The new wing allowed for a four cannon armament and the inner bays could carry heavy machine guns. There were thus two possible weapon fits: either

- 2 × .50 cal Browning M2 machine guns with 250 rpg in the inner bays and 2 × 20 mm Hispano Mk II cannon with 120 rpg in the outer bays

or

- 4 × 20 mm Hispano cannon with 120 rpg

The .303 machine guns mounted in the outer wings were no longer fitted, because rifle calibre bullets were ineffective against heavily armoured aircraft. (These outer guns had always been the less effective part of a Spitfire's armament: their distance from the centreline made them hard to harmonise and in turning engagements, wing flexing meant that the rounds were even more widely scattered). The 20 mm Hispano cannon were moved outboard and the .50 calibre Browning M2/AN, with 250 rpg were added to the inner gun-bays. The first trial installation (modification 1029) was made in BS118 in November 1943; by mid-March 1944 the first service Spitfires to be modified were from 485 (NZ), 222 and 349 Squadrons. Spitfires with this armament were at first referred to as Spifire LF.IX .5 and the E suffix was not officially introduced until early 1945. This armament was standard for all Spitfire Mk IXs and XVIs used by the 2nd Tactical Air Force as fighters and fighter-bombers from shortly after D-Day. It proved more effective for both air-to-air engagements and air-to-ground attacks.

Many Spitfires had their elliptically "pointed" wing tips replaced by shorter, squared off fairings. This slightly improved maximum speed at low altitude and enhanced the roll rate. While many "LF" Spitfires (e.g. the LF.IX) had the "clipped" wings, a number did not. The true distinguishing feature of "LF" versions was the fitting of low-altitude versions of the Rolls-Royce Merlin engine.

== Variants ==
=== Mark numbers, type numbers ===
The Mark numbers did not necessarily indicate a chronological order, the Mk IX was a stopgap brought into production before the Mks VII and VIII. Some Spitfires of one mark or variant may have been modified to another; several of the first Mk Vbs were converted from Mk Ibs; the first Mk IXs were Mk Vcs converted, in some instances, by Rolls-Royce at their Hucknall facility.

Up until the end of 1942, the RAF names had Roman numerals for mark numbers. In the period 1943–1948 new aircraft entering service were given Arabic numerals for mark numbers but older aircraft retained Roman numerals. From 1948, Arabic numerals were used exclusively. This article adopts the convention of using Roman numerals for the Mks I–XVI and Arabic numerals for the Mks 17–24. Type numbers e.g.; (type 361) are the drawing board design numbers allocated by Supermarine.

=== Features of late Merlin powered Spitfires ===
With the development of the Merlin 61/63/66 and 70 series engines, with a two-stage, two-speed supercharger requiring an intercooler, several important modifications were made to the basic airframe and applied to all aircraft powered by these engines. The longer Merlin 61 meant the nose forward of the engine/fuel tank bulkhead was 7 inches (17.8 cm) longer. An intercooler was mounted behind the engine, on the supercharger casing. A small rectangular air scoop for a "Heywood" air compressor was fitted on the starboard upper engine cowling.

The carburettor air intake on early to mid-production Spitfire IXs was a different shape from those of single-stage engined aircraft; they were shorter and had a wider air inlet. From 1943, an "Aero-Vee" tropical filter in a long, streamlined fairing was introduced for the carburettor air intake. This was fitted as standard to all Mk VIIs, VIIIs, PR Mk Xs and Mk XVIs, on mid to late production Mk IXs, and to most PR Mk XIs.

A new 10 ft 9 in (3.27 m) diameter four-bladed Rotol propeller was fitted, housed in a pointed spinner. The exhaust units were changed to six "fishtail" stacks per side. Under the nose, the three piece cowling was changed to a one piece layout. The oil tank was no longer a part of the cowling structure. Early Mk IXs had a teardrop shaped blister (a bulge) for a Coffman engine starter (Note: The Coffman starter was connected to the propeller reduction gearbox and used large shotgun-like cartridges loaded into a chamber to "kick-start" the engine. It was first used on the Spitfire Mk II and was also used by Napier Sabre powered aircraft.)on the lower starboard side cowling, just behind the propeller. This was replaced by an improved electric starter on most two-stage Merlin powered Spitfires and, from late 1942 the blister like bulge was seen on only a few aircraft.

The Type C wing was fitted as standard. Some mid and most late production Spifire Mk IXs and all Mk XVI were fitted with the Type E wing. While Spitfire IXs converted from Mk Vcs had the large teardrop fairings on the upper surfaces, on the majority of Mk VIIs, VIIIs, IXs and XVIs the teardrop shaped blisters covering the Hispano feed motors were reduced in size and more streamlined than those on the Mk Vc. According to A.P 1565J P & L (Spitfire IX, XI and XVI Pilot's Notes) the red painted undercarriage indicator rods, which projected through the tops of the wings when the undercarriage was down, were used only on early production Mk IXs. When fitted these rods supplemented an "Electric visual indicator" mounted on the instrument panel. The indicator rods seemed to be fitted on all Mk VIIs and VIIIs, supplementing the electric visual indicator. A light for the retractable tailwheel was mounted on the instrument panel, just below the main visual indicator. (Note: In addition to the visual undercarriage aids, early Mk IXs and all Mk VIIs and VIIIs had an undercarriage warning horn which sounded if the undercarriage was still retracted with the engine throttled back. This horn was a legacy from pre-war operations when several Spitfires were accidentally landed with the undercarriage still up.)

Because the intercooler required a radiator, the radiator under the starboard wing was halved in size and the intercooler radiator housed alongside. Under the port wing a new radiator fairing housed a square oil cooler alongside the other half-radiator unit. When the engine was running at low speed, one radiator section provided enough coolant; a thermostatic switch turned off the starboard radiator section until more power was called for and extra engine cooling was required.

Other structural changes included flush riveting for the fuselage, introduced in mid-1943. A streamlined round rear-view mirror, with a bullet-shaped fairing replaced the rectangular version. On new production Mk IXs the small, teardrop shaped identification light behind the radio mast was removed.

While early Mk IXs converted from Mk Vcs had the original (smaller) elevator horn mass-balances, most had the enlarged version with the straightened leading edge. A new rudder of greater area, which could be identified by a "pointed" tip, was fitted to many Mk VIIs, Mk VIIIs, and mid to late production Mk IXs and Mk XVIs.

All Mk VII and Mk VIII Spitfires had the following changes: The internal structure was strengthened and revised. On the wings the ailerons were reduced in span by 8.5 inches (220 mm) outboard of the outer hinges. There had been some instances of earlier models breaking up in the air in steep high speed dives, it was thought, because of aileron flutter. (Note: After a series of accidents to Mk Vs in 1942 the A&AEE concluded that the break ups were due to longitudinal-instability, resulting from incorrect loading of the aircraft on the squadrons causing the centre of gravity to be outside the safe limits.)

The main fuselage fuel tanks were increased in capacity; 47 gal (213.7 L) for the upper tank and 49 gal (222.7 L) for the lower. In combination with the wing tanks this gave a total internal capacity of 122 gal (554.6 L), a near 50% increase over the 85 gal (386.4 L) carried by earlier Spitfire marks. In addition a 13 gal (64 L) fuel tank was fitted in each wing leading edge between the wingroot and the inner gun-bay.

The main undercarriage legs, for the first time in the Spitfire's life, were fitted with forward-facing torque links. In addition, the leg doors were slightly concave, allowing the undercarriage to sit lower in the wheel wells when retracted: this meant the upper wing skinning was free of the small bulge which had hitherto been necessary to clear the wheels. The wheels themselves were a new strengthened Dunlop AH10019 "four spoke" pattern, replacing the "five spoke" pattern used since the first Mk Is. This revised undercarriage was also fitted on some mid to late Mk IXs and all Mk XVIs. A retractable tailwheel (Dunlop 2184) was fitted, covered by small doors when in flight. This also applied to the PR Mk Xs and most PR Mk XIs.

=== Mk VII (type 351) ===
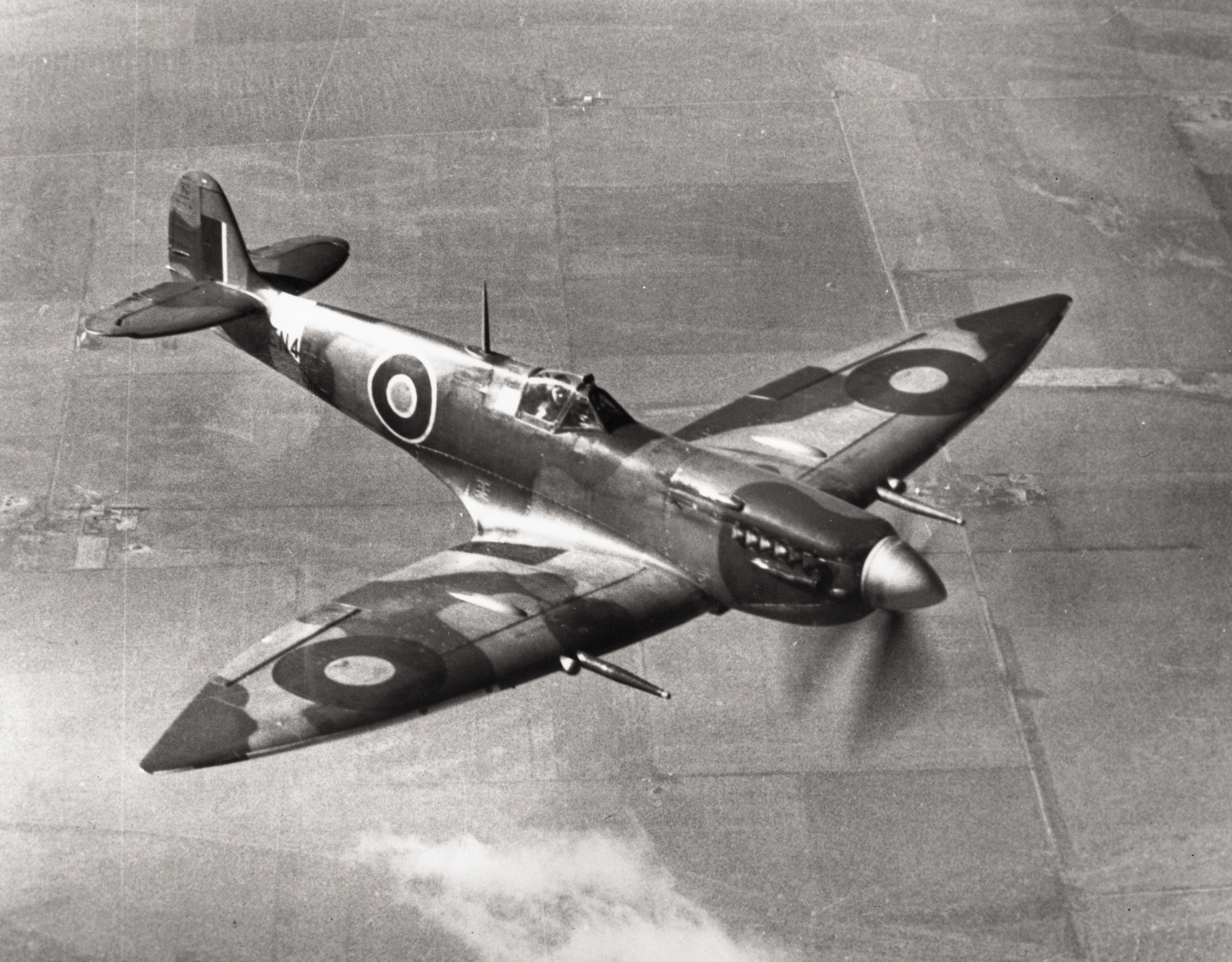
This Spitfire HF Mk VII EN474 was tested by the USAAF and is now housed at the Smithsonian National Air and Space Museum, the only surviving example of a Mk VII. Note the "pointed", extended wingtips and the cabin pressurisation air intake under the exhausts.

Like the Mk VI, the Mk VII was a high altitude pressurised variant, this time powered by the Merlin 64 (F. Mk. VII) or 71 (H.F. Mk. VII) series engine with two-stage, two-speed superchargers. (Note: A prototype of the Mk VII, AB450, was converted from a Mk V and used a Merlin 61, otherwise the 64/71s were used.) The cockpit was pressurised in a similar way to that of the Mk VI, although the details were slightly different. Other changes to the airframe are noted above. The Mk VII used a Marshall manufactured compressor for pressurising the cockpit; this was mounted on the right of the engine and drew its air through a long intake under the starboard exhaust stubs. An automatic valve allowed a maximum pressure differential of +2 lb./sq.in. This was built up during the climb and was maintained at heights of 28,000 ft and above.

Extended, "pointed" wingtips were fitted to the Type C wings, increasing the wingspan to 40 ft 2 in (12.2 m). Because the threat from high altitude bombers never materialised many Mk VIIs later reverted to the normal, rounded wingtip.

While early Mk VIIs were fitted with a detachable canopy, secured by four pilot-operated catches, later Mk VIIs were fitted with a "Lobelle"-type hood which opened by sliding backwards, as on non-pressurised versions of the Spitfire. This was a big improvement on the clampdown cockpit of the Mk VI. The canopy was double-glazed and used rubber tubing to create a proper pressure seal against the fuselage. The canopy rails were bulkier than the standard Spitfire type.

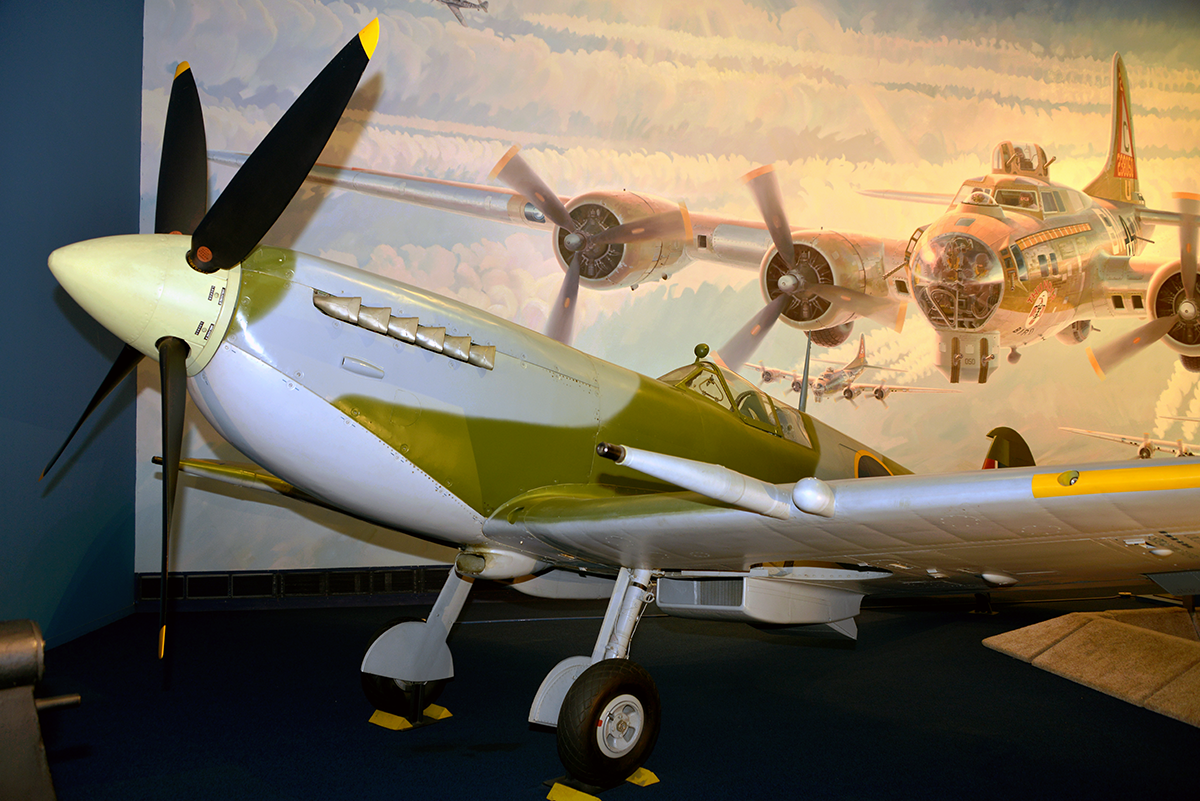
Spitfire Mk. VIIc EN474 on display in the World War II Aviation exhibition at NASM.

In total, 140 Mk VIIs were built by Supermarine. Most of them were powered by the Merlin 64 (F. Mk. VII) or Merlin 71 (H.F Mk. VII), the latter fitted with a Bendix-Stromberg "anti-g" carburettor. The HF Mk had superb high-altitude performance, with a service ceiling of 45,100 feet (13,700 m); French ace Pierre Clostermann recalls in his book, The Big Show, the successful interception of a long-range reconnaissance Messerschmitt Bf 109G-6/R3 by a Mk VII 'Strato Spitfire' of 602 Squadron at 40,000 feet (12,000 m) over the British Home Fleet's base at Scapa Flow in early 1944.

=== Mk VIII (type 360) ===
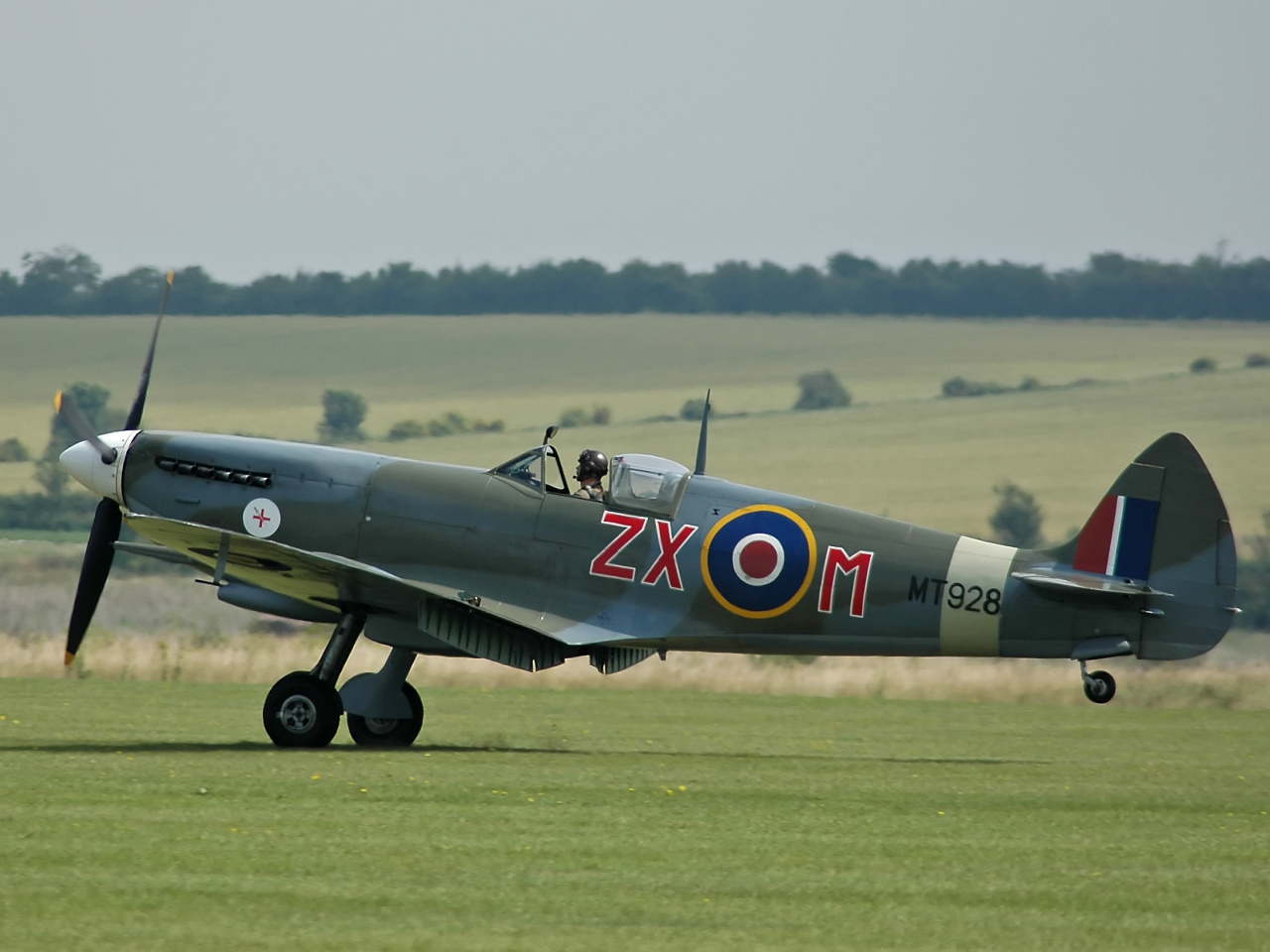
Spitfire Mk VIII

The Mk VIII was an adaptation of the Mk VII without the pressurised cabin and was intended to become the main production model of the Spitfire. When the "interim" Mk IX proved to be adequate against the German Focke-Wulf Fw 190 it was decided to use the shadow factory at Castle Bromwich to produce that version only; the Mk VIII Spitfires were all built by Supermarine. Apart from the lack of pressurisation, the Mk VIII differed little from the Mk VII beyond the reshaped fin and pointed rudder.

Some early production models had extended wingtips but the majority were fitted with the standard version. According to Supermarine's Chief Test pilot Jeffrey Quill "When I am asked which mark of Spitfire I consider the best from the flying point of view, I usually reply 'The Mark VIII with standard wingtips.' I hated the extended wingtips...They were of no practical value to the Mark VIII and simply reduced the aileron response and the rate of roll." New Zealand ace Alan Peart described the extended wingtips causing structural damage to Mk VII Spitfires in Burma, and being replaced by standard wingtips. There were three sub-variants for low altitude (LF Mk VIII), medium altitude (F Mk VIII) and high altitude (HF Mk VIII) which were powered respectively by the Merlin 66, Merlin 63 and Merlin 70 engines.

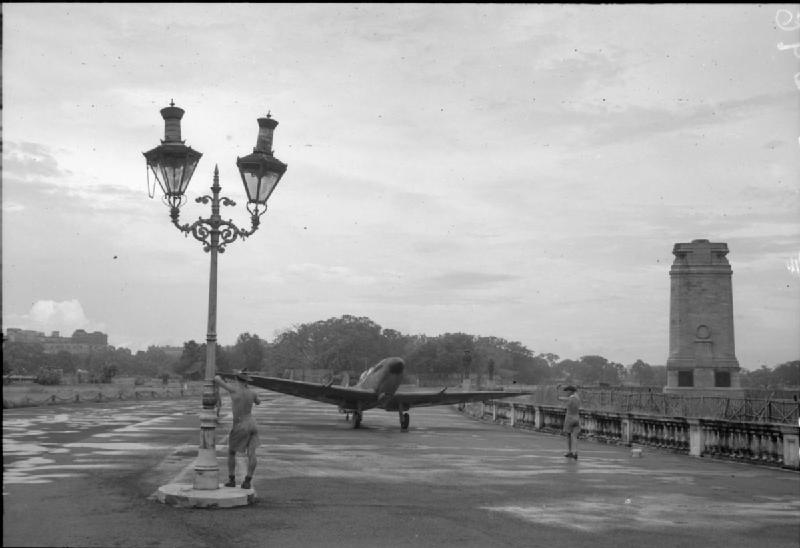
Spitfire Mark VIII taxies to the end of the Red Road airstrip in Calcutta, India.

The F Mk VIII's top speed was 408 mph (657 km/h) at 25,000 ft (404 mph for the LF Mk VIII at 21,000 ft (6,400 m) and 416 mph (669 km/h) for the HF Mk VIII at 26,500 ft), with a service ceiling of 43,000 ft (41,500 ft for the LF Mk VIII and 44,000 ft (13,000 m) for the HF Mk VIII). The two main tanks were given an extra 11 gal for a total of 96 gal which, along with the wing tanks, allowed the fighter to fly for a maximum distance of 660 mi (1,060 km) with a full internal fuel load and 1,180 miles (1,900 km) with a full internal load and a 90 gal drop tank. Provision was made to allow the Mk VIII to carry a single "slipper" drop tank of 30, 90 or 170 gal capacity. With a 170 gal tank, the aeroplane could fly over 1,500 mi (2,400 km). When carrying the 90 or 175 gal tank the aircraft was restricted, once airborne and at cruising altitude, to straight and level flight. A maximum external bomb load of 1,000 pounds (1 × 500 lb (230 kg) bomb attached to the centre bomb-rack plus a 250 lb (110 kg) bomb under each wing) could be carried.

A Mk VIII JF299 was used to experiment with the use of a new cut-back rear fuselage and a "tear-drop" canopy. This was intended to aid pilot visibility; many Spitfire pilots who were shot down were done so by enemies who approached in the aircraft's blind spot. In trials, the new hood design was found to bring about great improvements to all-round visibility and with several modifications, was standardised on later Spitfires.

This variant served almost exclusively overseas in the Mediterranean, with the Desert Air Force and the USAAF, in the South West Pacific Area, with the Royal Australian Air Force and RAF and in the South-East Asian theatre with the RAF. After the Mk IX and Mk V, the Mk VIII was the third most numerous operational variant with 1,658 examples built.

=== Mk IX (type 361) ===
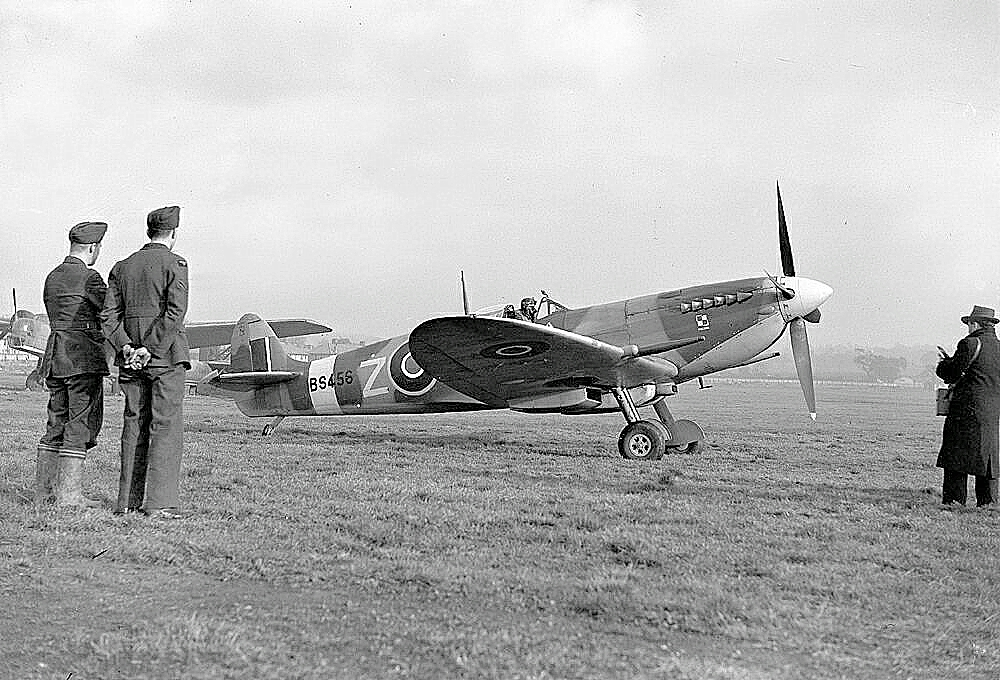
BS456 UZ-Z of 306 (Polish) Toruński Squadron, RAF Northolt, November 1942. A Spitfire Mk IX converted from a Mk Vc airframe. A teardrop shaped blister for a Coffman cartridge starter can be seen just behind the propeller. This aircraft carries a 30-gallon "slipper" drop tank under the fuselage.

In the early months of 1942, with the clear superiority of the Focke-Wulf Fw 190 over the Spitfire Mk Vb, there was much pressure to get Spitfires into production using the new two-stage supercharged Merlin 61 engine. In September 1941 the Spitfire Mk III prototype N3297 had been converted by Rolls-Royce at their Hucknall plant to take a Merlin 60, which had been specifically designed for use in the Wellington Mk VI high altitude bomber.

The performance increase was described by Jeffrey Quill as a "quantum leap" over that of the Mk Vb and another Spitfire airframe, R6700 was modified to take the new engine. Although design work on the Mk VII and VIII series was under way, these would take over a year to get into production and a counter to the Fw 190 was urgently needed. The Air Ministry made the decision that Mk Vc airframes should be converted to take the more powerful engine and, as a result, many of the early Mk IXs were converted Mk Vcs which did not have any of the refinements which later appeared. These could be identified by the Type C wing with the large double blisters over the inner cannon bays and the identification light on the fuselage spine, behind the aerial mast. The elevator horns were also smaller in size than that of most Mk IXs which had larger horn balances. The first Mk IX was a modified Mk Vc AB505, which was tested by the Air Fighting Development Unit (AFDU) in April 1942. (Note: Some of very early Mk IXs were converted by Rolls-Royce at Hucknall with engine cowlings from Mk Vcs extended with a new section welded onto the rear and extemporised blisters added, covering the intercooler which was mounted on the supercharger of the Merlin 61.) The report said;

The performance of the Spitfire IX is outstandingly better than the Spitfire V especially at heights above 20,000 feet. On the level the Spitfire is considerably faster and climb is exceptionally good. It will climb easily to 38,000 feet and when levelled off there can be made to climb in stages to above 40,000 feet by building up speed on the level and a slight zoom. Its manoeuvrability is as good as a Spitfire V up to 30,000 feet and above is very much better. At 38,000 feet it is capable of a true speed of 368mph and is still able to manoeuvre well for fighting.

Although the Mk IX's airframe did not have the aerodynamic and strength improvements, or the modified control surfaces of the Mk VII and VIII, the Mk IX still proved to be an effective counter to the Focke-Wulf Fw 190.

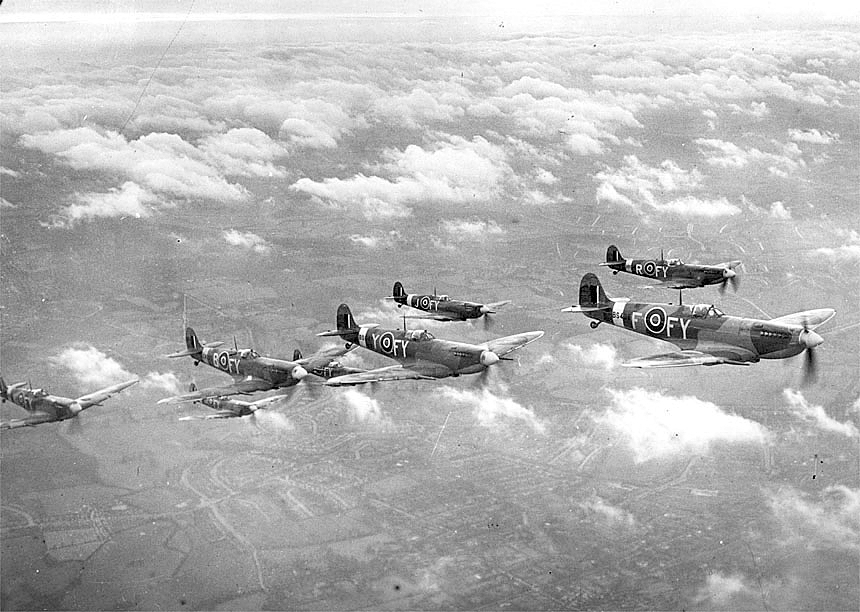
Early Mark IXbs of 611 Squadron based at Biggin Hill in late 1942. Note the large cannon blisters and ID lights behind the mast, denoting converted Mk Vcs.

In September 1942, the "High Altitude Flight" was set up at RAF Northolt to counter the threat of the high altitude Junkers Ju 86 R bombers. Two Spitfire Mk IXs converted from Vcs were stripped of armour, the .303 Brownings and other equipment and repainted in a lightweight PRU blue finish. One of them intercepted a Ju 86R at over 40,000 feet (12,000 m).

Production of the Mk IX finished at Supermarine in June 1943, with production continuing exclusively at the Castle Bromwich factory. Several major and large numbers of minor improvements were progressively introduced to Mk IXs, some of which were used on other Spitfire variants.

The Merlin 61 was phased out early in 1943 in favour of the Merlin 63 and 63A. The new engine had increased power resulting from engine improvements and engine limitations of +18 lbf/(sq in) and 3,000 rpm (5 minute combat). During the second half of 1943, production of the Merlin 63 powered F Mk IX was discontinued in favour of the Merlin 66 powered LF Mk IX. Early production Spitfire Mk IXs suffered from vapour locks in the fuel lines resulting from fuel evaporating if the aircraft was parked in direct sunlight. As a result of this the gun-camera was moved from the port wingroot to the starboard wingroot and a fuel cooler, fed by a small round air-intake was fitted in its place. This fuel cooler was also fitted to early PR Mk XIs.

Production of the LF Mk IXs, frequently referred to as the Spitfire Mk IXb, initially ran in parallel with the Merlin 63 powered Marks. This version first became operational in March 1943 with the Biggin Hill Wing, comprised at the time of 611 and 341 (Free French) Squadrons. This type was by far the most produced of the Spitfire Mk IX variants, with over 4,000 built. The maximum power of the Merlin 66 was 1,720 hp (1,280 kW) at 5,750 ft (1,283 kW at 1,752 m) and the maximum speed of the Spitfire LF Mk IX was 404 mph (650 km/h) at 21,000 feet (6,400 m). The Merlin 66 introduced a new Bendix-Stromberg injection carburettor, which replaced the earlier S.U float carburettor.

The HF Mk IX was powered by the specialised high altitude Merlin 70 and entered service in the spring of 1944. Serial listings show that the HF Mk IX was produced in relatively limited numbers when they were required, with priority being given to versions rated for low and medium altitudes (Note: HF Mk IXs were produced under the ML, NH, PL, PT, PV, TA, TB, TD and TE serial number prefixes; about 400 were built.) Maximum power of the Merlin 70 was 1,710 hp (1,280 kW) at 11,000 ft (1,275 kW at 3,353 m): maximum speed of the Spitfire HF Mk IX was 405 mph (652 km/h) at 25,400 feet (7,700 m) at an all-up weight of 7,320 lb (3,320 kg).

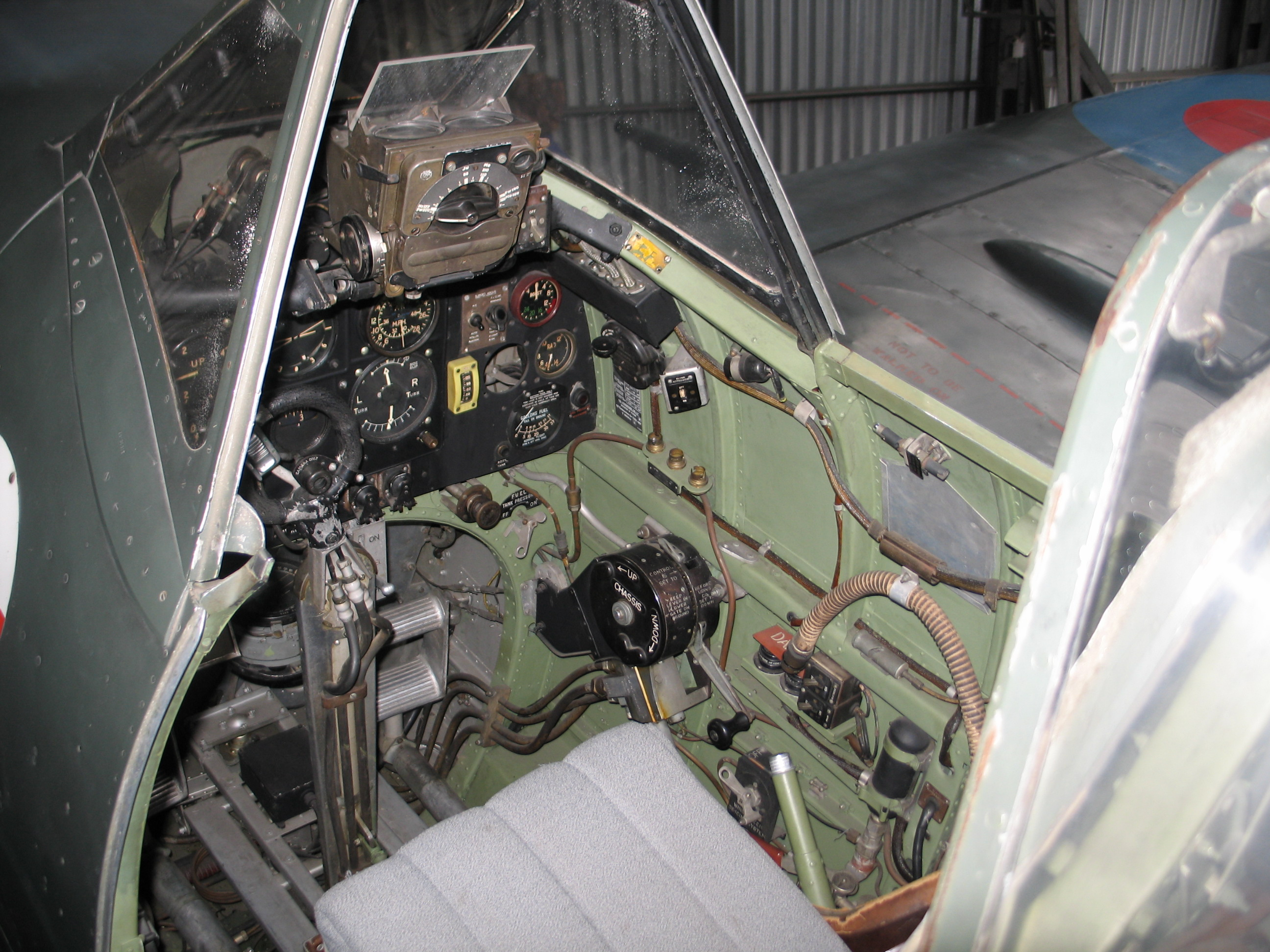
The cockpit of a Spitfire Mk IX showing the instrument panel and the Mk II Gyro gunsight.

Also introduced in early 1944 was a new Mark II Gyro gunsight. This gunsight calculated the correct angle of deflection to use when leading the target. Its introduction doubled the effectiveness of RAF gunnery and was a major factor in Allied air superiority.

The capacity of the main fuel tanks was 48 gal for the upper tank and 37 gal for the lower, for a total internal capacity of 85 gal. Jettisonable "slipper tanks" of 30, 45 or 90 gal could be carried under the centre-section. As an alternative a cylindrical 50 gal drop tank, adapted from those carried by long range Hawker Typhoons, could be carried on the fuselage bomb rack used on most Mk IXs of the Second Tactical Air Force. To further increase the combat radius some late production Mk IXs were fitted with additional internal self-sealing fuel tanks in the rear fuselage: the upper tank carried 41 gal and the lower 34 gal. When both were full this enabled a ferry range of over 1,200 miles (1,900 km), although they made the aircraft unstable in flight and only straight flight and gentle manoeuvres at low altitudes were recommended by the pilot's manual. The pilot was also warned to avoid instrument flying whenever possible.

Late production Mk IXs, in common with Mk XVIs introduced a new upper engine cowling which incorporated a distinct bulged top surface; this design was adopted for the Mk XVI to allow for the modified intercooler of the Packard Merlin 266, which had an integral header tank.

The cut-down rear fuselage and bubble canopy, trialled on a Spitfire Mk VIII, was incorporated into very late production Mk IXs. With the cut down fuselage the lower forward fuselage tank capacity was increased to 47 gallons, while the rear fuel tanks were decreased to a capacity of 66 gallons. These were the rarest of the Mk IXs and many of them featured the "clipped" wings. The great majority of these saw postwar service with the SAAF, both in South Africa and in deployment in Korea during the 1950s.

During early 1945, some Spitfires IXe and XVIe of 74 Squadron were fitted with a single RP-3 rocket under each wing. This was believed to be the only RAF Spitfire unit to use rockets operationally during the Second World War.

=== PR Mk IX (type 374) and FR Mk IX ===
Pending development of a dedicated Merlin 61 powered PR Spitfire (the Mk XI) at least three Mk IXs (BS338, BS339 and BS473) were taken off the production line and modified to carry two vertical cameras in the rear fuselage. The first of these was delivered to 541 Squadron at RAF Benson on 30 November 1942. Subsequently, another 15 Mk IXs were converted to PR Mk IXs (factory designation type 374) at the Vickers-Armstrong Worthy Down facility. As well as incorporating camera equipment, a wrap-around PR type windscreen was fitted and a larger oil tank was installed under the nose. All armament was removed and a PRU Blue finish applied. These aircraft lacked the "wet wing" tanks, meaning that the PR Mk IX relied on drop tanks for extra range. The most famous PR Mk IX missions involved carrying out reconnaissance missions in preparation for Operation Chastise, the 617 "Dambusters" Squadron attacks on the Ruhr dams. A PR Mk IX photographed the dams the day before the operation and photographed the Moehne Dam after the operation.

FR IXs were standard, armed Mk IXs modified with a single, port-facing, oblique camera. These aircraft were used for low altitude "Dicing" missions in tactical support of army operations. 16 Squadron, which was a unit of the 2nd TAF, used several FR Mk IXs (painted a pale, "Camoutint" Pink, which provided excellent camouflage under cloud cover) to photograph the Arnhem area before and during Operation Market Garden. Another unit using FR Mk IXs was 318 (Polish) "City of Gdańsk" Fighter-Reconnaissance Squadron based in the Mediterranean. Some Spitfires in the MJ- and MK- serial ranges, sent for repair to the Forward Repair Unit (FRU), were also converted by the FRU to a different style of FR Mk IXc with streamlined blisters on both sides of the fuselage. These were used exclusively by No. 414 Squadron RCAF to replace its TAC-R Mustangs. The same conversion was used on F Mk XIVe Spitfires to make FR Mk XIVe Spitfires used exclusively by No. 430 Squadron RCAF.

=== T Mk IX and TR 9 (type 509) ===
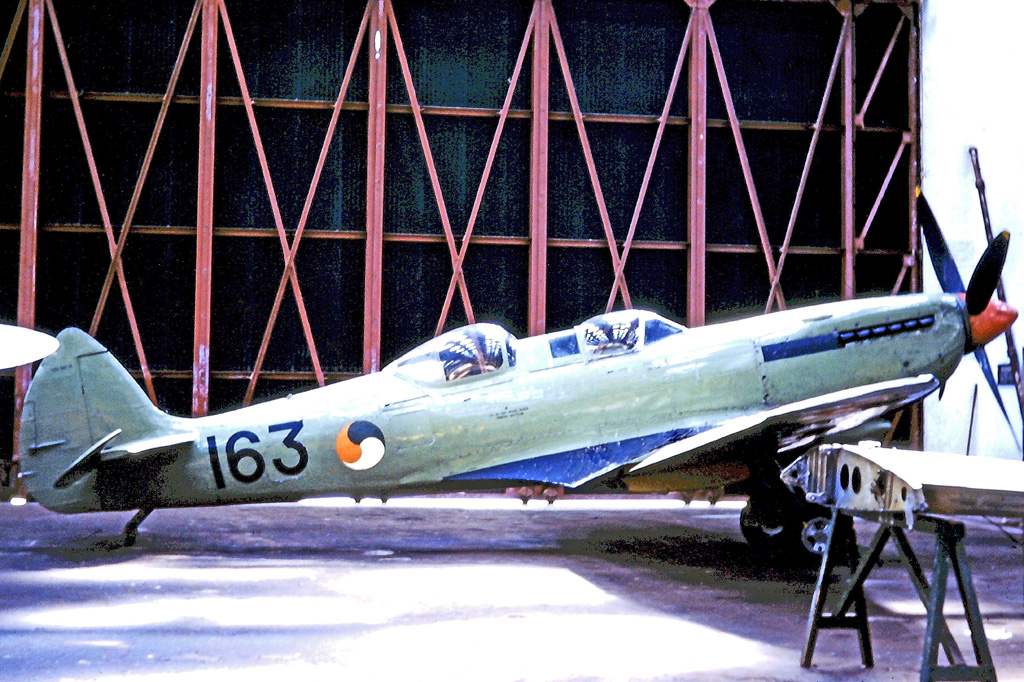
Irish Air Corps Spitfire T.9

Although there were wartime conversions of the Spitfire into a two-seat trainer including the one-off modification of a Mk Vc by No. 261 Squadron RAF and a Mk IX converted for use as a trainer by the Soviets, the two-seat Spitfire trainer was primarily a postwar programme. In 1946, a Mk VIII (MT818) was the first Vickers-built trainer built as a demonstrator, but in 1948, 10 Spitfire T Mk IXs, were exported to India. In 1951, a further six TR 9 trainers were converted from the standard Mk IX to train pilots for the Irish Air Corps (IAC) Seafire fleet. The Spitfires provided transition training that included gunnery practice since the type was equipped with two .303 Browning machine guns, one in each outer wing bay. Most of the TR 9 aircraft passed to the ground technical training school at Baldonnel where they were used as instructional airframes for the training of aircraft engineers for the Air Corps. Four of the IAC aircraft survived and two went on to join the warbird fleet in the 1970s and later.

In total, 5,656 Mk IXs were built, 561 by Supermarine and 5,095 by Castle Bromwich. Production of the Mk IX ended in April 1945 and, in combination with the Mk XVI this "compromise" was produced in larger numbers than any other Spitfire variant.

=== PR Mk X and PR Mk XI (types 387, 365 and 370) ===
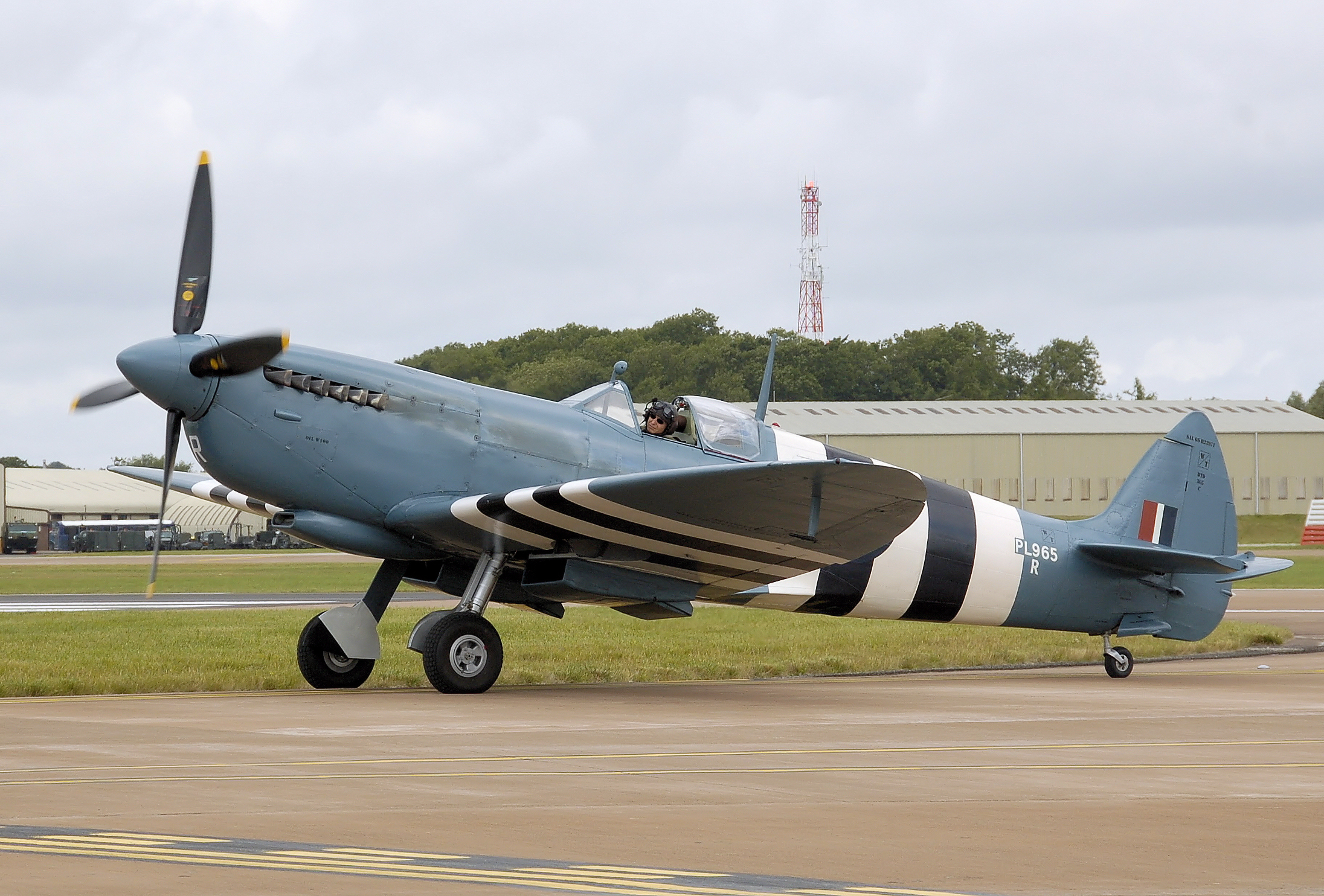
Spitfire PR Mk XI in 2008. The PR variant can be recognised by the larger-capacity deeper oil tank under the nose made necessary by the greater duration of the long-range reconnaissance flights.

When development started on new Merlin 60 powered Spitfires, both the Mk VII and VIII were to have photo-reconnaissance (PR) variants. On 21 April 1942, an order was placed for 70 aircraft, provisionally designated PR Mk VIII. Based on the revised MK VIII airframe these aircraft were to be powered by Merlin 61s and were assigned serial numbers LV643–681 and LV726-756. The Spitfires bearing these serials were eventually built as Merlin 66 LF Mk VIIIs.

A policy change resulted in the pressurised PR variant of the Mk VII being renamed PR Mk X (type 387). This version followed the PR Mk XI into production and was based on the Mk VII airframe with PR Mk XI wings and camera installation. It had the pressurised Mk VII cockpit, with the Lobelle sliding canopy, and retained the fighter style windscreen with the bullet-proof glass panel. The long thin air intake to the cockpit pressurisation system was fitted under the exhaust stacks on the starboard cowling. The performance was similar to that of the PR XI although the pressurised cockpit meant that this version could stay at altitudes of over 40,000 ft for longer without the exhausting physiological effects experienced by the pilots of unpressurised cockpits. Sixteen Mk Xs were built during April and May 1944, with the first mission being flown on 11 May. All saw limited service in 541 Squadron and 542 Squadron for high altitude reconnaissance. Experience with this version led to the development and production of the pressurised version of the PR Mk XIX.

The Mk XI (type 365 standard, type 370 tropicalised) was based on a combination of features from the marks VII, VIII and IX. The Mk XI was the first PR variant to have the option of using two vertically mounted F52 cameras with 36-inch-focal-length lens in the fuselage behind the cockpit. Several other configurations could be fitted, depending on the mission; the X Type installation, for example had two vertically mounted F24s with 14-inch lens and an oblique F24 with an 8-inch lens mounted above and facing to port. PR Mk XIs used for tactical reconnaissance had an additional, vertically oriented camera in a fairing under each wing.

Physically the Mk XIs had a deeper nose fairing to accommodate a larger 14.5 gal oil tank and used the unarmoured, wrap-around PRU windscreen. Booster pumps for the wing tanks were fitted and covered by teardrop shaped fairings under the wings. Retractable tailwheels were fitted as standard and the majority of the Mk XIs built had the later large-area pointed rudder. 260 Mk XIs were powered by Merlin 61, 63 or 63A engines, while the remaining 211 used the high-altitude Merlin 70. All of the Merlin 70 and 198 of the Merlin 60 series aircraft were fitted with the Vokes Aero-Vee dust filter in the extended, streamlined carburettor air intake under the nose. All Merlin 60 powered aircraft featured the fuel cooler in the port leading edge wing root. The radio installation was either the VHF TR.1133 or TR.1143 fitted with the "Rebecca" beam approach equipment.

Additional slipper drop tanks could be fitted under the centre-section; in common with the Mk IX these could be 30, 45 or 90 gal capacity and, for the Mk XI, a tank of 170 gal capacity was also available.

Spitfire PR Mk XIs were capable of a top speed of 417 mph (671 km/h) at 24,000 ft (7,300 m) and could cruise at 395 mph (636 km/h) at 32,000 ft (9,800 m). Normally Spitfire XIs cruised between these altitudes although, in an emergency, the aircraft could climb to 44,000 ft (13,000 m) However, pilots could not withstand such altitudes for long in a non-pressurised cockpit without suffering from serious physiological effects.

At first, production of the PR Mk XI was delayed because development of the Mk VII and VIII series was delayed. As a result, it was decided to base the Merlin 60 powered PR aircraft on the Mk IX airframe. Production was further threatened because of a dispute over RAF PR doctrine: in early 1943, because the new PR Spitfire was delayed, the Air Ministry proposed that all PR units be converted to de Havilland Mosquitoes. After further analysis the Air Staff agreed that Mosquitoes could perform 90% of PR missions so the Spitfire production for only 10% of PR units was mooted. Air Vice Marshal John Slessor, head of Coastal Command pointed out that the Spitfire was smaller than the Mosquito, used half the number of Merlin engines and was faster, more manoeuvrable and quieter and, therefore production should be increased, not reduced. As a result, the Air Staff decided that PR Mk XI production should be accelerated at the cost of the fighters.

The first Mk XIs were built in November 1942: from April 1944 production ran concurrently with the PR Mk XIX before ending in December 1944, when they were phased out in favour of the Mk XIX. In total 471 Mk XI were built by Supermarine.

=== PR Mk XIII ===
The PR Mk XIII was an improved PR Type G with a single-stage Merlin engine and is described in Supermarine Spitfire (early Merlin powered variants)

=== Mk XVI (type 361) ===
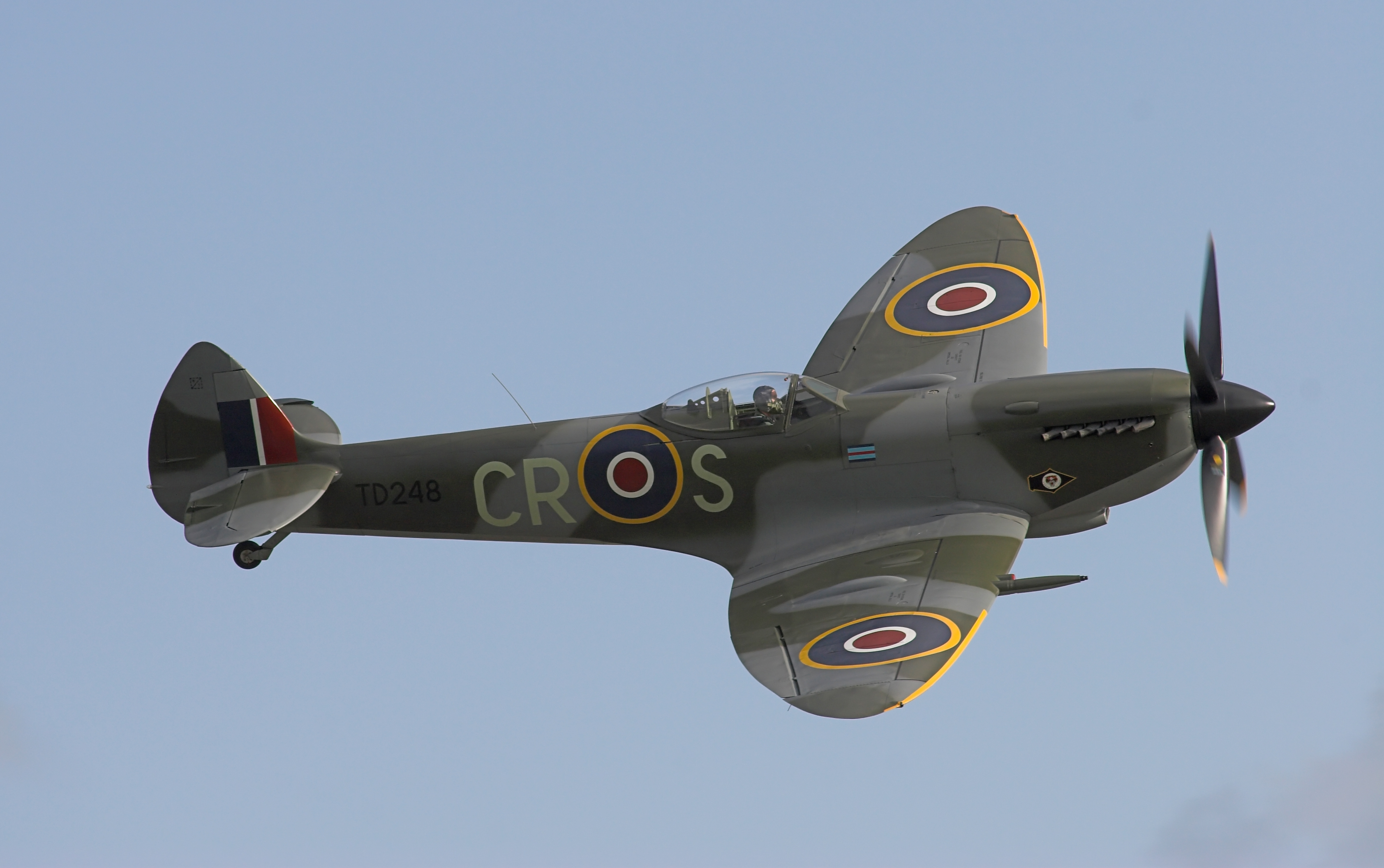
A late Spitfire Mk XVIe with the teardrop canopy. This is TD248, currently flying at Duxford.

The Mk XVI was the same as the Mk IX in nearly all respects except for the engine, a Merlin 266. The Merlin 266 was a version of the Merlin 66 built under licence in the United States by the Packard Motor Company. The "2" was added as a prefix in order to avoid confusion with the engines, as they required different tooling. All Mk XVI aircraft produced were of the Low-Altitude Fighter (LF) variety. This was not determined by the length of the wings (clipped wings were fitted to most LF Spitfires), but by the engine, which had been optimised for low-altitude operation. Almost all production Mk XVIs had clipped wings for low altitude work and were fitted with the rear fuselage fuel tanks with a combined capacity of 75 gal. Many XVIs featured cut-down rear fuselages with bubble canopies. On these aircraft the rear fuselage tank capacity was limited to 66 gal.

Because of a slightly taller intercooler and rearranged accessories on the Packard Merlins a new, bulged upper cowling was introduced and also appeared on late production IXs.

Armament for most Mk XVIs consisted of 2 × 20 mm Hispano II cannon – each with 120 rpg – and 2 × .50 calibre Browning machine guns – each with 250 rpg. 1 × 500 lb (227 kg) bomb could be carried underneath the centre rack, and 1 × 250 lb (114 kg) bomb could be slung under each wing. Some production aircraft had rear fuselage fuel tanks in addition to the main tank which allowed it to fly approximately as far as the Spitfire Mk VIII. Problems with the licence-built engines limited introduction to front-line squadrons for several months. A total of 1,054 Mk XVIs were built by Castle Bromwich.

=== Spitfire Floatplanes (types 355 and 359) ===
The Spitfire Vb floatplane W3760

With the German invasion of Norway in April 1940 the RAF took an interest in the concept of using floatplane fighters in areas where airfields were not immediately available. To this end a Spitfire Mk I R6722 was taken in hand at the Woolston factory to be modified and mounted on Blackburn Roc floats. Tank tests were carried out at Farnborough, using a 1/7 scale model, it was found that the concept was basically sound, although the vertical tail surfaces would need to be enlarged to counterbalance the side area of the floats. The end of the Battle of Norway and the need for as many Spitfires as possible meant that R6772 was converted back to an ordinary fighter without being flown. With the entry of Japan into the war the concept was revived in early 1942. A Spitfire V W3760 was fitted with a pair of floats 25 ft 7 in (7.8 m) long, mounted on cantilever legs. This aircraft was powered by a Merlin 45 driving a four-bladed propeller of 11 ft 3 in (3.43 m) diameter (3.4 m). A Vokes filter was fitted to the carburettor air intake and under the tail an extra fin extension was added.

Other changes included external lifting points forward of and behind the cockpit and a spin-recovery parachute with a rudder balance-horn guard. The Spitfire floatplane was first flown on 12 October 1942 by Jeffrey Quill. Soon afterwards the Vokes filter was replaced by an Aero-Vee filter, similar to that on later Merlin 61 series aircraft, which was extended to prevent water entry, and full Mk Vb armament was installed. Two more Vbs EP751 and EP754 were converted by Folland and all three floatplanes were transported to Egypt, arriving in October 1943. At the time it was thought that the floatplanes could operate from concealed bases in the Dodecanese Islands, disrupting supply lines to German outposts in the area which relied on resupply by transport aircraft. This scheme came to naught when a large number of German troops, backed by the Luftwaffe, took over the British held islands of Kos and Leros. No other role could be found for the floatplane Spitfires, which languished in Egypt, operating from the Great Bitter Lake. Specifications for the Vb based floatplane included a maximum speed of 324 mph (521 km/h) at 19,500 ft (521 km/h at 5,943 m), a maximum rate of climb of 2,450 ft/min at 15,500 ft (12.45 m/s at 4,724 m) and an estimated service ceiling of 33,400 ft (10,180 m). (Note: Based on figures taken from a trials report of the prototype taken at the Marine Aircraft Experimental Establishment (MAEE) at Helensburgh (near Glasgow) in 1943.)

In the spring of 1944, with the prospect of use in the Pacific Theatre, a Spitfire IX MJ892 was converted to a floatplane. This used the same components as the earlier Mk Vb conversions. Jeffrey Quill wrote:

The Spitfire IX on floats was faster than the standard Hurricane. Its handling on the water was extremely good and its only unusual feature was a tendency to "tramp" from side to side on the floats, or to "waddle" a bit when the floats were planing at high speed.

Soon after testing started the idea of using floatplane fighters was dropped and MJ982 was converted back to a landplane.

Five aircraft were converted:

- Mk I – R6722
- F Mk Vb – W3760
- Mk V – EP751 and EP754
- Mk IXb – MJ892

=== Related design projects ===
Supermarine 305: Designed to the same F.9/35 specification which led to the Boulton Paul Defiant turret fighter (and the rejected Hawker Hotspur). The basic F.37/34 (as Spitfire was still then known) wing and undercarriage were mated to a modified fuselage which provided room for a gunner and a remote control four-gun turret (originally armed with .303 Brownings, later with Lewis light machine guns.) Other modifications included a cooling system mounted in a chin radiator housing. There was no forward firing armament and dive brakes were added to the wings. Projected speed 315 mph (507 km/h) at 15,000 ft (4,572 m).

Supermarine 312: To F.37/35 for a cannon armed fighter. This was the basic Spitfire Mk I adapted to take four 20 mm Oerlikon cannon mounted in modified wings. The radiator and oil cooler were moved from under the wing to a duct under the fuselage. This was R J Mitchell's last design before his death in 1937. A separate twin engined design to the same specification was also offered. The Ministry rejected the 312 as Supermarine's design office was already too fully engaged on the Spitfire design to work on the alternative wing. The twin-engined Westland Whirlwind was accepted for the specification.

Supermarine 324, 325 and 327: These designs were for twin-engined fighters to F.18/37 (which was for the successor to the Spitfire and Hurricane) which used the same construction techniques and elliptical wing as the Spitfire. All three used tricycle undercarriage with the primary engine being a Merlin with an alternative being the Bristol Taurus. The 324 and 325 were intended to carry an armament of 12 .303 calibre Brownings in groups of six in each outer wing, while the 327 had the armament changed to six 20 mm Hispanos mounted in the wing roots. The 324 and 327 had conventional tractor engines, while the 325 had a pusher engine. Two designs from Hawker which led to the Hawker Typhoon and Hawker Tornado were selected. The Type 327 was considered for a while as it offered cannon armament but the Whirlwind, the Bristol Beaufighter and Gloster F.9/37 were already in development.

== Griffon engine variants ==
The early Spitfire variants powered by the Rolls-Royce Griffon were adaptations of Mk Vc (early Mk XII) or Mark VIII (late Mk XII and Mk XIV) airframes. The later Griffon-engined Spitfire variants embodied new wings, tail units and undercarriages and were very different from any of the earlier Spitfire marks. Griffon-engined variants are described in a separate article.

== Production ==
After the destruction of the main Itchen and Woolston works by the Luftwaffe in September 1940, all Supermarine manufactured Spitfires were built in a number of "Shadow Factories"; by the end of the war there were ten main factories and several smaller workshops which built many of the components. A more detailed explanation can be found in Supermarine Spitfire. The main Castle Bromwich factory was also aided by a smaller number of the shadow factories. As the first of the Mk IXs were converted from Mk Vcs the first true production Mk IX is listed by serial Number.

Production by Mark
Mark	Builder	Number	Notes
F VII, H.F VII	Supermarine	140	First Mk VII September 1942
F VIII, L.F VIII	Supermarine	1,658	First Mk VIII 11 November 1942
F IX, H.F IX; L.F IX	Supermarine; Castle Bromwich	5,656	First Mk IX BR581 June 1942
PR X	Supermarine	16	First Mk X May 1944
PR XI	Supermarine	471	First Mk XI November 1942
XVI	Castle Bromwich	1,054	First Mk XVI October 1944

== See also ==
- Allied technological cooperation during World War II
- Military history of the United Kingdom during World War II

Related development

- Supermarine Spitfire (early Merlin-powered variants)
- Supermarine Spitfire (Griffon-powered variants)
- Supermarine Spitfire variants: specifications, performance and armament
- Supermarine S.6B
- Seafire
- Spiteful
- Seafang
