= Malcolm Sayer =

British aircraft engineer, aerodynamisist and car designer (1916-1970)

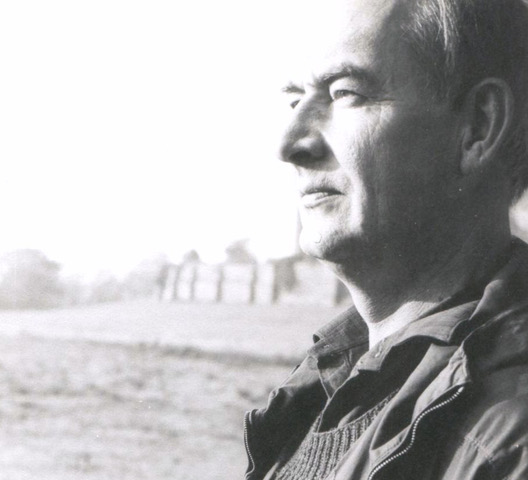
- Sayer in the mid 1960s
- Born: Malcolm Gilbert Sayer; 21 May 1916; Cromer, Norfolk, England
- Died: 22 April 1970 (aged 53); Leamington Spa, England
- Education: Loughborough College
- Occupations: Engineer, Design Director
- Notable work: E-Type Jaguar

Malcolm Gilbert Sayer (21 May 1916 – 22 April 1970) was a British aircraft engineer during wartime and later automotive aerodynamist and designer. His most notable aerodynamic work was the engineering body development and design of the E-Type Jaguar and early style guidelines for Jaguar XJS. He spent the last twenty years of his life working at Jaguar Cars and was one of the first engineers to apply principles of aircraft streamlining and aerodynamic function to cars.

== Early life and education ==
Sayer was born in Cromer, Norfolk. He was educated at Great Yarmouth Grammar School (where his father taught an unusual combination of Maths and Art). At age 17 he won the prestigious Empire Scholarship and attended at Loughborough College (later Loughborough University) in its Department of Aeronautical and Automotive Engineering, earning first class honours.

== Early career ==
He worked for the Bristol Aeroplane Company during the Second World War, which exempted him from conscription by way of reserved occupation protection.

Sayer travelled to Iraq in 1948 to work at Baghdad University where he was to establish the Faculty of Engineering, which on arrival he found not to be a realistic venture. While in Iraq he reportedly met a German professor who helped him recognise the mathematical relationship to curve shapes and identity. He worked instead maintaining the fleet of government vehicles. He returned to the UK in late 1950.

== Career at Jaguar ==
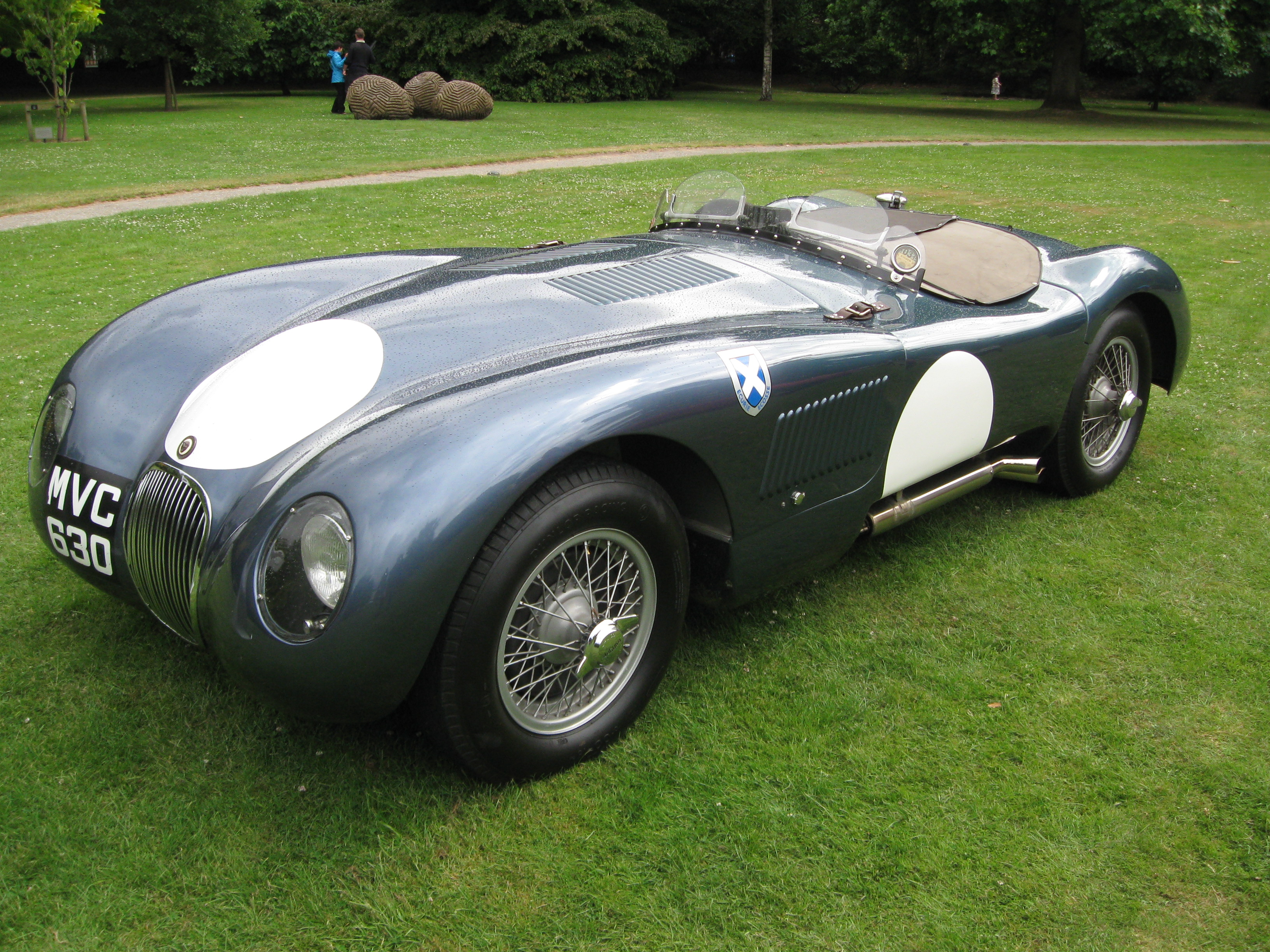
1953 Jaguar C-Type

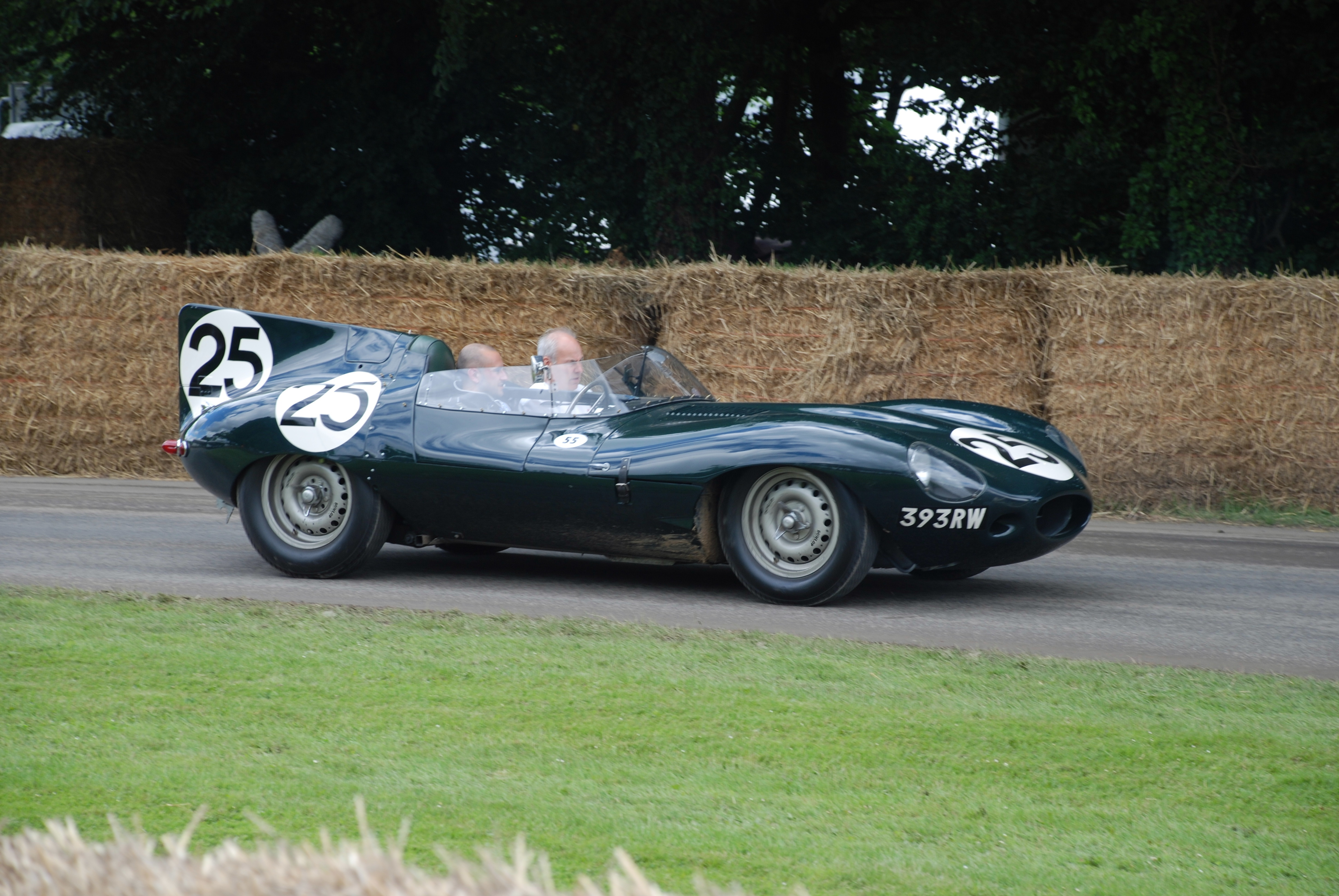
1956 Jaguar D-Type

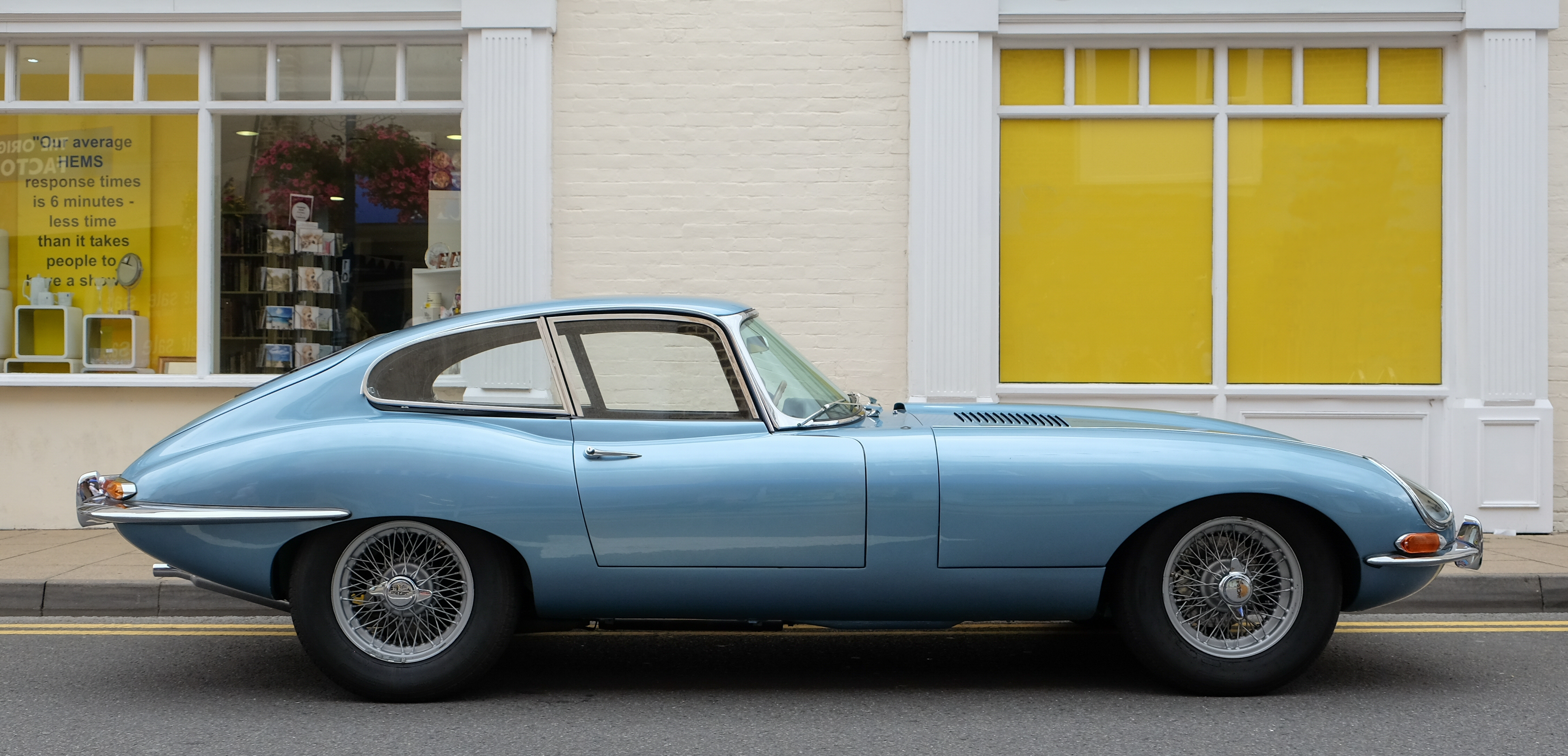
1964 Jaguar E-Type series 1 coupé

Sayer applied for an engineering position at Jaguar. He was interviewed by William Heynes (Chief Engineer (1935) and Technical Director (1946)) who recognised Sayer's aerodynamic mathematical approach, having also been involved during wartime with aircraft production and was familiar with aircraft fuselage alloy construction. Sayer started work at Jaguar Cars Engineering drawing office in early 1951. He described himself as an aerodynamicist – he loathed the term 'stylist', saying he was an aerodynamicist, not a hairdresser.

His aerodynamic work at Jaguar concentrated on racing car air flow design. He designed the competition cars during the 1950s:

- Jaguar C-Type (also called XK120-C, due to its being based on the Jaguar XK120)
- Jaguar D-Type
- Jaguar E-Type
- Jaguar XJ13 racing prototype

His prime concern was that a car body 'worked' both aerodynamically and visually. Some of his particular contributions were the introduction of slide rule and seven-figure log tables to work out formulae he invented for drawing curves, work which is now undertaken by complex Computer Aided Design software.

Sayer's first contribution for a sports racing Jaguar was successful and the C-Type won Le Mans in 1951 and 1953. (Sayer's 1952 long tail with lower frontal nose was not successful) He was responsible for the general layout, body and frame of the C-Type,. The C-Type has been lauded for its beauty and is still considered one of the world's most desirable car models.

To surpass the C-Type, Sayer worked on development of the D-Type Jaguar, initially using 1/8th scale windtunnel models tested in Loughborough and then on to full-size car tests at RAE Farnborough. The D-Type was one of the most successful racing cars of all time, winning Le Mans in 1955, 1956 and 1957. On the Mulsanne Straight, D-Type could achieve a speed of 192.4 mph (309.6 km/h).

Following the success of the D-Type, work began on one of the 'bridge' cars between D- and E-type. Later dubbed 'E1A' (the 'A' for the aluminium construct), Bill Heynes drew up specification, and during 1956 Sayer drew up first design concepts. First running in May 1957, E1A was used for extensive testing of other facets of the car including steering, brakes and suspension, and unusually was shown to a journalist and used on public roads. Scrapped in late 1959, E1A led to the next project (dubbed E2A). Initially not of much interest to Lyons, he warmed to E1A and work on 'E2A' commenced, the project led by Heynes and designed by Sayer which further showed Sayer's design bloodline from C-Type to E-Type.

The engineering team later commenced design and development in 1957 for the Jaguar E-Type which was launched to world acclaim in Geneva March 1961, the icon of 1960s motoring. A full team effort, Sayer's drawings were taken by Cyril Crouch to develop in manufacturable steel monocoque, and working closely with expert sheet metal craftsman Bob Blake, with Heynes, Bob Knight, Claude Baily, Norman Dewis and Tom Jones all playing key parts in its development. Sayer was responsible for the overall form of the car, with Lyons overseeing detailing and body engineering led by Heynes to make it suitable for manufacture. Originally designed as a roadster, the fixed head coupé was initiated and crafted by Bob Blake, an expert sheet metal craftsman who had worked closely with Sayer since joining in the late 1950s and would go on to become Jaguar's first Modelling Manager. Even today, many of the design elements associated with the E-Type Jaguar can be found on the company's cars. The long bonnet, haunches over the rear wheels and the stance are all features incorporated into Jaguar's XK8 coupe designed by the late design director Geoff Lawson, which have continued on in the current Jaguar line-up by his successor Ian Callum.

In 1965, Sayer designed the Jaguar XJ13, a mid-engined Jaguar sports racing car that was intended for competition at Le Mans. Cost constraints and a rule change at Le Mans meant the XJ-13 was never driven in international competition, but it exemplified all of the classical Sayer sophistication in aerodynamics as his earlier work. In 1971 the XJ 13 prototype was brought out of storage to help promote the new V12 E-Type when it was largely written off in a major crash. The car was rebuilt in 1972–1973 albeit with changes from the original – losing some of the classic lines in the process.

In 1967, following his work on XJ13, Sayer commenced early style proposals for an E Type replacement, later (XJ27) with modifications to evolve as the V 12-cylinder Jaguar XJS in 1975. The XJS never perhaps achieved the same iconic status as the E-Type, but it was acclaimed for its V12 performance and comfort, luxury and grandeur as a grand tourer. The XJS remained in production for 21 years (1975–1996).

== Personal life and death ==
Sayer married Pat Morgan in 1947, who also worked at Bristol Aeroplane Company. They had three children: daughter Kate (born 1948), son John (born 1953) and daughter Mary (born 1956).

He was a watercolourist and musician, playing piano, guitar and other instruments.

He suffered a fatal heart attack in Leamington Spa, one month before his 54th birthday.

== Honours and awards ==
A memorial plaque to him was unveiled at Loughborough University on 21 May 2005.

On 24 May 2008 a plaque was unveiled at his birthplace on Cromer, and another at Great Yarmouth Grammar school.

A blue plaque dedicated to him was unveiled on 28 April 2010 at Portland Place (his last address) in Leamington Spa.

A housing development in Leamington Spa was named Sayer Court after Malcolm was officially opened on 30 January 2017. The name was suggested by pupils at St Patrick's Catholic Primary School and was chosen as the winning entrant in a naming competition that was held across Leamington schools.

'Sayer Court', a new street in Leamington Spa built in 2019, was also named after Malcolm.
