= Lofty England =

British engineer, chief executive of Jaguar Cars

Frank Raymond Wilton "Lofty" England (24 August 1911, Finchley, Middlesex – 30 May 1995, Austria) was an engineer and motor company manager from Britain. He rose to fame as the manager of the Jaguar Cars sports car racing team in the 1950s, during which time Jaguar cars won the prestigious 24 Hours of Le Mans race on five occasions. After the company's withdrawal from racing England moved into the mainstream management of Jaguar Cars, later succeeding Sir William Lyons as its chairman and Chief Executive, before retiring in 1974.

== Early life ==
Frank England was born in Finchley, Middlesex, and found an aptitude and interest in motor engineering during his schooling at Christ's College. At the age of 14 the England family moved to Edgware. Here the young Frank was able to watch Bentley chassis, built in nearby Cricklewood, being tested along the long, straight A5 road, formerly part of the Roman road of Watling Street.

England was apprenticed as an engineer to the Daimler Company in 1927 where, owing to his 6 ft 5 in (196 cm) height, he quickly acquired the nickname, "Lofty", which would stick with him for the rest of his life. Daimler had not been England's first choice; his early experiences had led him originally to apply to Bentley, but without success. During his five-year apprenticeship Lofty England also made his first appearances in motorsport. In 1932, his final year as an apprentice, England finished second in the inaugural RAC Rally, driving one of Laurence Pomeroy's Daimler Double Six cars. Being based in Hendon also meant that England could easily attend race meetings at the Brooklands circuit in Surrey, and he became a familiar face at the Track.

== England the race engineer ==
On completing his apprenticeship Lofty England found that his technical skills, allied to his motorsport enthusiasm, meant that he was in great demand among the gentlemen racers of the early 1930s. His first employer was 1931 Le Mans winner "Tim" Birkin. Under Charles Newcombe, England developed Birkin's Blower Bentley cars at his Welwyn Garden City workshop. Although Birkin took the lap record at Brooklands, at over 137 mph, the car was not a success, and following Birkin's death in 1933 the Blower Bentley project folded.

Both England and Newcombe transferred to American Whitney Straight's new motor racing team in 1934, where results began to flow immediately. The team was extremely well financed – Straight was head of Straight Corporation Ltd., an early service provider in the booming aeronautical sector – and could afford for his Maserati 8C to be serviced at the Maserati factory in Italy, accompanied by England. Straight and his team not only raised the Brooklands lap record for 5-litre cars to over 138 mph, but Straight also won the inaugural South African Grand Prix in 1934. However, following Straight's marriage in 1935 the team was wound up and Lofty England found himself out of work once again.

A brief spell at ERA was punctuated with spells working for Alvis, before Raymond Mays fired him in 1936. His time at ERA was not happy, mainly due to the works' lax attitude toward their customers' cars, but he was employed by Dick Seaman almost immediately following his ignominious exit. Unfortunately for England, what may have proved to be a productive relationship with the up-and-coming Grand Prix star was curtailed in late 1936 when Seaman signed for the dominant Mercedes-Benz racing team. When Seaman's Delage was sold to Siamese princes Chula and Bira, England moved with it.

Prince Chula ran the cousins' White Mouse Stable racing team with efficiency and organisation, a pattern that England would come to model his own teams on. During nearly two years with the aristocratic pair, England's ERA experience meant that R2B Romulus and R5B Remus were always immaculately prepared and, along with the team's more modern Maserati, provided B. Bira (Prince Bira's nom de course) with many race wins both in the UK and throughout Europe. Although the initial intention had been to rebuild Seaman's Delage, England was fully occupied with the operational race cars and the project was abandoned.

Throughout his time as a race engineer Lofty England maintained his own active motorsport career. An early gift of a Douglas motorcycle from his father had started him on a successful motorcycle racing path. His best result was second place in the 1936 Manx Grand Prix.

In 1938 England moved out of racing for the first time, taking a job back with Alvis, but this time at the Coventry company's headquarters. He rapidly rose from service engineer to become superintendent of the service department by the outbreak of the Second World War. This was Lofty England's first experience of management responsibility, and as a reserved occupation he remained with Alvis, now a military contractor, for the first two years of conflict. However, in 1941 England volunteered for pilot training and qualified as a bomber pilot, probably excluded from fighter pilot postings due to his height. He served as a training instructor to the USAAF in Texas until 1943, when he returned to the RAF for active service flying Avro Lancasters.

== Post-war Jaguar motorsport ==
After demobilisation in 1945 Lofty England briefly moved back to Alvis, but the company had been badly affected by wartime bombing raids and through close friend Walter Hassan he secured a move to fellow Coventry firm Jaguar Cars in early 1946. He initially joined Jaguar in the same role that he had filled at Alvis, that of service manager. The company did not have any motorsport plans at this stage, but in the hands of a few privateer owner-drivers Jaguar's new XK120, introduced in 1948, proved to be competitive with the more specialised offerings from continental manufacturers.

=== 1949–1952: The XK120 era ===
William Heynes' straight-6 XK engine proved eminently tunable and Heynes and England were quick to see the potential benefits of a works motorsport effort. Jaguar's newly formed Engineering Competition Department provided six top pre-war drivers (including England's old employer Prince Bira) with lightweight, pre-production, aluminium-bodied XK120s in 1949, and results were encouraging. Leslie Johnson won major sports car races in Britain and America that year and took fifth in the 1950 Mille Miglia, the Jaguar beaten only by works Ferraris and Alfa Romeos. At the 1950 24 Hours of Le Mans Johnson and Bert Hadley ran as high as second before mechanical failure forced them out when lying third near the end, while other XK120s finished 12th and 15th.

Stirling Moss drove another of the pre-production cars, entered by Tommy Wisdom, to a dominant victory in the 1950 Dundrod TT, his speed in the rain also winning him a place in Jaguar's 1951 Le Mans team. Works-prepared XK120s won numerous other events including the Tulip Rally in 1950 and the Alpine Rally in 1950, 1951 and 1952.

In 1952 Lofty England and several factory mechanics supported a high-speed endurance run at Linas-Montlhéry, where Johnson, Moss, Hadley and Jack Fairman drove a works-modified XK120 coupé, the personal car of William Heynes, at an average of just over 100 mph for seven days and nights to break nine speed and endurance records.

=== 1951–1953: The C-Type era ===
While results continued to come with the production XK120 model, England and Heynes realised that it was too overweight and aerodynamically compromised to have a serious chance of winning the Le Mans race. Their solution was to take the drivetrain from the XK120 and to install it in a lightweight chassis. William Heynes developed a new design with a new frame chassis and new bodywork with air flow shape developed by aerodynamist Malcolm Sayer. The XK120C (for competition), later known as the C-Type, made its debut at the 1951 Le Mans race.

Lofty England's racing experience and sharp strategic thinking required that Moss and co-driver Jack Fairman act as a "hare", driving hard from the start to draw other cars into chasing it in the hope that their cars would fail. The strategy worked almost entirely as planned. Moss posted a new lap record of 105.232 mph before the lead Jaguar failed after 92 laps. However, the failure of the Ferrari and Talbot-Lago competition by this time allowed Peter Walker and Peter Whitehead's car to inherit the lead, which by the end of the 24 hours they had extended to nine laps. Lofty England's debutant team had scored a striking victory over 19 cars with engines larger than the C-Type's, but more was to come.

The 1952 event was nowhere near as successful, as modifications made to the bodywork caused overheating and all three works cars failed before an hour had elapsed. However, for 1953 England's Jaguars were back at La Sarthe with improved engines, the original bodywork, and innovative all-wheel disc brakes. On this occasion the team scored another victory, improved reliability allowing the green cars to take second and fourth places as well.

Lofty England's contribution to the C-Type's success was crucial. Taking a lead from Alfred Neubauer's running of the pre-war Mercedes team, he ran the Jaguar squad always with an eye for the greater good of Jaguar, rather than the individual demands of any one driver. The 1953 Le Mans event was a case in point, as the Jaguar cars were initially excluded for a technical infringement. The eventual winning driver pairing of Duncan Hamilton and Tony Rolt headed to a bar expecting that they wouldn't race that night, while Lofty England took matters in hand and managed to persuade the Automobile Club de l'Ouest to reinstate the cars. It was rumored that unfortunately for England, his drivers were drunk and it took all of England's managerial and motivational talents to get them into the car for the start. England and Rolt both later denied that the drivers had been drunk at the time.

=== 1954–1957: The D-Type era ===
For 1954 Lofty England decided that Jaguar had taken the C-Type as far is they could, and a new car was designed around the successful XK engine. Appropriately, the iconic D-Type made its debut at the 1954 24 Hours of Le Mans race, where Hamilton and Rolt were beaten into second place by only one lap, by the Ferrari 375 of Formula One stars José Froilán González and Maurice Trintignant. The 1955 event was poised to be a direct contest between England's Jaguars, and the Mercedes team of Alfred Neubauer. an accident triggered by the D-Type of Mike Hawthorn caused the deaths of Mercedes driver Pierre Levegh and 83 spectators, plus injuring 120 others. Neubauer's team were withdrawn from the race some hours later and invited Jaguar to share the gesture, but England decided to keep the Jaguars running.

Lofty England attracted some criticism for his decision to continue the race. However, England maintained for the rest of his life that he did not regard Hawthorn as being responsible for the tragedy, and therefore the team had no reason to withdraw. The decision was typical of the unsentimental, hard-nosed manner in which Lofty England ran the team, demanding complete loyalty and adherence to the team principle from his drivers. When, at Reims in early 1956, Le Mans hero Duncan Hamilton ignored England's pit signals, the team manager fired him on the spot.

The 1956 24 Hours of Le Mans was to be the last outing for the works Jaguar team. However, there was to be no swansong for Lofty England's squad. The new longnose D-Type variant could only manage sixth place. Fortunately for Jaguar, Lofty England had always encouraged privateer teams and ensured that serious contenders received as much help as the works could offer, and it was one of these teams, Ecurie Ecosse which scored the D-Type's victory that year. The Scottish team would also go on to win the race with an England-supplied, ex-works longnose car the following year. England also ensured that Jaguar's name remained prominent in motorsport by providing support for both privateer entrants of Jaguar cars, and for Jaguar-engined specials built by the likes of Lister and John Tojeiro.

England's hope of helping Jaguar return to Le Mans in 1966 with the Jaguar XJ13 unfortunately came to nought and the one-and-only Le Mans Prototype was destined to never race.

== Jaguar management career ==
Immediately following Jaguar's withdrawal from racing Lofty England returned to his role as director of the Jaguar service department. In 1958 Tony Vandervell offered to sell England the Vanwall Formula One team, after the death of Vandervell's protégé Stuart Lewis-Evans during the 1958 Moroccan Grand Prix. England refused the offer and was never directly involved in motorsport again.

Instead, Lofty England began to climb the corporate ladder within Jaguar. England's alma mater, Daimler, merged with Jaguar in 1960, and in 1961 Lofty England joined the Jaguar board as assistant managing director. During the following five years he was heavily involved in the negotiations which resulted in the merger of Jaguar with BMC to form British Motor Holdings in 1966. At the end of 1967, on the retirement from the managing directorship of Sir William Lyons, Lofty England and William Heynes succeeded him as joint managing directors of the company. In turn, BMH merged with Leyland Motors in 1968 to form the British Leyland Motor Corporation.

In between the management upheaval, Lofty England invited back old friend Walter Hassan to develop Jaguar's XJ V12 engine. The engine made its debut in the Series III version of Jaguar's ageing E-Type in 1971, one year before Lofty England succeeded William Lyons as chairman and Chief Executive of Jaguar Cars. It was during his time as CEO that England had to negotiate with the unions to ensure that the car the V12 was built for, the V12 version of the Jaguar XJ saloon, was not delayed into production. Reflecting his own previous success and the Daimler company history, England decided that the Daimler version of the V12 should be called the Double Six. With increasing industrial tensions and centralised decision making within British Leyland, England felt that his position was untenable and, aged 63, he retired to Austria in 1974.

== Post-retirement ==
During his time at Jaguar, Frank "Lofty" England was probably second only to Sir William Lyons himself in determining the corporate direction and public image of Jaguar Cars. Following his retirement, although he had no direct involvement with the company, England always maintained an interest in Jaguar's fortunes.

After moving to Austria during retirement, England became a consultant to Reliant Motor Company of Tamworth, Staffordshire, UK. The company wished to establish a European distribution network for its Scimitar GTE sports estate car following the development of its more refined SE6 version in 1986. England was successful in assisting Reliant to appoint importers and distributors in Austria, Belgium, the Netherlands and Switzerland.

England died on 30 May 1995 at the age of 83.
