= Jaguar XJ13 =

Prototype racing car

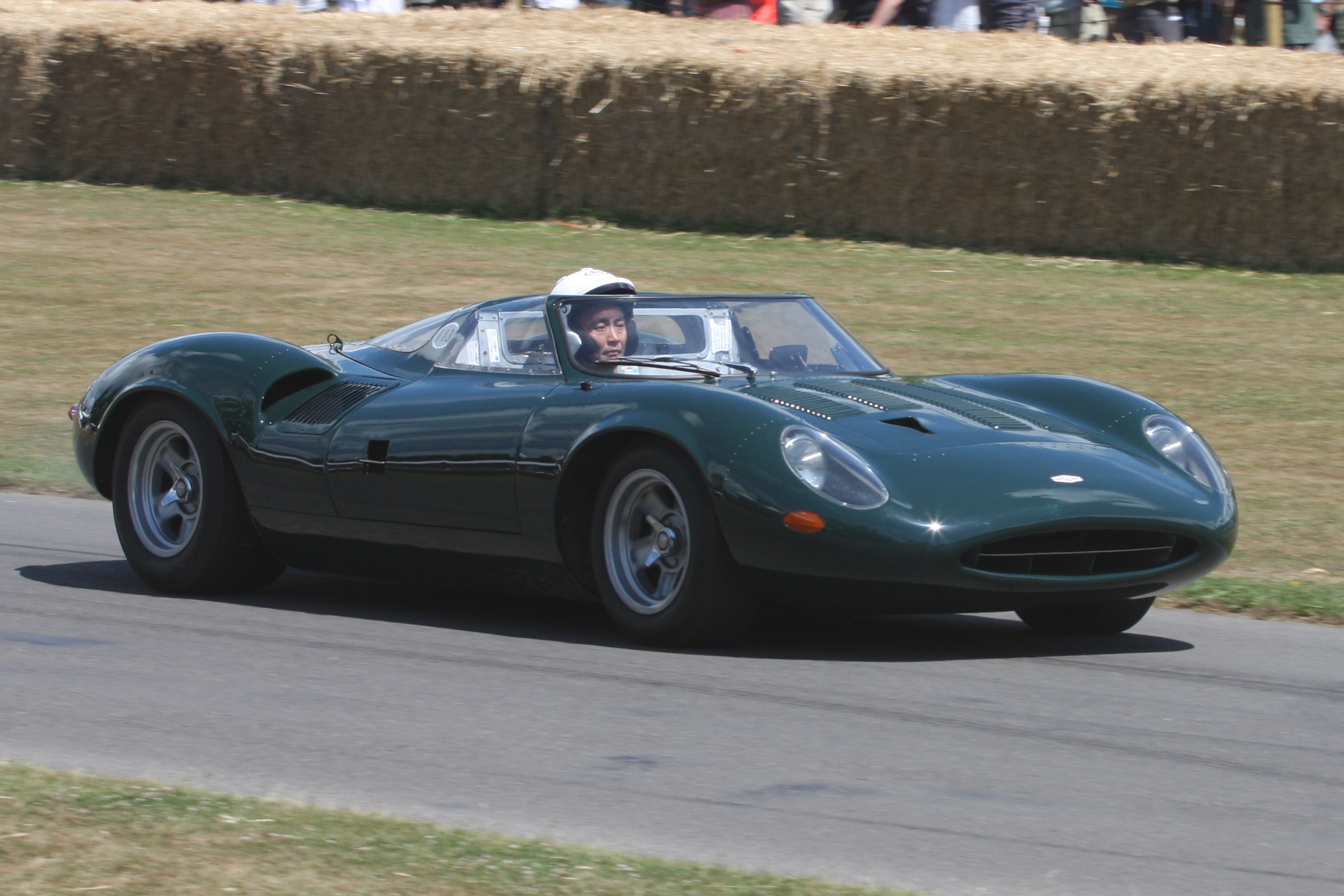
- The Jaguar XJ13 driven by Kazunori Yamauchi, producer of Gran Turismo racing game franchise at Goodwood Festival of Speed in 2009.

Overview
- Manufacturer: Jaguar Cars
- Production: 1966 (1 produced)
- Assembly: United Kingdom: Coventry
- Designer: Malcolm Sayer

Body and chassis
- Class: Race car
- Body style: 2-door Roadster
- Layout: Rear mid-engine, rear-wheel-drive

Powertrain
- Engine: 5.0 L DOHC 60 Degree V12
- Transmission: 5-speed ZF 5DS/25 manual

Dimensions
- Wheelbase: 2,410 mm (95 in)
- Length: 4,810 mm (189 in)
- Width: 1,800 mm (71 in)
- Height: 1,000 mm (39 in)
- Kerb weight: 998 kg (2,200 lb)

Chronology
- Predecessor: Jaguar D-Type
- Successor: Jaguar XJR-5

Jaguar XJ13
Jaguar XJ13 at Goodwood Festival of Speed 2009

The Jaguar XJ13 is a prototype racing car that was developed by Jaguar Engineering Director William Heynes to compete at Le Mans in the mid 1960s. It never raced, and only one was produced.

== Development ==
Jaguar had considered the manufacture of a Dual Overhead Camshaft (DOHC) V12 engine as far back as 1950, initially for racing purposes, and then developing a Single Overhead Camshaft (SOHC) road-going version, unlike the XK, which was designed as a production engine and later pressed into service for racing. The engine design was essentially two XK 6-cylinder engines on a common crankshaft with an aluminium cylinder block, although there were differences in the inlet porting, valve angles and combustion chamber shape. The first engine ran in July 1964.

The design structure of a mid-engined prototype was first mooted in 1960 by William Heynes, but it was not until 1965 that construction began, with the first car running by March 1966. The aluminium body exterior was designed by Malcolm Sayer, the aerodynamicist responsible for aerodynamic air flow work on the Jaguar C-type and D-type. He used his Bristol Aeroplane Company background to build it using techniques borrowed from the aircraft industry. The task of building the car was entrusted by Heynes to Engineer Derick White, Ted Brookes, Mike Kimberley, and Bob Blake in the Browns Lane experimental department's "competition shop"—Blake described by his contemporaries as "An Artist in Metal". William Heynes recognised as early as 1964 that a car such as the XJ13 needed an experienced race driver to help develop it. Jack Brabham was approached in this regard, but the challenge was eventually taken up by ex-Jaguar Apprentice David Hobbs, who was recruited as the XJ13's main test driver. In 1969, Hobbs was included in a FIA list of 27 drivers who were rated the best in the world. Hobbs achieved an unofficial UK closed lap record with the XJ13 which stood for 32 years. For the XJ13's final test at full racing speed, Hobbs was joined at Silverstone by another racing driver (and ex-Jaguar apprentice) Richard Attwood.

The XJ13 had a mid-engine format, with the 5.0 litre V12 engine designed by Heynes and Claude Bailey. It produces 502 horsepower at 7600 rpm, mounted behind the driver, used as a stressed chassis member together with the five-speed manual ZF Transaxle driving the rear wheels.

The front suspension wishbones were similar to that of the E-Type; however, where the E-Type used longitudinal torsion bars, the XJ13 had more conventional coil spring/damper units. At the rear, there again remained similarities with the E-Type—the use of driveshafts as upper transverse links. However, the rest was different, with two long radius arms per side angling back from the central body tub together with a single fabricated transverse lower link.

The development of the XJ13, although treated seriously by the designers, was never a priority for company management (despite assistant MD Lofty England's Le Mans success in the 1950s) and became less so following the 1966 merger with BMC. By that time, Ford had developed the GT40 into the 7.0 litre Mk.II prototype that won Le Mans in 1966, and so the XJ13 was considered obsolete by the time the prototype was complete. In addition, Ford upgraded the chassis to the modern Mk.IV, winner of 1967 Le Mans. Together with the 4.0 litre V12 Ferrari P these sleek cars were so fast that from 1968 onwards the engines of prototypes were limited to 3.0 litre, like in Formula One since 1966.

The XJ13 prototype was tested at MIRA and at Silverstone, which confirmed that it would have required considerable development to make it competitive. The prototype was put into storage and no further examples were made - one reason may have been that there was a literal flood of V12 race cars available on the market. Porsche and Ferrari brought 5.0 litre V12 engine to sports car racing when this was allowed after at least 25 near-identical "sports cars" had been produced for the civilian market. (Although rather obviously these de facto were prototypes built for the sole purpose of allowing the car in full race trim to enter Le Mans.) Porsche made this expensive gamble in 1969, building 25 Porsche 917 (and later many more), Ferrari sold half of its company to FIAT in order to answer with the Ferrari 512S in 1970, of which not all 25 were raced or sold.

== MIRA crash ==
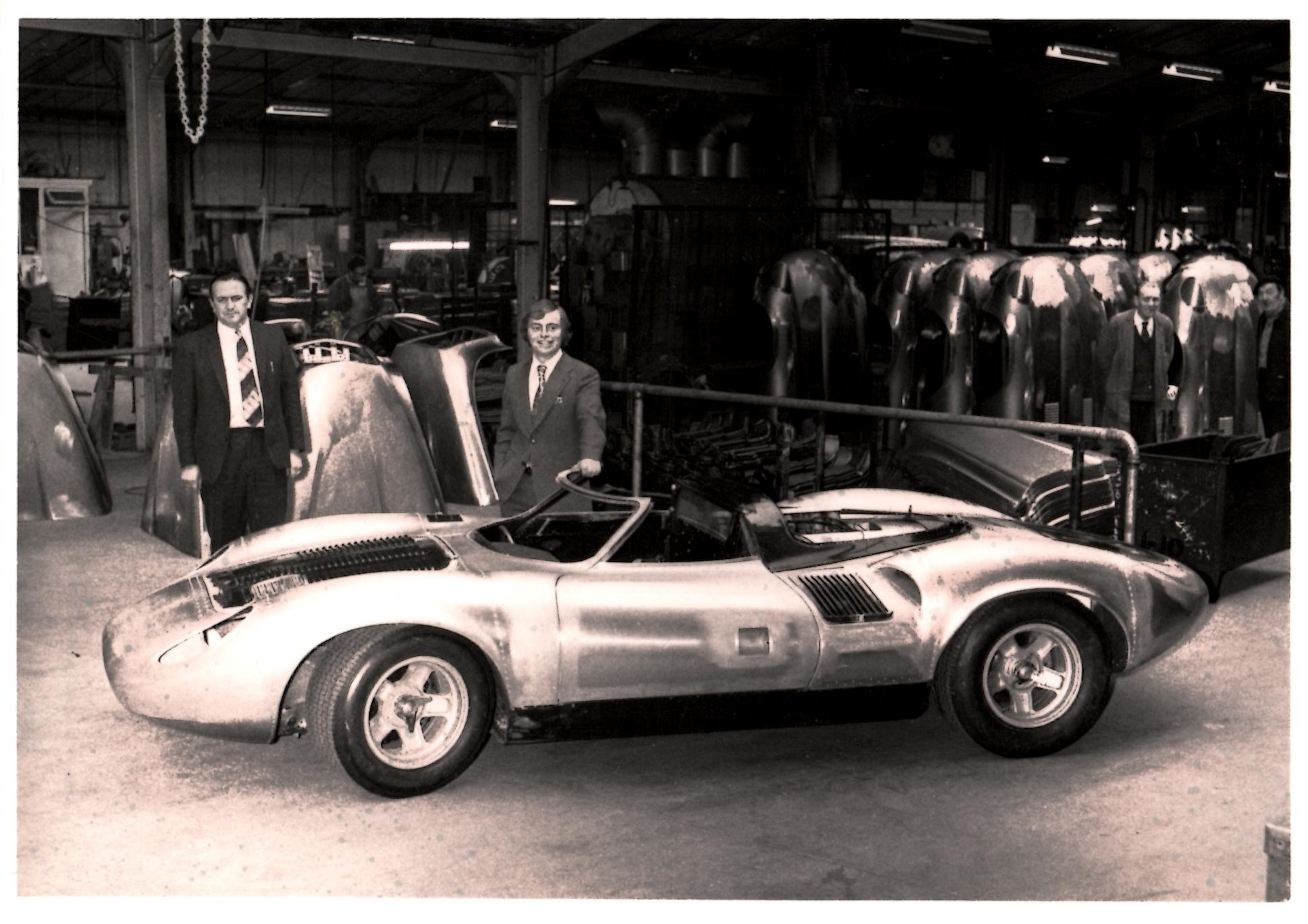
Jaguar XJ13 during assembly at Abbey Panels after the MIRA crash

In 1971 the Series 3 E-type was about to be launched with Jaguar's first production V12 engine. The publicity team wanted a shot of the XJ13 at speed for the opening sequence of the film launching the V12 E-Type. On 21 January 1971, the XJ13 was taken to MIRA for the filming with Jaguar test driver Norman Dewis at the wheel. The car was driven by Dewis at speed on a damaged tyre, against the instructions of Jaguar director England. The resultant crash heavily damaged and nearly destroyed the car, although Dewis was unharmed. The damaged car was put back into storage.

Some years later, Edward Loades spotted the crashed XJ13 in storage at Jaguar and made the offer to 'Lofty' England that his company Abbey Panels should rebuild the car. The car was rebuilt, to a specification similar to the original, using some of the body jigs made for its original construction and at a cost of £1,000 to Jaguar. In Jaguar's own words, "The car that can be seen today is not an exact reproduction of the original." The XJ13 made its public debut in July 1973 when 'Lofty' drove it around Silverstone at the British Grand Prix meeting. It is now displayed at the British Motor Museum at Gaydon, UK.

== Replicas ==
The only known replicas of the original, pre MIRA crash, car powered by original prototype engine:

=== Building the Legend Ltd ===
Created following extensive research, including at the Jaguar Heritage Trust, under the guidance of surviving XJ13 Team members and making use of original data. Research was conducted by Neville Swales, owner of Building the Legend Ltd. Generally accepted as being authentic re-creations of the pre-crash 1966 Jaguar XJ13.

Two of these Building The Legend replicas are notable for being powered by two of the five surviving original quad-cam prototype engines.

Notable appearances:

First original prototype-engined car - February 2016: London Classic Car show. followed by its first track appearance, in the company of surviving members of the original XJ13 project team, and members of William Heynes' and Malcolm Sayer's family, Jaguar VIPs and enthusiasts at Curborough Sprint Course near Lichfield. This same car was nominated as a finalist in the International Historic Motoring Awards 2016 in the category Car of the Year and was displayed outside the awards event at The Guildhall in London that same year.

22 January 2024: A SOHC-powered Building The Legend XJ13 was featured and reviewed on an episode of Jay Leno's Garage.

15 August 2025: The second Building The Legend original prototype-engined car was displayed at The Quail, California.

Known replicas of the rebuilt, post MIRA crash, car:

- The True Spirit of XJ13, by JD Classics. The only car ever built from a physical scan of the 'factory' Jaguar XJ13. A very special one-off build - handmade by some of the finest craftsmen in the industry. A replica of the post-crash 1973-built factory car. The car was officially launched at Retromobile 2024.
- Proteus XJ13-inspired coupé
- Charles Motors Ltd replica
- The Sports Car Factory / TWRR

== Gallery ==
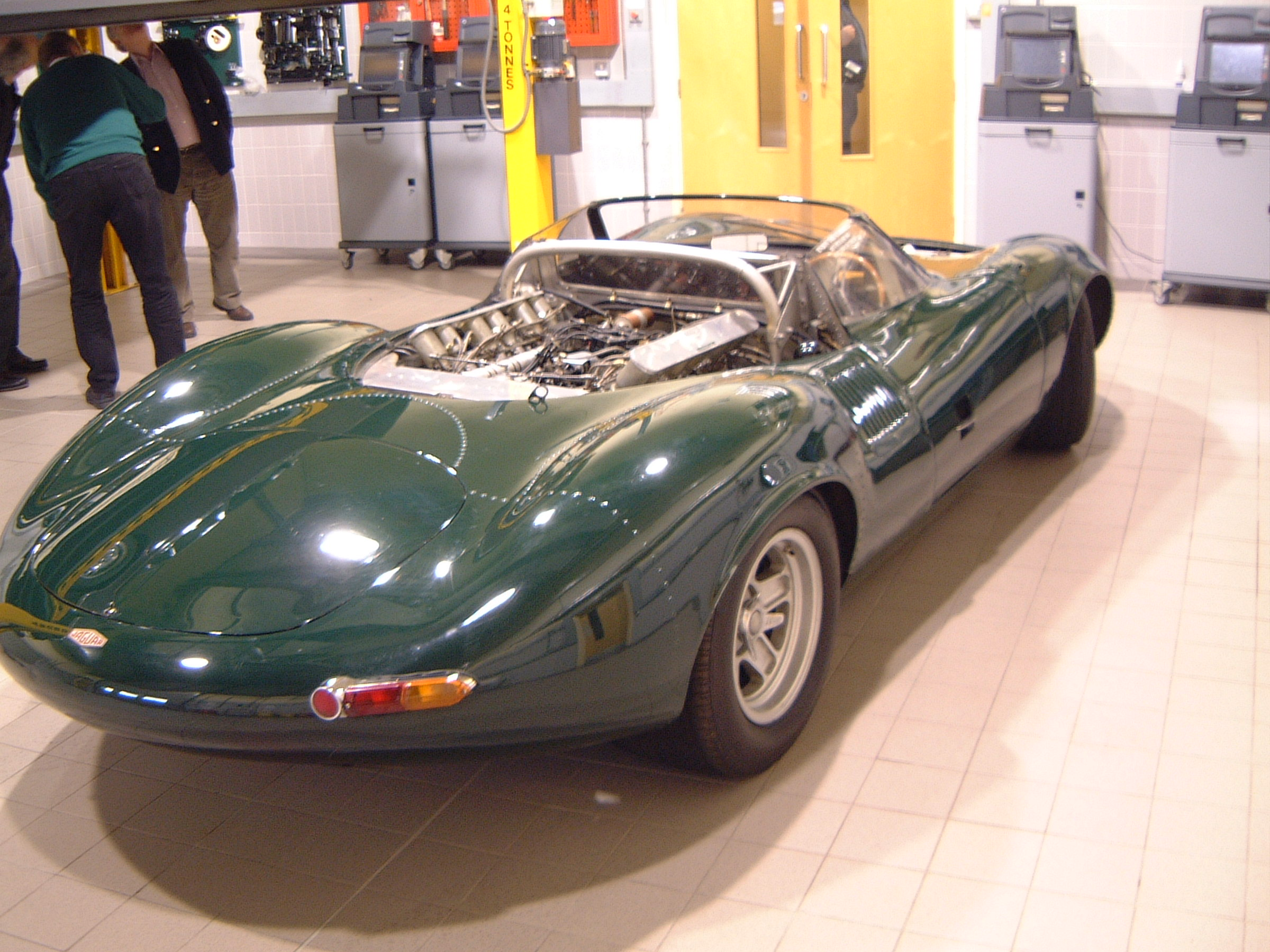

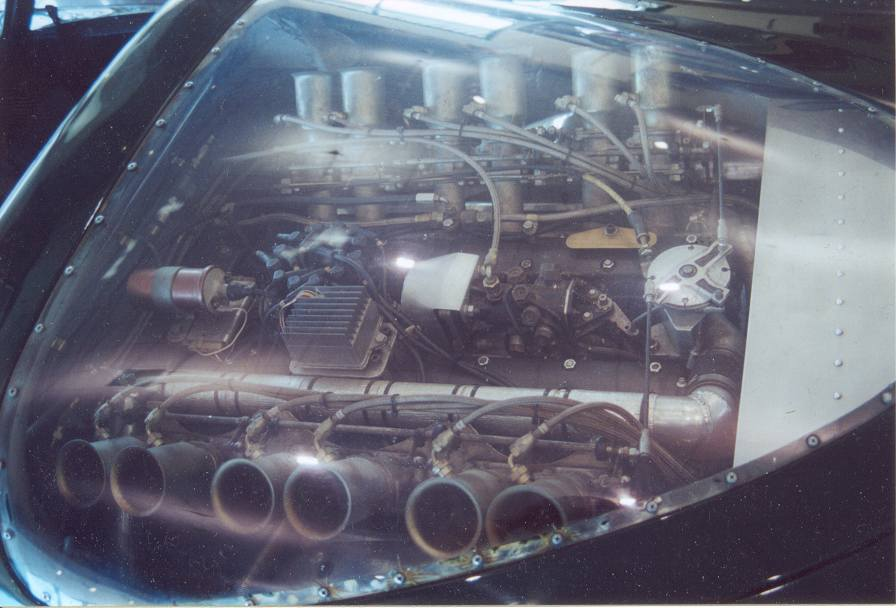

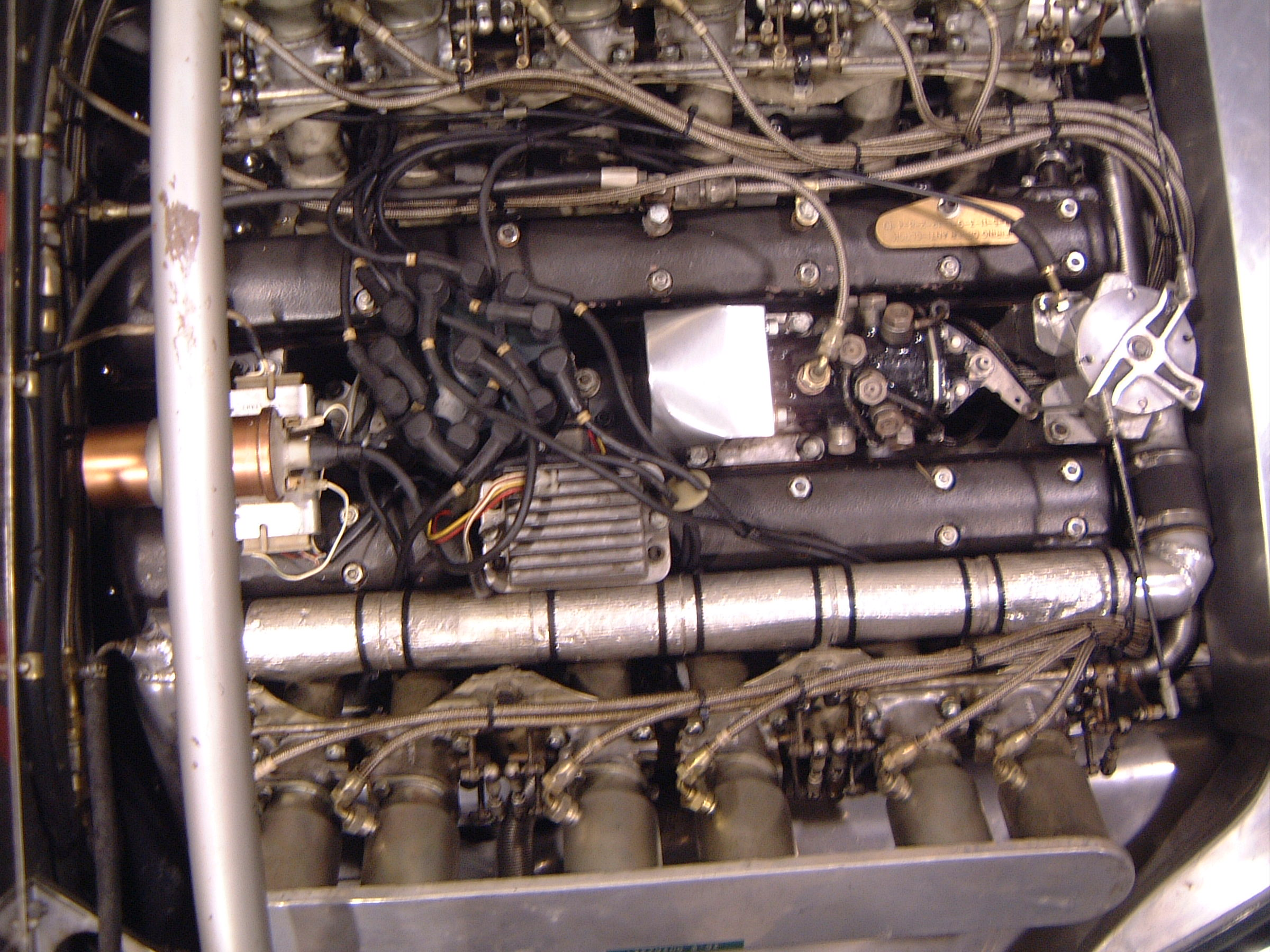

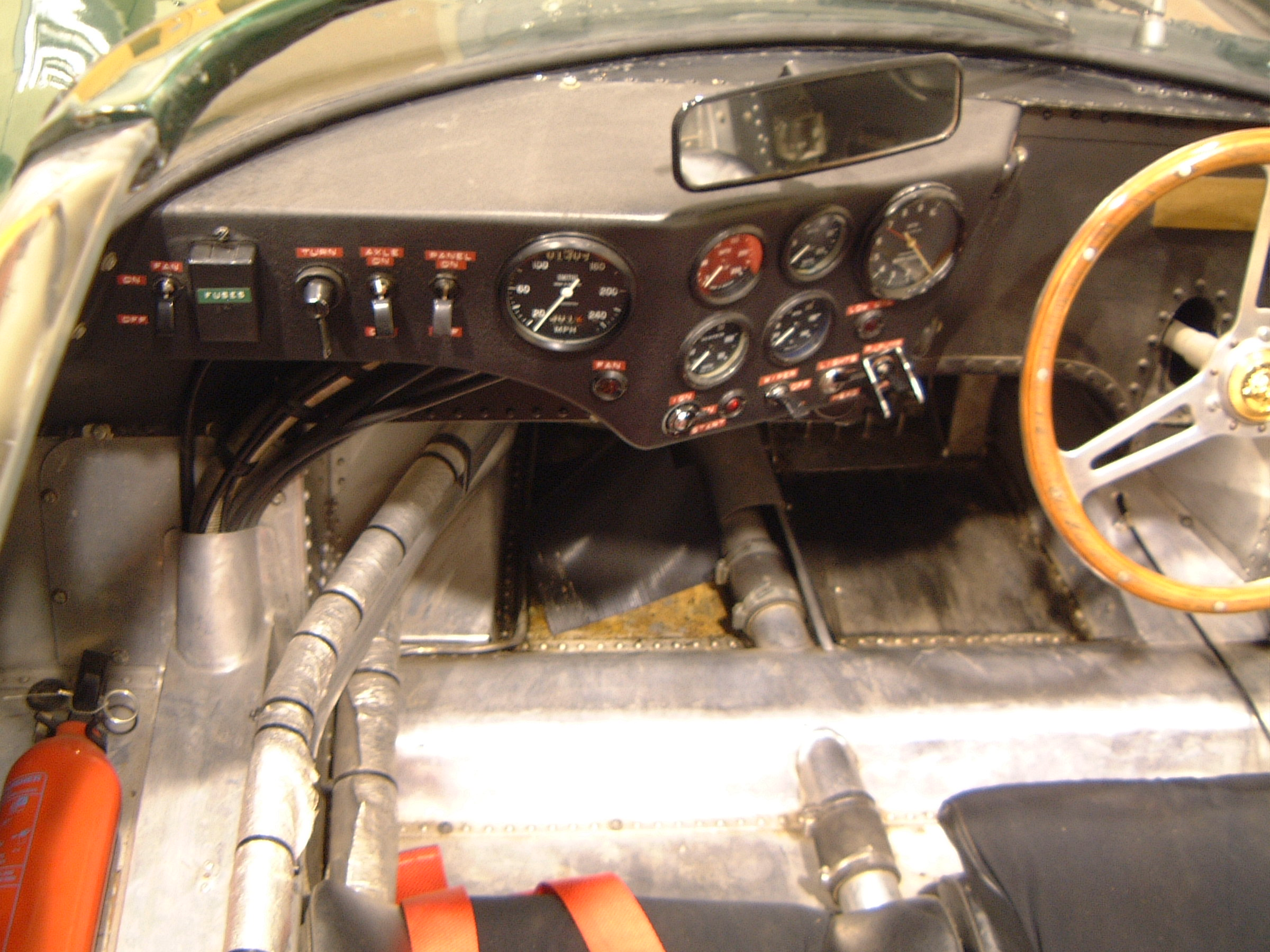

== See also ==
- Ecurie Ecosse LM69, a 2019 retro-styled homage to the XJ13
