= Harry Mundy =

British automotive engineer (1916–1988)

Harry Mundy (1915–1988) was a British car engine designer and motoring magazine editor.

== Education and career ==
He was educated at King Henry VIII School in Coventry and went on to serve his apprenticeship with Alvis. He left them in 1936 to join English Racing Automobiles (ERA) in Bourne, Lincolnshire as a draughtsman. Also at ERA was Walter Hassan who became a lifelong friend; the two would work together later at Jaguar on engine development.

He left ERA in 1939 and returned to Coventry to work at the Morris Engines factory.

After World War II he moved to British Racing Motors (BRM) in 1946 as head of the design office, being involved in the design of the BRM V16 Formula One engine, before moving on again in 1950 to Coventry Climax engines as chief designer working on the FWA engine.

His career then took a change in direction and he moved into journalism becoming Technical Editor of The Autocar magazine in 1955 but while there he also worked on the design of the Ford based twin-cam engine for Lotus.

However, following Jaguar's purchase of Coventry Climax in 1963, Hassan persuaded Mundy to return to engineering where, with William Heynes, they developed the Jaguar V12 engine.

Harry Mundy stayed with Jaguar until his retirement in 1980, after which he still did some consultancy work.
