= Norman Dewis =

British racing driver (1920–2019)

Norman Dewis OBE
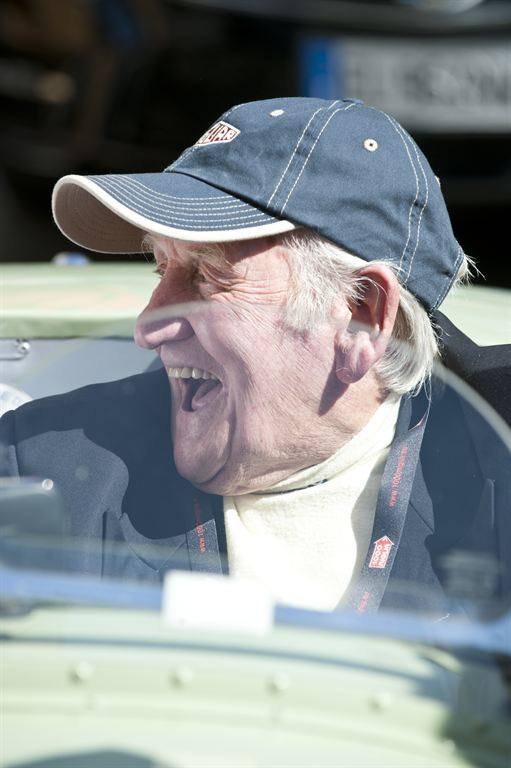
- Norman Dewis at the 2012 Mille Miglia.
- Born: 3 August 1920; Coventry, Warwickshire, England
- Died: 8 June 2019 (aged 98)
- Occupations: Chief test driver and development engineer
- Children: 2

Norman Dewis OBE (3 August 1920 – 8 June 2019) was a British car test driver. He worked for Lea-Francis as a test driver from 1946 to 1951 then for Jaguar Cars from 1952 to 1985.

== Car development ==
Dewis participated in the development of the following cars:

- Lea-Francis 14 hp and 2½ models
- Jaguar XK140
- Jaguar XK150
- Jaguar C-type
- Jaguar D-type
- Jaguar Mark VIII
- Jaguar Mark IX
- Jaguar Mark II
- Jaguar E-type
- Jaguar XJ13
- Jaguar Mark X
- Jaguar XJ6
- Jaguar XJ-S
- Jaguar XJ40

== Racing career ==
Dewis drove a Jaguar D-Type in the 1955 24 Hours of Le Mans, with Don Beauman. The car failed to finish the race, retiring 106 laps into the race.

== Jabbeke XK120 record ==
Dewis was the test driver who, on 20 October 1953 at Jabbeke, Belgium, drove a Jaguar XK120 to 172.412 mph, a record for production cars. The car had several aerodynamic modifications, including a distinctive bubble-shaped, air-tight canopy from a glider aircraft. After the record run the Jaguar XK120 was converted back to a road car and sold by the company.

== XJ13 crash ==
On 21 January 1971 at the MIRA high-speed circuit Dewis drove the only Jaguar XJ13 for a film promoting the new V12 Jaguar E-type. Despite a damaged tyre, and against the instructions of Jaguar Director, Lofty England, the car was driven by Dewis at high speed. The tyre failed and the car crashed heavily, almost destroying it. Dewis was unharmed. The wreck of the car was put back into storage.

== Work for Jaguar in retirement ==
In 2014 Dewis was still attending events related to Jaguar and giving talks about his work for the company. In June 2016 he appeared on the BBC's Top Gear TV show with the Jaguar F-type SVR.

Norman was also a supporter of Jaguar owners and the social scene around owning a car. He was a regular attendee at many of the events held by the Jaguar Drivers' Club, the only Jaguar owners club to be officially recognised by Sir William Lyons and Jaguar as a company.

== Honours ==
In the 2015 New Year Honours Dewis was invested as an Officer of the Most Excellent Order of the British Empire (OBE) for services to the Motor Industry.
