= Ecurie Ecosse LM69 =

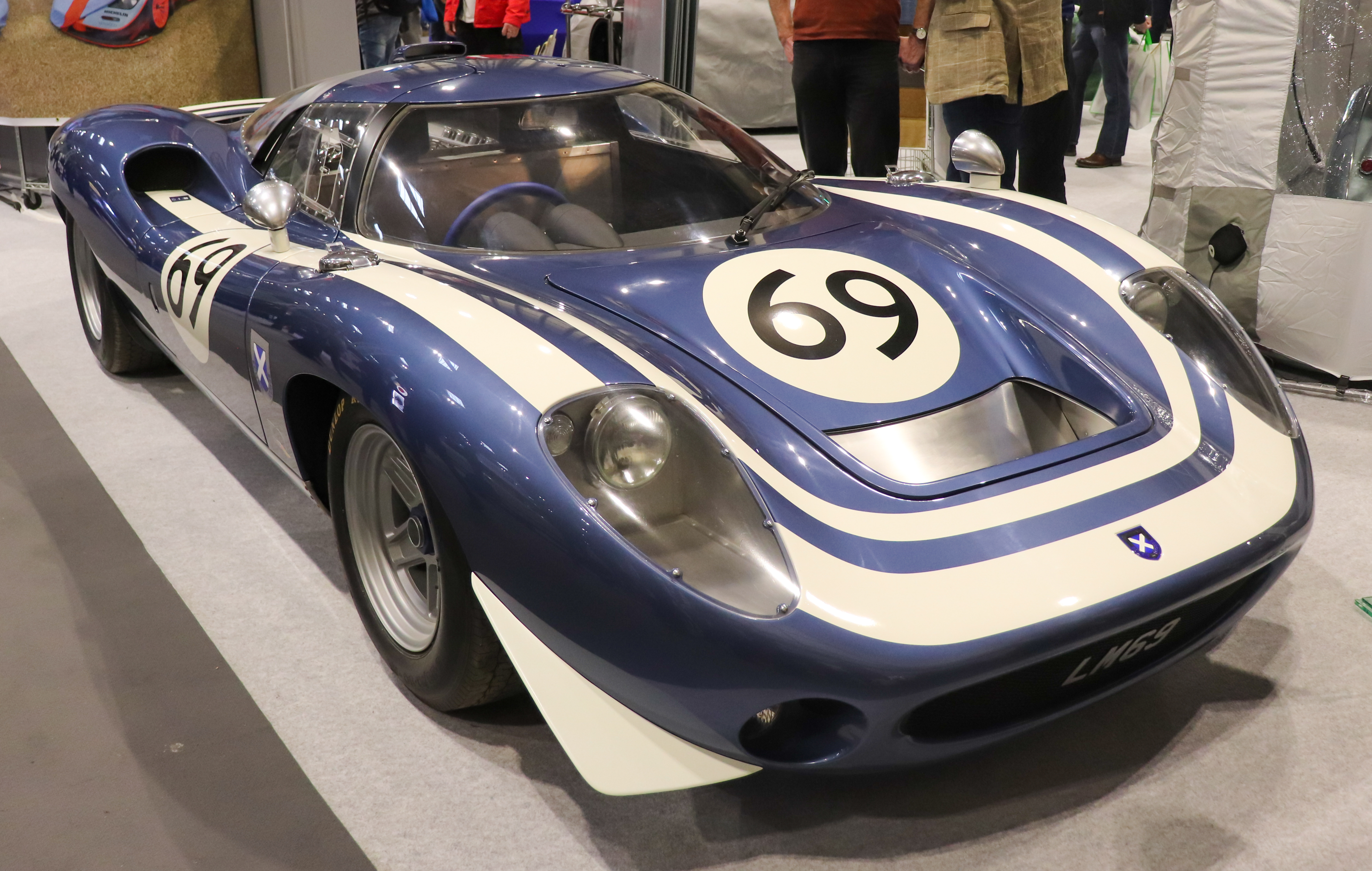
- The LM69 at the NEC Classic Motor Show 2019

Overview
- Manufacturer: Ecurie Cars Ltd
- Production: TBA;

Body and chassis
- Class: Sports car
- Body style: 2-door coupé
- Layout: MR
- Related: Jaguar XJ13

Powertrain
- Engine: 6.1 or 6.8 L tera V12 (by Building The Legend Limited)
- Transmission: 5-speed manual

The Ecurie Ecosse LM69 is a sports car manufactured by Ecurie Cars Ltd - a Joint Venture between Building The Legend, Ecurie Ecosse & Design Q. The car is meant to be both a tribute to the Jaguar XJ13 and a race car built in compliance with the 1969 Le Mans regulations.

== Concept ==
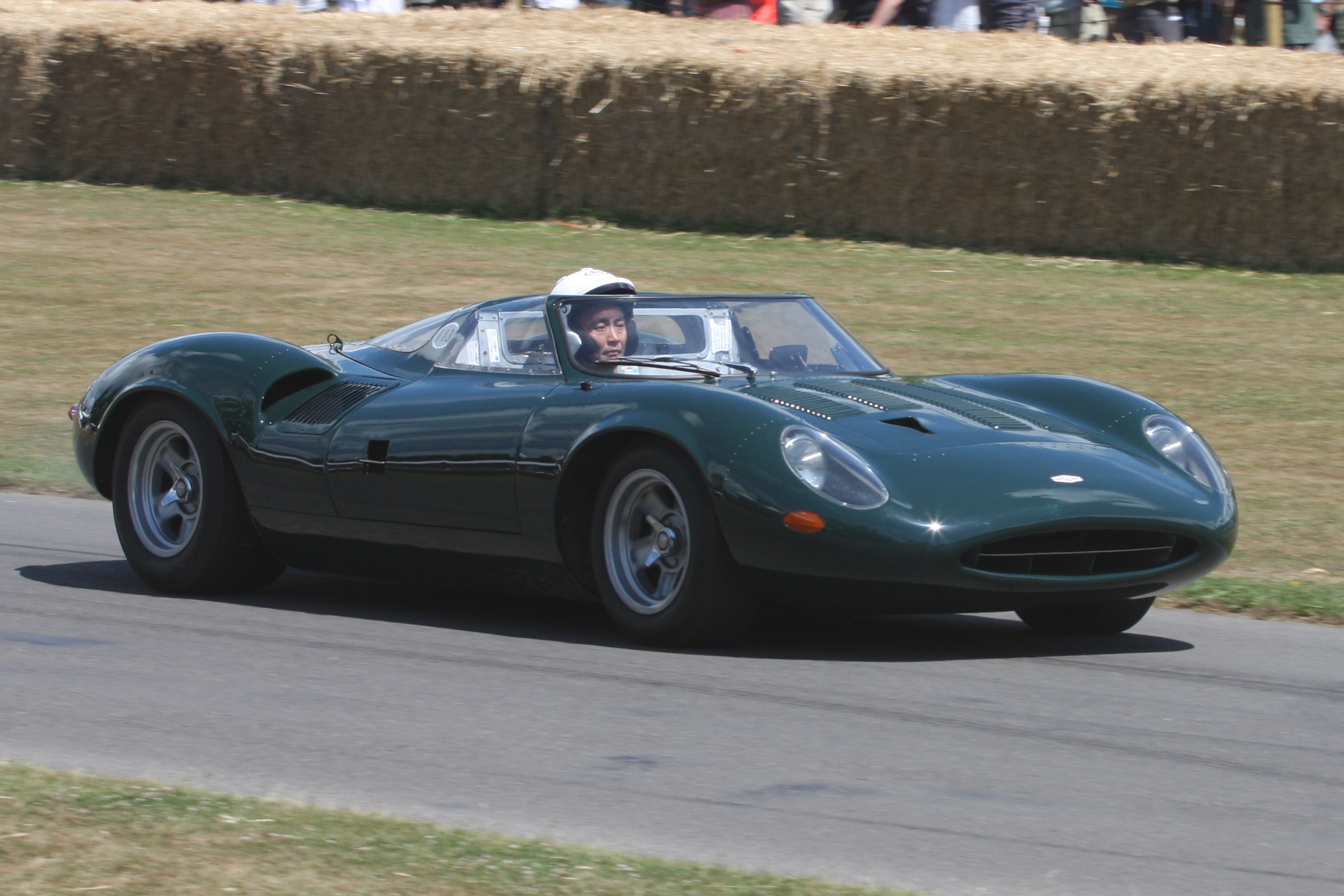
The LM69 homages the 1966 Jaguar XJ13 (pictured)

Originally commissioned by Neville Swales of Building The Legend Limited, the LM69 was developed as a homage to the 1966 Jaguar XJ13 race car which was intended to participate to the 24 Hours of Le Mans. However, changes in the homologation rules made the XJ13 suddenly obsolete. Jaguar halted the project and the only built XJ13, not being able to enter any race, was put in storage.

The LM69 was never intended to be an exact replica of the XJ13; rather, Ecurie Ecosse tried to imagine what the XJ13 might have looked like if Jaguar continued its development until 1969. This explains the marked retro design, as well as the absence of post-1960s technology: the LM69 would have complied with any 1969 Le Mans regulation, thus virtually allowing Scottish racing team Ecurie Ecosse to participate to the 1969 event (hence its name) and racing in the same league of the Ford GT40 and Porsche 917.

== Design ==
The car was commissioned by Neville Swales of Building The Legend Limited and designed by Howard Guy and his team at Design Q Unlike the heavier all-aluminium XJ13, the LM69's body is made of both aluminium and composite materials, covering a purpose-built chassis. The LM69 also sports a closed cockpit, a more refined aerodynamics and wider tires. The mid-mounted engine lies under a transparent deck lid.

== Specifications ==
The LM69 uses a mid-mounted, quad-cam, V12 engine designed as a near-period reproduction, and called tera. It is based on the same design of the original Jaguar power unit, and comes with either 6.1 L, or its stroked version developed by Neville Swales with capacity expanded to 6.8 L. Distribution and injection are standard for the period; modern, electronic optional for the latter would be available. The transmission includes a 5-speed manual gearbox.

Ecurie Ecosse did not provide official performance specifications for the LM69 besides the claim that the 6.8 L version would exceed 700 hp (522 kW).The car is purportedly able to accelerate from 0 to 60 mph (97 km/h) in 3.2 seconds and to reach a top speed of 203 mph (327 km/h). By comparison, the original 5.0 L V12 engine of the XJ13 had an output of 502 hp (374 kW) which could bring the Jaguar up to 170 mph (274 km/h) in fifth gear.

== Production ==
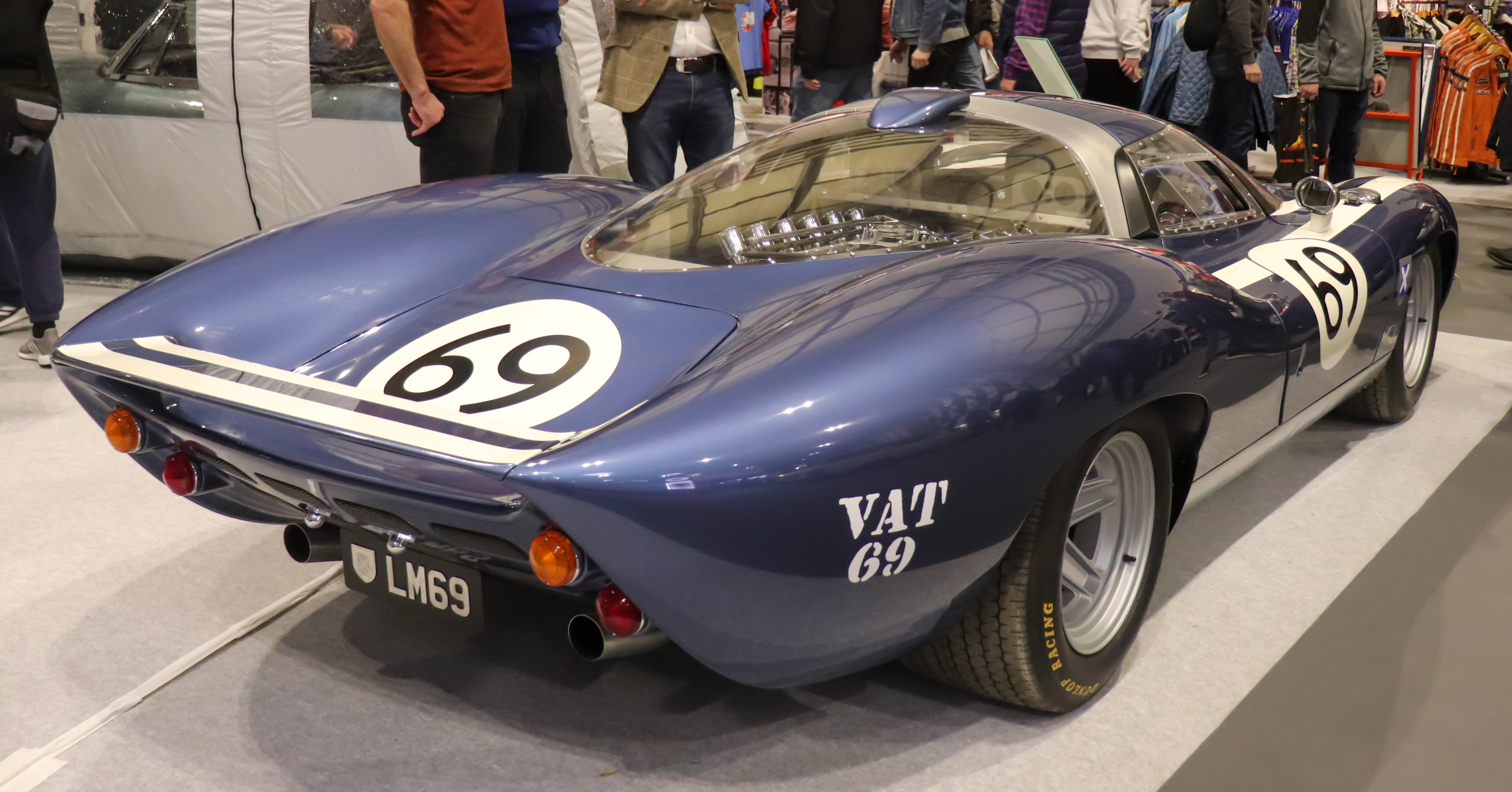
LM69 rear view

Only 25 units of the LM69 are planned to be produced, which is exactly the minimum requirement for the 1969 FIA homologation. Each car would be hand-built in England at the Ecurie Cars factory, and is priced £875,000 ($1.54 million) for the standard configuration. Despite its background as a race car, the LM69 is road-legal at least in the United Kingdom.
The first built LM69 was exhibited at the 2020 International Concours d'Elegance at Hampton Court Palace, London.

There are tentative plans to revive this project as the "Ecurie 69"
