= Walter Hassan =

British automotive engineer

Walter Thomas Frederick Hassan OBE, C.Eng., M.I. Mech.E. (25 April 1905 – 12 July 1996) was a distinguished UK automotive engineer who took part in the design and development of three very successful engines: Jaguar XK, Coventry Climax and Jaguar V12, as well as the ERA racing car.

== Early life ==
Hassan was born in London where his father, of Northern Irish descent, owned a clothes store in Holloway. His natural interest was always in mechanical things. As it was told, his uncle encouraged him to be a creator since his uncle was building model ships.

He studied at the Northern Polytechnic Institute (subsequently renamed and amalgamated by stages into London Metropolitan University) and then Hackney Technical Institute of Engineering. The Regent Street Polytechnic (now incorporated into the University of Westminster) has also been named.

== Bentley ==
Hassan's first job was as a 15 year-old shop boy in W. O. Bentley's newly founded Bentley Motors, employee No. 14. He was a fitter in the engine shop then in the chassis shop, gaining a complete experience of the 3-litre cars then in production.

He eventually moved to road testing working under the head of experimental department (today's R&D) Frank Clement, the company's professional racing driver, and was a riding mechanic in some races. In the off-season he was part of the Bentley Motors service department.

Hassan was later assigned as a mechanic to Woolf Barnato, the Bentley Motors chairman and racing driver, with whom he maintained a long-term working relationship.

After it was put into liquidation and taken over by Rolls-Royce at the end of 1931 Hassan left Bentley Motors and worked for Barnato. In 1933, he started to build a racing car that would become known as Barnato Hassan and was one of the fastest cars ever to lap Brooklands. Later he developed a car for Bill Pacey, known as the Pacey-Hassan. It was a success on the British racing circuits in the 1936 season. By now he had become a family man and accordingly sought out more stable employment. He had married in 1933 and he went on to have four children.

== ERA ==
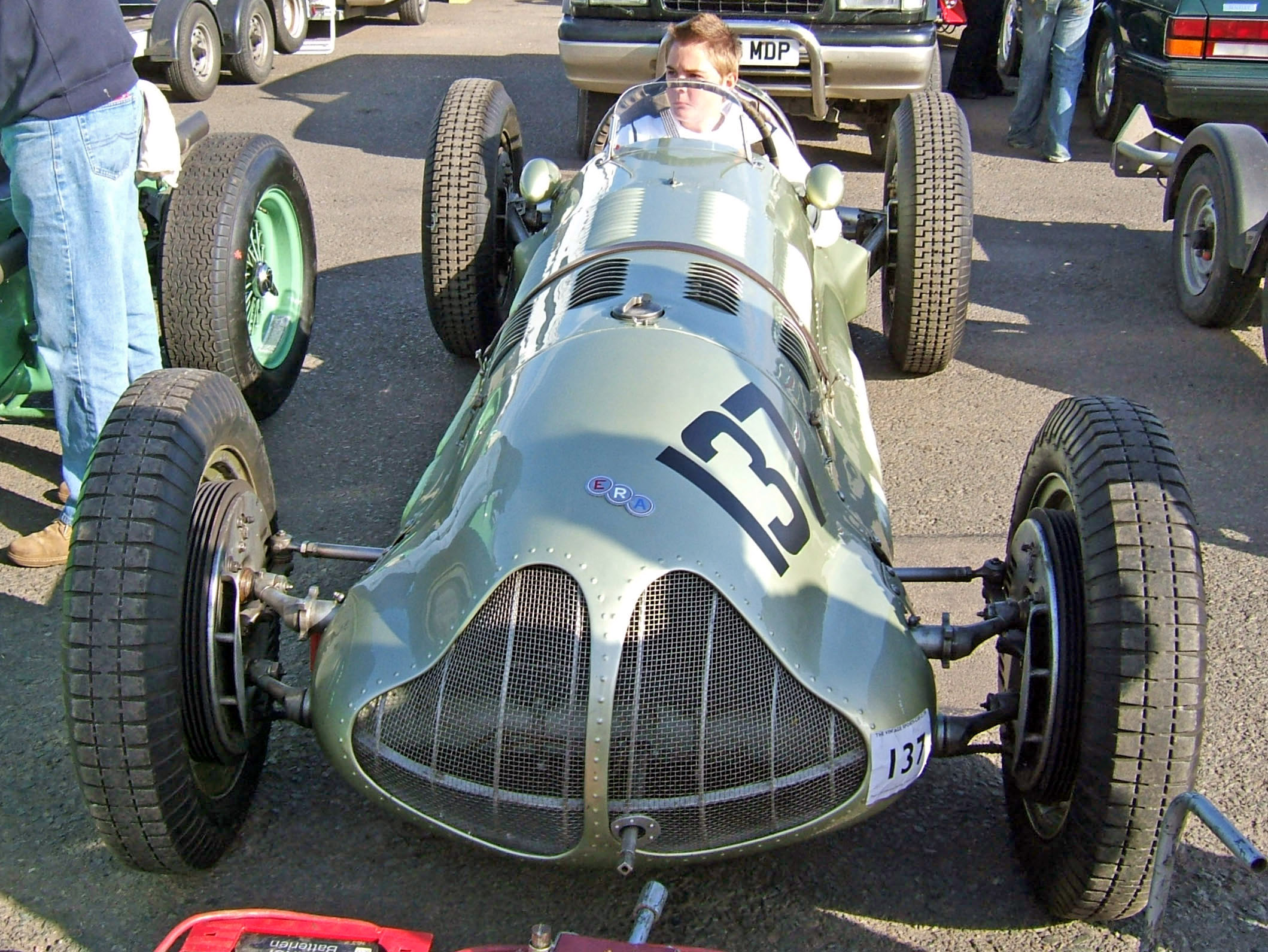
1938 E-Type chassis no. GP1, raced by H.L. Brooke, Leslie Johnson, Reg Parnell, Peter Walker and Peter Whitehead

Hassan then spent time at Raymond Mays' ERA at Bourne in Lincolnshire working there with Peter Berthon on engine development and at Brooklands with Thompson and Taylor on ERA chassis development.

The vast majority of prewar ERAs are still in existence and they have continuous and verifiable provenance. They still compete in historic events despite the youngest being nearly seventy years old (as of 2018).

== Jaguar ==
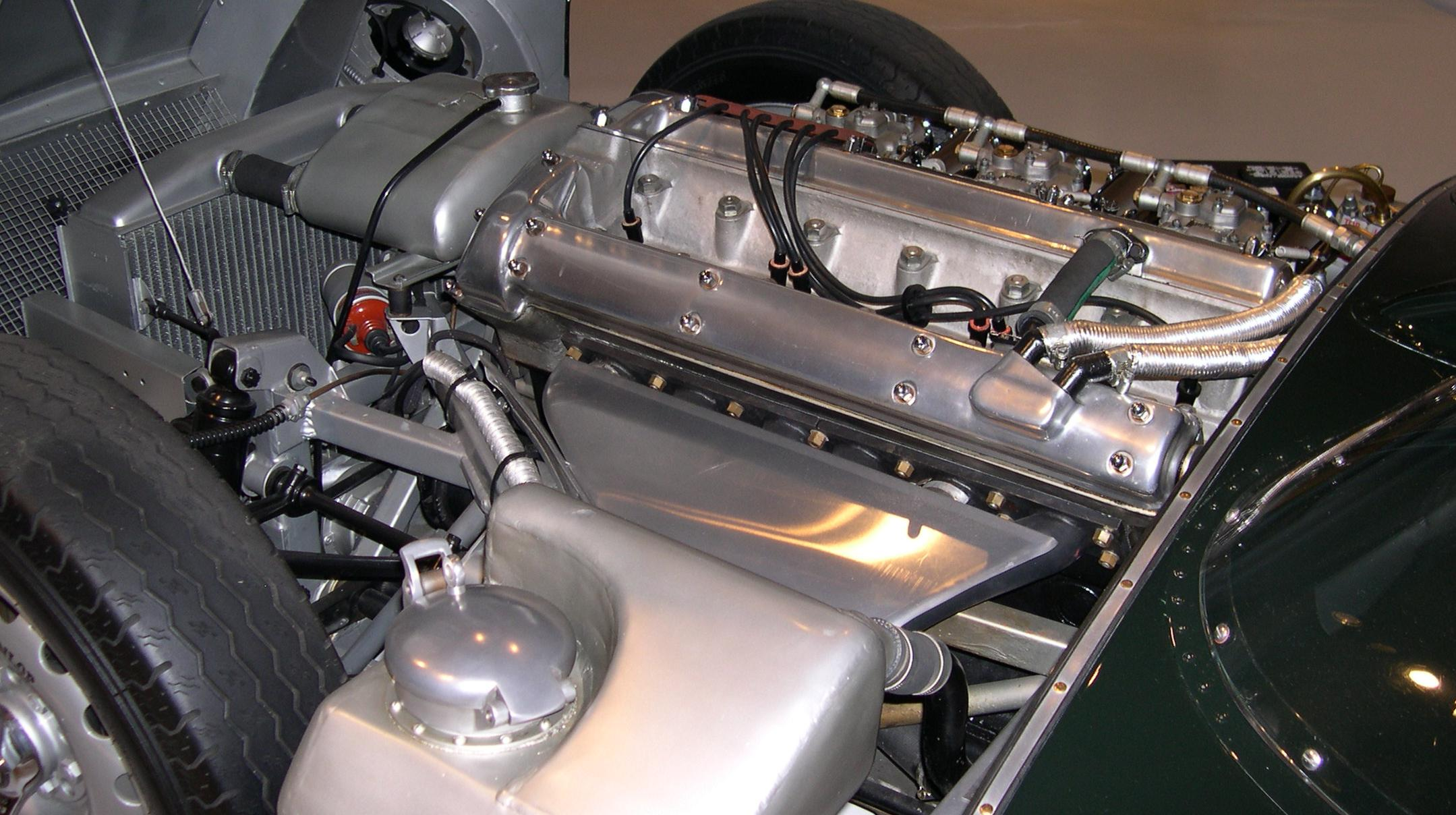
XK engine in a D-type Jaguar 1955

In 1938 he joined SS Cars Ltd, later Jaguar Cars, as development engineer at Coventry. When the war started (1939) he moved to Bristol and worked on aero engine development for the Bristol Engine Company. At the end of the war he returned to Coventry to continue to work with Bill Heynes on what became the XK engine.

This engine remained in production with various displacements from 1948 until 1992.

This XK engine powered the winning car at Le Mans in 1951, 1953, 1955, 1956, and 1957.

== Coventry Climax ==
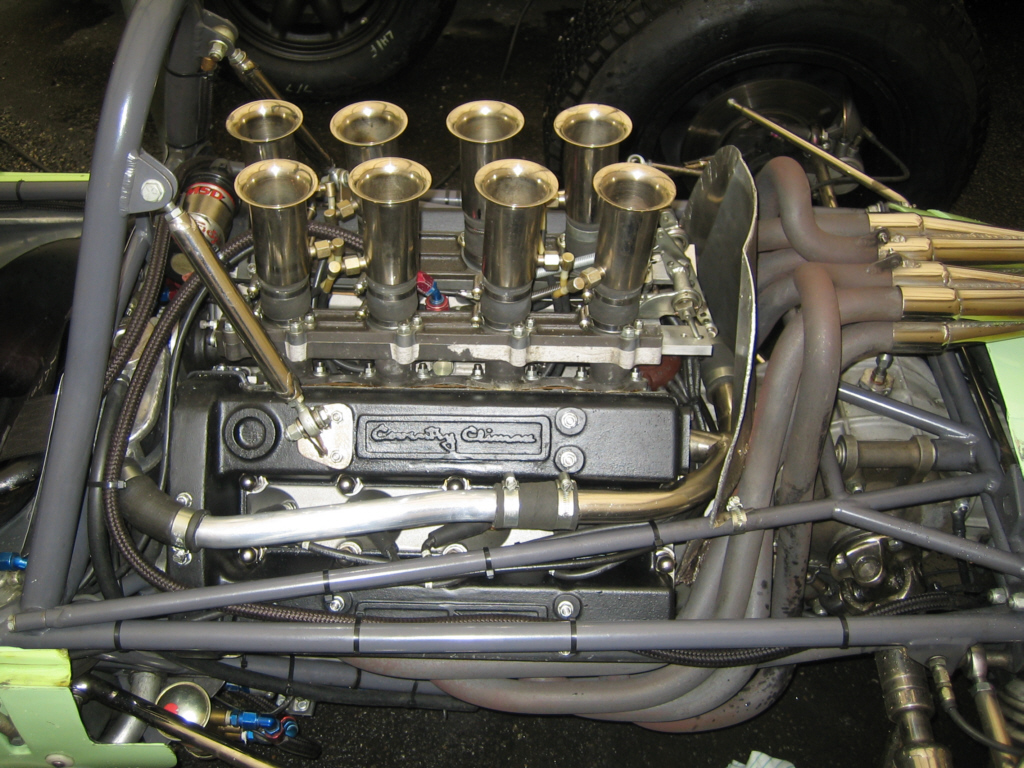
A 1.5L FWMV V8, installed in a Lotus 24 Formula One car.

In 1950 Hassan joined Harry Mundy at Coventry Climax, and they designed the FW series (featherweight) lightweight overhead camshaft engine intended for fire pumps but further developed for motor racing.

In Colin Chapman's cars they had great successes in the Le Mans 24 Hours, Formula 2 and Formula 1, twice bringing the world championship to Jim Clark and Team Lotus.

This engine was also used in cars like the Lotus Elite.

== Jaguar V12 ==
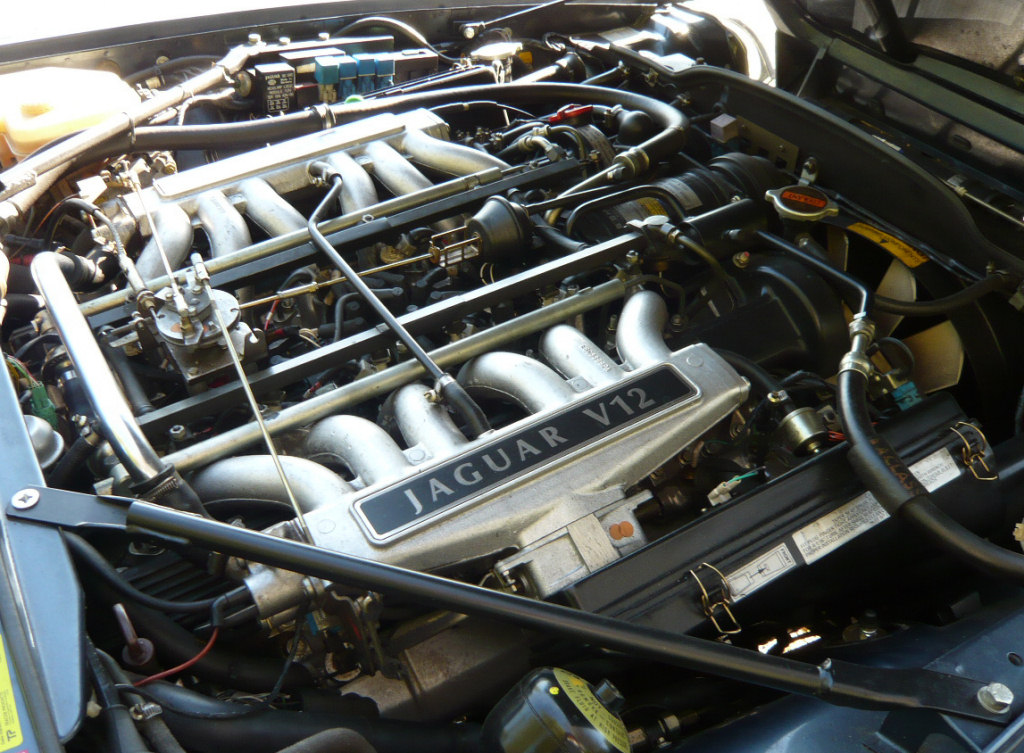
Jaguar 5.3 V12 engine in an XJS (1992)

Coventry Climax was bought by Jaguar in 1963. Bill Heynes and Claude Baily, the original V12 engine designers, were then joined by Hassan and together they went on to develop the Jaguar V12 engine.

In later years, Le Mans-winning Jaguars were powered with a modified V12 racing engine.

A 7.0-litre V12 based on the production 5.3-litre engine powered the winning Jaguar XJR-9 in June 1988.

A Jaguar XJR-12 powered by a 7-litre 60 degree SOHC V12 won in June 1990. During that race it covered 4882.4 km at an average speed of 204.036 km/h / 126.782 mph with a maximum trap speed of 353 km/h / 219 mph.

== Retirement ==
Hassan married Ethel Murray in 1933 and they had a daughter and three sons. He retired on 28 April 1972 at the age of 67 and was awarded the OBE for his services to motor sport. After Ethel's death he lived with his son, Bill, at Kenilworth though he later moved to the Motor Industries Benevolent Home and died at Easenhall, Warwickshire, on 12 July 1996 aged, 91 years old.
