= William Heynes =

English automotive engineer

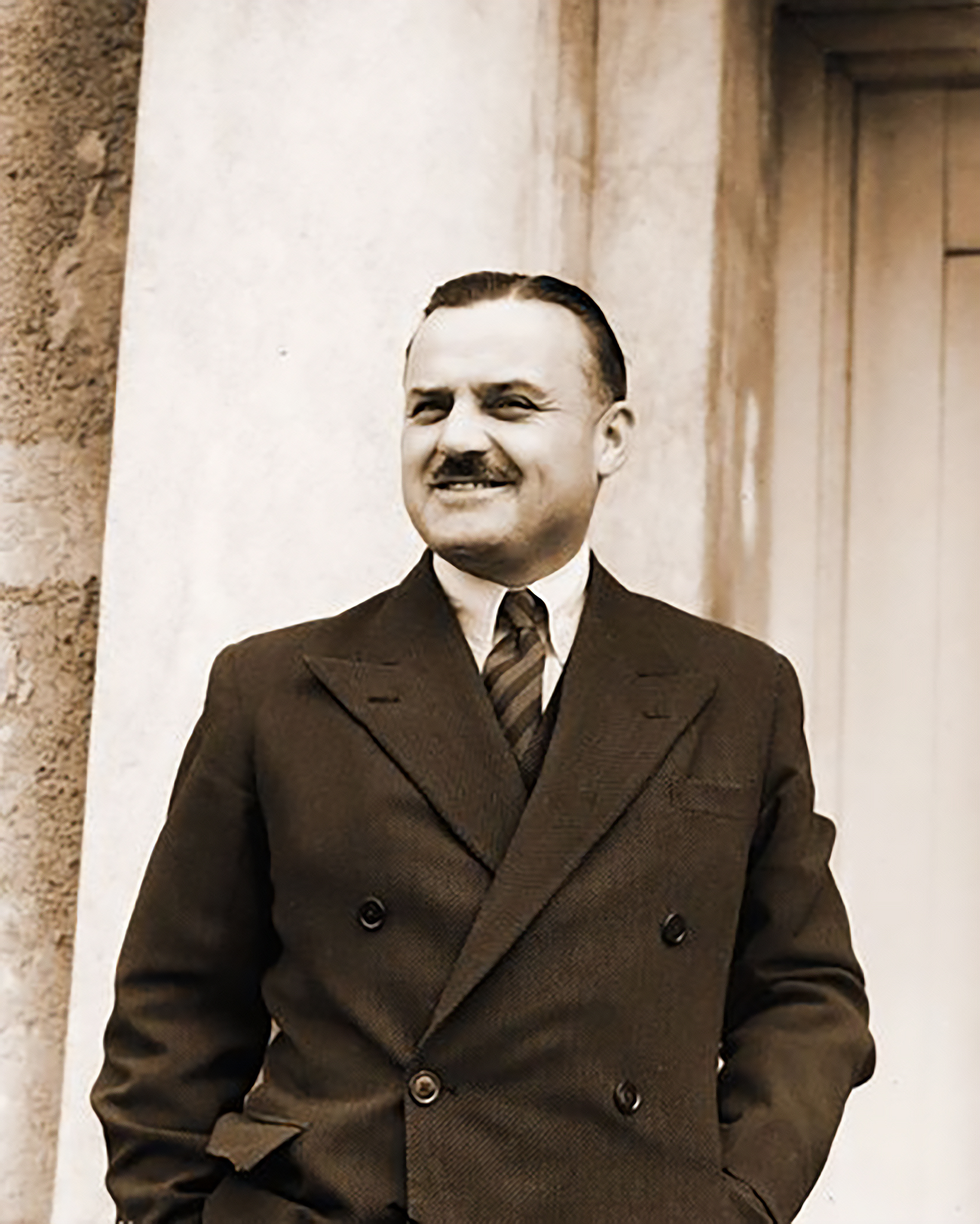
William 'Bill' Heynes

William 'Bill' Munger Heynes CBE (31 December 1903 – July 1989), born in Leamington Spa, was an English automotive engineer.

Heynes was educated at Warwick School from 1914 to 1921 before joining the Humber Car Company in Coventry in 1922 as a student where he worked in the drawing office before becoming head of the technical department in 1930. During this time he oversaw the introduction of significant models including the Humber Snipe and the Humber Pullman.

In April 1935, after the Rootes Group takeover, he was chosen by William Lyons to join SS Cars Ltd. Initially he worked on the chassis and suspension but was also responsible for increasing the power output of the modified Standard Motor Company engines then being used. He worked on development of an overhead-valve conversion for the Standard 6-cylinder engine. One of the first cars to ever have it installed was the SS Jaguar 100.

Following World War II, SS Cars was renamed Jaguar. Heynes, who was appointed to the main Board of Director as Technical Director and Chief Engineer (1946), had earlier persuaded the chairman William Lyons that the company should make its own range of engines. During late war time the XK engine was designed and later developed with a launch in 1948 at the London Motor Show with the new XK120 sports car. The XK engine remained in production in 2.4, 2.8, 3.4, 3.8 and 4.2 models and was a significant design as the mainstay of the company for 35 years.

With Dunlop he was responsible for the Disc Brake joint development in 1952 and later Heynes following racing experience pioneered and introduced the system on all Jaguar cars. The Mk 1 2.4 saloon 1954/55 with monocoque body construction followed the forward design thinking of Heynes and his engineers, post war. This was later in 1961 followed by a world leading independent rear suspension designed by Heynes and developed with R J Knight. This unit remained the standard rear suspension thirty years in E-Type, Mark X, S-Type, 420, XJ6 and XJ12 Series 1, 2 and 3, and XJS.

The Heynes design with Walter Hassan development of torsion bar front suspension was introduced on Mark V 1947 and XK120 1948 and was used on all XK sports cars and Mark VII, VIII and IX saloon cars. A similar design was introduced on all E-Types from 1961 to 1975.

His team of engineers including Harry Weslake (consultant), Walter Hassan and Claude Baily designed the 6-cylinder XK engine, that proved to be the biggest and longest lived success of Jaguar. In 1964 the first V12 engine prototypes were produced and developed and tested. A prototype race car was initiated for Le Mans. A single V12 car XJ13 was completed and tested in 1966 with competitive lap times at Silverstone prior to the project being cancelled. The V12 engine continued to be developed in line with emerging emission regulations for Series 3 E-Type and XJ12 / XJS.

Heynes was Chief Engineer from 1935 until his retirement. As Chief Engineer and Technical Director he was responsible for all Jaguar design / engineering from 1935 up to and including XJS.

Heynes designed the XK range of sports cars XK120 XK140 XK150, including full design of the C-Type 1951 followed by his monocoque body design of the D-Type 1954, followed by the E-Type 1961.

Sir William Lyons was persuaded by William Heynes to enter motor racing in 1950 with XK120 works prepared, privately entered cars at Le Mans; this was followed by winning the Le Mans 24 hour race in 1952 1953 with the C Type and 1955 /56 /57 with his monocoque designed D type. Heynes continued to support private race entrants from the experimental competition section, including Briggs Cunningham in the US with a single prototype E2A, the forerunner of the E Type, and Lister Jaguar in 1958/59 Le Mans and with the full race lightweight E Type 3.8 in 1962/63/64. A mid engined V12 race prototype XJ13 was designed 1964 and tested until cancellation of this last Heynes engineered race car during the company merger with BMC in July 1966.

Heynes designed the first British monocoque (unitary) saloon 2.4 and 3.4 models 1955, followed by Mk 2 models with 3.8 litre XK engine. The earlier Jaguar saloon cars from 1950 Mk7 Mk8 Mk9 continued in production with 3.4 3.8 engines until 1961. Heynes was responsible for the Mk 10 saloon October 1961, which incorporated new front suspension in conjunction with a new independent rear suspension also designed for the E Type introduced earlier in 1961. Introducing two new models in the same year determines his great engineering and design strength from a small talented engineering team.

Heynes with Sir William Lyons designed and engineered the XJ6 saloon, launched in September 1968. The model was voted best car of the year and laid the foundation for the next seventeen years. The XJ6 success was followed by XJS using similar chassis platform and V12 power units designed and initiated by Heynes before retirement.

Heynes always acknowledged his engineering team which he had directed and built up from 1935 and their contribution to the success of Jaguar.

At the end of 1969 he retired as Vice Chairman and Technical Director of Jaguar, after 35 years. Following his retirement it was reported that he intended to "devote enthusiasm to his farm whilst maintaining strong motor industry links and advising and assisting his close factory relationship with William Lyons and the Jaguar directors, F.R.W "Lofty" England and Bob Knight."

Shortly before his retirement he was honoured with a CBE for his services to exports and vehicle design. His responsibilities were taken over by R. J. ("Bob") Knight (Chief Vehicle Engineer) and W.T.F. ("Wally") Hassan (Chief Engineer, Power Units), both of whom were appointed to the company's board as part of their promotion.

== See also ==
- Harry Mundy
- Walter Hassan
