= Jaguar C-Type =

Jaguar sports-racing car

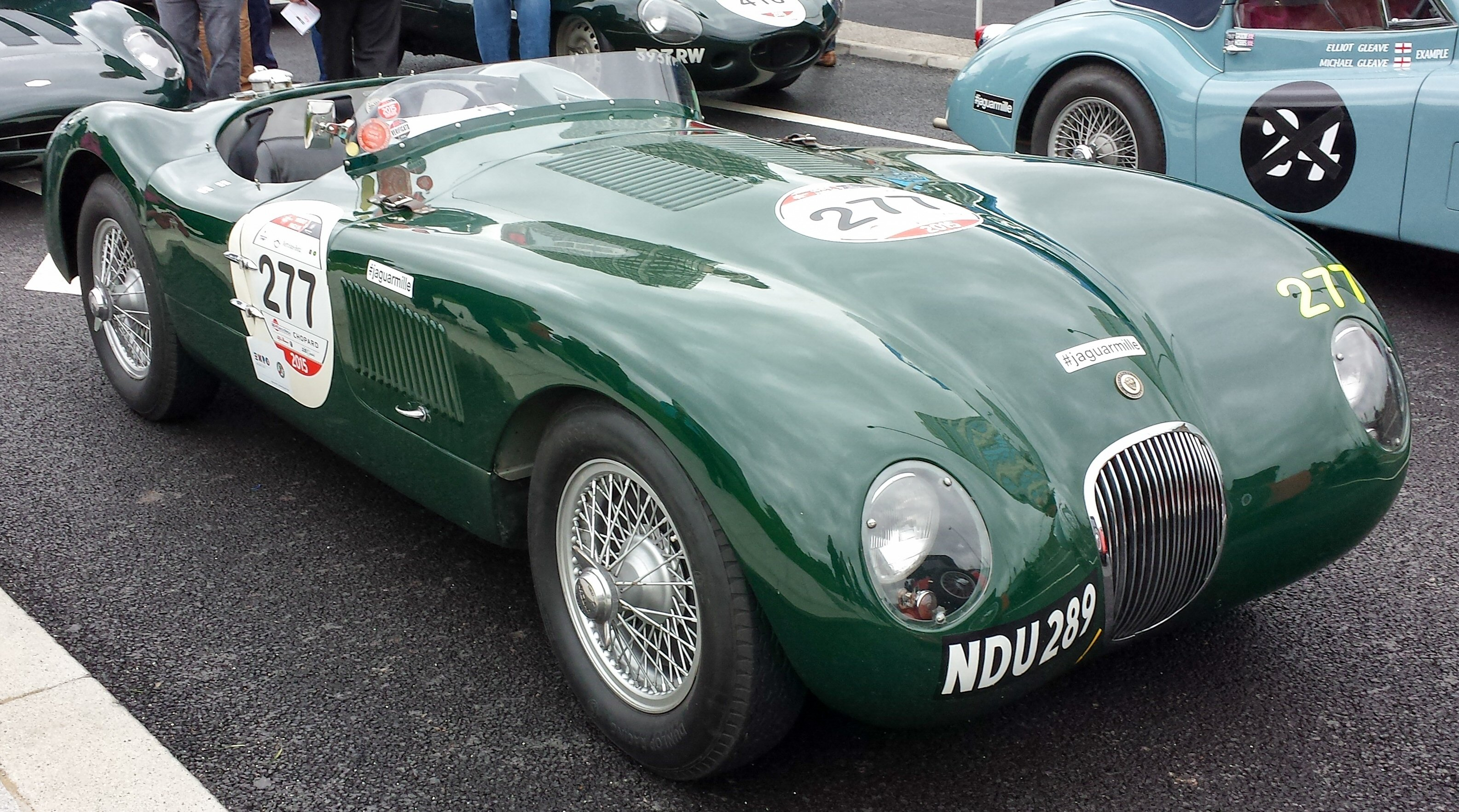

Overview
- Manufacturer: Jaguar Cars
- Production: 1951–1953
- Assembly: United Kingdom: Coventry
- Designer: William Heynes, Malcolm Sayer, Bob Knight

Body and chassis
- Class: Competition-Sports car
- Body style: Roadster

Powertrain
- Engine: 3,442 cm^{3} (210.04 cu in) XK6 I6

Chronology
- Successor: Jaguar D-Type

The Jaguar C-Type (officially called the Jaguar XK120-C) is a racing sports car built by Jaguar and sold from 1951 to 1953. The "C" stands for "competition".

The car combined the running gear of the contemporary, road-proven XK120, with a lightweight tubular frame designed by Jaguar Chief Engineer William Heynes, and an aerodynamic aluminium body, jointly developed by William Heynes, Bob Knight and later Malcolm Sayer. A total of 53 C-Types were built, 43 of which were sold to private owners, mainly in the US.

== Specification ==
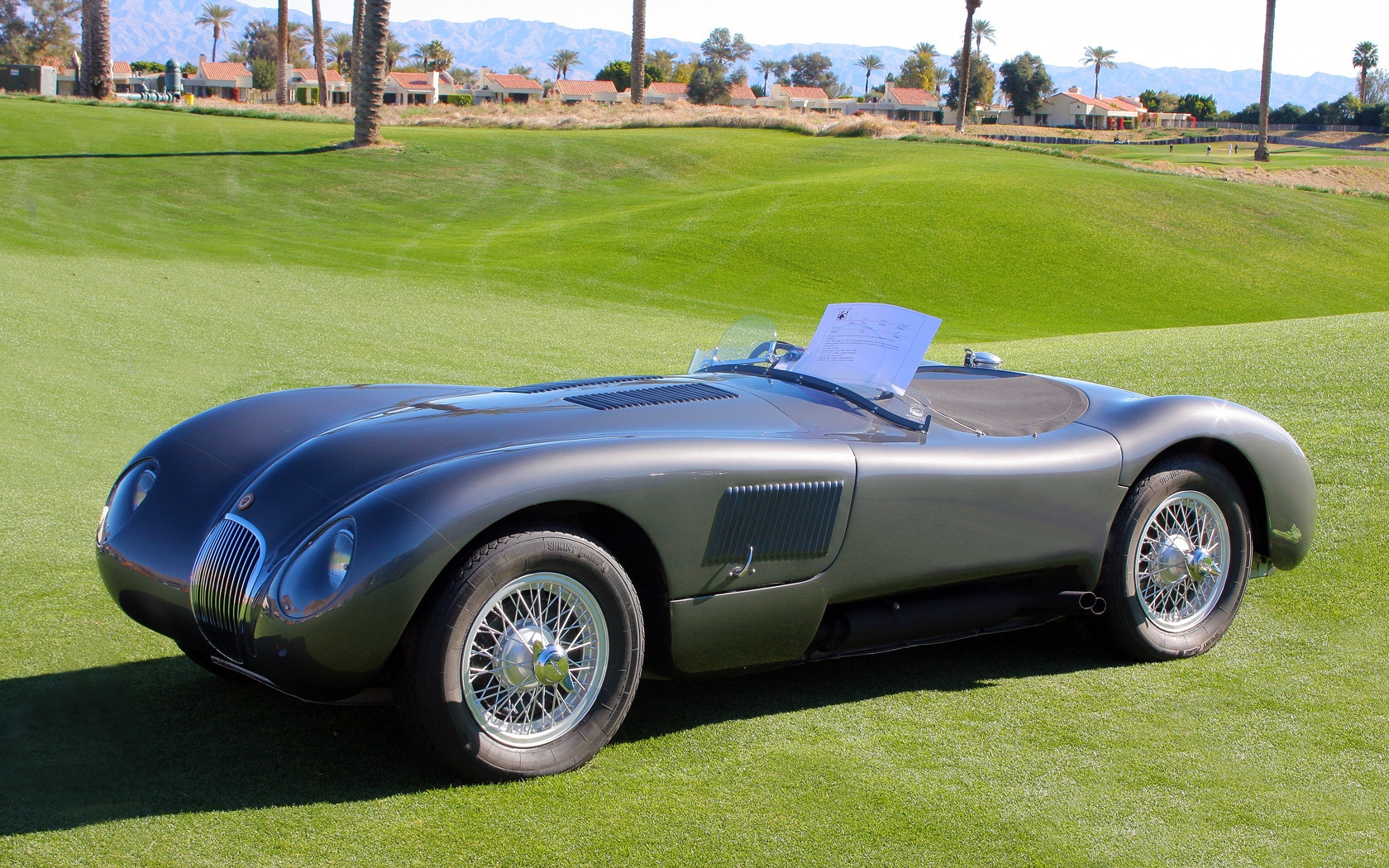
1953 C-Type

The road-going XK120's 3.4-litre twin-cam, straight-six engine produced between 160 and 180 bhp (134 kW). The C-Type version was originally tuned to around 205 bhp (153 kW). The early C-Types were fitted with SU carburettors and drum brakes. Later C-Types, produced from mid 1953, were more powerful, using triple twin-choke Weber carburettors and high-lift camshafts. They were also lighter, and braking performance was improved by using disc brakes on all four wheels. The lightweight, multi-tubular, triangulated frame was designed by Heynes. Heynes, Knight and Sayer together developed the aerodynamic body. Made of aluminium in the barchetta style, it was devoid of road-going items such as carpets, weather equipment and exterior door handles. According to the Jaguar Heritage Registry, the cars were produced between May 1952, starting with XKC001, and ending in August 1953 with XK054. The original alloy body was marked with the prefix K (e.g. K1037).

== Racing ==
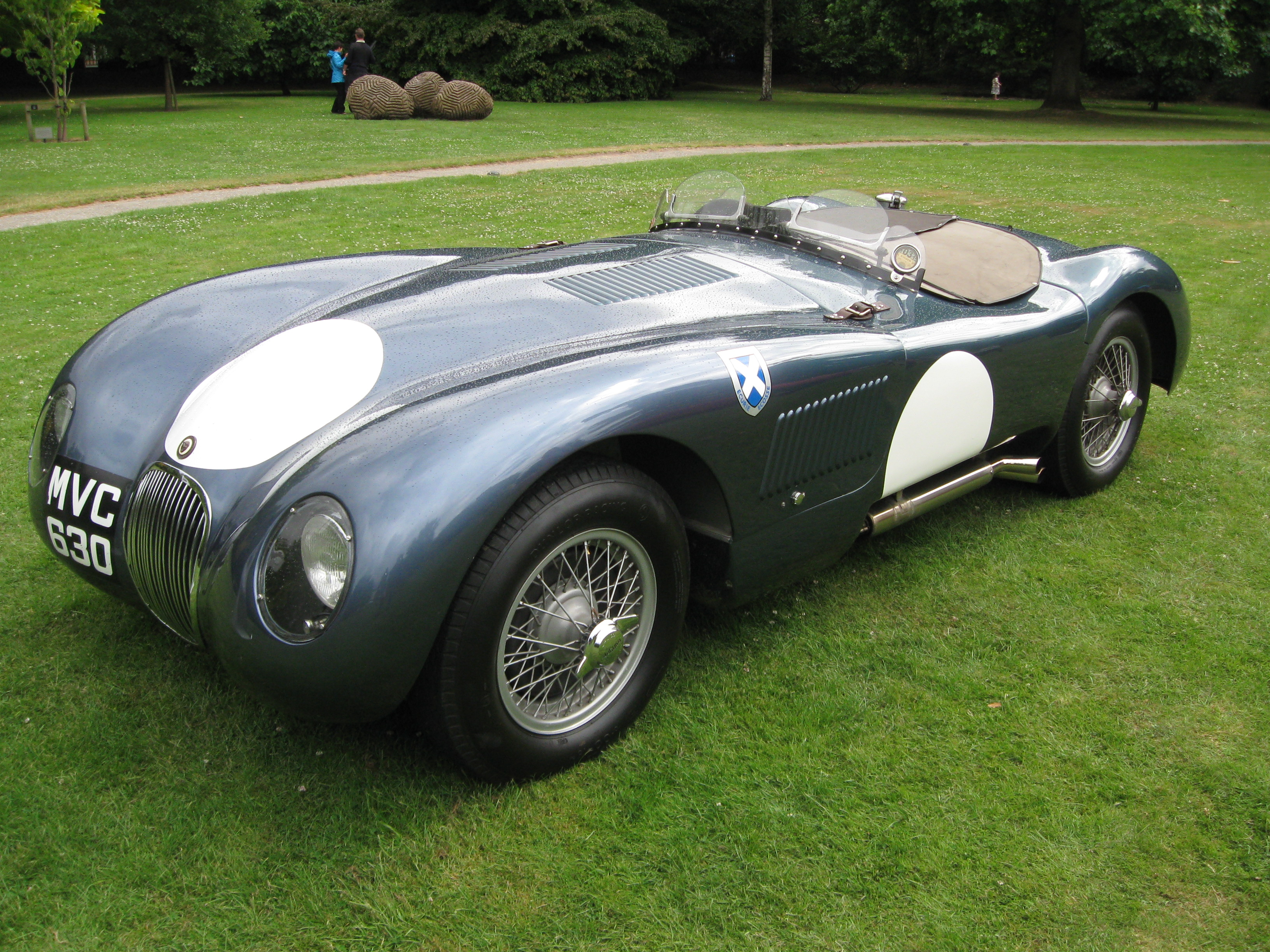
1953 Jaguar C-Type in Ecurie Ecosse colours displayed at Dulwich Picture Gallery, 29 June 2014

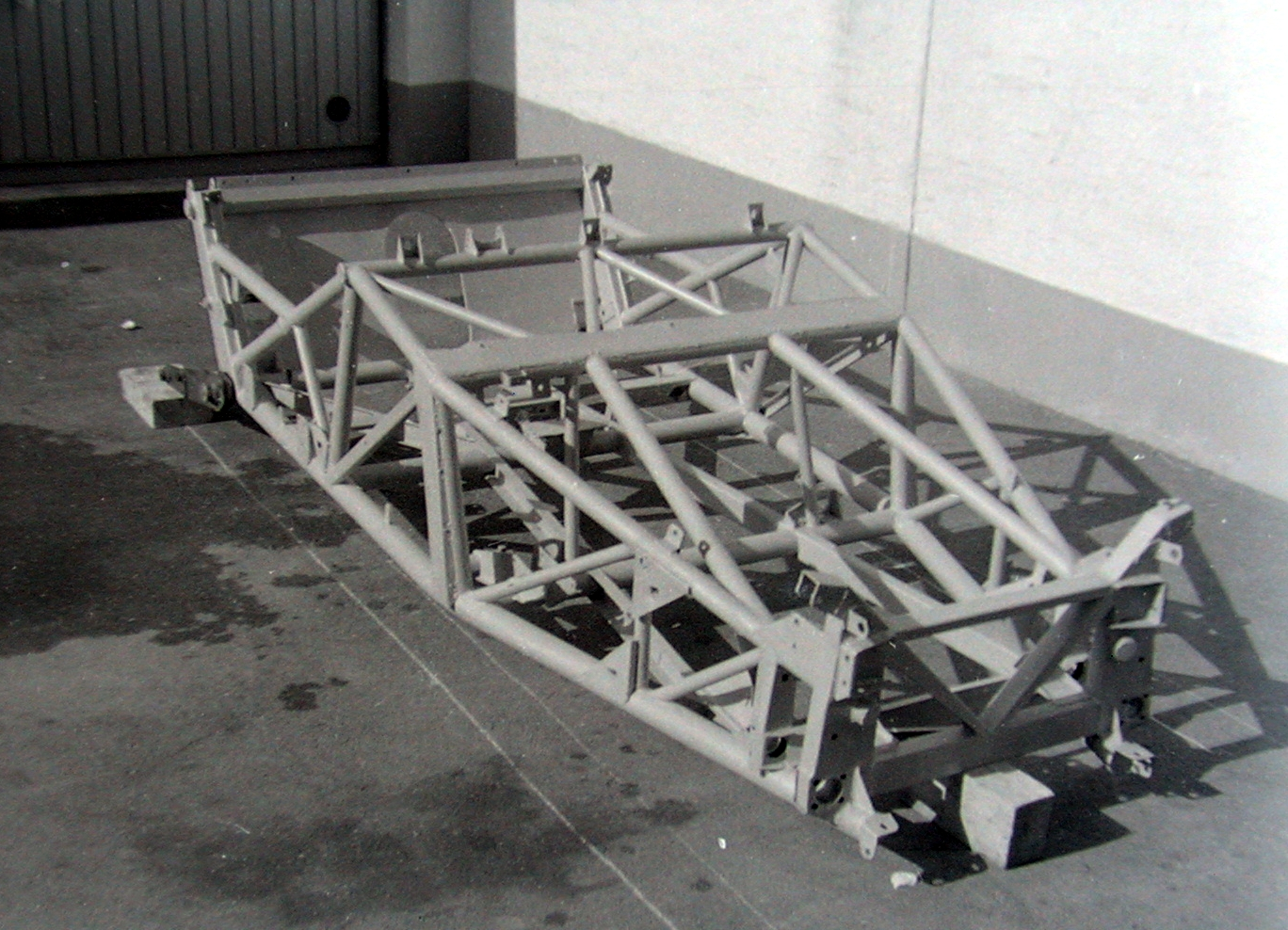
C-Type frame

The C-Type was successful in racing, most notably at the Le Mans 24 hours race, which it won twice.

In 1951, the car won at its first attempt. The factory entered three, whose driver pairings were Stirling Moss and Jack Fairman, Leslie Johnson and triple Mille Miglia winner Clemente Biondetti, and the eventual winners, Peter Walker and Peter Whitehead. The Walker-Whitehead car was the only factory entry to finish, the other two retiring with lack of oil pressure. A privately entered XK120, owned by Robert Lawrie, co-driven by Ivan Waller, also completed the race, finishing 11th.

In 1952, Jaguar, worried by a report about the speed of the Mercedes-Benz 300SLs that would run at Le Mans, modified the C-Type's aerodynamics to increase the top speed. However, the consequent rearrangement of the cooling system made the cars vulnerable to overheating, and all three retired from the race. The Peter Whitehead-Ian Stewart and Tony Rolt/Duncan Hamilton cars blew head gaskets, and the Stirling Moss-Peter Walker car, the only one not overheating having had a full-sized radiator hurriedly fitted, lost oil pressure after a mechanical breakage. Testing by Norman Dewis at MIRA after the race proved that the overheating was caused more by the revisions to the cooling system than by the altered aerodynamics: the water pump pulley was undersized, so it was spinning too fast and causing cavitation; also the header tank was in front of the passenger-side bulkhead, far from the radiator, and the tubing diameter was too small at 7/8 inch. With the pump pulley enlarged, and the tubing increased to 1 1/4-inch, the problem was eliminated. The main drawback of the new body shape was that it reduced downforce on the tail to the extent that it caused lift and directional instability at speeds over 120 mph (193 km/h) on the Mulsanne Straight. These cars had chassis numbers XKC 001, 002 and 011. The first two were dismantled at the factory, and the third survives in normal C-type form.

In 1953, C-Types won again, and also placed second and fourth. This time the body was in thinner, lighter aluminium and the original twin H8 sand cast SU carburettors were replaced by three DCO3 40mm Webers, which helped boost power to 220 bhp (164 kW). Philip Porter mentions additional changes:

Further weight was saved by using a rubber bag fuel tank ... lighter electrical equipment and thinner gauge steel for some of the chassis tubes ... [T]he most significant change to the cars were the triple Weber carburetors and [switch to] disc brakes.

Duncan Hamilton and Tony Rolt won the race at 105.85 mph (170.35 km/h) – the first time Le Mans had been won at an average of over 100 miles per hour (161 km/h).

Disc brakes were novel in 1953, and Jaguar's win, partly due to their superiority, set off a scramble to include discs in production cars.

1954, the C-Type's final year at Le Mans, saw a fourth place by the Ecurie Francorchamps entry driven by Roger Laurent and Jacques Swaters.

== Values ==
When new, the car sold for about $6,000, approximately twice the price of an XK120. In an article in the 11 June 2003 issue of Autocar magazine ("Slick Cat Jaguar", p. 70) the value of a "genuine, healthy" C-Type is estimated as £400,000, and the value of the 1953 Le Mans winner is about £2 million; replicas are available from a variety of sources from £40,000. A C-Type once owned and raced by Phil Hill sold at an American auction in August 2009 for $2,530,000 and another C-type was sold at the Pebble Beach auction in 2012 for $3,725,000, Recently an unrestored C-Type that raced at Le Mans has sold for £5,715,580, during the Grand Prix Historique race meeting in Monaco. In August 2015, an ex-Ecurie Ecosse Lightweight C-type, chassis XKC052 and the second of only three works lightweights, driven by Peter Whitehead and Ian Stewart to fourth at the 1953 Le Mans 24 Hours, fetched $13.2 million (£8.4 million) at auction in California.
