= Jaguar V12 engine =

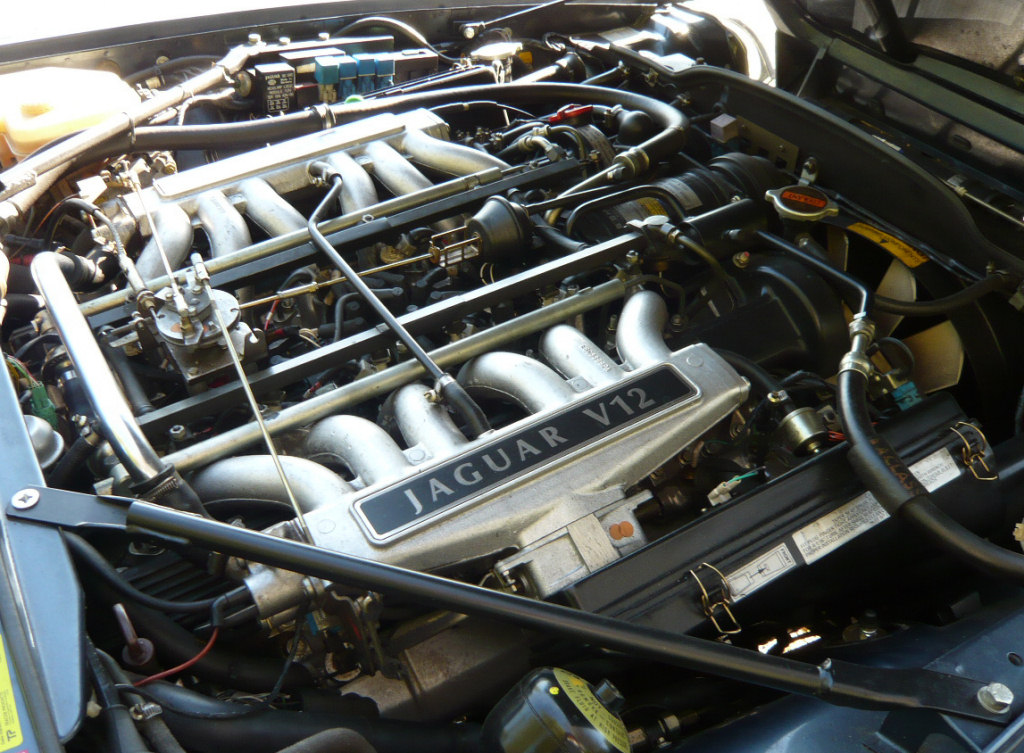
- 5.3 L (5,344 cc) in a Jaguar XJS

Overview
- Manufacturer: Jaguar Cars
- Production: 1971–1997 (161,583 units)

Layout
- Configuration: Naturally aspirated 60° V12
- Displacement: 5.3 L (5,344 cc); 6.0 L (5,993 cc); 7.0 L (6,995 cc)
- Cylinder bore: 90 mm (3.54 in); 94 mm (3.7 in)
- Piston stroke: 70 mm (2.76 in); 78.5 mm (3.09 in); 84 mm (3.31 in)
- Cylinder block material: aluminium, with cast-iron cylinder liners
- Cylinder head material: aluminium
- Valvetrain: SOHC
- Compression ratio: 7.8:1 – 12.5:1

RPM range
- Max. engine speed: 6,500

Combustion
- Fuel system: 4 side draft Zenith-Stromberg carburettors Lucas fuel injection
- Fuel type: Petrol
- Oil system: wet sump
- Cooling system: Water-cooled

Output
- Power output: 242–750 hp (180–559 kW; 245–760 PS)
- Torque output: 295–580 lb⋅ft (400–786 N⋅m)

Chronology
- Successor: Jaguar AJ-V8

The Jaguar V12 engine is a family of SOHC internal combustion V12 engines with a common block design, that were mass-produced by Jaguar Cars for a quarter of a century, from 1971 to 1997, mostly as 5.3 litres, but later also as 6 litres, and 7 litre versions that were deployed in racing. At launch, the engine was the only V12 in mass-production. For 17 years, Jaguar was the only company in the world consistently producing luxury four-door saloons with a V12 engine. The V12 powered all three series of the original Jaguar XJ luxury saloons, as well as its second generation XJ40 and X305 successors.

Originally fitted with carburettors, the SOHC V12s received electronic fuel injection in 1975. In 1981, the engines were improved with higher efficiency (HE) cylinder heads. Including the V12 E-Type mark 3 models, and in the XJS (from 1975 to 1996), Jaguar made a total of 161,583 SOHC V12-engined cars. The Jaguar V12 was regarded as one of the premier power plants of the 1970s and 1980s. After launching the second generation XJ series in 1986, Jaguar developed their V12 into the racing engines that brought two overall victories at the 24 Hours of Le Mans endurance races of 1988 and 1990.

The engine was initiated in 1951 by Claude Baily as a prototype design for an intended Le Mans racecar: the Jaguar XJ13 - as well as for planned use in Jaguar’s range of luxury and sports cars. After building six DOHC engines, three of which were extensively tested in cars, the XJ13 project was terminated in 1967, before the car ever entered into competition. Under the direction of Jaguar Chief Engineer William Heynes, the DOHC V12 engine design was reworked by engineers Walter Hassan and Harry Mundy into a road-going SOHC production-vehicle version, first installed in the Jaguar E-Type mark 3 of 1971. The SOHC V12 was just the second production engine design in Jaguar's history, after the 1949 straight-six XK engine, built through 1992. It uses an all-aluminium block and cylinder heads with removable wet steel liners, and single overhead camshafts with two valves per cylinder.

== Development ==
Initial designs for a V12 engine were produced by engineer Claude Bailey as early as 1951, with a view to using it in a Le Mans race-car. Bailey's original 8.0 L design used double overhead camshafts heads sharing the same basic layout as the inline 6-cylinder XK engine, in order to allow for a relatively high redline. Even after Jaguar withdrew from racing in 1957, the V12 design continued to be refined, and Bailey proposed a range of displacements from 7.6 L (sharing 87 mm bore and 106 mm stroke measurements with the 3.8 L XK) down to 5.0 L (sharing the 2.4 L XK's 83 mm bore and 76.5 mm stroke). In 1962 Bailey was instructed to begin prototype tooling and bench testing of a 5.0 L design, having settled on an 87 mm bore and 70 mm stroke.

By 1964 several incarnations of the V12 engine were being tested, including versions meant for racing and others for installation into production cars. An all-aluminium quad-cam design with fuel injection was created for the XJ13, while cast iron blocks and heads, and other double and single overhead cam head designs were created for use in a production road car version. These production versions of the engine were tested in Mark X saloons.

After the XJ13 project was cancelled the team of Hassan and Mundy designed a new single overhead cam head, with the camshaft lobes acting directly on vertically-inclined valves through bucket tappets. This was similar to the cylinder head design of the contemporary Rover 2000, with which the Jaguar V12 also shared the use of dished 'Heron' pistons. These changes reduced complexity, weight, size and noise, and were anticipated to help the engine meet future emissions standards.

The revised head design by Hassan and Mundy also had longer, more restrictive inlet ports sacrificing top-end power but which—along with an increase in displacement to 5.3 litres (5,344 cc) (90 mm bore x 70 mm stroke)—greatly improved performance at lower and mid-range engine speeds, which was more desirable in heavier luxury cars. The chain-driven SOHC heads and the softer valve springs fitted to reduce valve train noise resulted in the red line being lowered to 6,500 rpm from the 8,000 rpm of the original DOHC design.

The engine was continuously refined with various carburettor and fuel injection arrangements before finally seeing production in the Series III E-Type in 1971. At the time, it was the only V12 engine being mass-produced and it was the first such engine since the Lincoln Zephyr V12 of 1936-1948.

== 5.3 Litre ==
The 5.3 litres (5,344 cc) production engine had an oversquare 90 mm (3.54 in) bore x 70 mm (2.76 in) stroke, producing 242 hp (180 kW; 245 PS) to 295 hp (220 kW; 299 PS) (depending on emission controls and compression ratio), and up to 400 N⋅m (295 lb⋅ft) of torque in fuel-injected form. Right from the start of production in 1971 the V12 engine had Lucas OPUS (Oscillating Pick-Up System) electronic ignition. Initially the OPUS ignition amplifier unit was secured directly to the engine between the cylinder heads and had problems due to overheating. In later cars the ignition amplifier had been moved away from the engine where it could get air flow for cooling. Originally the V12 was supposed to use an advanced fuel injection system under development by AE Brico but this plan was cancelled at a late stage, possibly due to concerns that the design was too similar to Bosch products. The V12 as used in the Series 3 E-Types, Series 1 XJ12 and early Series 2 XJ12s (1973–April 1975) had four side draft Zenith-Stromberg carburettors. After April 1975, the V12 engine used in the Series 2 XJ12 and the new XJ-S had a licensed copy of the Bosch D-Jetronic system adapted by Lucas for use on the V12.

This version was used in the following cars:

- 1971–1974 Jaguar E-Type
- 1975–1981 Jaguar XJS
- 1972–1981 Jaguar XJ12 (Series 1 and 2)
- 1973–1981 Daimler Double-Six (Series 1 and 2)
- 1972–1981 Panther J.72
- 1974–1985 Panther De Ville

== 5.3 Litre HE ==
A "high-efficiency" (HE) version of the engine debuted in 1981, using special high-swirl design cylinder heads designed by Swiss racing driver Michael May. May's design consisted of a swirl chamber at the exhaust valve with a channel around the intake valve. The use of conventional flat-topped pistons in lieu of the original design's dished type allowed squish from the compression stroke to push the air through the channel around the intake valve to the chamber below the exhaust valve, causing turbulent swirling flow around the spark plug (which had been relocated near the exhaust valve at the top of the chamber). This design created a stratified charge, allowing the engine to run at an unusually high compression ratio for the time (10.5:1 to 12.5:1, depending on market and year) while running a relatively lean fuel mixture. In any given market power levels remained similar to the previous model, but fuel economy was improved by nearly 50%. A new fuel injection system called "Digital P" featuring a digital ECU with integrated manifold air pressure transducer was installed, replacing the older analogue control unit and remote pressure sensor from Bosch's original D-Jetronic design. (However, cars sold in Australia, Sweden and Switzerland continued to use the D-Jetronic system until at least 1985.)

The OPUS ignition was replaced by Lucas's Constant Energy Ignition (CEI) in 1982, to deliver a more reliable spark. Series 3 XJ12 and Daimler Double Six cars used the CEI system until the end of their production in 1992, but it was superseded in the XJ-S in mid-1989 by another from Magneti Marelli. The Marelli ignition system was used until the end of XJ-S production, and on the 6.0 L (5,993 cc) version used in the XJ81 four-door saloons made in 1993 and 1994.

The 5.3 HE was used in the following applications:

- 1981–1992 Jaguar XJ12 (Series 3)
- 1981–1992 Jaguar XJ-S
- 1981–1992 Daimler Double-Six (Series 3)

== 6.0 Litre HE ==
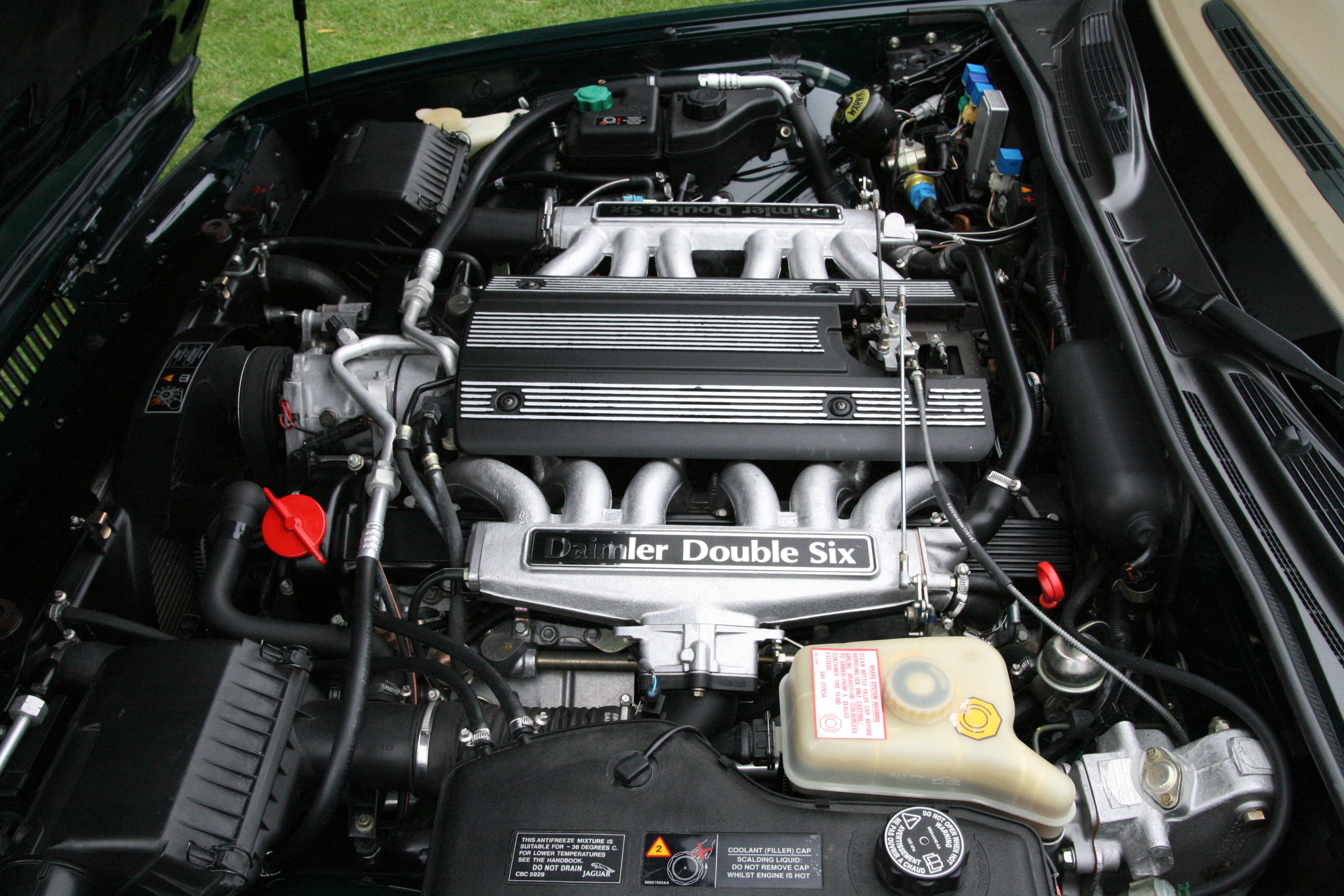
Daimler Double Six 6.0 litres (5,993 cc) V12 engine (1994)

The engine was stroked to 78.5 mm (3.09 in) in 1992 for a displacement of 5,993 cc (6.0 L; 365.7 cu in) to make this one of the most powerful Jaguar production engines to date at 318 bhp (322 PS; 237 kW) at 5,400 rpm and 336 lb⋅ft (456 N⋅m) at 3,750 rpm. The XJR-S stayed in the line until 1993 with power raised at 333 bhp (338 PS; 248 kW) at 5250 rpm and 365 lb⋅ft (495 N⋅m) at 3650 rpm of torque. The 6.0 litres (5,993 cc) engine on X305 used a new Nippondenso distributorless crank-fired ignition system with coil packs very similar to Ford EDIS-6 units. The last Jaguar V12 engine was produced on 17 April 1997.

The 6.0 HE was used in the following cars:

- 1989–1993 Jaguar XJR-S 6.0 (from September 1989)
- 1992–1995 Jaguar XJS
- 1993–1994 Jaguar XJ-12 / Daimler Double-Six (XJ40/XJ81)
- 1994–1997 Jaguar XJ-12 / Daimler Double-Six (X300)

== TWR ==
In 1982, Tom Walkinshaw Racing became Jaguar's official team in the European Touring Car Championship, running the XJS with its 5.3L V12 which under the development of TWR would eventually produce a reliable 450 bhp (336 kW; 456 PS). And with drivers such as Tom Walkinshaw himself, Briton Win Percy, West German star Hans Heyer, and budding Formula One driver Martin Brundle, the big Cats would soon become the cars to beat and in 1984 TWR had not only won the ETCC but had also won the 1984 Spa 24 Hours with Walkinshaw, Percy and Heyer driving. The XJS's were retired at the end of 1984 with TWR moving into running the Rover Vitesse in Touring car racing while becoming Jaguar's official factory team in the World Endurance Championship, taking over the project from American team Group 44. However, the XJS V12's were brought out of their early retirement for one off events over 1985, 1986 and 1987 with their best result coming at the 1985 James Hardie 1000 at the famous Mount Panorama Circuit in Australia. Not only were the Jaguars easily the fastest cars in the race (in what was Australia's first year of running to Group A rules), but local Jaguar driver John Goss teamed with TWR regular, West Germany's Armin Hahne in the team's 3rd car to win the race with Walkinshaw and Percy finishing 3rd.

As Jaguar's official World Sportscar Championship team, TWR's first car, XJR6, used the 6.0 L (5,993 cc) engine, but in the following year the engine was upgraded to 6.9 L and in 1988 the XJR9 used the engine's most famous displacement of 7.0 L (6,995 cc). By 1991, the V12 was good for 7.4 L inside the XJR12, developing an impressive 750 bhp (559 kW; 760 PS)

TWR also upgraded production Jaguar cars (usually XJRSes), with a variety of styling, handling and performance modifications. Most of the cars thus modified were straight from the Jaguar factory and sold through Jaguar dealerships.

By 1989, TWR were selling moderate numbers of XJRSes fitted with a 6.0 litres (5,993 cc) version of the V12, which pre-dated the Jaguar production version by some 3 years.

== Lister ==
Lister Cars, a well-known Jaguar tuner with a long history of technical collaboration with the British automaker, made frequent use of this powerplant. The first Jaguar Lister XJRSes were built by the company BLE Automotive in Erdington, Birmingham in the early 1980s until the Lister brand was passed on to WP Automotive of Leatherhead. In 1991, they fitted the 7.0 L; 426.9 cu in (6,995 cc) version of the engine, with a 94 mm × 84 mm (3.70 in × 3.31 in) bore and stroke, into a modified Jaguar XJS, which was rebadged Lister Le Mans. This engine officially produced 546 hp (407 kW; 554 PS) and 580 lb⋅ft (786 N⋅m). From 1993, Lister Cars owner Laurence Pearce produced the company's first in house design the Lister Storm, which, naturally, continued using the V12 engine, both on the road and on the track, the car becoming a mainstay of the FIA GT Championship and several national championships for the following decade.

== See also ==
- Jaguar XK engine
- Coventry Climax
- Jaguar AJ6 engine
