= Daimler Double-Six =

Daimler Double-Six may refer to either of two different series of Daimler V12 engines or to a car produced by Jaguar Cars under the Daimler nameplate.

== Engines made 1926 to 1938 ==
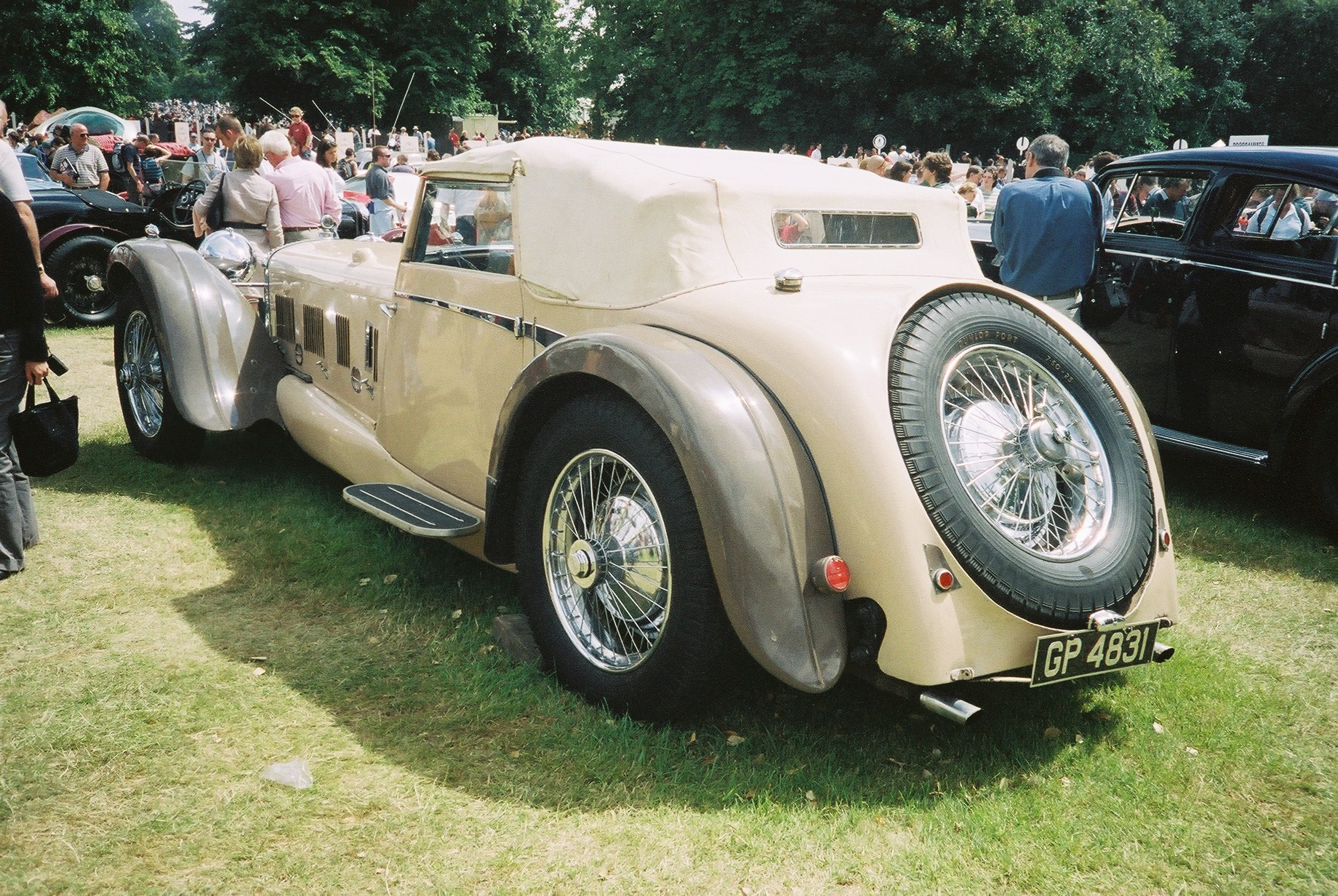
7.1-litre 50 drophead coupé by Corsica of Cricklewood 1931 example

Daimler Double-Six Engine

- 7.1-litre sleeve-valve (1926–1930)
- 3.7-litre sleeve-valve (1927–193?)
- 5.3-litre sleeve-valve (1930–1936)
- 6.5-litre sleeve-valve (1930–1936)
- 6.5-litre poppet valve (1937)

== Engines made 1972 to 1997 ==
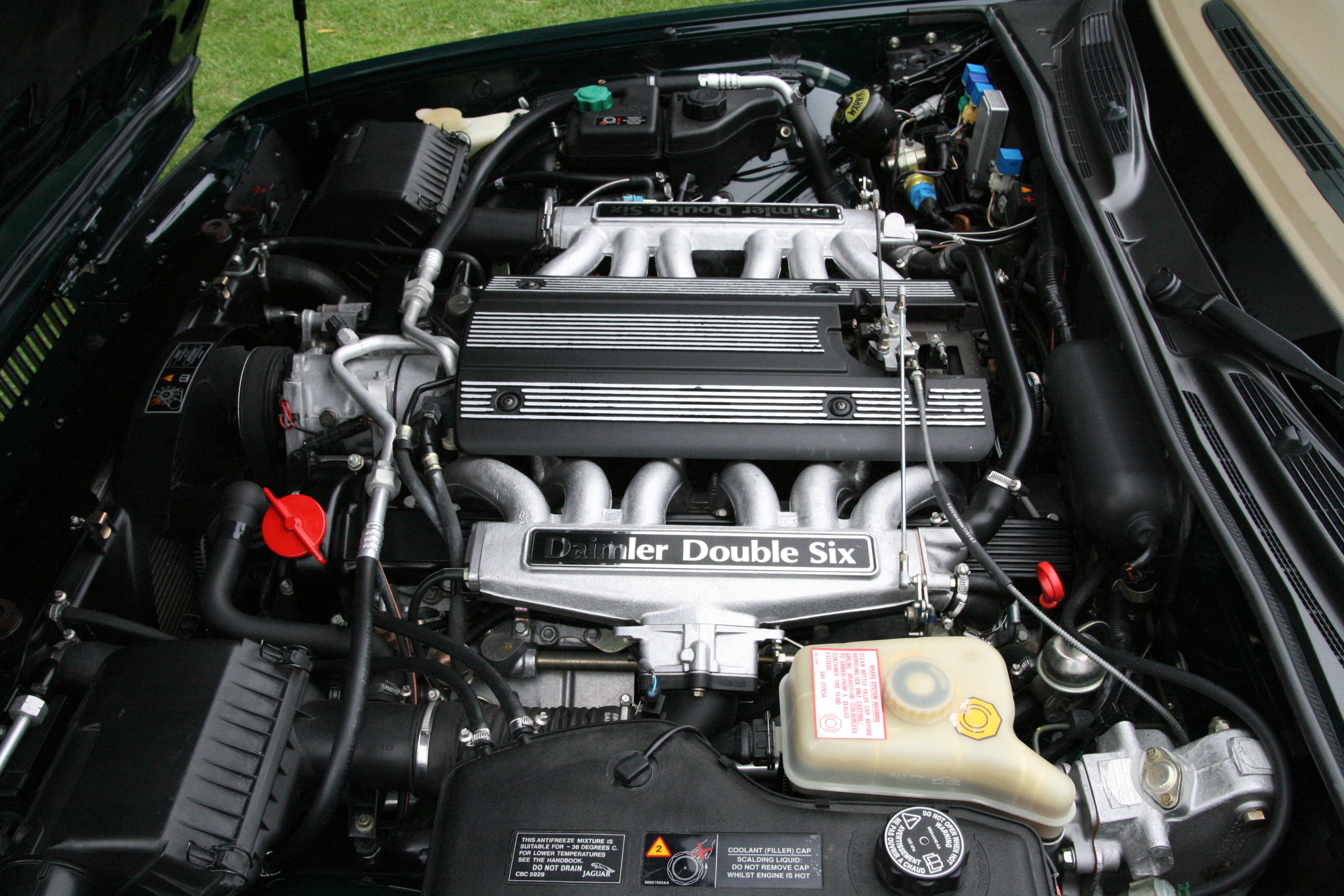
6.0-litre HE 1994 example

Daimler Double-Six Engine

- 5.3-litre (1972–1981)
- 5.3-litre HE (1981–1992)
- 6.0-litre HE (1993–1997)

== Cars ==
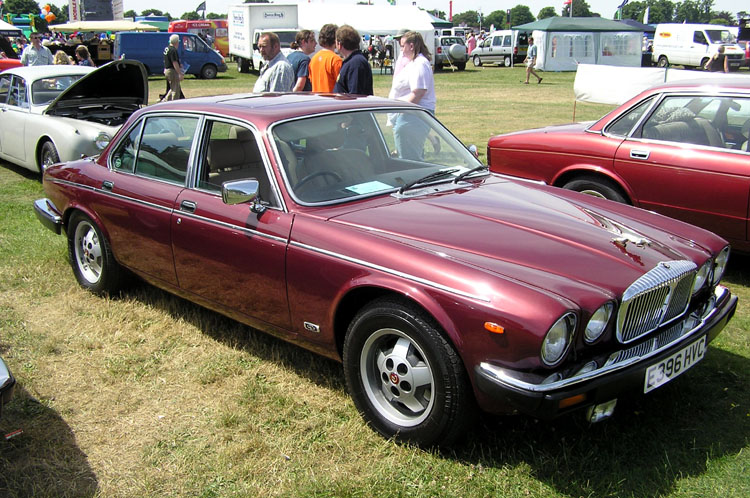
Daimler Double-Six SIII (1988 example)

Daimler Double-Six (1972–1992)
Daimler Double-Six XJ81 (1993–1994)
Daimler Double-Six X305 (1994–1997)
