= Jaguar AJ6 engine =

Jaguar AJ6
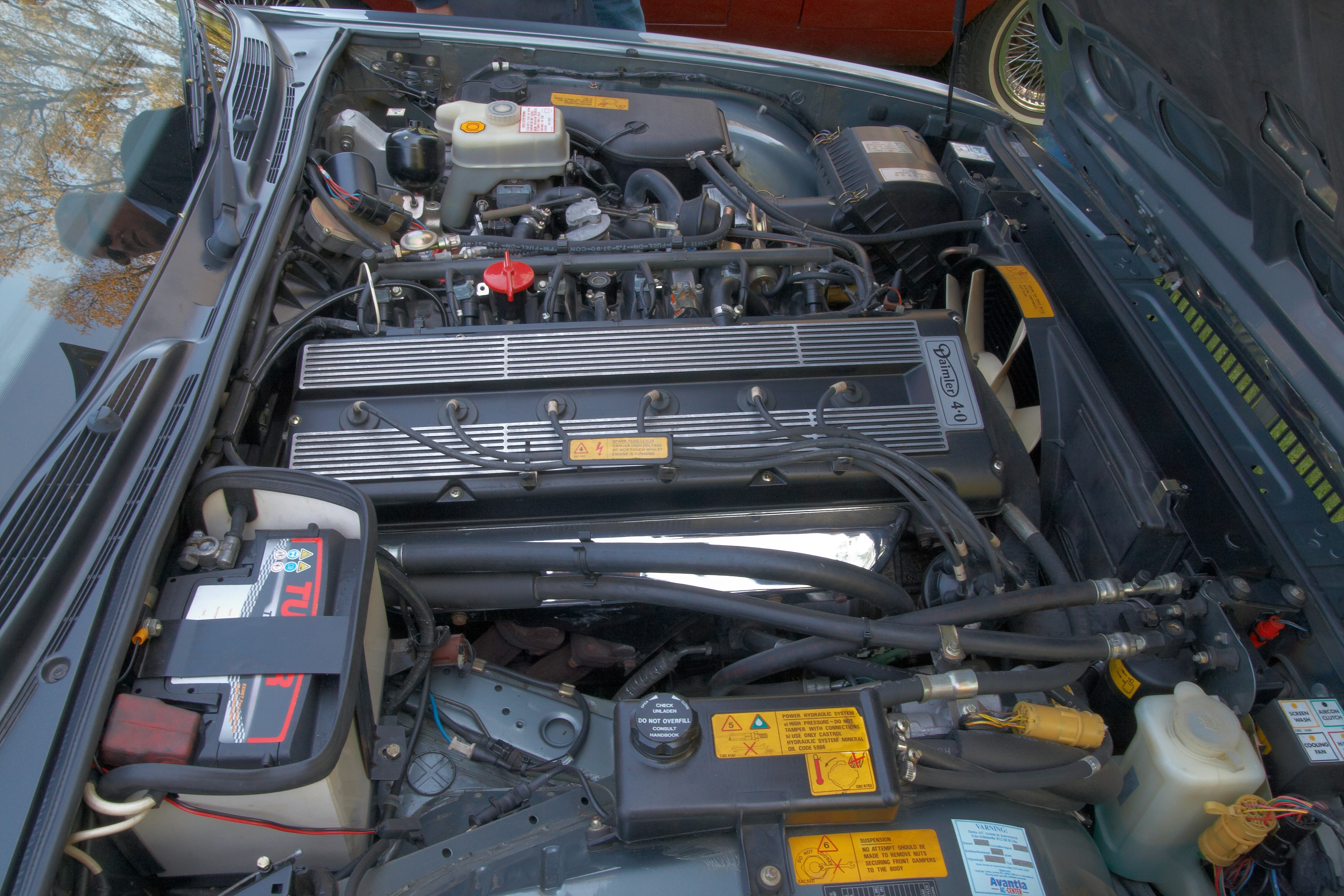

Overview
- Manufacturer: Jaguar Cars
- Production: 1984–1996

Layout
- Configuration: Straight-6
- Displacement: 2.9 L (2,919 cc); 3.2 L (3,239 cc); 3.6 L (3,590 cc); 4.0 L (3,980 cc)
- Cylinder bore: 91 mm (3.58 in)
- Piston stroke: 74.8 mm (2.94 in); 83 mm (3.27 in); 92 mm (3.62 in); 102 mm (4.02 in)
- Cylinder block material: Aluminium
- Cylinder head material: Aluminium
- Valvetrain: SOHC 2 valves x cyl. DOHC 4 valves x cyl.
- Compression ratio: 9.75:1

Combustion
- Supercharger: Eaton M90 (some versions)
- Turbocharger: Twin-turbo version developing 330bhp was developed for the prototype XJ41 sports car
- Fuel system: Lucas fuel injection
- Fuel type: Petrol
- Cooling system: Water cooled

Output
- Power output: 201–322 hp (150–240 kW; 204–326 PS)
- Torque output: 325–512 N⋅m (240–378 lb⋅ft)

Chronology
- Predecessor: Jaguar XK6
- Successor: Jaguar AJ-V6; Jaguar AJ-V8

The AJ6 (Advanced Jaguar 6-cylinder), and the similar AJ16, are inline-6 piston engines used by Jaguar cars in the 1980s and 1990s. The AJ6 was designed to replace the successful and long-used Jaguar XK6 engine, and was introduced in 1984. It was only the third all-new engine ever designed by the company. The AJ16 evolution was replaced in 1996 with the Jaguar developed AJ-V8 engine.

Jaguar had considered cutting their existing V12 in half to build a V6, or possibly a V8, but chose instead to develop a new inline six. The cylinders are inclined, as in a slant-6, by 22 degrees. It uses an aluminium block to reduce weight, and has an optional DOHC head for higher efficiency and power.

== AJ6 ==
The original engines were the DOHC 3.6 and the SOHC 2.9. The DOHC 3.6 was revised and enlarged to 4.0 in 1990. It is still essentially an "AJ6", however. This was, as per usual, offered for the XJ-S before it was built into the XJ40 saloon.

=== 3.6 ===
The 3.6 L (3,590 cc) was the first AJ6 engine, debuting in 1983 on the XJ-S. It had DOHC 4-valve heads with a 91 mm × 92 mm (3.58 in × 3.62 in) bore and stroke. Power was 165 kW (224 PS; 221 hp) with 325 N⋅m (240 lb⋅ft) of torque. Power was reduced to 201 hp (150 kW; 204 PS) for versions having catalytic exhaust system. Early versions of the 3.6 L (3,590 cc) AJ6 as used in the 1984 – 1987 XJ-S cars had a conventional distributor type of ignition system with electronics within the distributor body. This early AJ6 ignition system is nearly identical to the system used on the XK engine in the Series III XJ6 cars. The Lucas fuel injection system on the 3.6 L (3,590 cc) AJ6 engines in these early XJ-S cars sensed engine load using a Manifold Absolute Pressure (MAP) sensor just like the V12 cars from the same era. Later 3.6 L (3,590 cc) AJ6 engines as used in the 1986–1989 XJ40 cars had a crank-sensor type of ignition system with a bare distributor that only carried the spinning ignition rotor inside the distributor cap. The fuel-injection system used on the later 3.6 L (3,590 cc) AJ6 engines used a hot-wire Mass Air Flow sensor to determine engine load.

Vehicles using the 3.6 were:

- 1984–1989 Jaguar XJ-S
- 1986–1989 Jaguar XJ6
- 1986–1989 Jaguar XJ6 Sovereign
- 1986–1989 Daimler

=== 2.9 ===
The 2.9 L (2,919 cc) used a SOHC head from the Jaguar V12 engine, and was prone to failure. The block is the same as the 3.6, with the crankshaft and pistons lowering the stroke to 74.8 mm (2.94 in). Only the 1986–1989 Jaguar XJ6 used the 2.9. It was used for the entry-level XJ6 in Britain and Europe but rarely, if ever, seen in models exported to the US. The SOHC 2.9, which was generally considered somewhat underpowered for such a large car, was discontinued in late 1990 and replaced with a DOHC 3.2 (essentially identical to the DOHC 4.0).

The 2.9 Engine was, as in earlier years the 2.8 XK-engine, sized to match road-tax regulations in some European Countries like Italy or France. In France cars with more than 3 litres of engine size had to pay a luxury tax.

Unlike all other AJ6's, the 2.9l used Bosch LH Jetronic fuel injection and EZ-K ignition (rather than Lucas 9 or 15CU EMS)

=== 4.0 (1989–1994) ===
The 24-valve DOHC 4.0 L (3,980 cc) version replaced the 3.6 L (3,590 cc) AJ6 in 1989. It featured a longer 102 mm (4.02 in) stroke, and generated 183 kW (249 PS; 245 hp) power at 4,750 rpm and 392 N⋅m (289 lb⋅ft) of torque at 3,650 rpm. The 4.0 L (3,980 cc) engines as used in the 1990–1994 XJ40 cars continued with the crank sensor and empty distributor type of ignition system and the hot-wire Mass Air Flow sensor type of fuel injection control system as the 1988–1989 3.6 L (3,590 cc) XJ40 cars.

TWR modified XJ40s resulting in the XJR. Jaguarsport was also formed as a partnership between TWR and Jaguar. The first XJR, the XJR 3.6 L (3,590 cc), had extensive appearance changes coupled with stiffer suspension, anti-roll bar/links, power steering valve that reduced efficiency by 40% and an LSD but no performance enhancements. Interior-wise it included special stitching, "sport" or "XJR" embossed front headrests, and Jaguarsport speedometer labels and tread-plates.

1990 XJRs had the upgraded 4.0 litre engine with the old style body-kits, and appearance changers.

XJR 4.0Ls from 1990 on had all of the XJR 3.6 handling upgrades and benefits from engine enhancements such as high lift cams, improved double plenum inlet manifold, and a compression ratio of 9.75:1. They were sent to TWR in Coventry to be modified directly after being produced.

Total XJ40 cars built was 208,733 and supposedly 500 JaguarSport cars built, 200 of the round headlight versions and then about 300 with the square headlights like the Sovereigns and Daimler's. 1990+ XJR power output is around 250 bhp (186 kW; 253 PS) / 278 lb⋅ft (377 N⋅m).

The prototype Jaguar XJ41/42 sports car used a twin-turbo version of the AJ6 4.0, developing 330bhp.

=== 3.2 (1990–1994) ===
A 24-valve DOHC 3.2 L (3,239 cc), essentially a shorter-stroke of 83 mm (3.27 in) 4.0 L (3,980 cc), replaced the 12-valve SOHC 2.9 in 1990. It produced 149 kW (203 PS; 200 hp) of power at 5,250 rpm and 298 N⋅m (220 lb⋅ft) of torque at 4,000 rpm, and proved a popular engine in Europe (sales outnumbered 4.0 L (3,980 cc) saloons roughly 4:1) but was not exported to America.

Following the launch of the Aston Martin DB7, the Jaguar AJ6 was used by Aston Martin as well (both companies being owned by Ford at the time). This version featured an Eaton supercharger.

Cars using the 4.0 and 3.2 included:

- Jaguar XJS (4.0 only)
- Aston Martin DB7 (modified, supercharged 3.2)
- Jaguar XJ6
- Jaguar Sovereign
- Jaguar XJR (4.0 only)
- Daimler Six

== AJ16 ==
Both the 3.2 and 4.0 were substantially revised for the 1995 launch of the renewed Jaguar XJ (X300) saloon. These are the "AJ16" engines, both featuring coil-on-plug distributorless ignition, new engine management systems, magnesium alloy valve covers, revised pistons and other detail changes. The AJ16 was discontinued with the launch of the AJ-V8 (XK8 and XJ8 in 1996/7).

=== 4.0 / 3.2 (1994–1997) ===
For the launch of the new X300 saloon for 1995, substantial revisions were made to the 4.0 L (3,980 cc) and 3.2 L (3,239 cc) AJ6 engines. The new design was called the AJ16 to reflect the major differences between it and the original AJ6.

Cars using the 4.0 and 3.2 included:

- Jaguar XJS (4.0 only)
- Jaguar XJ6
- Jaguar XJ6 Sovereign
- Jaguar XJ6 Sport
- Daimler

=== AJ16S ===
A supercharged version of the 4.0 L (3,980 cc) AJ16 was released in 1994 in the Jaguar XJR which used an Eaton M90 blower to boost output to 240 kW (326 PS; 322 hp) and 512 N⋅m (378 lb⋅ft)

== See also ==
- Jaguar XK6 engine
- Jaguar V12 engine
- Jaguar AJ-V6 engine
