= XJR =

XJR may refer to:

- Jaguar XJR
- Postal code for Xgħajra, Malta
