= Jaguar XJ =

Series of British luxury cars (1968–2019)

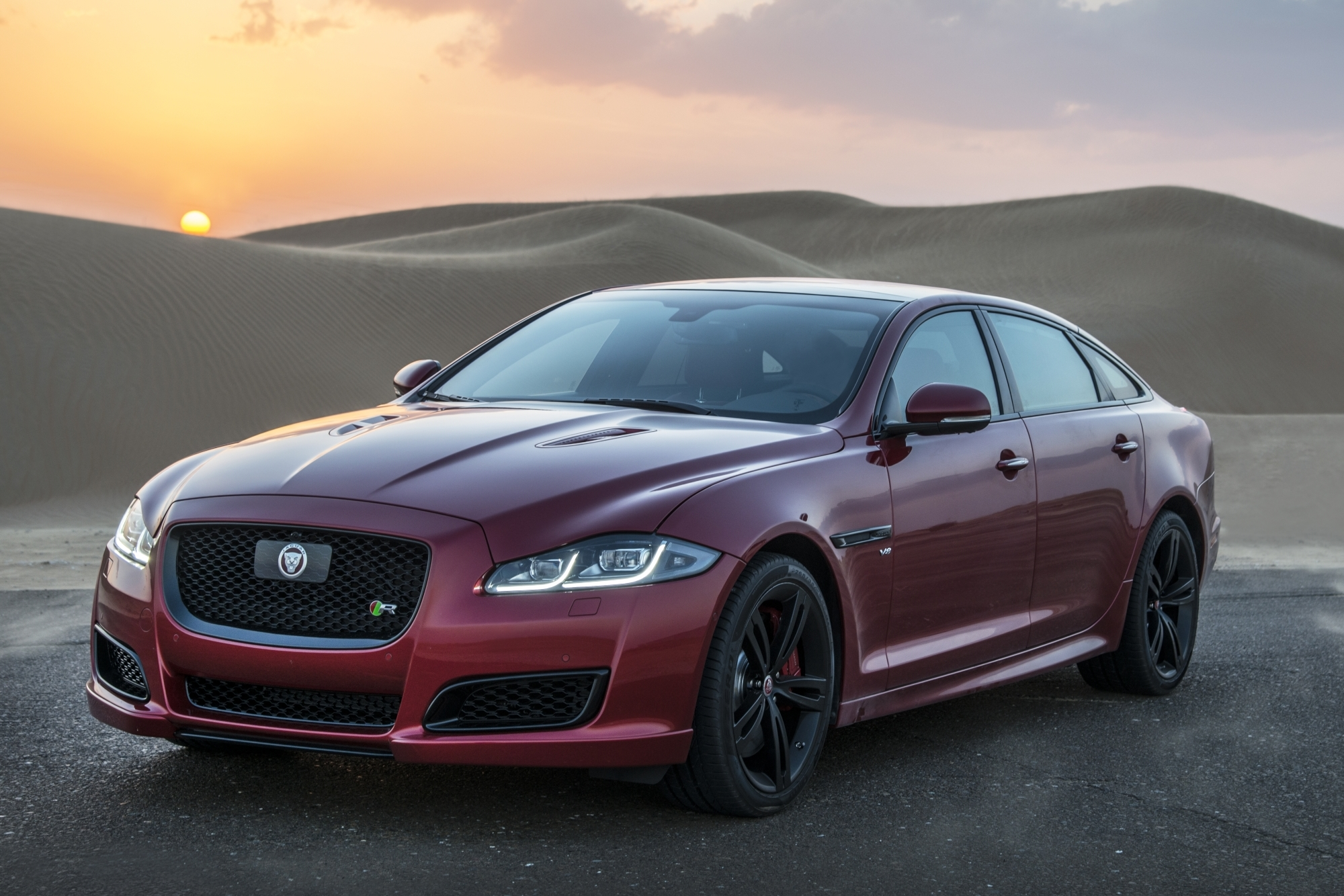
- 2015 Jaguar XJR (X351)

Overview
- Manufacturer: Jaguar Cars
- Production: 1968–2019

Body and chassis
- Class: Executive car (E) (until 2003); Full-size luxury car (F)
- Layout: Front-engine, rear-wheel-drive

The Jaguar XJ is a series of full-size luxury cars produced from 1968 to 2019 by British automobile manufacturer Jaguar Cars (becoming Jaguar Land Rover in 2013). It was produced across four basic platform generations (debuting in 1968, 1986, 2003, and 2009) with various updated derivatives of each. From 1970, it was Jaguar's flagship four-door model. A two-door Coupé was also available. The original model was the last Jaguar saloon to have been designed under the leadership of Sir William Lyons, the company's founder, and the model has been featured in a myriad of media and high-profile appearances.

== Series 1, 2, and 3 (1968–1992) ==
The first generation Jaguar XJ was produced for a total period of 24 years, with two major facelifts – in 1973 and in 1979, with a raised front bumper and less tall grilles.

For four years, the 1968 introduced XJ (later known as the Series 1) was a four-door, straight-six saloon on a 2.76 m (108.75 in) wheelbase. In 1972, a more spacious, 4-inch (10 cm) longer wheelbase (LWB) option, and a 5.3 litre V12 engine were added. On the XJ series 2 (from 1973), the standard wheelbase (SWB) saloons were cancelled in 1974 – but a SWB two-door (series II only) coupé was sold from 1975–1978.

The 1979 series 3 saloons received a redesigned greenhouse (upper body) and bumpers. The 6-cylinder series 3 models were replaced by the second generation Jaguar XJ in 1987, but the V12 models were not replaced until 1992.

=== Series 1 (1968–1973) ===
XJ Series I
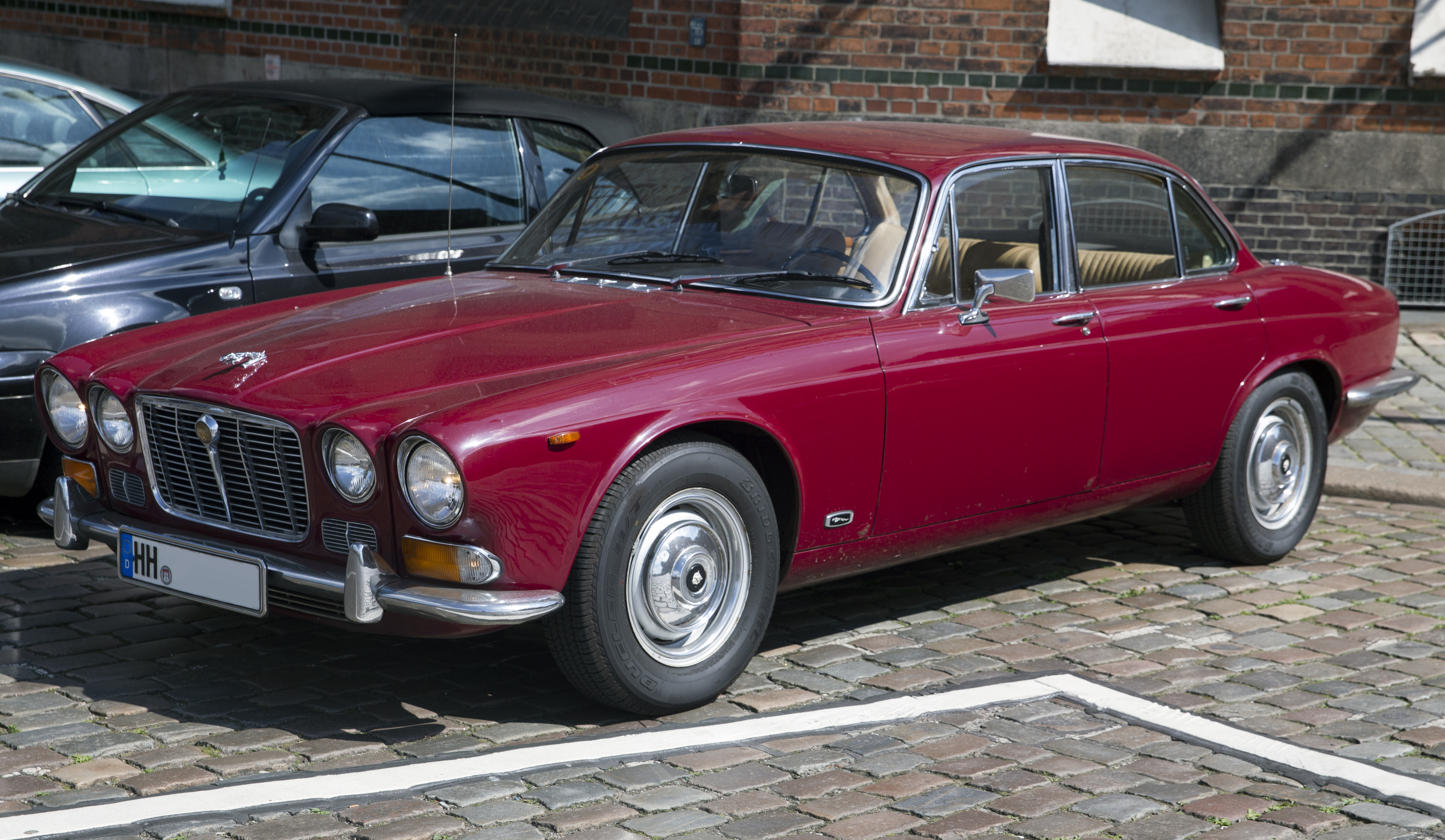

Overview
- Also called: Jaguar XJ6/XJ12; Daimler Sovereign; Daimler Double-Six
- Production: 1968–1973; 82,126 produced
- Assembly: United Kingdom: Coventry, England
- Designer: William Heynes, William Lyons

Body and chassis
- Body style: 4-door saloon

Powertrain
- Engine: 2.8 L XK I6; 4.2 L XK I6; 5.3 L Jaguar V12 (from 1972)
- Transmission: 3-speed Borg-Warner Model 8 automatic (1968–1970); 3-speed Borg-Warner Model 12 automatic (1970 onwards); Manual 4 speed +OD available on I6 models

Dimensions
- Wheelbase: 2,762 mm (108.75 in); LWB (sold from 1972): 2,864 mm (112.75 in)
- Length: 4,813 mm (189.5 in); LWB (sold from 1972): 4,915 mm (193.5 in)
- Width: 1,772 mm (69.75 in)
- Height: 1,340 mm (52.75 in)

Chronology
- Predecessor: Jaguar 240, Jaguar 340; Daimler 250; Jaguar S-Type; Jaguar 420 and Daimler Sovereign; Jaguar 420G

The XJ6 replaced most of Jaguar's saloons – which, in the 1960s, had expanded to four separate ranges. It carried over the 2.8-litre (2,792 cc (170.4 cu in)) and 4.2-litre (4,235 cc (258.4 cu in)) versions of Jaguar's renowned straight-six XK engine, and front and rear suspensions, from previous models: the widest version of Jaguar's IRS unit from the Mark X, and the subframe-mounted independent front suspension first seen in the 1955 Mark 1, with new anti-dive geometry.

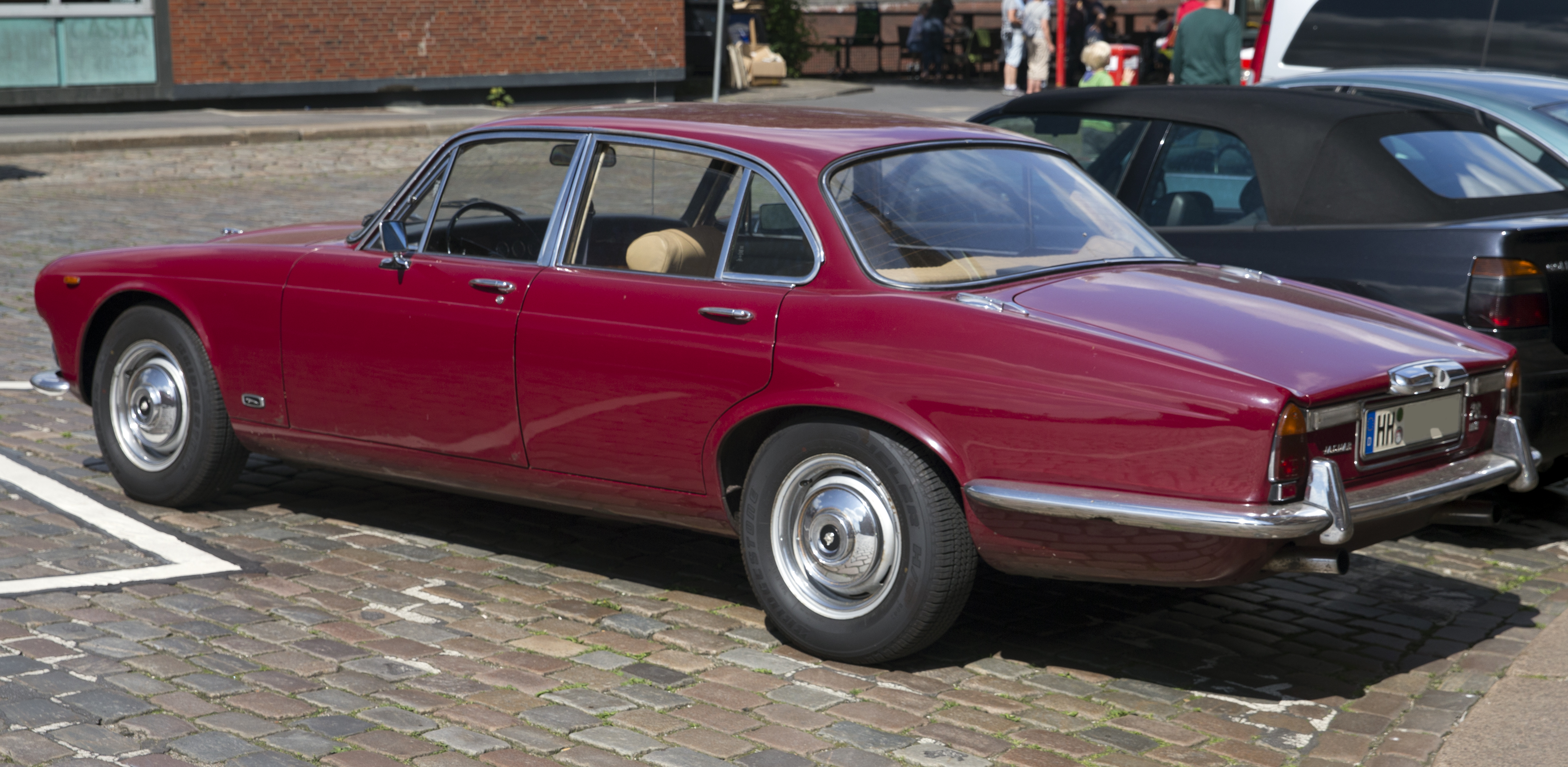
Series 1 Jaguar XJ6 rear

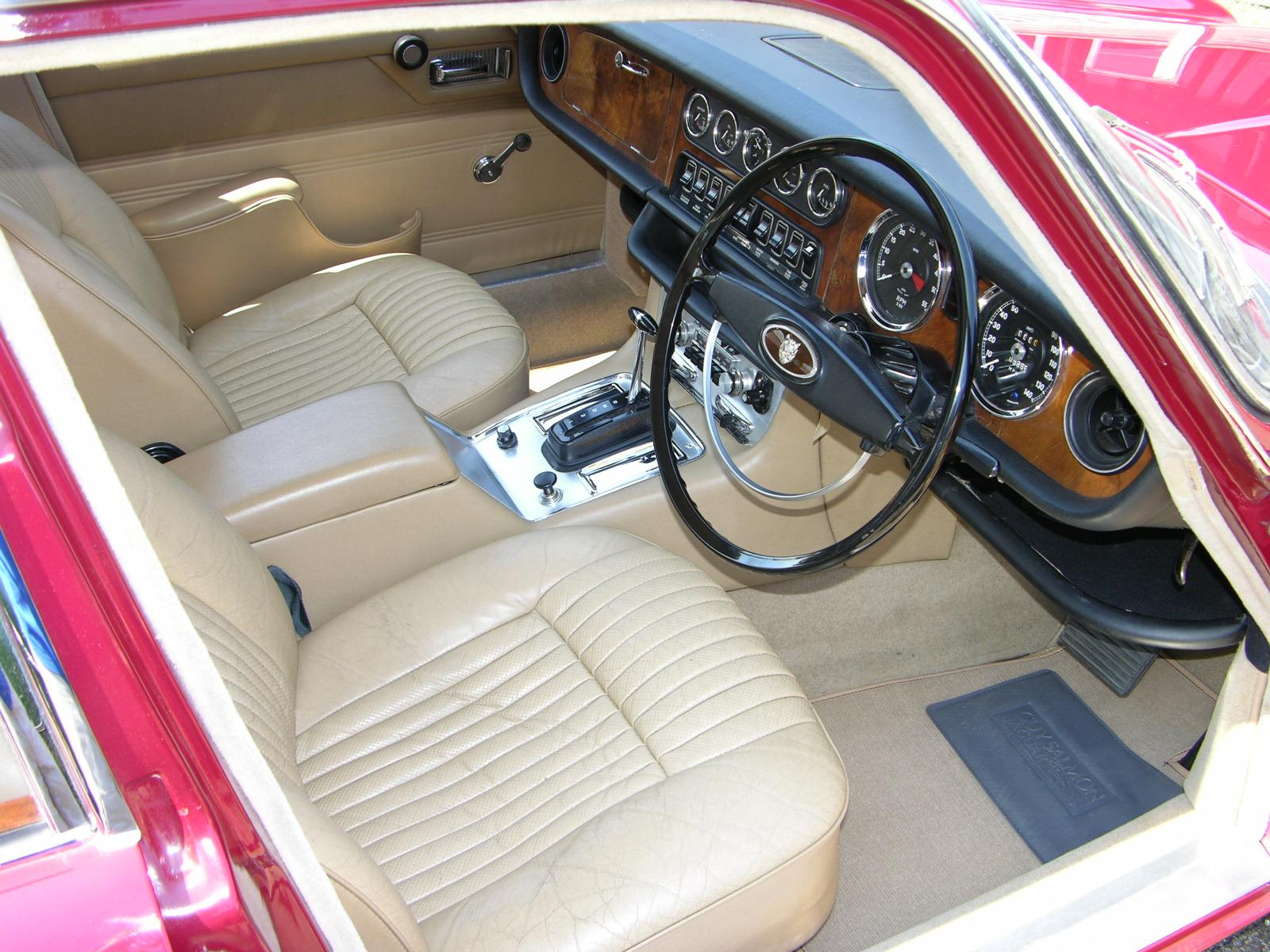
Series 1 Jaguar XJ6 interior

An upmarket version was marketed as the Daimler Sovereign, continuing the name from the Daimler version of the Jaguar 420. The car was introduced in September 1968. Power-assisted steering and leather upholstery were standard on the 2.8 L De Luxe and 4.2 L models. Air conditioning was offered as an optional extra on the 4.2 L Daimler versions, which were launched in October 1969 in a series of television advertisements featuring Sir William. In these advertisements, he referred to the car as "the finest Jaguar ever". An unusual feature inherited from the Mark X and S-Type saloons was the twin fuel tanks, positioned on each side of the boot, and filled using two separately lockable filler caps: one on the top of each wing above the rear wheel arches. Preliminary reviews of the car were favourable, noting the effective brakes and good ride quality.

In March 1970, it was announced that the Borg-Warner Model 8 automatic transmission, which the XJ6 had featured since 1968, would be replaced on the 4.2-litre XJ6 with the Borg-Warner Model 12. The new transmission had three different forward positions accessed via the selector lever, which effectively enabled performance oriented drivers to hold lower ratios at higher revs to achieve better acceleration. "Greatly improved shift quality" was also claimed for the new system. Around this time other, minor changes were made as well, such as moving the rear reflectors from beside to below the rear lights; on the interior the chrome gauge bezels were replaced with black ones, to cut down on distracting reflections. In 1972, the option of a long-wheelbase version, providing a 4-inch increase in leg room for passengers on the rear seats, became available.

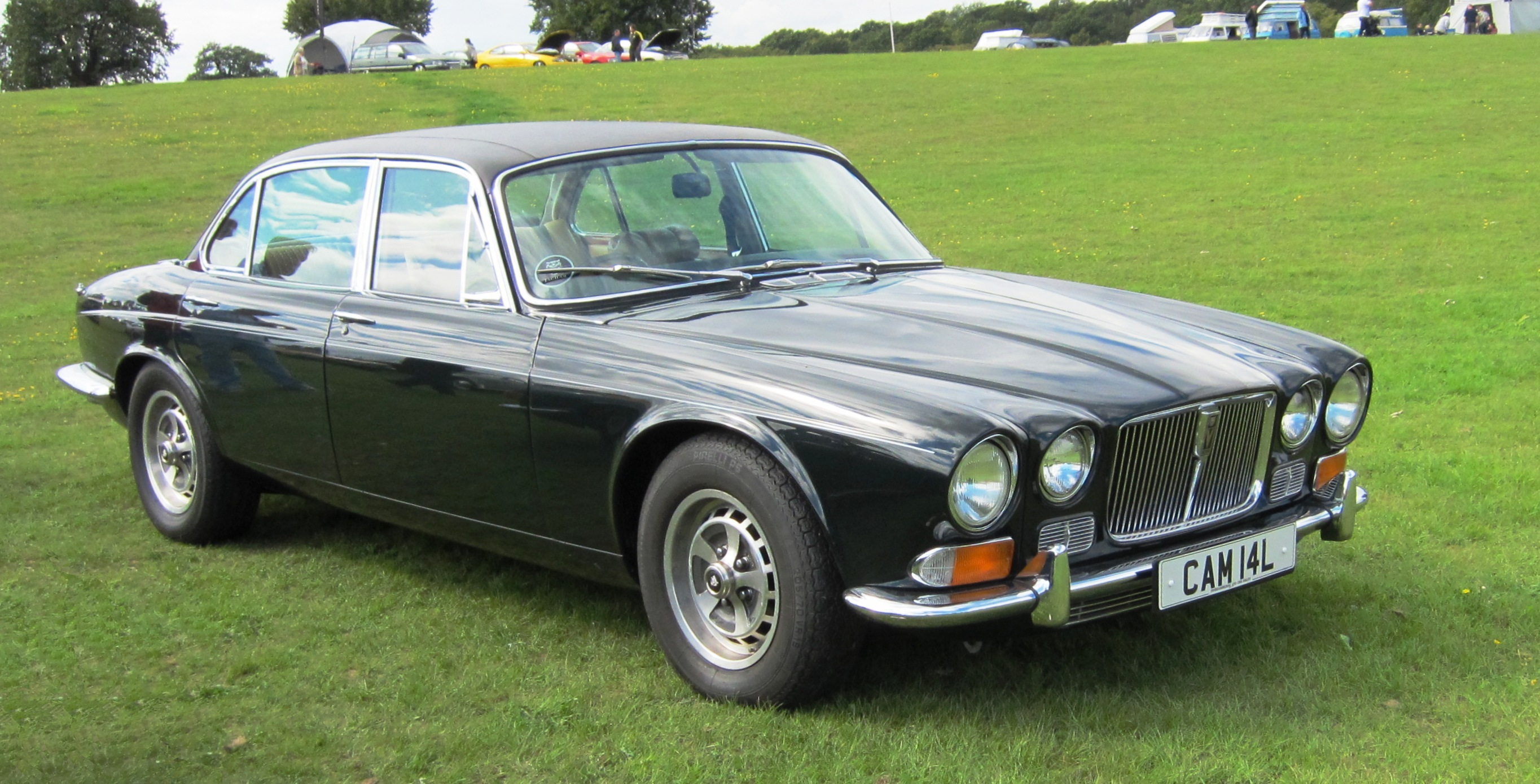
The Jaguar XJ12, launched during the summer of 1972, featured a simplified grille.

A high-performance version called the XJ12 was announced in July 1972, featuring a simplified grille treatment, and powered by a Jaguar's 5.3 L V12 engine coupled to the Borg-Warner Model 12 transmission. At the time, it was the only mass-produced 12-cylinder, four-door car in the world and, with a top speed of "around" 225 km/h (140 mph), it was the "fastest full four-seater available in the world".

Although it had been the manufacturer's intention from launch that the XJ would use the 12-cylinder engine its installation was nonetheless a tight fit, and providing adequate cooling had been a challenge for Jaguar's engineers. Bonnet louvres such as those fitted on the 12-cylinder E-Type were rejected and instead the XJ12 featured a complex "cross-flow" radiator divided into two separated horizontal sections supported with coolant feeder tanks at each end. The engine fan was geared to rotate at 1¼ times the speed of the engine, subject to a limiter which cut in at a fan speed of 1,700 rpm. The fuel system incorporated a relief valve that returned fuel to the tank when pressure in the lines to the carburettors exceeded 1.5 psi, to reduce the risk of vapour locks occurring at the high operating temperatures, while the car's battery had its own thermostatically-controlled cooling fan.

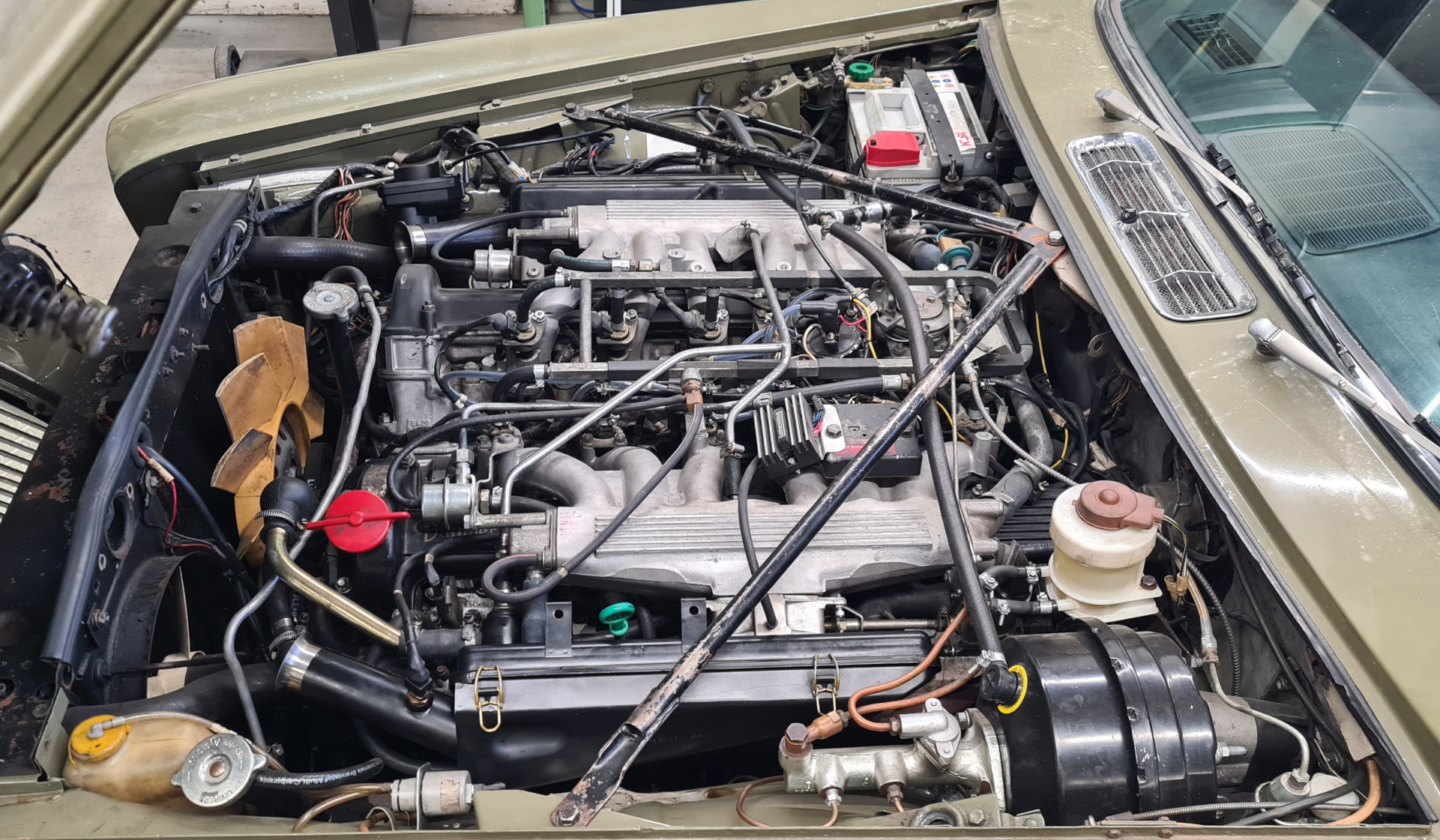
Injection engine in a Series 1 XJ12

3,228 Series 1 XJ12s were built. A badge-engineered version, the Daimler Double-Six, was introduced in 1972, reviving the Daimler model name of 1926–1938.

Total production figures for the Series 1
Model	Production
Jaguar XJ6 2.8 swb	19,322
Jaguar XJ6 4.2 swb	59,077
Jaguar XJ6 4.2 lwb	574
Jaguar XJ12 swb	2,474
Jaguar XJ12 lwb	754
Daimler Sovereign 2.8	3,233
Daimler Sovereign 4.2 swb	11,522
Daimler Sovereign 4.2 lwb	386
Daimler Double Six swb	534
Daimler Double Six Vanden Plas	351
Total Production for Series 1	98,227

=== Series 2 (1973–1979) ===
XJ Series II
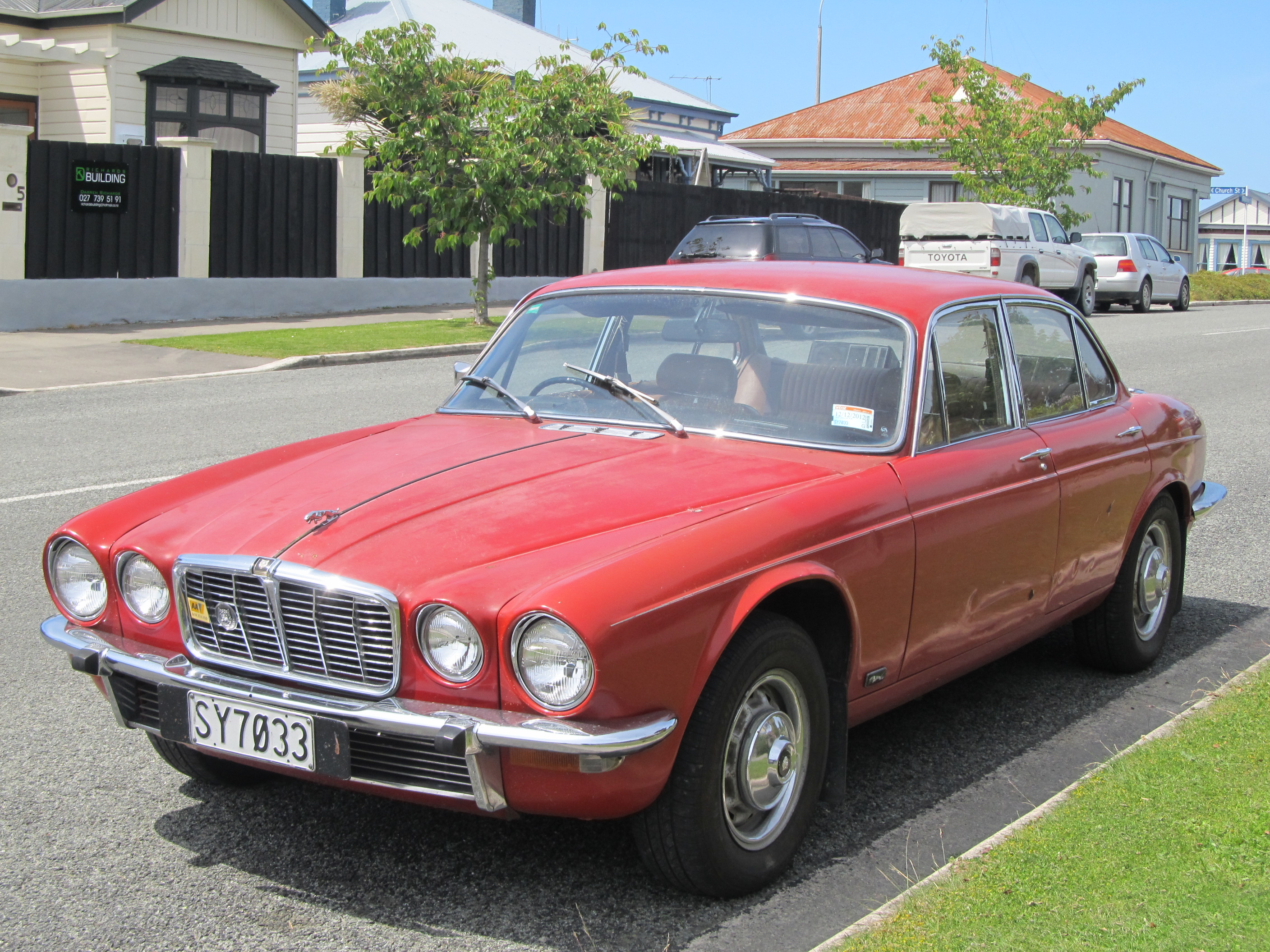

Overview
- Also called: Jaguar XJ6 and XJ12; Jaguar XJ 3.4, XJ 4.2 and XJ 5.3; Daimler Sovereign; Daimler Double-Six
- Production: 1973–1979; Until 1981 (South Africa); 91,227 produced
- Assembly: United Kingdom: Coventry, England; South Africa: Cape Town (Leykor); New Zealand: Nelson (NZMC)
- Designer: William Heynes

Body and chassis
- Body style: 4-door saloon

Powertrain
- Engine: 2.8 L XK I6; 3.4 L XK I6; 4.2 L XK I6; 5.3 L Jaguar V12
- Transmission: 3-speed Borg-Warner Model 12 automatic; 3-speed General Motors THM 400 automatic (XJ12, from 1977 onwards); Manual 4 speed+OD available on I6 models

Dimensions
- Wheelbase: SWB (only sold until 1974): 2,762 mm (108.75 in); LWB (until 1974: thereafter all saloons): 2,864 mm (112.75 in)
- Length: 4,947 mm (194.75 in)
- Width: 1,772 mm (69.75 in)
- Height: 1,372 mm (54 in)
- Kerb weight: 1,742 kg (3,841 lb)

The XJ line received a facelift in Autumn 1973 for the 1974 model year, thereafter known as the Series II; retrospectively the earlier cars were referred to as the Series I. The 4.2 L XJ6 straight-6 engine (most popular in the United Kingdom) and the 5.3 L V12 XJ12 were continued with an addition of a 3.4 L (3,442 cc; 210.0 cu in) version of the XK engine available from 1975. The Series II and Series II coupé were the last Jaguar models with direct input by Sir William Lyons before his retirement.

Initially, the Series II was offered with two wheelbases, but at the 1974 London Motor Show Jaguar announced the withdrawal of the standard wheelbase version: subsequent saloons all featured the extra 4 inches (10 cm) of passenger cabin length hitherto featured only on the long-wheelbase model. By this time, the first customer deliveries of the two-door coupe, which retained the shorter standard-wheelbase (and which had already been formally launched more than a year earlier) were only months away.

Series II cars are visually differentiated from their predecessors by raised front bumpers to meet US crash safety regulations, which necessitated a smaller grille, complemented by a discreet additional inlet directly below the bumper. The interior received a substantial update, including simplified heating and A/C systems to address criticisms of the complex and not very effective Series I systems.

In April 1975, the North American models got a slightly revised set of front bumpers which had rubber over-riders covering the full length of the bumper with embedded turn signals at each end, and the Zenith-Stromberg carburettors of the V12-powered cars were replaced by Bosch-Lucas electronic fuel injection. In 1978 the carburettors were similarly replaced with EFI in the 4.2 L 6-cylinder XJ6L. In May 1977, it was announced that the 12-cylinder engine would receive the General Motors' three-speed Turbo-Hydramatic 400 automatic transmission in place of the British-built Borg-Warner.

The 1978 UK model range included the Jaguar XJ 3.4, XJ 4.2, XJ 5.3, Daimler Sovereign 4.2, Double-Six 5.3, Daimler Vanden Plas 4.2 and Double-Six Vanden Plas 5.3. In New Zealand, knock-down kits of the Series II were assembled locally by the New Zealand Motor Corporation (NZMC) at their Nelson plant. In the last year of production in New Zealand (1978), a special 'SuperJag' (XJ6-SLE) model was produced which featured half leather, half dralon wide pleat seats, vinyl roof, chrome steel wheels and air conditioning as standard. New Zealand produced models featured speedometers in km/h, and the black vinyl mats sewn onto the carpets in the front footwells featured the British Leyland L logo.

Though worldwide production of the Series II ended in 1979, a number were produced in Cape Town, South Africa until 1981. A total of 91,227 Series II models were produced, of which 14,226 were fitted with the V12 engine.

Engines

Years	Type	Capacity	Horsepower
1973–1975	DOHC I-6	2,792 (171 cu. in.)	140 Cv/Din
1975–1979	DOHC I-6	3,442 (210 cu. in.)	160 Cv/Din
1973–1979	DOHC I-6	4,235 (258 cu. in.)	186 Cv/Din - 172 Cv/Din _{See Note}
1973–1979	SOHC V12	5,343 (326 cu. in.)	269 Cv/Din _{See Note}

Note that HP varies depending on emission standards imposed on particular vehicles

Production count

Year	XJ6	XJ12
1973	1,488	168
1974	13,526	4,744
1975	11,990	2,239
1976	12,157	3,283
1977	9,043	1,913
1978	12,138	3,284
1979	1,099	429
Total	61,441	16,060

Short–long wheelbase

Model	Swb	Lwb
Jaguar XJ6 3.4	—	6,490
Jaguar XJ6 4.2	12,370	50,912
Jaguar XJ12 5.3	—	14,226
Total	12,370	71,628

=== XJ Coupé ===
XJ-Coupé
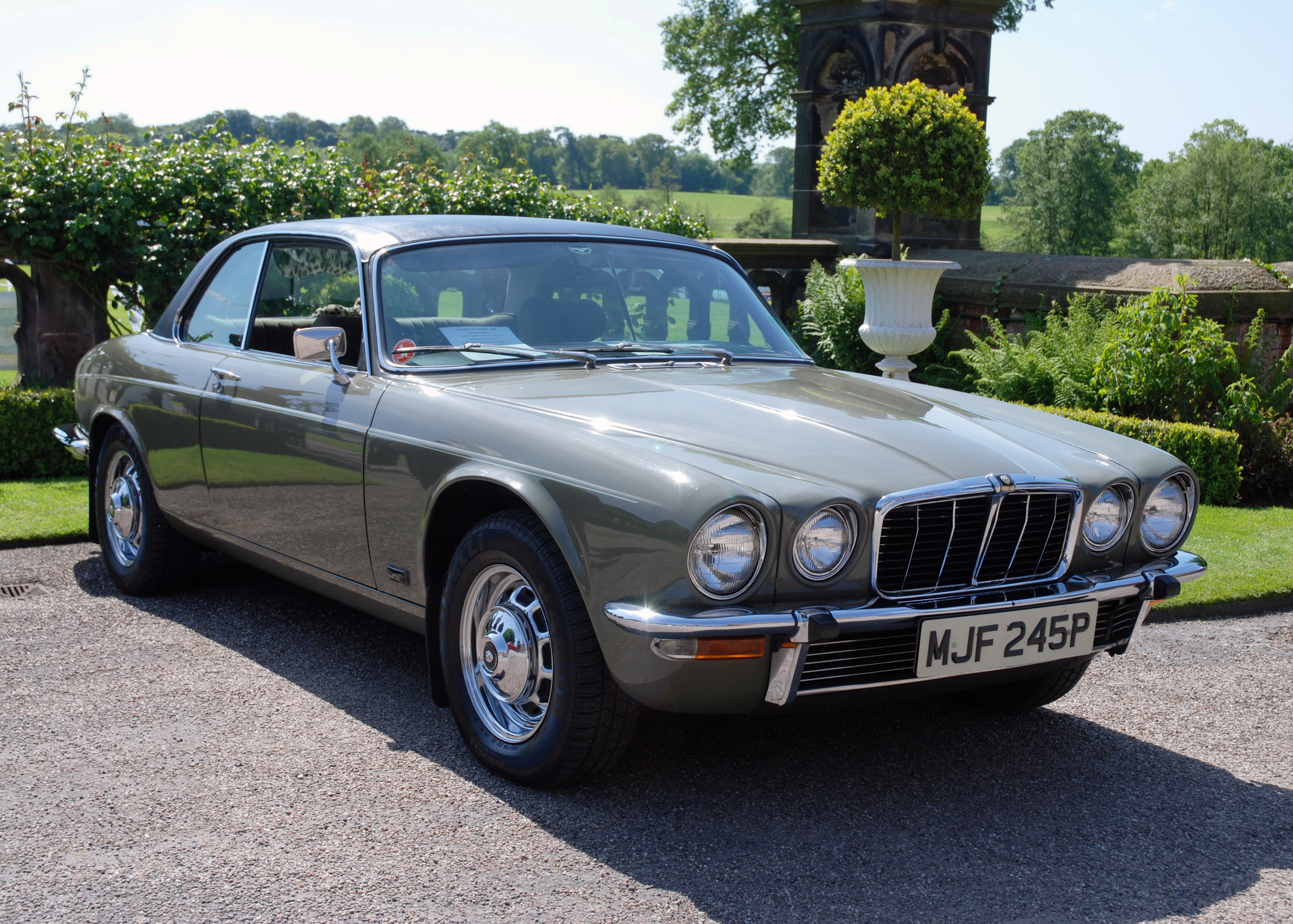

Overview
- Also called: Jaguar XJ-C, XJ6-C, XJ12-C; Jaguar XJ4.2C; Jaguar XJ5.3C; Daimler Sovereign Coupé; Daimler Double-Six Coupé
- Production: 1975–1978; 10,487 produced
- Assembly: United Kingdom: Coventry, England
- Designer: William Heynes

Body and chassis
- Body style: 2-door coupé

Powertrain
- Engine: 4.2 L XK I6; 5.3 L Jaguar V12

Dimensions
- Wheelbase: 2,762 mm (108.75 in)
- Length: 4,845 mm (190.75 in)
- Width: 1,772 mm (69.75 in)
- Height: 1,375 mm (54.125 in)
- Kerb weight: 1,837 kg (4,050 lb)

Chronology
- Successor: Jaguar XJS (Indirect)

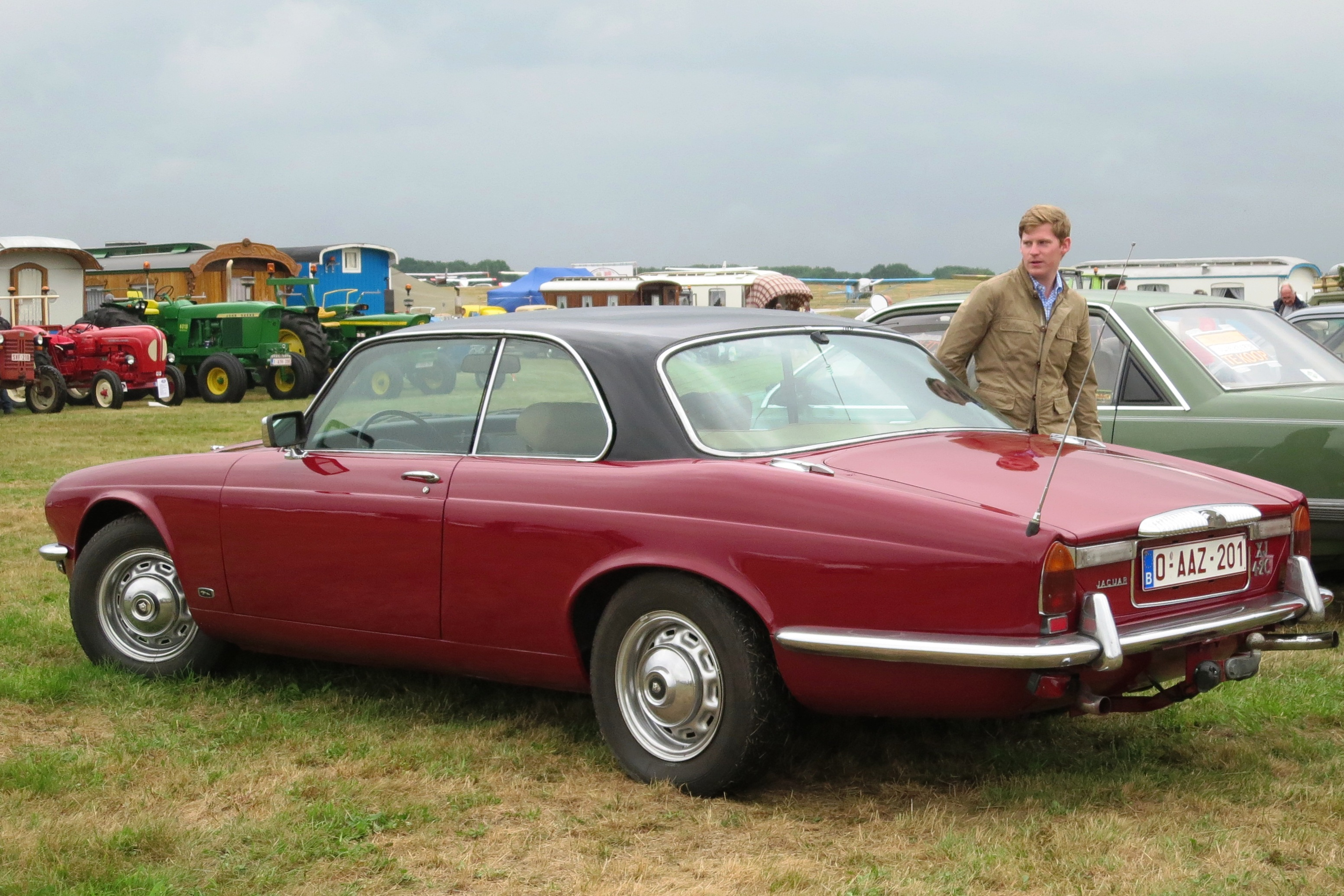
Jaguar XJ Coupé rear

A 9,378 car production run of two-door XJ coupés with a pillarless hardtop body called the XJ-C was built between 1975 and November 1977, in addition to about 2,000 Daimler-badged examples. The car was originally shown at the London Motor Show in October 1973, but it subsequently became clear that it was not ready for production. The economic troubles resulting from the 1973 oil crisis unfolding in the Western world at that time seemed to have reduced any sense of urgency about producing and selling the cars. Amongst other productionisation problems, sealing the frameless windows caused delays. XJ coupés finally started to appear in Jaguar showrooms some two years later. The coupé was based on the short-wheelbase version of the XJ. The coupé's elongated doors were made out of a lengthened standard XJ front door (the weld seams are clearly visible under the interior panels where two front door shells were grafted together with a single outer skin). A few XJ-C cars were modified by Lynx Cars and Avon into a convertible body style with a retractable canvas top, but this was not a factory product. Lynx conversions (16 in total) did benefit from powered tops. Both six and twelve-cylinder models were offered, 6,505 of the former and 1,873 of the latter were made. Even with the delays, these cars suffered from water leaks and wind noise. The delayed introduction, the labour-intensive work required by the modified saloon body, the higher price than the four-door car, and the early demise promulgated by the new XJ-S, all ensured a small production run.

All coupés came with a vinyl roof as standard. Since the coupé lacked B-pillars, the roof flexed enough that the paint used by Jaguar at the time would develop cracks. More modern paints do not suffer such problems, so when coupés are repainted it is advisable to remove the vinyl. Today many XJ-Cs thus no longer have their vinyl roof, which also minimises the threat of roof rust. Some owners also modified their XJ-C by changing to Series III bumpers. This lifted the front indicators from under the bumper and provided built in rear fog lights. A small number of Daimler versions of the XJ-C were made. One prototype of the Daimler Vanden Plas XJ-C was also made; however, this version never went into production.

Production count

Model \ Year	1973	1974	1975	1976	1977	1978	Total
4.2 L Coupé	2	1	2,925	1,746	1,776	37	6,487
5.3 L Coupé	—	11	821	663	329	31	1,855
Daimler Sovereign Coupé	—	—	471	587	613	6	1,677
Daimler Double Six Coupé	—	1	76	149	159	22	407
Total	2	13	4,293	3,145	2,877	96	10,426

==== In competition ====
The XJC was also raced, although the results were less than satisfying - memories of the failed effort made British Leyland decline to provide factory backing for the TWR-prepared XJS five years later. The XJ12C racing car was developed for the European Touring Car Championship by Ralph Broad of Broadspeed. With Derek Bell at the wheel, it briefly led its debut race, the RAC Tourist Trophy at Silverstone in September 1976, but failed to finish. This became the modus operandi for the XJC racing effort: Overweight and unreliable, the best result was a second place at Nürburgring in 1977 and British Leyland cancelled the program before completing the season. BMW won every single race in the 1977 ETCC season. Jaguar did put in significant effort, spending four weeks in testing to solve the lubrication issues which sidelined the cars at Monza in time for Salzburgring. The efforts seemed to pay off as Jaguar took pole position, only for their race to end after 35 minutes with rear suspension failure on both cars. Jaguar ended up sitting out the next two races as they tried to come to grips with failing driveshafts.

European Touring Car Championship results
Year	Entrant	Driver	Class	1	2	3	4	5	6	7	8	9	10	11	Points
Year	Entrant	Driver	Class	MONZ	SALZ	MUG	PERG	BRNO	NÜR	ZAN	SIL	ZOL	JAR	EST	Points
1977	British Leyland	Derek Bell; Andy Rouse	Gr. 5	Ret	Ret	DNS	DNS	Ret	2 (2)	Ret	4 (4)	Ret	–	–	25
1977	British Leyland	John Fitzpatrick; Tim Schenken	Gr. 5	Ret	Ret	DNS	DNS	16 (3)	Ret	Ret	Ret	Ret	–	–	0
Class finish in parenthesis. Source:

=== Series 3 (1979–1992) ===
XJ Series III
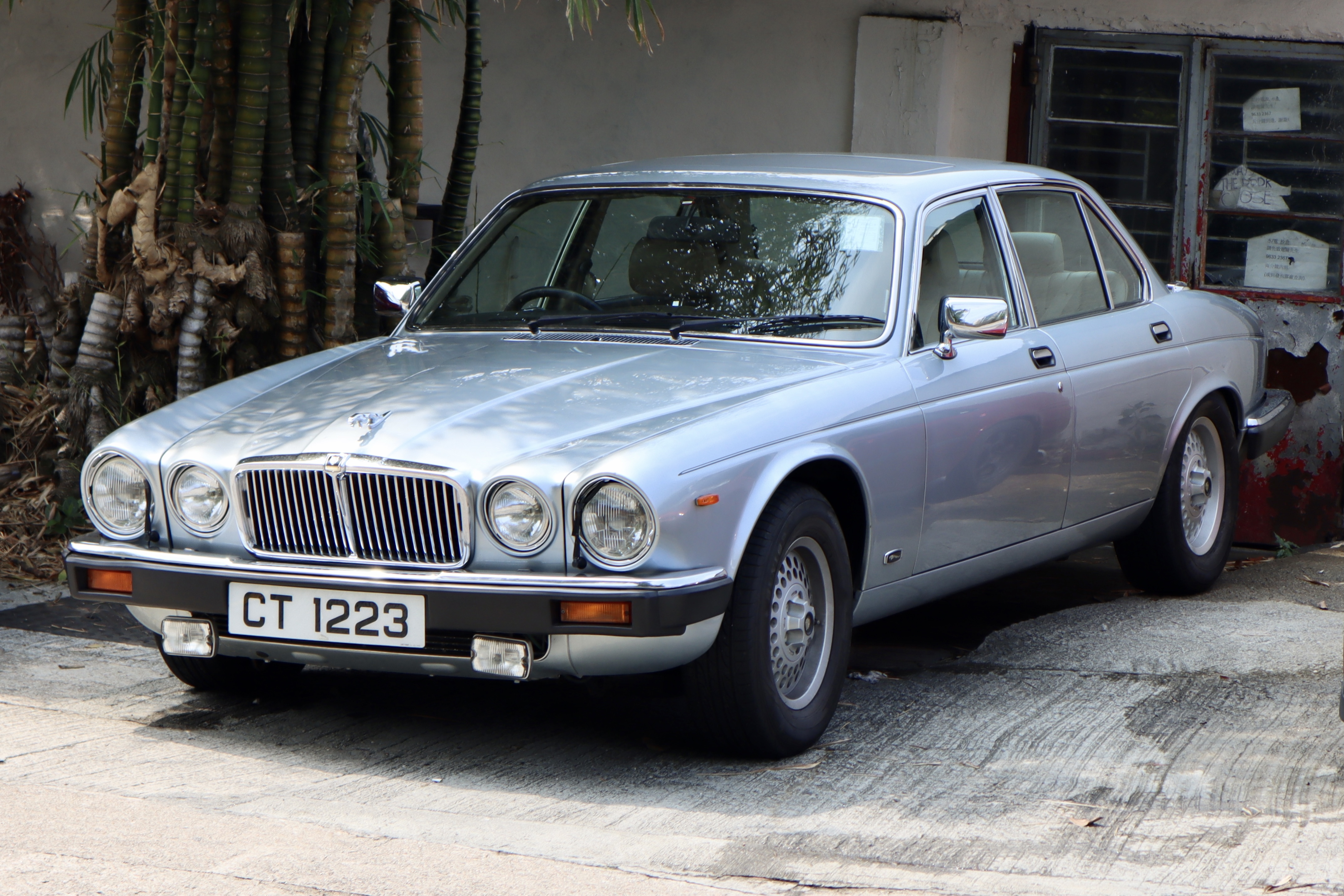
- Jaguar XJ12 Series III

Overview
- Also called: Jaguar XJ6, XJ12; Daimler Sovereign; Daimler Vanden Plas; Daimler Double-Six; Double-Six Vanden Plas; Jaguar Sovereign (from 1983); Jaguar Vanden Plas
- Production: March 1979 – 30 November 1992; 132,952 produced
- Assembly: United Kingdom: Coventry, England
- Designer: Leonardo Fioravanti and Lorenzo Ramaciotti at Pininfarina

Body and chassis
- Body style: 4-door saloon

Powertrain
- Engine: 3.4 L XK I6; 4.2 L XK I6; 5.3 L Jaguar V12

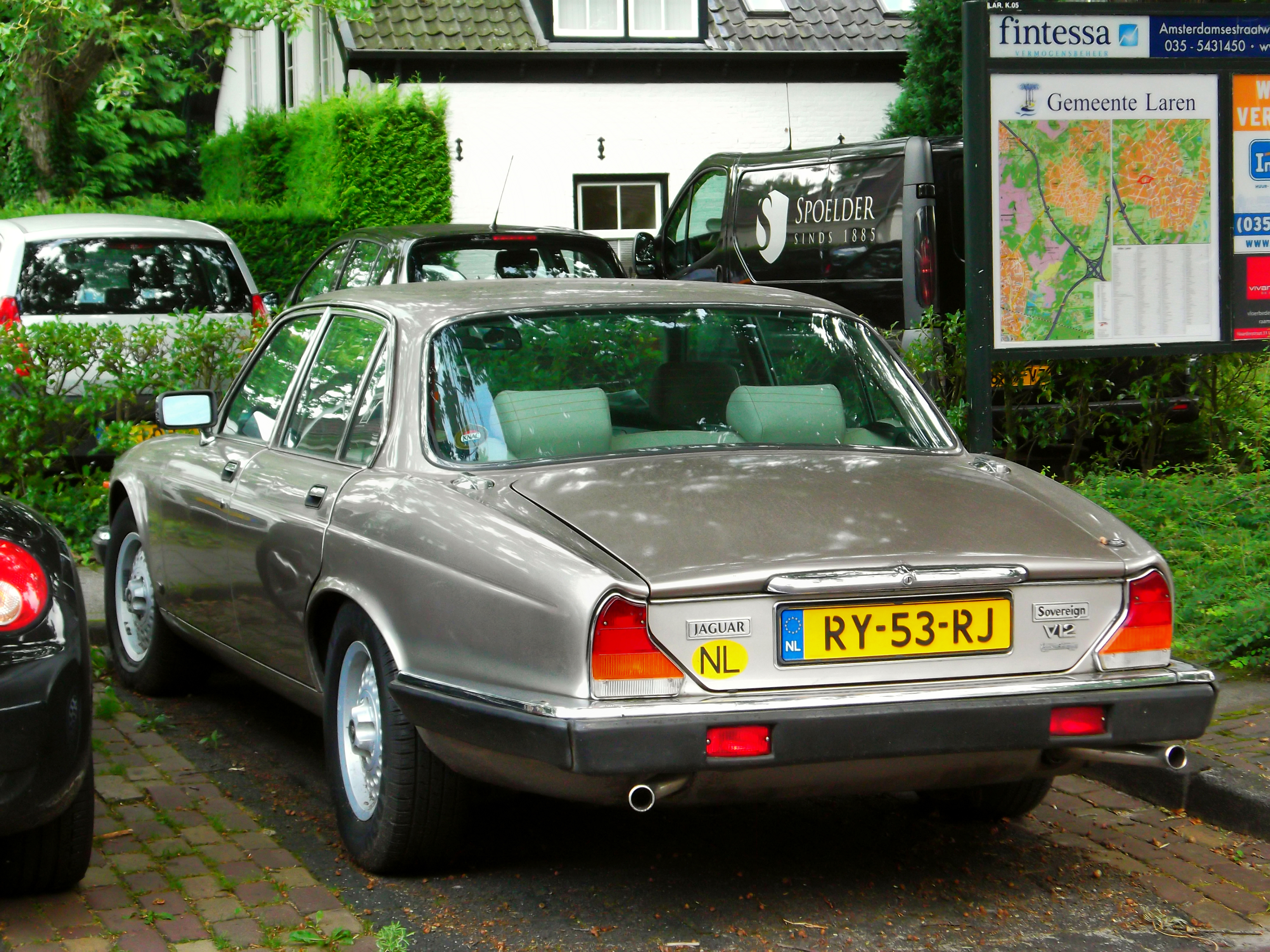
Rear view of a Series III Jaguar Sovereign V12

The car was significantly facelifted again in April 1979, known as the Series III, incorporating a subtle exterior redesign by Pininfarina. Changes from the Series II included thicker and more incorporated rubber bumpers with decorative chrome only on the top edge, flush door handles, one-piece front door glass without a separate quarter light, a grille with only vertical vanes, reverse lights moved from the boot plinth to the larger rear light clusters, and a revised roofline with narrower door frames and increased glass area. The C-pillar was also subtly modified with a more prominent "Hofmeister kink" at its base. The option of a sunroof and cruise control were also offered for the first time.

The 5.3 L V12, 4.2 L and 3.4 L straight-six engines carried over from the Series II, with minor changes. The larger six-cylinder and V12 models incorporated Bosch fuel injection (made under licence by Lucas) while the smaller six-cylinder remained carburetted. The smaller six-cylinder engine was never offered in the US, and the V12 was no longer offered there after 1980.

The 1979 UK model range included the Jaguar XJ6 3.4 and 4.2, XJ12 5.3, Daimler Sovereign 4.2 and Double-Six 5.3, and Daimler Vanden Plas 4.2 and Double-Six Vanden Plas 5.3. In 1981, the cylinder heads of the V12 engine were replaced by the new Fireball high-compression design by Swiss racing driver Michael May, and were badged from this time onwards to 1985 as "HE" (High Efficiency) models.

In late 1981, the Daimler Sovereign and Double Six models received a minor interior upgrade for the 1982 model year with features similar to Vanden Plas models. Also for the 1982 model year, a top spec Jaguar Vanden Plas model was introduced in the US market. In late 1982, the interior of all Series III models underwent a minor update for the 1983 model year. A trip computer appeared for the first time and was fitted as standard on V12 models. A new and much sought-after alloy wheel featuring numerous distinctive circular holes was also introduced, commonly known as the "pepperpot" wheel. Pirelli tyres were also fitted as standard equipment.

For the 1984 model year, the Sovereign name was transferred from the Daimler marque to a new top-specification Jaguar model, the Jaguar Sovereign. A base Jaguar XJ12 was no longer available, with the V12 engine only being offered as a Jaguar Sovereign HE or Daimler Double Six. The Vanden Plas name was also dropped at the time in the UK market, due to Jaguar being split from British Leyland and privatised; the name was used on top-of-the-range Rover-branded cars. Daimler models became the Daimler 4.2 and Double Six and were the most luxurious XJ Series III models, being fully optioned with Vanden Plas spec interiors. The Vanden Plas trademark was retained by Jaguar in North America, and top-of-the-line XJs were still sold there with the Vanden Plas name. The 1984 UK model range included the Jaguar XJ6 3.4 and 4.2, Sovereign 4.2 and 5.3, and Daimler 4.2 and Double Six 5.3.

Production of the six-cylinder Series III XJs continued until early 1987, after which it was replaced by the all-new XJ40. Due to the XJ40 being allegedly designed so that a V-angle engine would not fit in the engine bay, it needed extensive redesigning before a V12 version would be possible. As a result, to stay competitive, Jaguar continued production of the 12-cylinder Series III XJs until 1992, by which time an XJ40 based XJ12 would release the following year. The last 100 cars built were numbered and sold in Canada as part of a special series commemorating the end of production. These 100 cars featured the option of having a brass plaque located in the cabin. It was the original purchaser's option to have this plaque, which also gave a number to the car, such as No. 5 of 100, fitted to the glove box, to the console woodwork or not fitted at all. This brass plaque initiative did not come from Jaguar in Coventry: it was a local effort by Jaguar Canada staff and the brass plaques were engraved locally.

132,952 Series III cars were built, 10,500 with the V12 engine. In total between 1968 and 1992 approximately 318,000 XJ6 and XJ12 cars were produced.

=== Technical specifications ===
Technical data Jaguar XJ series 1 to 3 (European market except where stated)
Jaguar	Series 1 2.8	Series 1 4.2	Series 1 XJ12	Series 2 2.8	Series 2 3.4	Series 2 4.2 & XJ6C	Series 2 XJ12 & XJ12C	Series 3 3.4	Series 3 4.2	Series 3 XJ12
Chassis code:	1G	1L (LWB:2E)	1P (LWB: 2C)	2U	3A	2N (LWB: 2T, XJC: 2J)	2R (XJC: 2G)	A	P, R, N	W, Y, V, X
Produced:	1968–1973	1968–1973	1972–1973	1973–1974	1975–1979	1973–1979	1973–1979	1979–1984	1979–1986	1979–1992
Units sold*:	19,426	59,556	3235	170	6490	69,687	16,099	Unknown	122,453	10,500
Engine:	2792 cc XK I6	4235 cc XK I6	5343 cc V12	2792 cc XK I6	3442 cc XK I6	4235 cc XK I6	5343 cc V12	3442 cc XK I6	4235 cc XK I6	5343 cc V12
Bore x stroke:	83 mm (3.3 in) x 86 mm (3.4 in)	92.07 mm (3.6 in) x 106 mm (4.2 in)	90 mm (3.5 in) x 70 mm (2.8 in)	83 mm (3.3 in) x 86 mm (3.4 in)	83 mm (3.3 in) x 106 mm (4.2 in)	92.07 mm (3.6 in) x 106 mm (4.2 in)	90 mm (3.5 in) x 70 mm (2.8 in)	83 mm (3.3 in) x 106 mm (4.2 in)	92.07 mm (3.6 in) x 106 mm (4.2 in)	90 mm (3.5 in) x 70 mm (2.8 in)
Max. power at rpm:	140 hp (104 kW) at 5,500	186 hp (139 kW) at 4,500	250 hp (186 kW) at 6,000	140 hp (104 kW) at 5,500	161 hp (120 kW) at 5,000	172 hp (128 kW) at 4,500	258 hp (192 kW) at 6,000, later 285 hp (213 kW) at 5,750	163 hp (122 kW) at 5,000	205 hp (153 kW) at 5,000	285 hp (213 kW) at 5,750, later 295 hp (220 kW) at 5,500
Max. torque at rpm:	192 N⋅m (142 lb⋅ft) at 4,250	313 N⋅m (231 lb⋅ft) at 3,000	408 N⋅m (301 lb⋅ft) at 3,500	192 N⋅m (142 lb⋅ft) at 4,250	256 N⋅m (189 lb⋅ft) at 3,500	313 N⋅m (231 lb⋅ft) at 3,000	408 N⋅m (301 lb⋅ft) at 3,500, later 399 N⋅m (294 lb⋅ft) at 3,500	256 N⋅m (189 lb⋅ft) at 3,500	313 N⋅m (231 lb⋅ft) at 3,000	399 N⋅m (294 lb⋅ft) at 3,500, later 432 N⋅m (319 lb⋅ft) at 3,250
Compression ratio:	8.5: 1	7.8: 1	9.0: 1	8.5: 1	8.5: 1	7.8: 1	9.0: 1	8.5: 1	8.1: 1	9.0: 1 later 12.5: 1
Fueling:	2x SU HD8, later 2x SU HS8 (US 4.2: 2x Stromberg 175 CD)		4x Stromberg 175 CD	2x SU HS8	2x SU HIF7 (US 4.2: 2x Stromberg 175 CD)		4x Stromberg 175 CD, later Lucas EFI	2x SU HIF7	Lucas-Bosch; L-Jetronic	Lucas EFI
Valvetrain:	DOHC 12v, duplex chain		2x SOHC 24v, duplex chain	DOHC 12v, duplex chain			2x SOHC 24v, duplex chain	DOHC 12v, duplex chain		2x SOHC 24v, duplex chain
Fuel tank capacity:	2x 47.7 L (12.6 US gal; 10.5 imp gal)									
Cooling:	Water cooling with engine driven fan									
Transmission:	RWD 4 speed manual with optional overdrive or Borg-Warner 3 speed automatic		RWD Borg-Warner 3 speed automatic	RWD 4 speed manual with optional overdrive or Borg-Warner 3 speed automatic			RWD Borg-Warner/GM 3 speed automatic	RWD 5 speed manual or Borg-Warner 3 speed automatic		RWD GM 3 speed automatic
Electrical system:	12 Volt negative earth									
Front suspension:	Double wishbones, coil springs, stabilising bar, anti-dive geometry									
Rear suspension::	Independent, optional LSD		Independent, LSD	Independent, optional LSD			Independent, LSD	Independent, optional LSD		Independent, LSD
Brakes:	Disc brakes (solid front and rear), power assisted		Disc brakes (vented front, solid rear), power assisted							
Steering:	Rack and pinion, optional power assistance	Rack and pinion, power assisted								
Body structure:	Sheet steel, monocoque (unibody) construction									
Dry weight:	1,630 kg (3,594 lb)	1,775 kg (3,913 lb)	1,760 kg (3,880 lb)	1,630 kg (3,594 lb)	1,685 kg (3,715 lb)	1,775 kg (3,913 lb)	1,810 kg (3,990 lb)	1,766 kg (3,893 lb)	1,830 kg (4,034 lb)	1,930 kg (4,255 lb)
Track:	1,473 mm (58.0 in)							1,480 mm (58 in) front 1,495 mm (58.9 in) rear		
Wheelbase:	2,763 mm (108.8 in); LWB: 2,865 mm (112.8 in)				2,865 mm (112.8 in)	SWB & XJC 2,763 mm (108.8 in); LWB: 2,865 mm (112.8 in)		2,865 mm (112.8 in)		
Length:	4,843 mm (190.7 in); LWB: 4,945 mm (194.7 in)				4,945 mm (194.7 in)	SWB & XJC 4,843 mm (190.7 in); LWB: 4,945 mm (194.7 in)		4,959 mm (195.2 in); USA & Canada: 5,067 mm (199.5 in)		
Width:	1,770 mm (70 in)									
Height:	1,375 mm (54.1 in)							1,377 mm (54.2 in)		
Top speed: (automatic)	177 km/h (110 mph)	192 km/h (119 mph)	237 km/h (147 mph)	177 km/h (110 mph)	185 km/h (115 mph)	192 km/h (119 mph)	225 km/h (140 mph)	185 km/h (115 mph)	200 km/h (124 mph)	230 km/h (143 mph)
Acceleration: (0–100 km/h automatic)	15.2 seconds	12.5 seconds	7.4 seconds	15.2 seconds	12.9 seconds	12.5 seconds	7.9 seconds	12.5 seconds	10.5 seconds	8.4 seconds
Notes:	* Daimler versions excluded									

== XJ40, X300, and X308 (1986–2003) ==
The second generation of the XJ was produced for a total of 17 years with the arrival of the XJ40 in 1986 with its X300 and X308 derivatives being introduced later.

=== XJ40 (1986–1994) ===
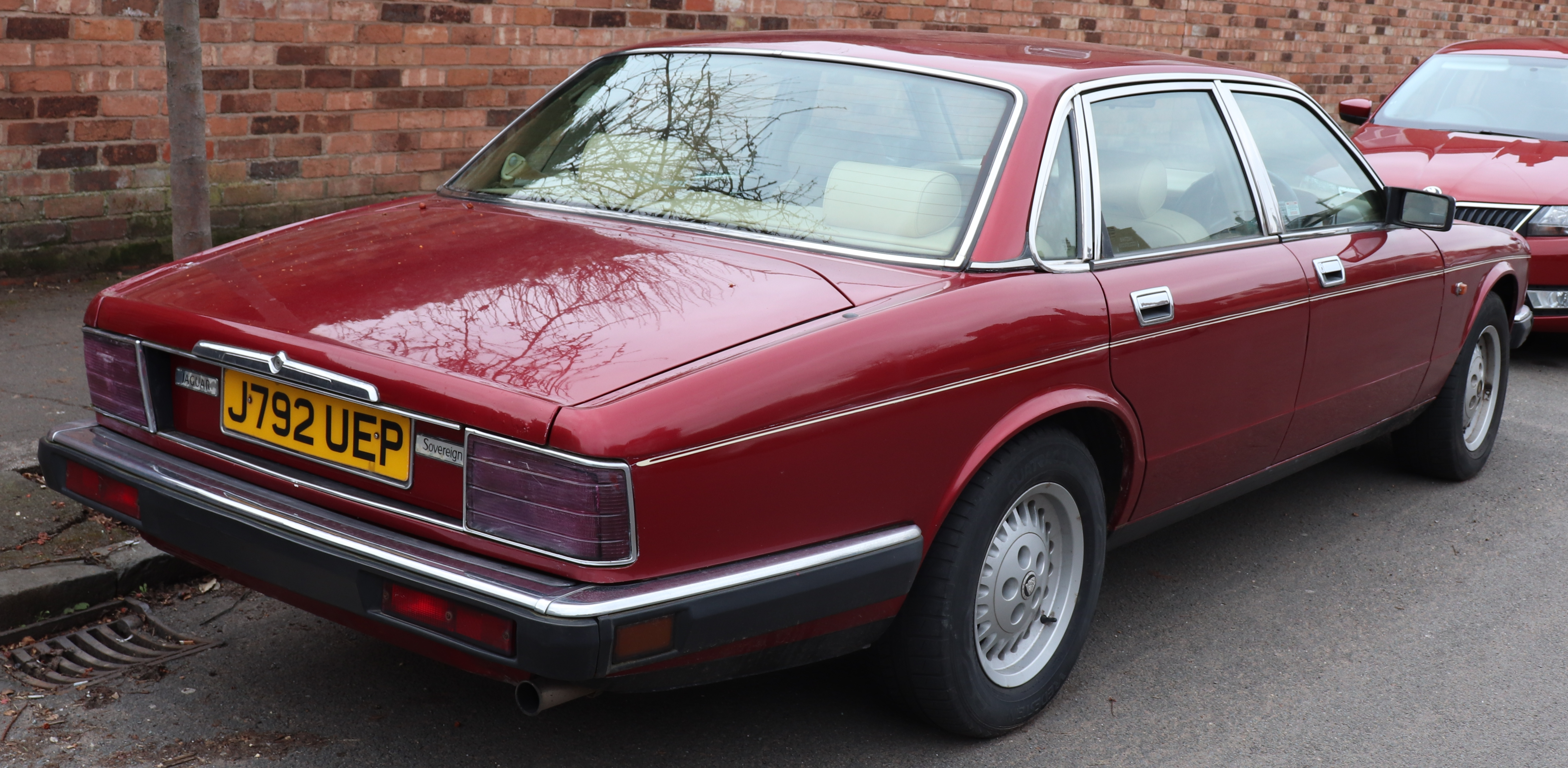
Rear view of a 1992 Jaguar Sovereign

The intended replacement for the Series XJ models was code-named XJ40, and development on the all-new car began in the early 1970s (with small scale models being built as early as 1972). The project suffered a number of delays due to problems at parent company British Leyland and events such as the 1973 oil crisis. The XJ40 was finally unveiled on 8 October 1986 at the British International Motor Show.

With the XJ40, Jaguar began to place more emphasis on build quality as well as simplification of the XJ's build process. With 25% fewer body panel pressings required versus the outgoing model, the new process also saved weight, increased the stiffness of the chassis, and reduced cabin noise.

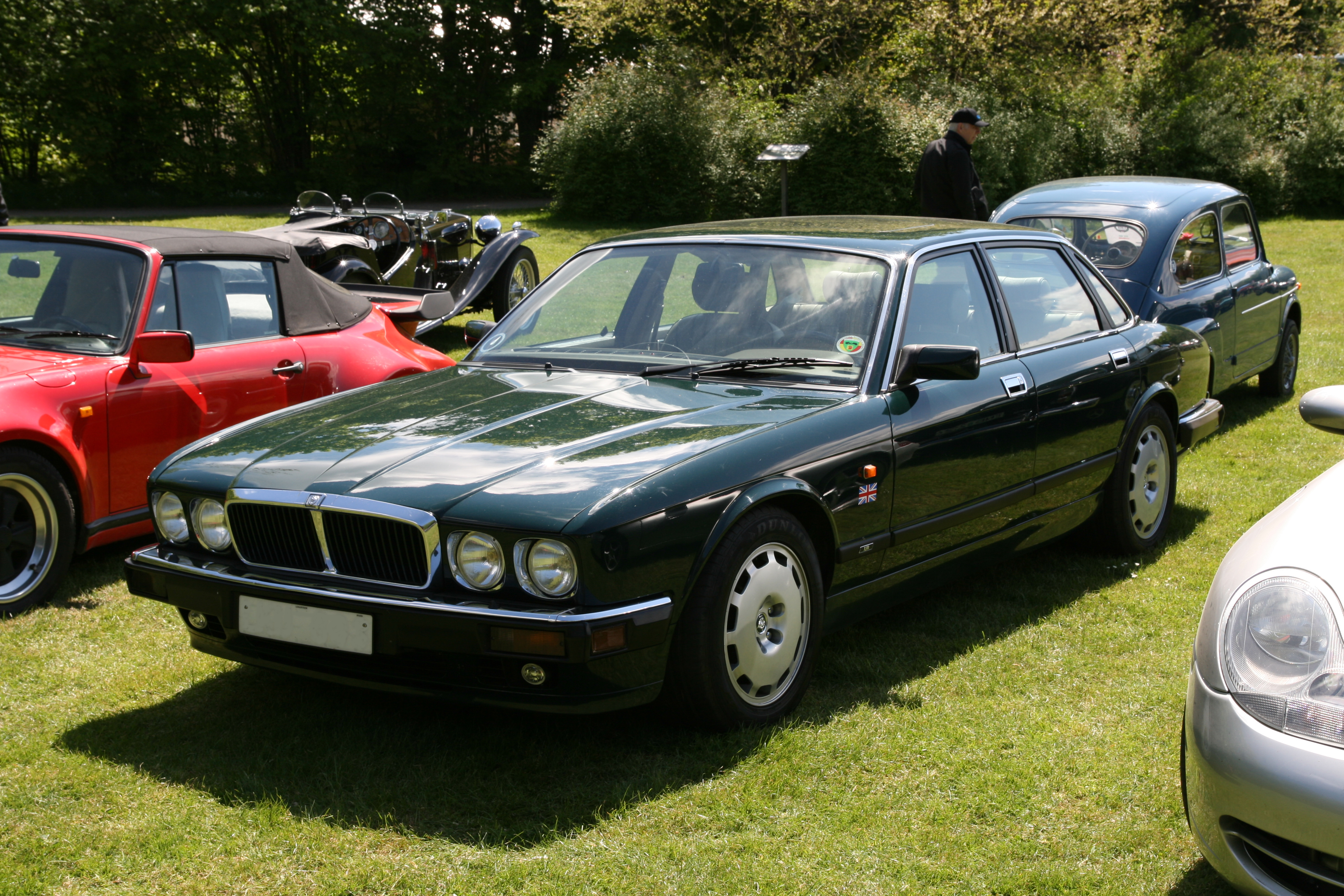
1993 Jaguar XJR

The new platform came with significantly different styling, which was more squared-off and angular than the outgoing Series III. Individual round headlamps were replaced with rectangular units on the higher-specification cars, either 390mm millimetric tyres or 15" wheels with 225/65R15 Pirelli Cinturato P5 tyres and all models came with only a single, wide-sweeping windshield wiper. The interior received several modernisations such as the switch to a digital instrument cluster, although this was eventually discontinued for the 1990 model year in favour of analogue instruments.

The six-cylinder XJ40s are powered by the AJ6 inline-six engine, which replaced the XK unit used in earlier XJs. The new unit featured a four-valve, twin overhead cam design. In 1993, one year before XJ40 production ended, the V12-powered XJ12 and Daimler Double Six models were reintroduced.

=== X300 (1994–1997) ===
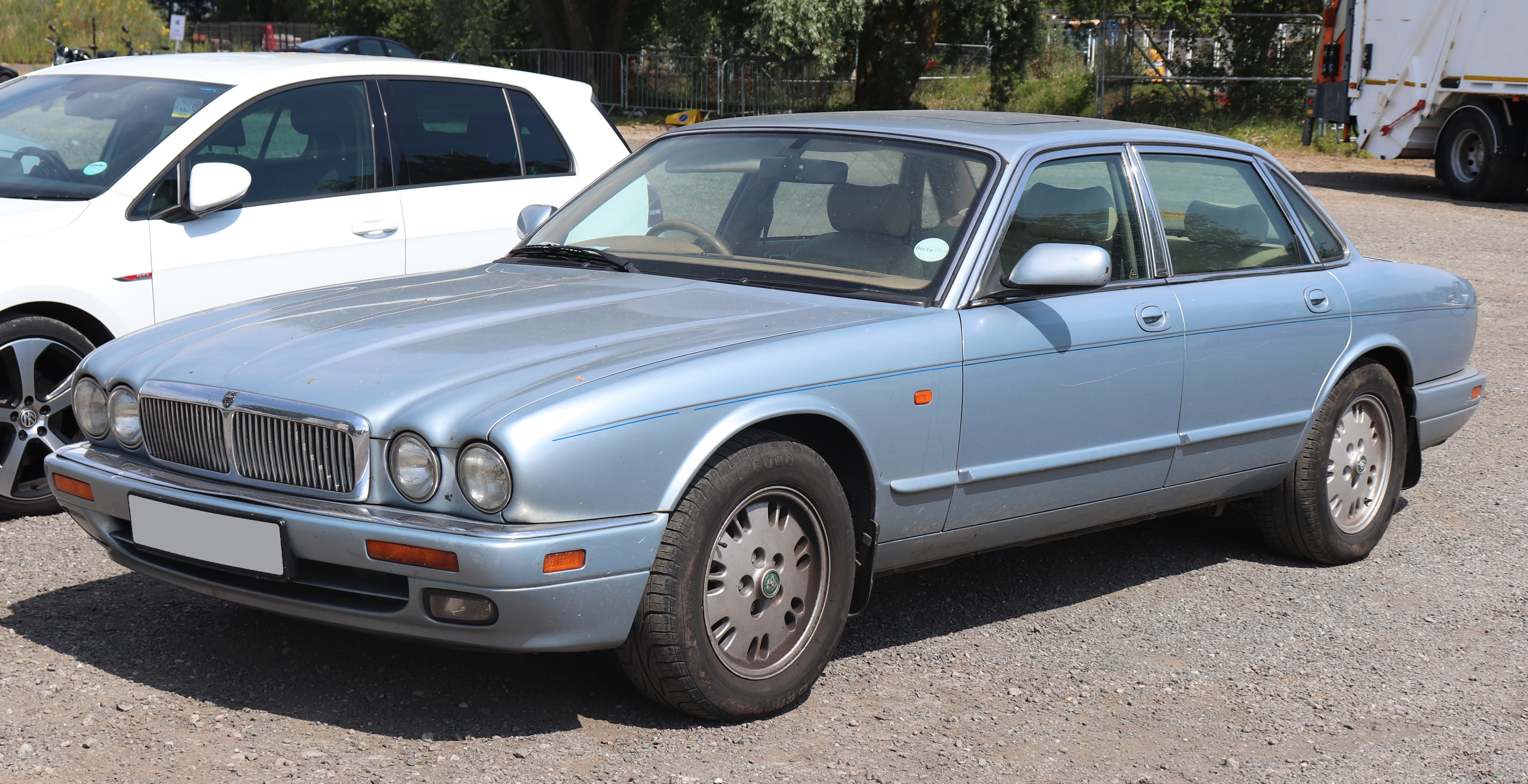
A Jaguar Sovereign (X300)

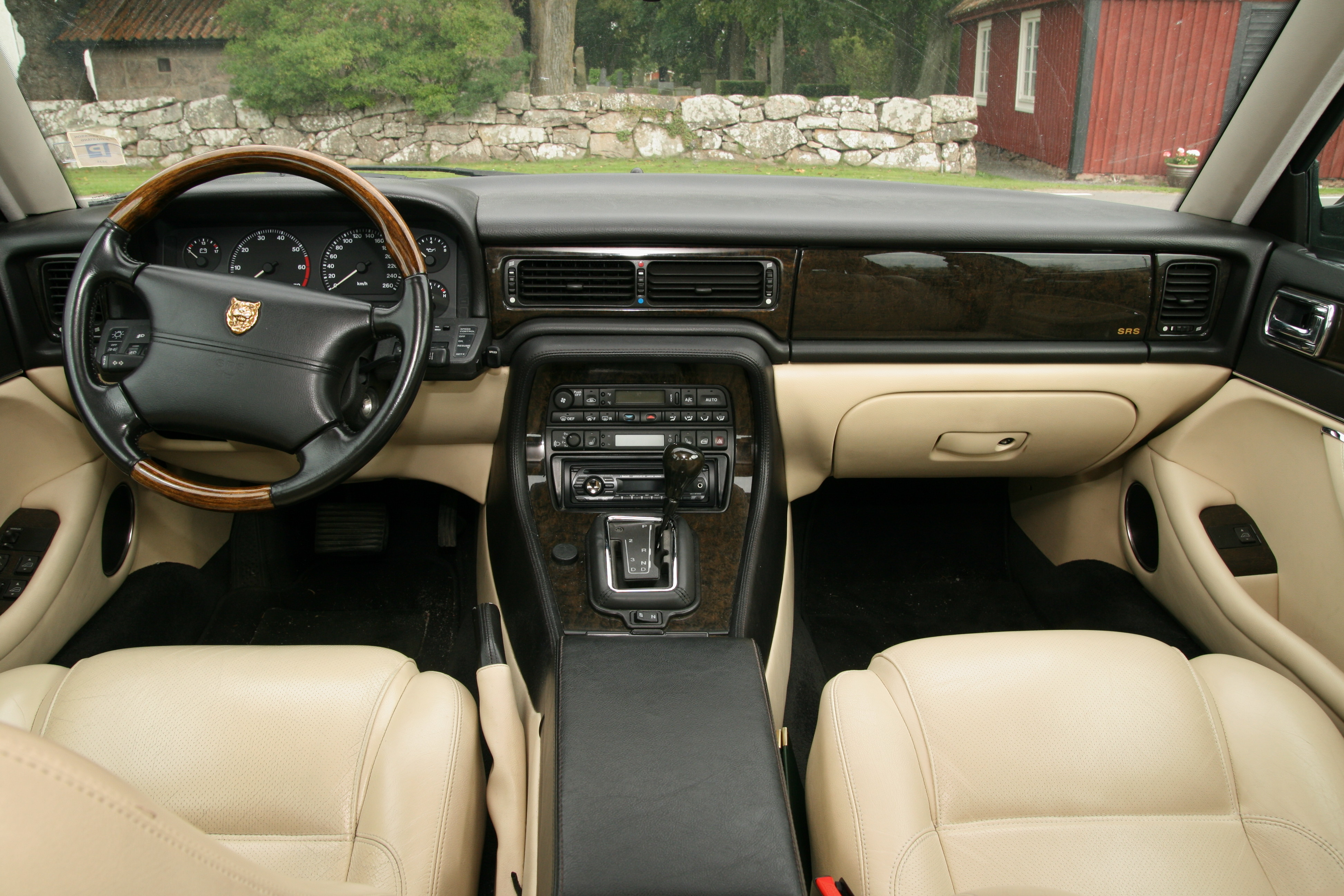
Interior of the X300

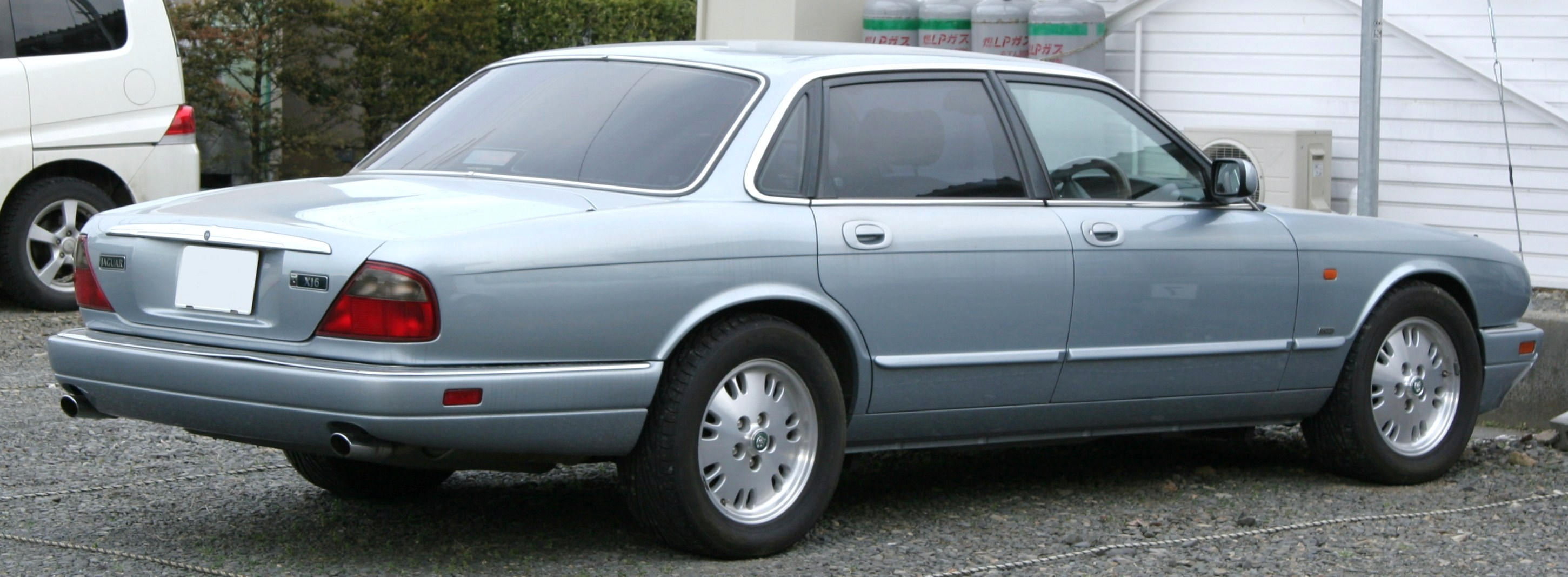
Rear view of a Jaguar XJ6

The X300, introduced in October 1994 at the Paris Motor Show, was stylistically intended to evoke the image of the more curvaceous Series XJ models. The front of the car was redesigned significantly to return to four individual round headlamps that provided definition to the sculptured bonnet. Mechanically, it was similar to the XJ40 that it replaced.

Six-cylinder X300 models are powered by the AJ16 inline-six engine, which is a further enhancement of the AJ6 engine that uses an electronic distributorless ignition system. The V12 remained available until the end of the X300 production in 1997, although it ended one year earlier in the United States market due to problems meeting OBD-II-related emissions requirements. Jaguar first introduced the supercharged XJR model in the X300's production run; the first supercharged road car manufactured by the company.

Design of the X300 was directly affected by Ford's ownership of Jaguar (between 1990 and 2007). According to Automotive News, this was evident in general "product development processes", more than the use of Ford components. The X300's traction control system was obtained from the Ford Mondeo and it also featured a Denso air conditioner purchased through Ford channels. In a Car and Driver's comparison test, it was stated that the X300 Jaguar XJ is less roomy than the E39 BMW 5 Series and W210 Mercedes-Benz E-Class despite being longer dimensionally.

=== X308 (1997–2003) ===
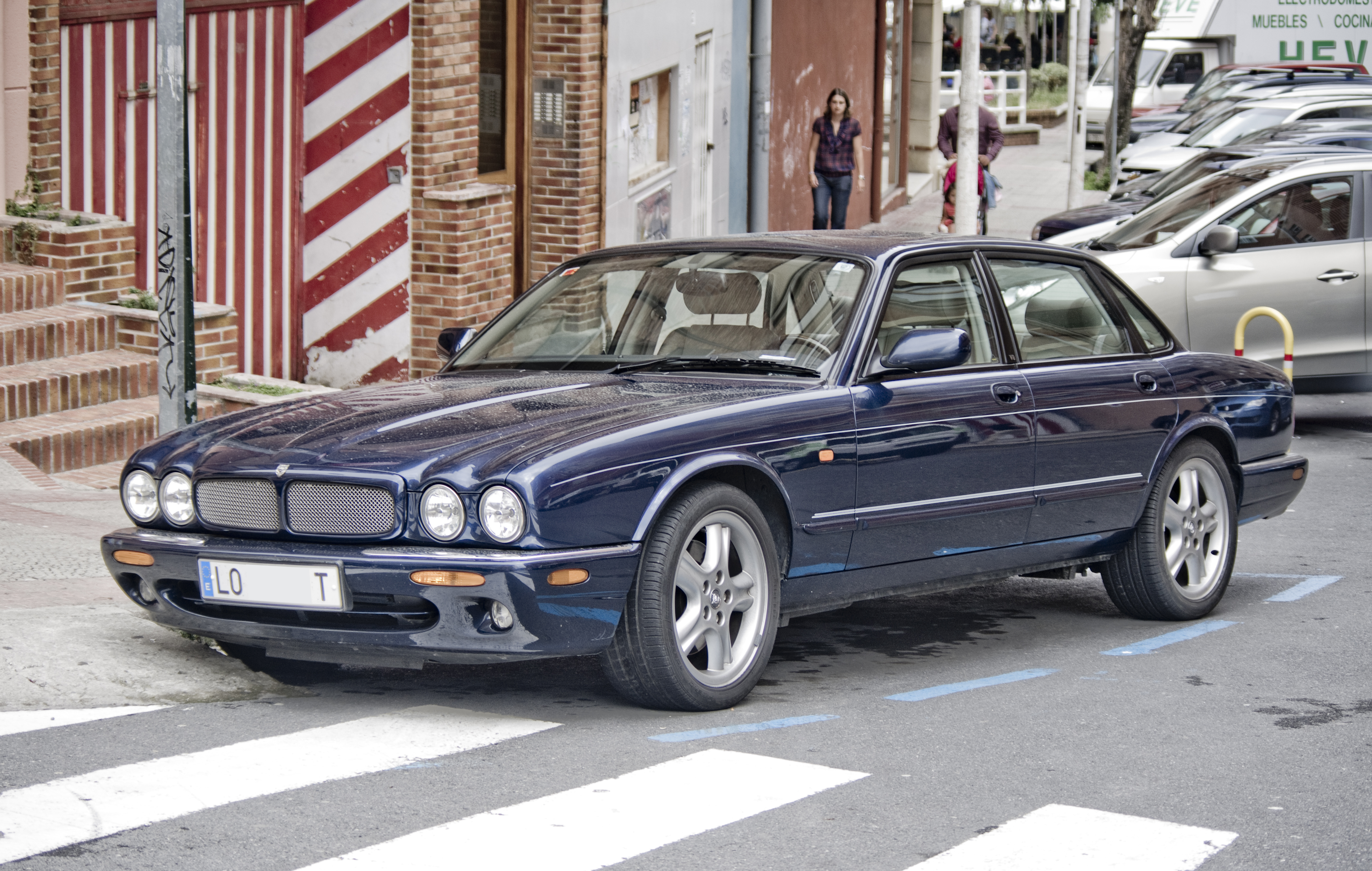
A Jaguar XJR (X308)

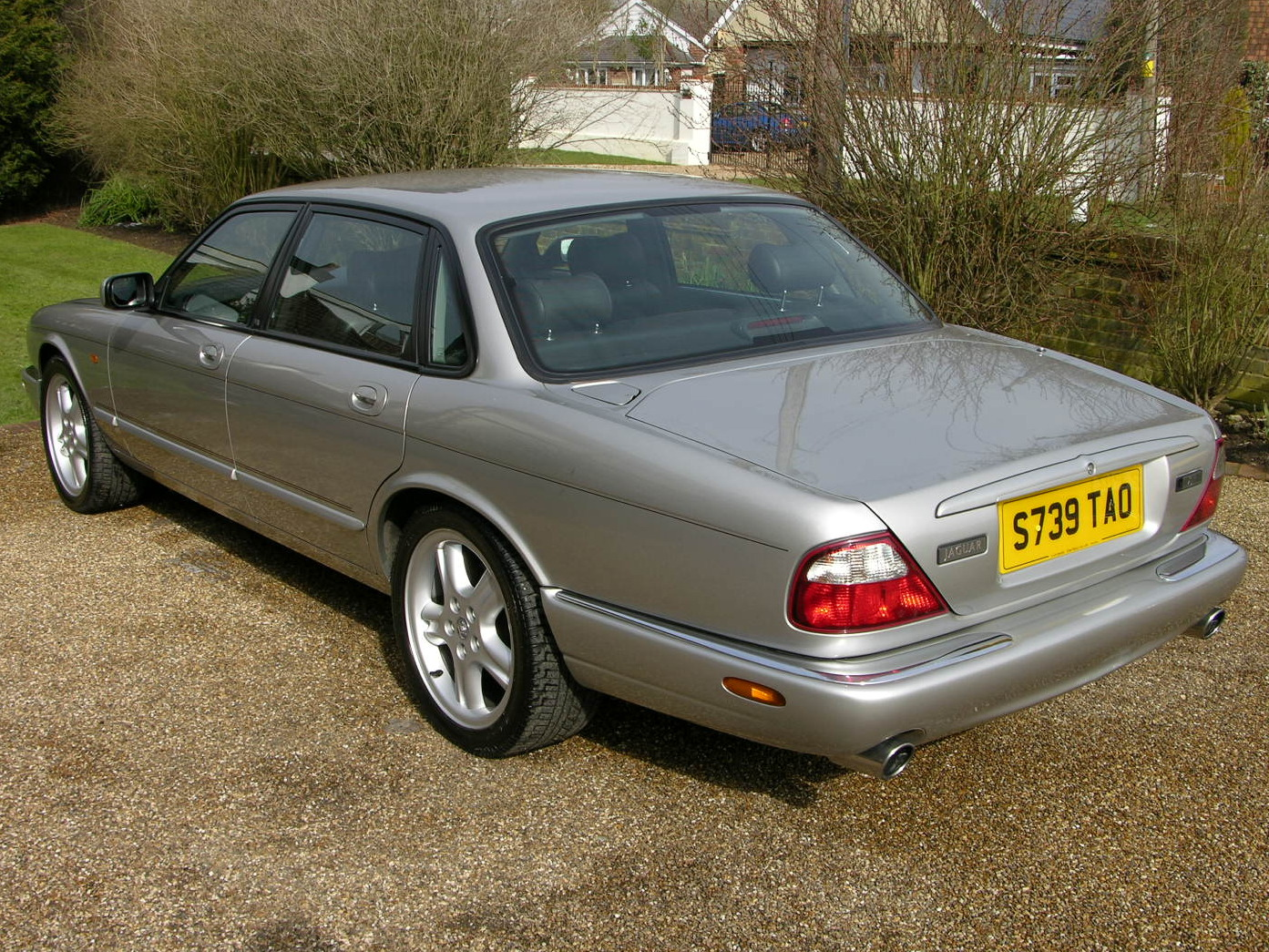
Rear view of a Jaguar XJR

After the XJ40, Jaguar's intention was to launch a brand new saloon with a new V8 engine. Ford halted development of the saloon, termed XJ90, and proposed to install its new engine and front and rear ends onto the centre section of the XJ40 model; however, the V8 was not ready until after the X308 model, and the X300 went on to become one of Jaguar's most successful models. With the introduction of the X308 generation in 1997 came a switch from the XJ6 and XJ12 nomenclature to XJ8, reflecting the fact that the X308 cars were powered by a new V8 engine. The exterior styling of the X308 is similar to the X300 with minor refinements. The biggest change in the appearance was the switch to a stylistically rounded design for all of the exterior lights, indicators and interior trim and fittings, including information displays and switches.

The X308 kept much of the same exterior styling as its predecessor, carrying its rounded four-headlamp bonnet, low roofline, sloping tail, and wrap-around rear light clusters. From the front, the two generations can be differentiated by the shape of the indicator lenses (rectangular on the X300, oval on the X308), and also by the shape of the fog lamps and lower valance air intake, both of which are more rounded on the X308. The interior was updated to eliminate the rectangular instrument binnacle that had gone largely unchanged since the original XJ40; instead, three large gauges were set into recesses in the walnut-faced dashboard in front of the driver similar in design to the recently launched Jaguar XK (X100). The front and rear bumpers were both changed along with the taillights which had red/clear lenses rather than red/grey lenses. The grille surround and badging was slightly changed. The headlight fixtures also included forward parking lights housed with the brights, new to X308.

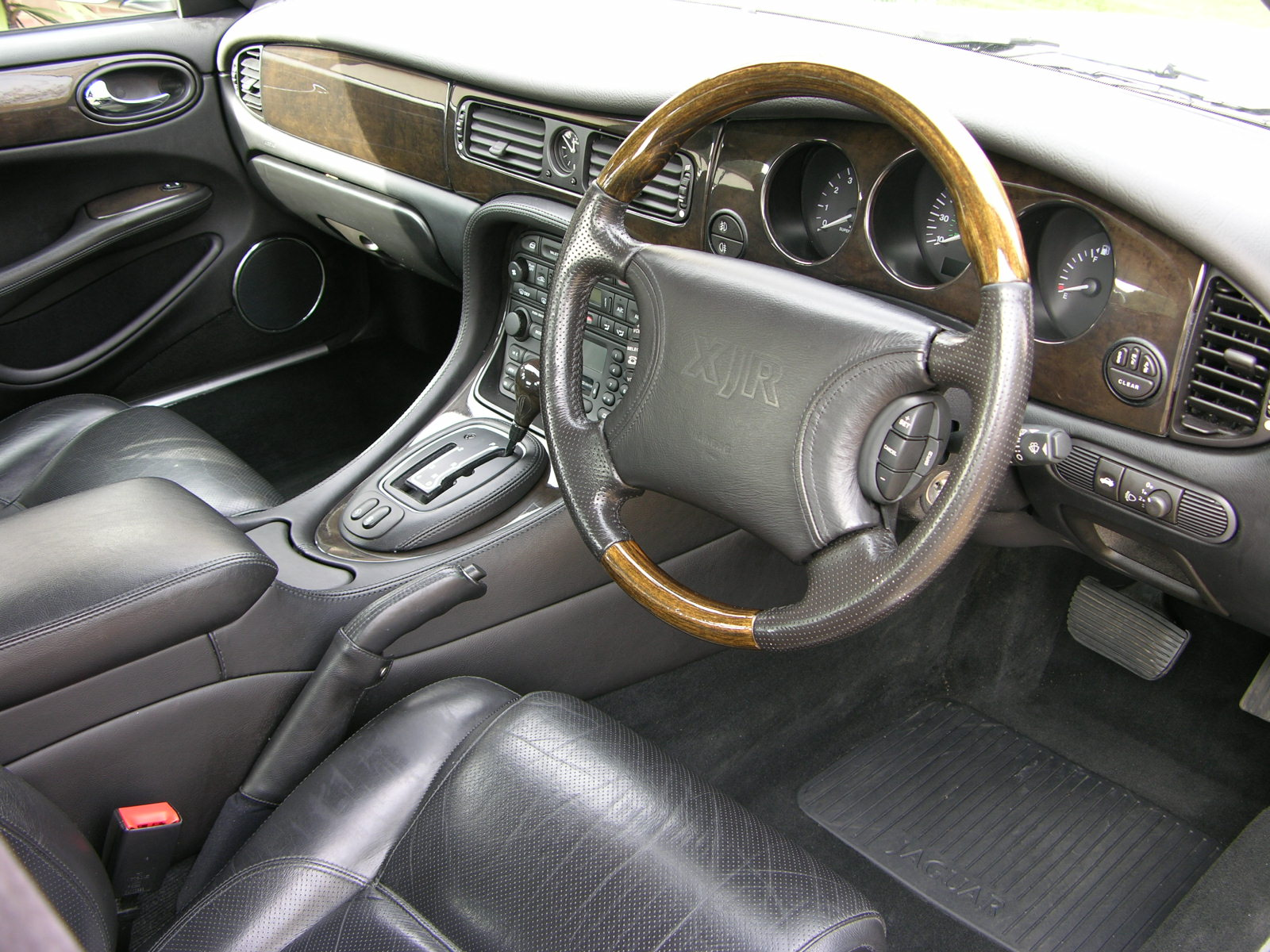
Interior of a Jaguar XJR

The biggest change to the interior on the X308 was to the dashboard, which had remained essentially the same since the original XJ40 with only detail changes over the years. The rectangular instrument binnacle gave way to three deeply recessed dials similar in style to the recently introduced Jaguar XK8. The new fascia also allowed for the restoration of a proper glove compartment, which had been lost when the original XJ40 dash had been retrofitted with a passenger side airbag. Door trim and the design of the center console were also slightly revised.

The major mechanical change was the replacement of both the inline-six and V12 engines with new eight-cylinder AJ-V8 in either a displacement of 3.2 L or 4.0 L, with the 4.0 L also available in supercharged form in the Jaguar XJR, a sport-oriented model. Certain markets, such as the United States, only received cars powered by the 4.0 L version. No manual transmission was available, and all X308 models were supplied with a five-speed automatic gearbox. Computer-controlled active suspension was available as a feature named Computer Active Technology Suspension (CATS).

== X350, X356, and X358 (2003–2009) ==
=== XJ (X350) (2003–2005) ===
XJ (X350 and X358)
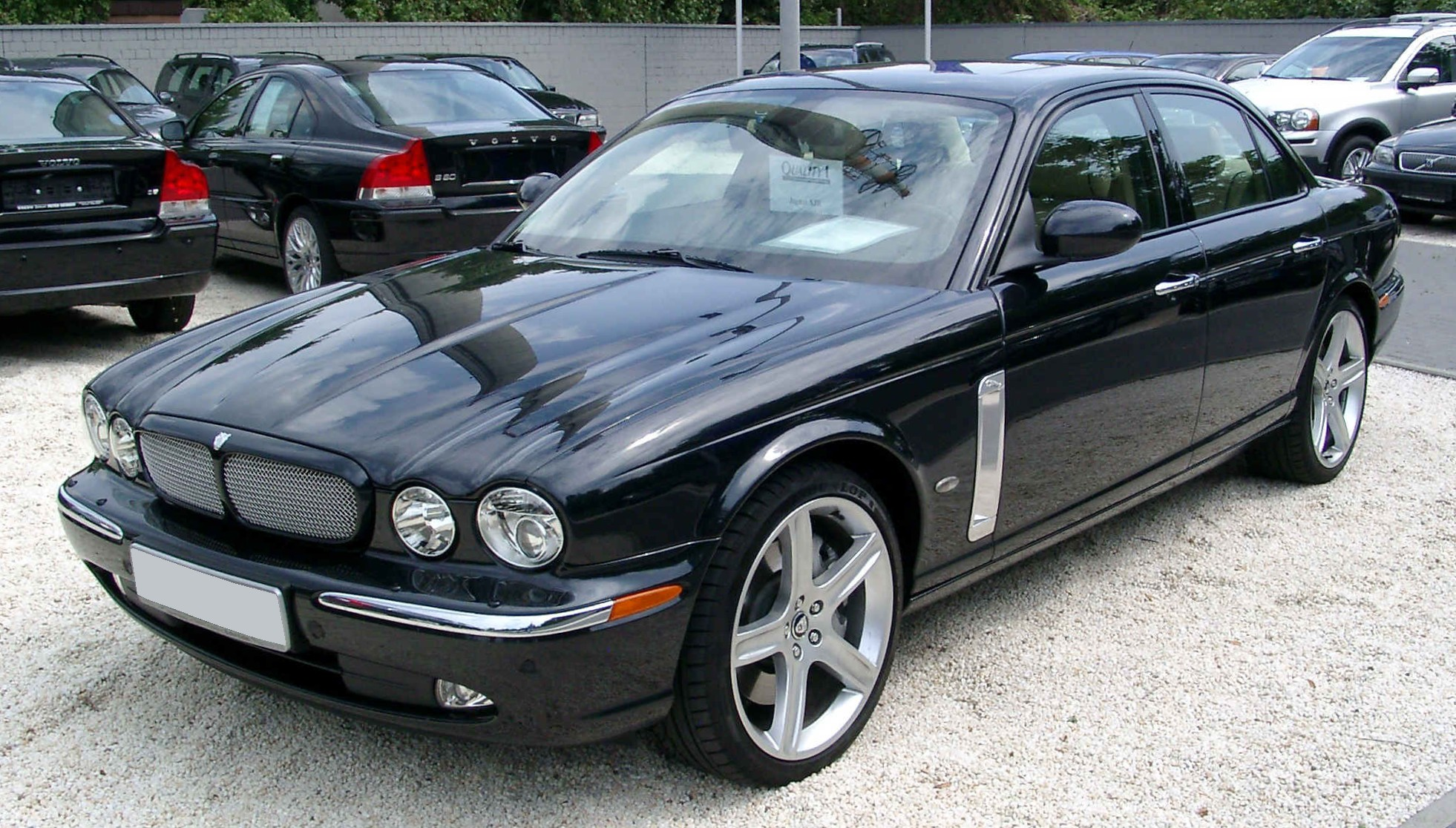
- Jaguar XJR

Overview
- Also called: XJ8, Vanden Plas, XJR, Super V8; Daimler Super Eight
- Production: 2002–2009
- Assembly: United Kingdom: Birmingham, England (Castle Bromwich Assembly)

Body and chassis
- Body style: 4-door saloon

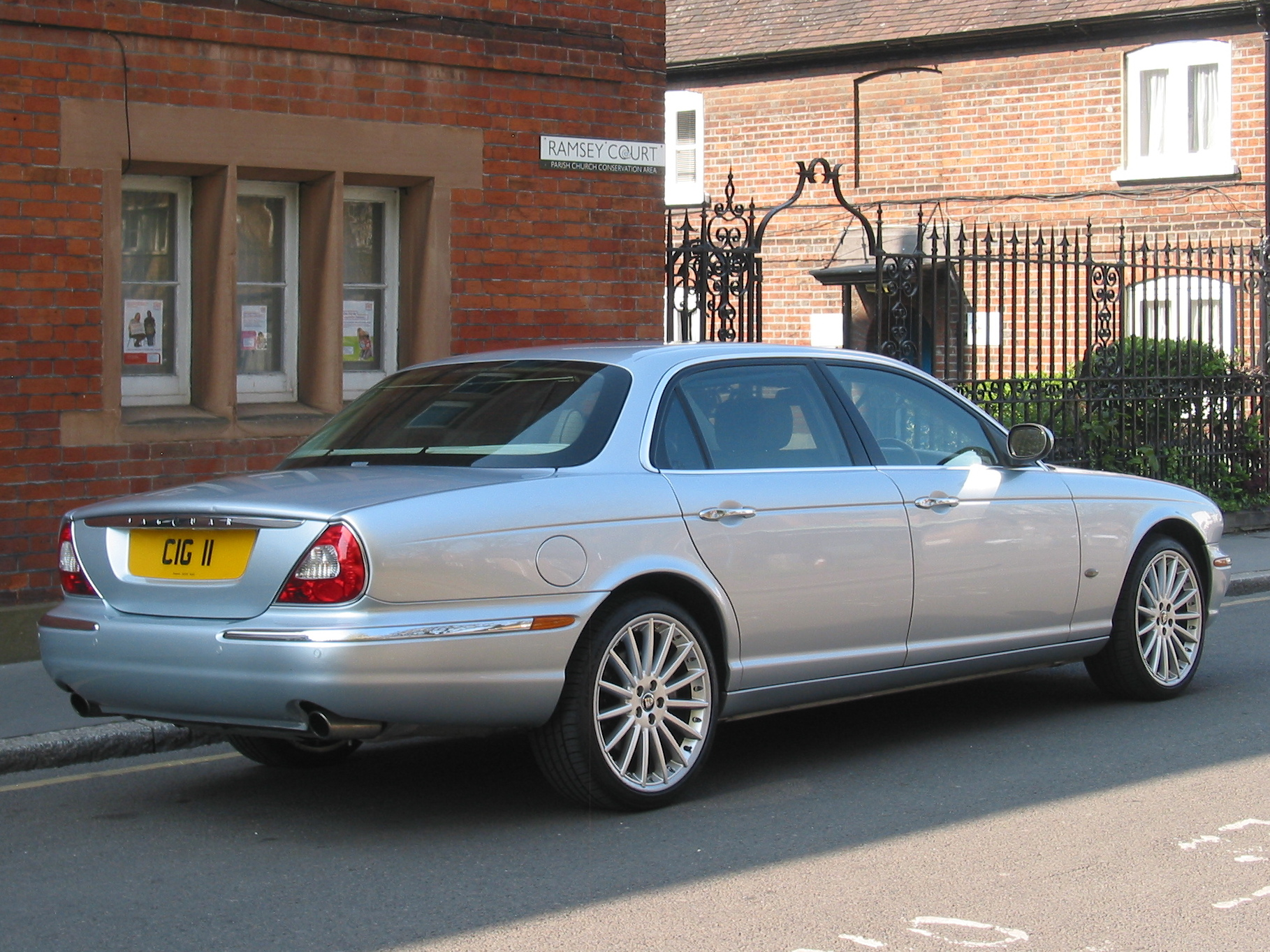
Rear view of the X356 model

In 2003, Jaguar introduced the re-engineered and newly designed third generation of the XJ, continuing with the XJ8 model designation. Designated internally as the X350, it featured an all-aluminium body and chassis, a new V8 engine, as well as greater interior and luggage spaces. It was the first Jaguar XJ to be completely designed under Ford ownership and used electronics and computer-controlled systems sourced through existing partner suppliers or directly produced by Ford. 83,518 were manufactured over its seven-year production run.

The V8 engine was offered in larger 3.5 and 4.2-litre displacements as well in a supercharged variation. A 3.0-litre V6 engine was also offered; neither the V6 petrol nor diesel engines were available in US markets. A new six-speed automatic gearbox was fitted which was lighter and offered better economy with lock-up on all gears and a larger spread of ratios.

Air suspension was fitted at the front and rear, providing adaptive damping as well as rear self leveling— with computer-controlled ride height and suspension mode. Dynamic stability control as well as traction control were standard. Radar based adaptive cruise control was offered. Two-zone climate control was also standard, with four-zone available on long-wheelbase models. An optional touch screen interface controlled default settings, satellite navigation, the Alpine audio system, and Bluetooth telephone. Jaguar Voice offered voice control of many functions.

=== XJ (X356) (2005–2007) ===
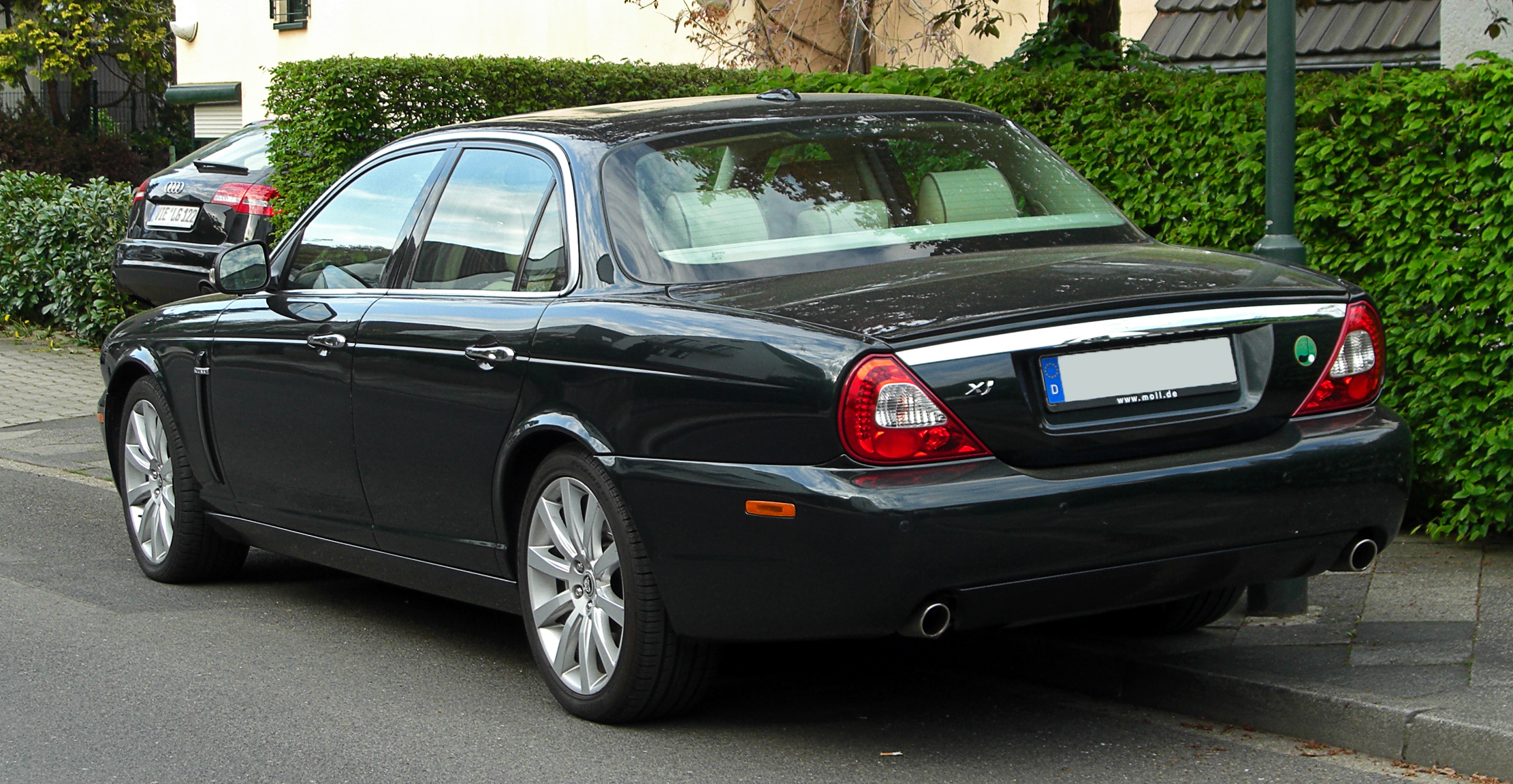
Rear view of a facelifted X350

The facelifted X350 debuted in 2005 for the model year 2006, with a revised front grille and with slightly redesigned front fenders. Some vehicle electronics systems were updated.

=== XJ (X358) (2007–2009) ===
Jaguar launched the X358 facelift to the X350 at the end of February 2007 with a revised lower grille, prominent faux side air vents, small bootlid spoiler, and revised seating. A Jaguar emblem within the grille replaced the previous bonnet-mounted bonnet mascot. The front lights were revised and door mirrors incorporated side repeaters. The side sills, rear bumper, and taillights were revised. The interior featured redesigned front seats.

== X351 (2010–2019) ==
XJ (X351)
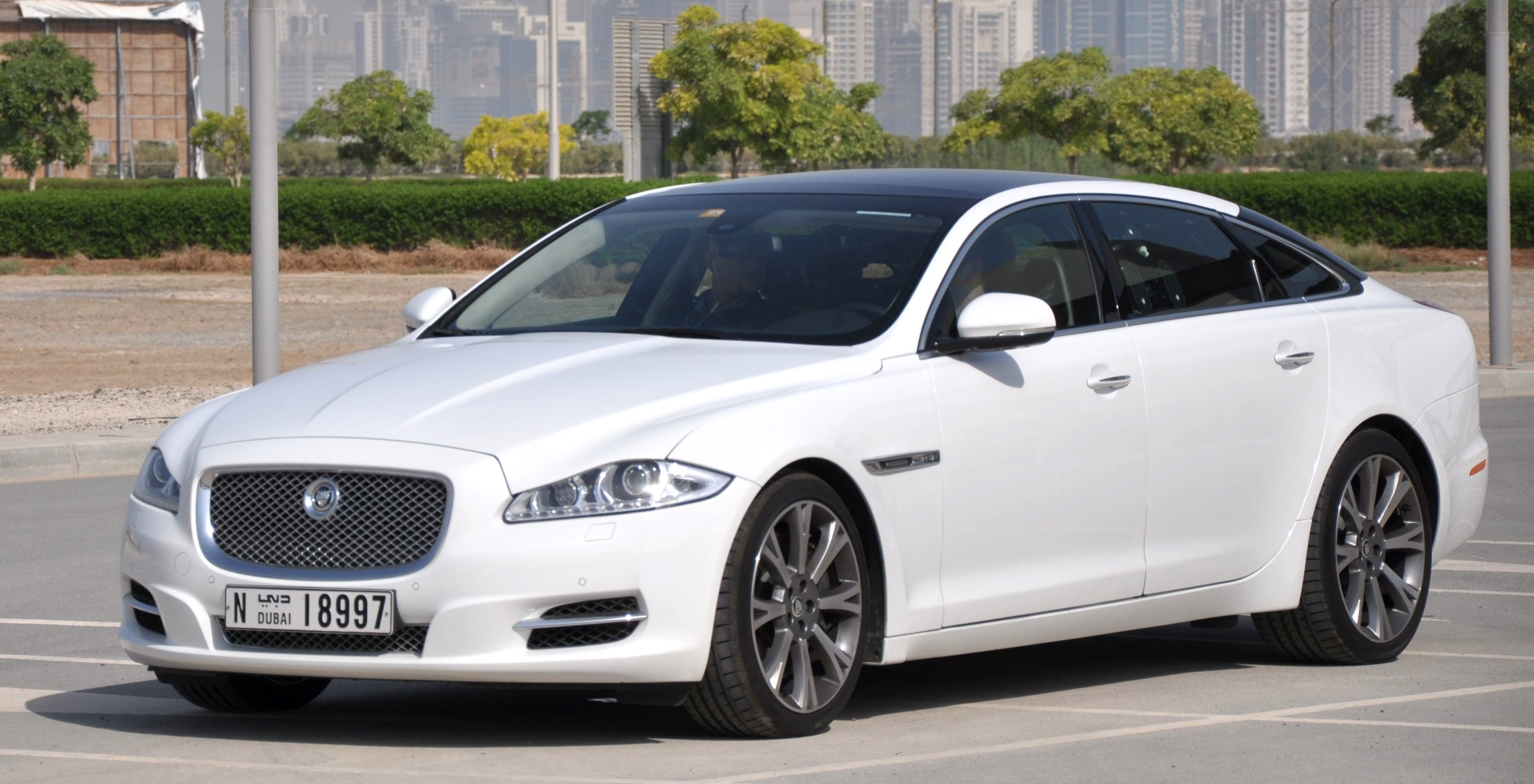

Overview
- Production: 2009–2019
- Assembly: United Kingdom: Birmingham, England (Castle Bromwich Assembly); India: Pune
- Designer: Ian Callum; Giles Taylor

Body and chassis
- Body style: 4-door saloon

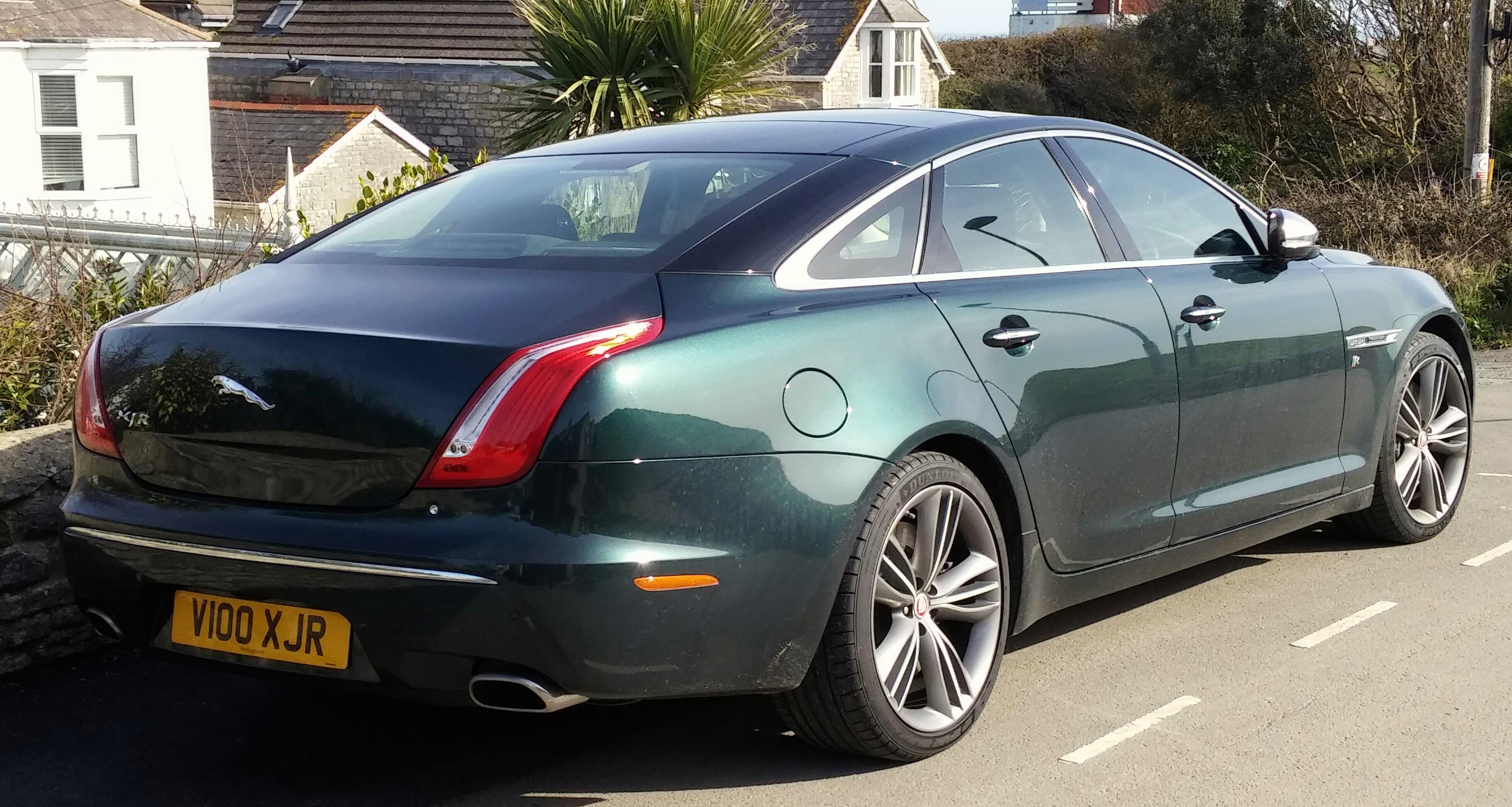
Rear view of a Jaguar XJR Super Sport

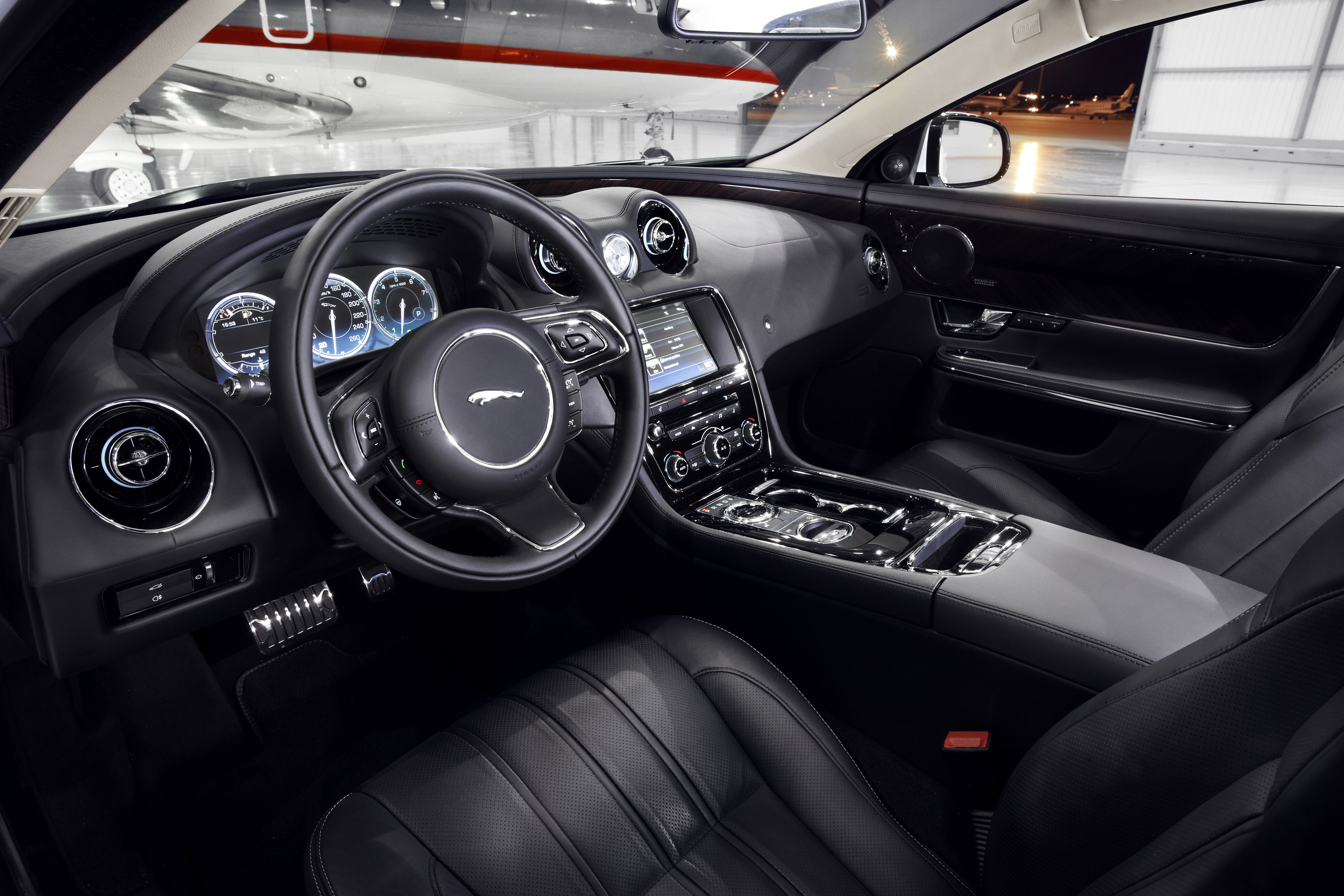
Interior of the Jaguar XJ Ultimate

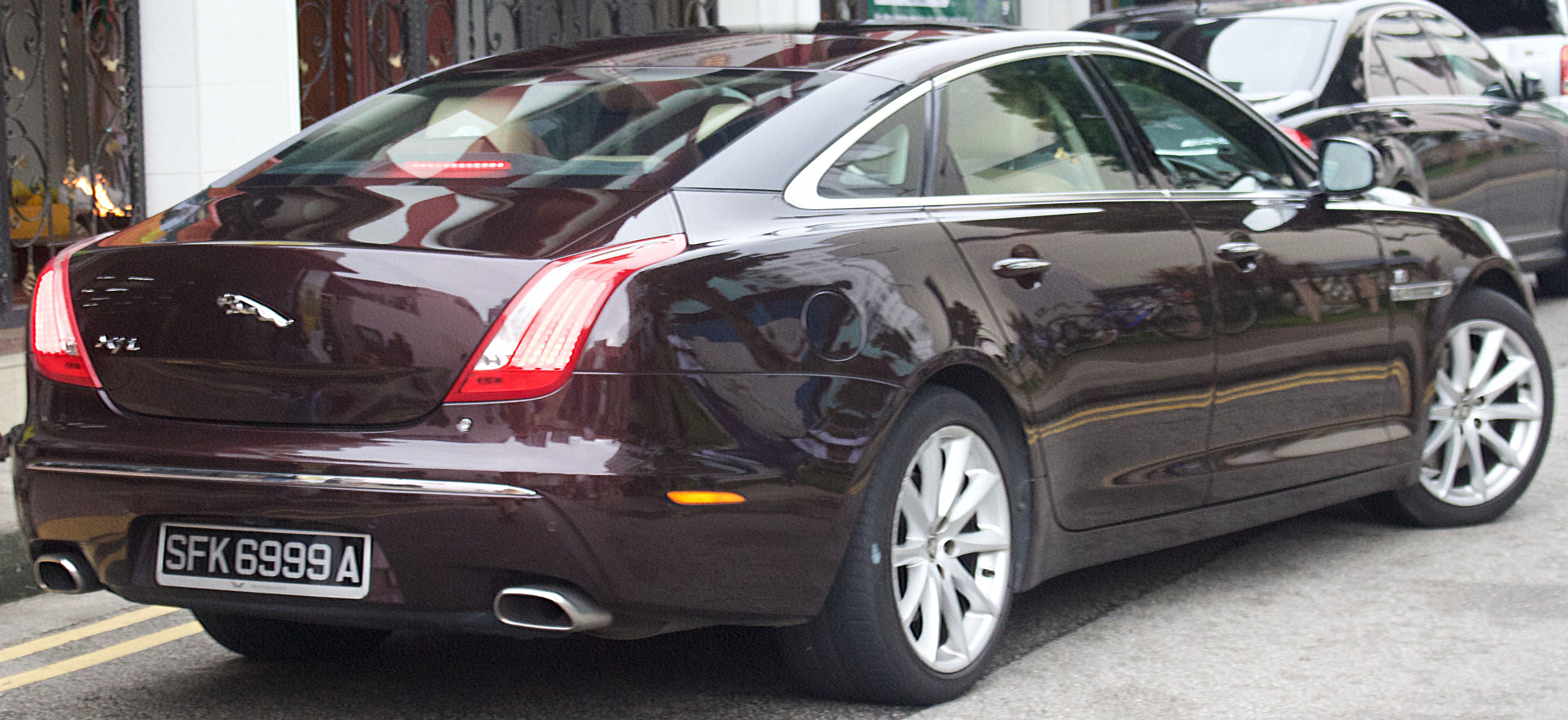
Rear view of a Jaguar XJ L

In July 2009, the redesigned XJ was unveiled at the Saatchi Gallery in London, with Jay Leno and Elle Macpherson unveiling the new car. The unveiling was broadcast live on the Jaguar website.

In keeping with Ian Callum's new design direction for Jaguar, the XJ has an all-new exterior design and a break from the XJ Series mould carried over on all previous generations. It is a longer, wider car that is much bigger than its predecessor. The front has clear links with the XF executive car, although with slimmer, sleeker lights and a larger, squarer grille add a more aggressive appearance. The rear is the contentious part, an unusual design element for a Jaguar automobile. The upright, swooping taillights, nicknamed "cat's claws", and black roof panels at each side of the rear screen, which aim to hide the XJ's width, are the most striking aspects. There is also a standard full-length sunroof, that extends all the way back with just a single body-coloured roof panel that the designer refers as bridges on yachts. The new XJ features an innovative, all-LCD dashboard and console displays. The dashboard can be configured to display various virtual dials in addition to the obligatory speedometer. The console display presents different views to the driver and passenger, including control of a sophisticated video and audio system.

Like several of its predecessors, the X351 is available in both standard and long-wheelbase form, as well as many special editions. Engines are modern units already seen in other JLR products: the 5.0-litre petrol V8 either normally aspirated or supercharged, or a 3.0-litre diesel twin-turbocharged V6 that is predicted to account for most of the sales. For 2013, a 3.0-litre supercharged V6 was introduced to the line-up, primarily as an alternative to the diesel unit for improved fuel economy. The X351 received a minor facelift in 2014, primarily upgrading the suspension and rear seat facilities on the long wheelbase versions, but also introducing small cosmetic changes across the range, and making stop-start technology standard on all engines.

The X351 received another facelift in 2015, adding LED headlights, J-Blade rear taillights, and adding several new driver assistance and safety features such as lane assist, adaptive cruise control with a new feature known as "Queue assist", reverse traffic direction, closing vehicle sensing, a 360 degree camera system, and semi-automated parking features.

The X351 is one of the cars used by the British royal family and an armoured car version was used for transporting three former British prime ministers, such as David Cameron, Theresa May, and Boris Johnson. The prime ministerial car, aside from having classified security measures, has armoured under plates and engine plates.

=== Worldwide sales ===
Worldwide sales
Year	2010	2011	2012	2013	2014	2015	2016	Total
Units sold	10,404	15,128	14,988	19,677	18,348	12,536	11,315	102,396

== Electric XJ (cancelled) ==
On 5 July 2019, Jaguar Land Rover confirmed that they intended to build an all-electric XJ luxury saloon car at their Castle Bromwich plant. The car was expected to be launched in 2020. First official images of new generation's taillights were shown. The taillights were shown and based on them the new generation was rendered again in 2020.

On 15 February 2021, Jaguar Land Rover announced that the all-electric XJ project had been shelved, as it was no longer part of the company's current vision. The company said: "Following a thorough technology review against the exponential change in the automotive industry, we concluded that the planned XJ replacement does not fit with our vision for a reimaged Jaguar brand."

== XJ numbering of cars and engines ==
Just prior to World War II, Jaguar, known then as SS Cars, started using a numbering system beginning with the letter X for internal projects. X meaning experimental, XB for military chassis projects, and XF to XK for engines. This numbering system has never been consistent and there appear to be many omissions and duplications.

Number	Project
XJ3	3.4-litre and 3.8-litre S-Type saloon cars (known to the Pressed Steel Company as Utah)
XJ4	Designation of the project which led to what was publicly announced as the XJ6
XJ5	Modifications to the Mark Ten for air conditioning
XJ6	A V12 racing engine with four overhead-camshafts
XJ8	E-Type 2+2 version
XJ13	Jaguar sport-racing mid engined prototype
XJ16	Jaguar 420 saloon
XJ22 and XJ23	E-Type Series Two
XJ27	The Jaguar XJS
XJ40	Second generation Jaguar XJ6 (1986–1994) (as opposed to the Series 2 version of the first generation)
XJ41	Prototype coupé replacement for the XJ-S
XJ42	Prototype drophead replacement for the XJ-S
XJ50	Jaguar XJ12 series three
XJ57 and XJ58	Jaguar XJ-S 3.6-litre (the first Jaguar AJ6 engine)
XJ81	Second generation Jaguar XJ12 (1993–1994)
XJ220	Sports and race car variants developed with Tom Walkinshaw Racing (1992–1994)

== Special uses ==
The Jaguar XJ has been used by British prime ministers. Dating back to the Jaguar XJ (Series III), various versions of the XJ were used by Margaret Thatcher, John Major, Tony Blair, and Gordon Brown. On 11 May 2010, David Cameron took delivery of the dark grey car No. 10 Jaguar XJ (X351) Sentinel as his prime ministerial car. In 2011, Cameron took the delivery of another XJ Sentinel featuring bomb proof doors, bullet proof glass, and armoured plating beneath the floor of the car, respectively replacing the previous XJ Sentinel. The XJ Sentinel was used for transporting Theresa May, and was also used by Boris Johnson. Under Johnson, the XJ was replaced for the first time since 1979 by the Range Rover Abio Sentinel as the prime ministerial car in 2019.

== Bibliography ==
- Berardi, Fabio (2015). Il balzo del Giaguaro. La storia, i modelli, le curiosità e le emozioni sulle Jaguar di ogni epoca (in Italian) (hardcover ed.). EBS Print. ISBN 978-8-8980-4560-0.
- Clarke, R. M. (1989). Jaguar Gold Portfolio: Jaguar XJS 1975–1988 (paperback ed.). Brooklands Books. ISBN 978-18552-0271-9.
- Clarke, R. M. (1991). Jaguar Gold Portfolio: Jaguar XJ5.3 V12 1972–1990 (paperback ed.). Brooklands Books. ISBN 978-1-8552-0083-8.
- Clarke, R. M. (1991). Jaguar Gold Portfolio: Jaguar XJ6 Series III 1979–1986 (paperback ed.). Brooklands Books. ISBN 18-55-20086-4.
- Clarke, R. M. (1995). Jaguar Gold Portfolio: Jaguar XJ6 1968–1979 (paperback ed.). Brooklands Books. ISBN 978-18552-0264-1.
- Clarke, R. M. (2002). Jaguar Gold Portfolio: Jaguar XJ6 1986–1994 (paperback ed.). Brooklands Books. ISBN 978-18552-0321-1.
- Crespin, Peter (2007). All Jaguar/Daimler/VDP Series I, II & III Models 1968 to 1992: The Essential Buyer's Guide (paperback ed.). Veloce Publishing. ISBN 978-1-8458-4119-5.
- Crespin, Peter (2008). Jaguar XJ-S: All 6- and 12-cylinder Models 1975 to 1996: The Essential Buyer's Guide (paperback ed.). Veloce Publishing. ISBN 978-1-8458-4161-4.
- Crespin, Peter (2009). Jaguar/Daimler XJ40 All Models 1984 to 1994: The Essential Buyer's Guide (paperback ed.). Veloce Publishing. ISBN 978-1-8458-4161-4.
- Crespin, Peter (2014). Jaguar/Daimler XJ All Models (Inc. VDP) 1994–2003: The Essential Buyer's Guide (paperback ed.). Veloce Publishing. ISBN 978-1-8458-4200-0.
- Greggio, Fabrizio, ed. (April 2022). "Guida al Collezionismo: Jaguar". Ruoteclassiche (in Italian). No. 138. Editoriale Domus.
- Porter, Philip (1987). Jaguar Project XJ40: The Inside Story of the New XJ6 (1st ed.). Haynes Pubns. ISBN 978-0854-29597-5.
- Robson, Graham (1992). Jaguar XJ Series: The Complete Story (hardcover ed.). Crowood Autoclassics. ISBN 978-1-8522-3689-2.
- Stertkamp, Heiner (2006). Jaguar: Die komplette Chronik von 1922 bis heute (in German). Heel-Verlag. ISBN 3-89880-337-6.
- Thorley, Nigel (1991). Jaguar XJ: The Complete Companion (paperback ed.). Motorbooks. ISBN 978-1-8709-7922-1.
- Thorley, Nigel (2002). You and Your Jaguar XJ40: Buying, Enjoyning, Maintaining, Nodifying (hardcover ed.). Haynes Publishing. ISBN 978-1-8596-0862-3.
- Thorley, Nigel (2003). Jaguar: All the Cars. Haynes Publishing. ISBN 1-84425-001-6.
- Thorley, Nigel (2006). Original Jaguar XJ (Original Series): The Restorer's Guide (paperback ed.). Motorbooks. ISBN 978-07603-2702-9.
- Thorley, Nigel (2012). Jaguar XJ6, XJ8 & XJR All 2003 to 2009 (X-350) Models Including Daimler: The Essential Buyer's Guide (paperback ed.). Veloce Publishing. ISBN 978-1-8458-4434-9.
- Thorley, Nigel (2019). The Complete Book of Jaguar: Every Model Since 1935 (hardcover ed.). Motorbooks. ISBN 978-0-7603-6390-4.
