= Jaguar XJR =

Jaguar XJR is a nameplate used by Jaguar Cars for several line of vehicles:

- Jaguar XJR Sportscars, a line of Group C race cars.
- Several high performance versions of the company's flagship XJ saloons.
