= Jaguar XJ (X300) =

Saloon car (1994–1997)

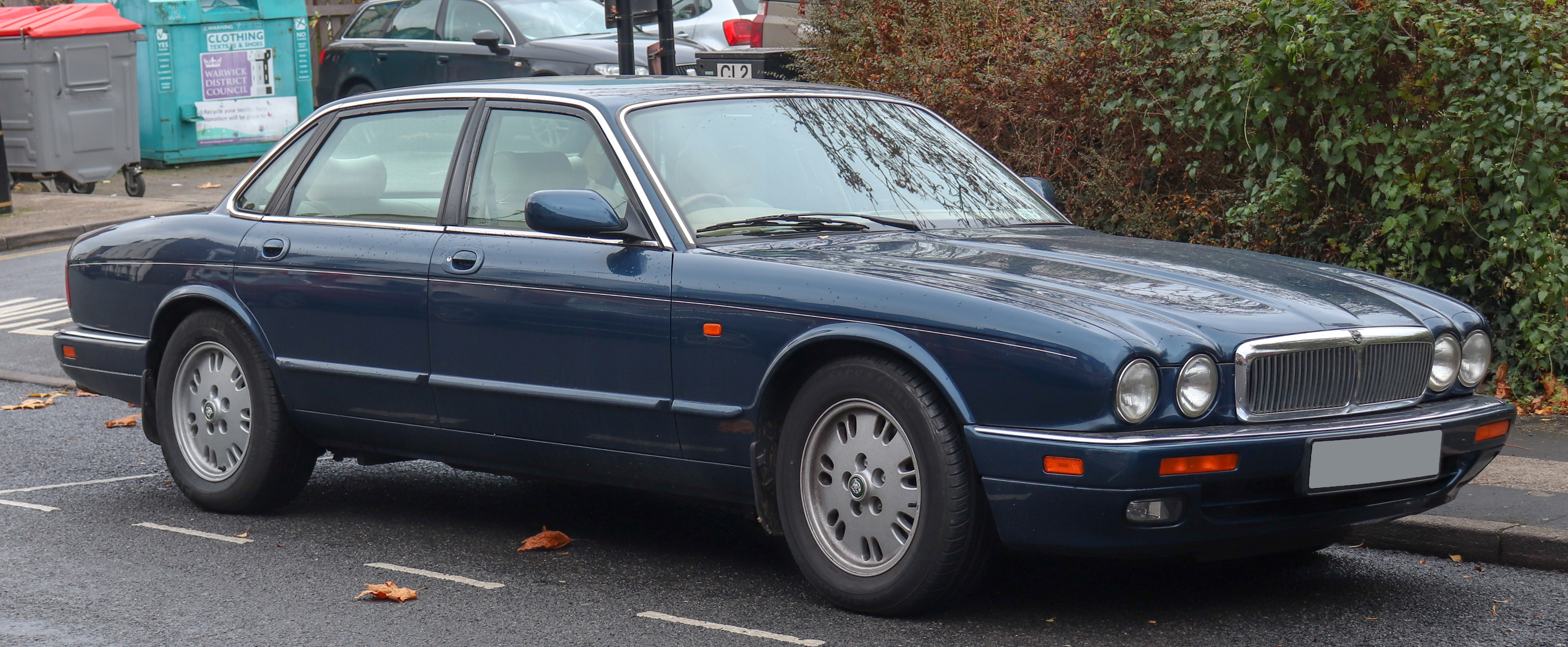
- A 1996 Jaguar XJ6 3.2

Overview
- Manufacturer: Jaguar Cars
- Model code: X300; X305 (XJ12); X306 (XJR); X330 (LWB)
- Also called: Daimler Century; Daimler Six; Daimler Double Six; Jaguar XJ Sport; Jaguar XJR; Jaguar Sovereign; Jaguar Vanden Plas
- Production: July 1994 – June 1997; 92,038 produced
- Assembly: United Kingdom: Coventry, England
- Designer: Geoff Lawson (1991)

Body and chassis
- Class: Full-size luxury car (F)
- Body style: 4-door saloon car
- Layout: Front-engine, rear-wheel-drive

Powertrain
- Engine: 3.2 L AJ16 I6; 4.0 L AJ16 I6; 4.0 L supercharged AJ16 I6; 6.0 L Jaguar V12
- Transmission: 4-speed ZF 4HP-22 automatic; 4-speed ZF 4HP-24 automatic; 4-speed GM 4L80-E automatic; 5-speed Getrag 290 manual

Dimensions
- Wheelbase: SWB: 2,870 mm (113 in); LWB: 2,995 mm (117.9 in)
- Length: SWB: 5,024 mm (197.8 in); LWB: 5,149 mm (202.7 in)
- Width: 1,799 mm (70.8 in) (exc. mirrors); 2,074 mm (81.7 in) (inc. mirrors)
- Height: Comfort SWB: 1,314 mm (51.7 in); Sport SWB: 1,307 mm (51.5 in); XJR: 1,303 mm (51.3 in); Comfort LWB: 1,333 mm (52.5 in); Sport LWB: 1,326 mm (52.2 in)
- Kerb weight: XJ6: 1,800 kg (4,000 lb); Daimler Six: 1,825 kg (4,023 lb); XJ12/Daimler Double Six: 1,975 kg (4,354 lb); XJR: 1,875 kg (4,134 lb)

Chronology
- Predecessor: Jaguar XJ (XJ40)
- Successor: Jaguar XJ (X308)

The Jaguar XJ (X300) is a full-size luxury saloon car manufactured by Jaguar Cars between 1994 and 1997. It was the first Jaguar XJ produced entirely under Ford Motor Company ownership, and can be considered an evolution of the outgoing XJ40 generation. Like all previous XJ generations, it features the Jaguar independent rear suspension arrangement. The design of the X300 placed emphasis on improved build quality, improved reliability, and a return to traditional Jaguar styling elements.

At the car's launch in October 1994 at the Paris Motor Show, Jaguar marketing material made use of the phrase "New Series XJ" to describe the X300 models. The X300 series represented the result of a £200 million facilities renewal program by Ford. The program introduced state-of-the-art automated body welding robots manufactured by Nissan, and was intended to show the future direction of the British auto industry. The X300 went on to become one of Jaguar's most successful models.

== Exterior ==
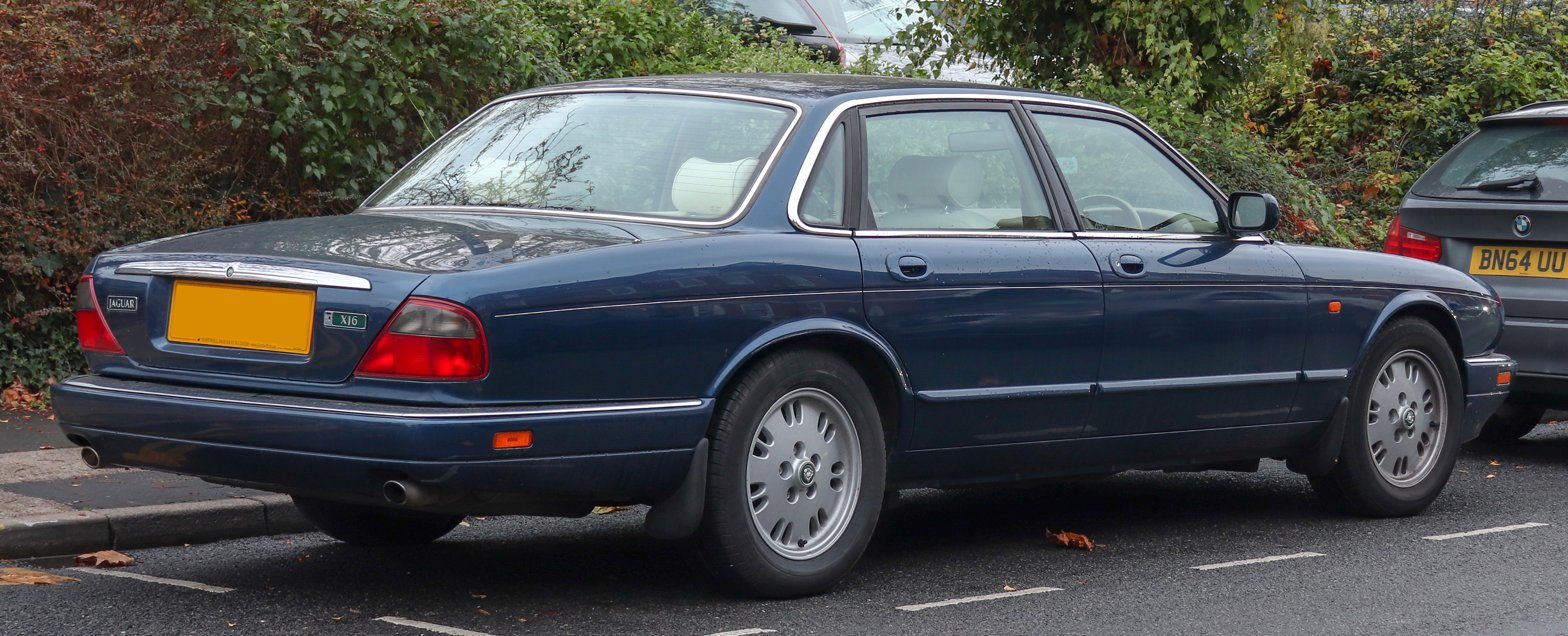
Rear view of a 1996 Jaguar XJ 3.2

Aesthetically, the X300 received several updates in the design refresh led by Geoff Lawson in 1991. The mostly flat bonnet of the XJ40 was replaced with a fluted, curvaceous design that accentuated the four separate round headlamps. Rear wings were reshaped to accommodate the new wrap-around rear light clusters. Additionally, the separate black-rubber bumper bar of the XJ40 was replaced with a fully integrated body-coloured bumper. The Jaguar leaper bonnet mascot was installed only on cars for non-European markets. These vehicles feature 8 disc tumbler Tibbe lock barrels similar to Ford vehicles at the time, except Ford used a 6 disc lock hence the key blade and barrels being shorter on Ford models. Aston Martin also used the same locks as fitted to these Jaguars.

== Interior ==
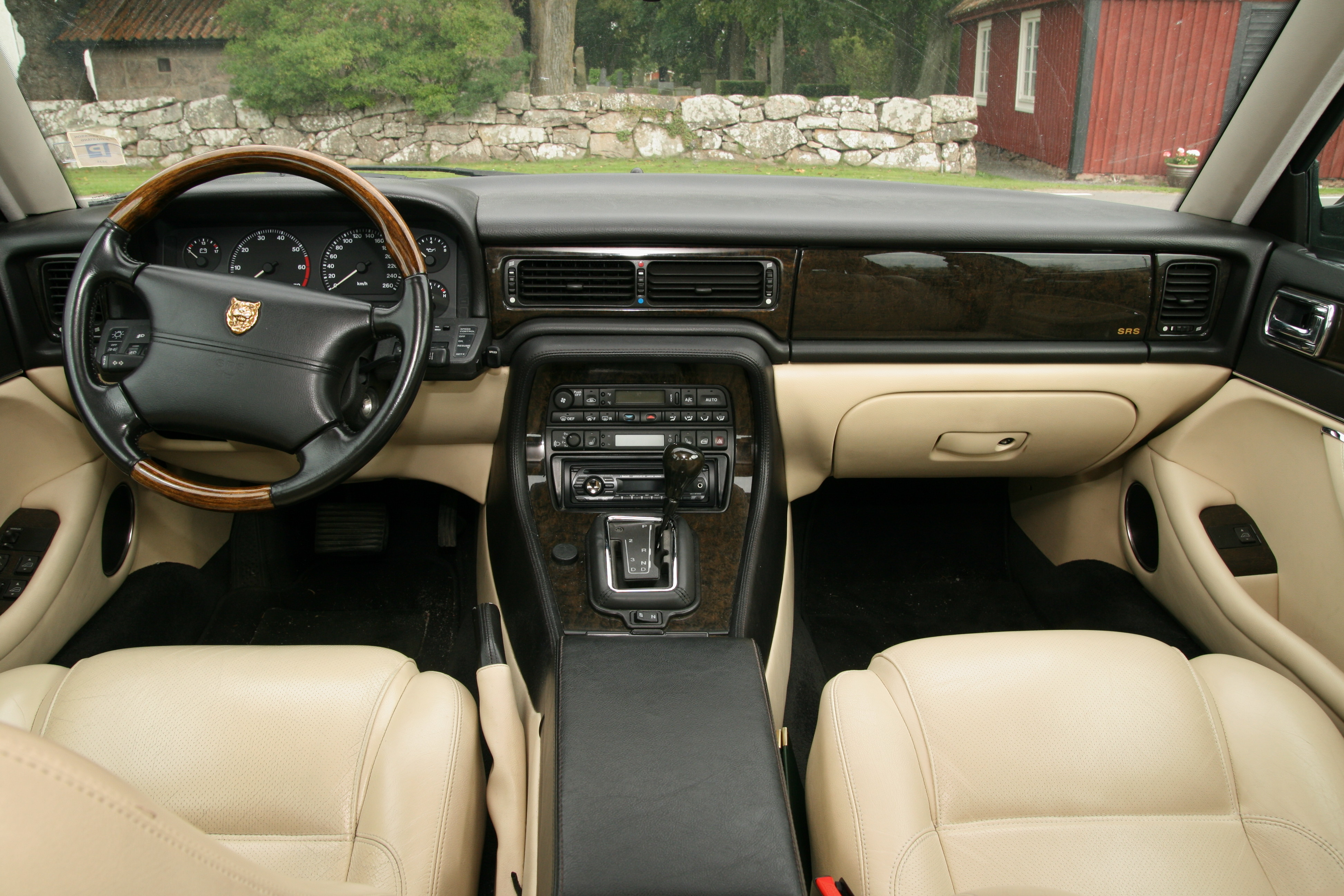
Interior of a 1995 Sport model

The interior of the X300 was similar to that found in the XJ40, with some revisions. The seats were updated to have a more rounded profile, wood trim was updated with bevelled edges, and the steering wheel was redesigned. Early X300 cars were built without a front passenger glove-box, due to space constraints caused by the introduction of a front-passenger airbag.

== Mechanicals ==
After the XJ40, what became the X300 was not supposed to happen, as Jaguar's intention was to launch a brand new saloon with a new V8 engine. Ford halted development of the saloon, termed XJ90, and proposed to install its new engine and front and rear ends onto the centre section of the XJ40 model; however, the V8 was not ready, and would not be so until the X300's successor, the XJ X308.

Jaguar's V12 engine and AJ6 inline-six (AJ16) engine were both available in various X300 models, although they received significant updates. Both engines were fitted with distributorless electronic engine management systems. The V12's new management system was designed by Nippon Denso. The top aluminium cover in the engine's valley was redesigned to house two packs of three coils each, with each coil having two high-tension terminals for a total of twelve. These coilpacks were driven by two Denso ignition modules, which are very similar to Ford EDIS-6 units. The crankshaft in the V12 was switched from a forging to a chill casting. A visibly significant chromed pipe connecting the left and the right banks of the V12 in the XJ40 platform (intended to vent and route the crankcase blow-by gas to the intake plenum) was changed with the introduction of the X300 to an almost invisible design at the top center of the engine underneath a plastic cover that also hides fuel rails and coilpacks.

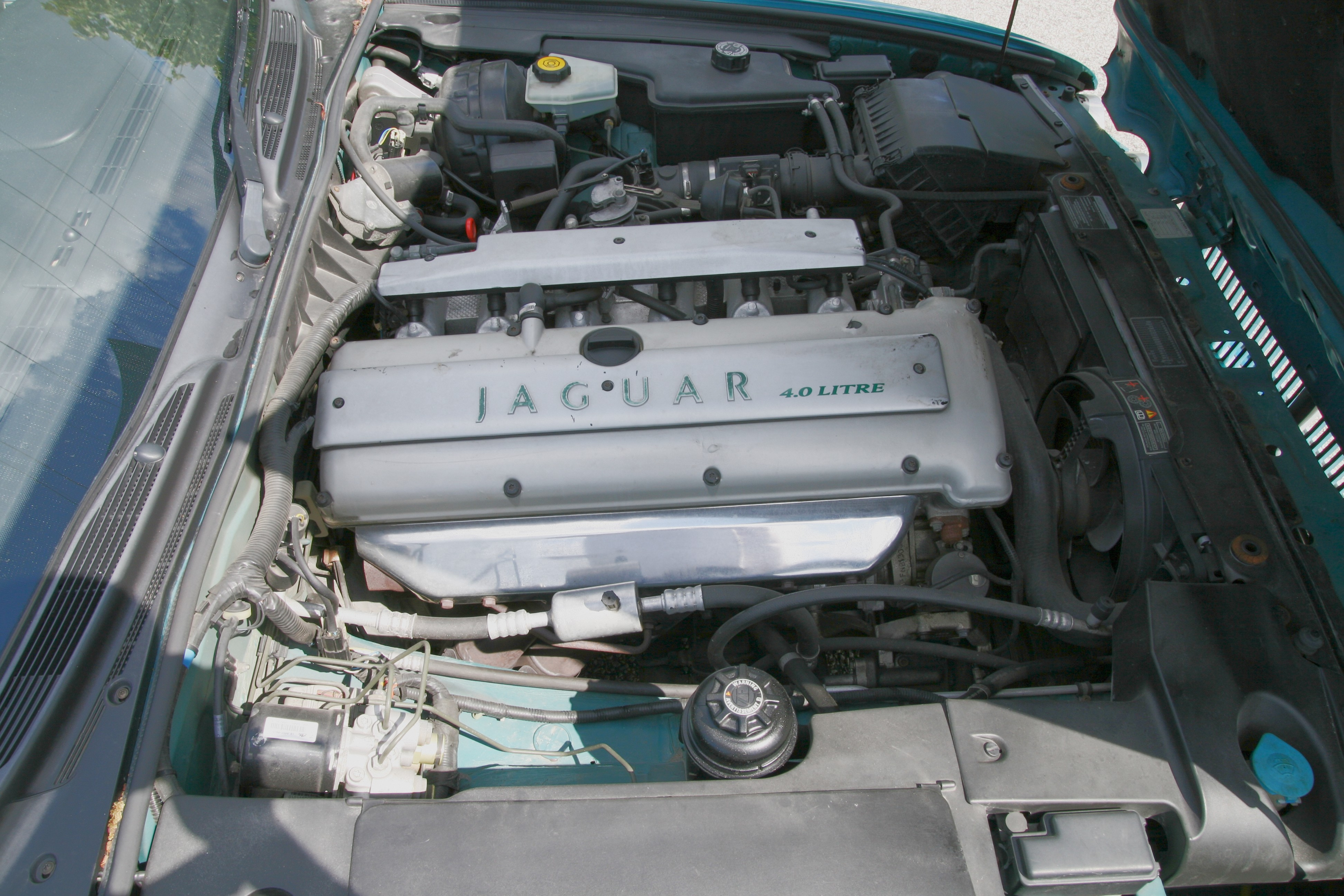
The 4.0-litre AJ16 inline-6 engine

For the inline 6 cylinder engine, magnesium-alloy valve covers and revised pistons featured in the engine, which was given the designation AJ16. It was found in 4.0 L supercharged form in the XJR. The normally aspirated six-cylinder X300 cars used either a ZF four-speed automatic gearbox (4HP-22 on the 3.2 L and 4HP-24 on the 4.0 L), or a Getrag 290 five-speed manual. The 4HP-22 automatic is mechanically controlled while the 4HP-24 is electronically controlled, allowing 4.0-litre models to offer Normal and Sport modes on a switch by the gear lever. This switch is replaced with a blanking plate on the 3.2 L. The supercharged six-cylinder engine in the XJR was normally built with the optional GM 4L80-E four-speed automatic and very few XJRs were ordered with the standard specification Getrag 290. All V12-equipped cars were built with the GM 4L80-E automatic. In certain markets, such as North America, no manual gearbox was offered.

The X300 was the first XJ to be affected directly by Jaguar's takeover in 1990 by the Ford Motor Company. According to David Versical of Automotive News, Ford's influence was evident more in terms of "product development processes than its parts bin". Versical added that the XJ's new "traction control system came via Ford's Mondeo program" and it also featured "a Nippondenso air conditioner sourced through Ford's purchasing channels."

== Models ==
The X300 was available in both short- and long-wheelbase body styles and in various trim levels. Some markets had a limited selection of X300 models or features. For example, the North American XJ6 was only available with the 4.0 L engine, and all cars sold there were equipped with alloy wheels, a leather interior, and air conditioning. North America did not receive the Sport, Executive, or Century models, nor was a manual transmission offered. Power folding mirrors were standard in Japan and optional in all other markets except the USA.

=== XJ6 ===
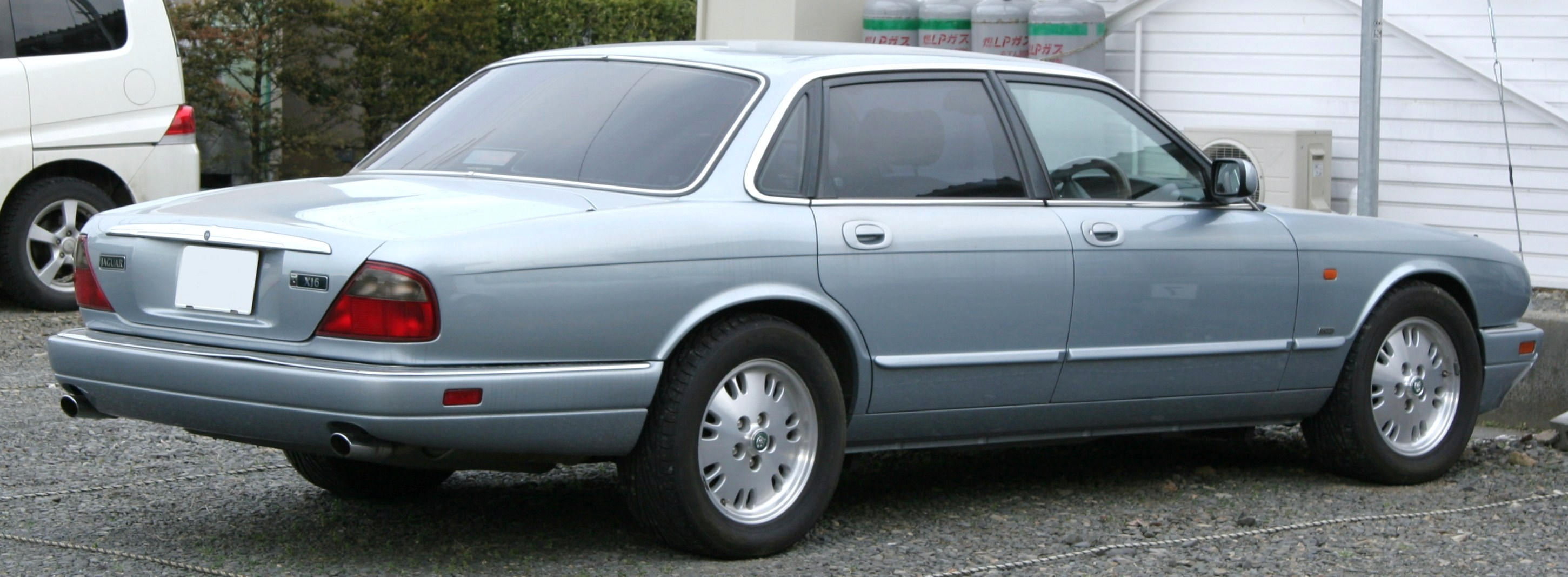
Rear of a Jaguar XJ6

The base model in the range was the XJ6, which featured the 3.2 L version of the AJ16. On these base cars, aluminium alloy wheels, leather upholstery, and air conditioning were all extra-cost options. Later, the 4.0 L version of the AJ16 was offered in the XJ6.

=== Sovereign ===
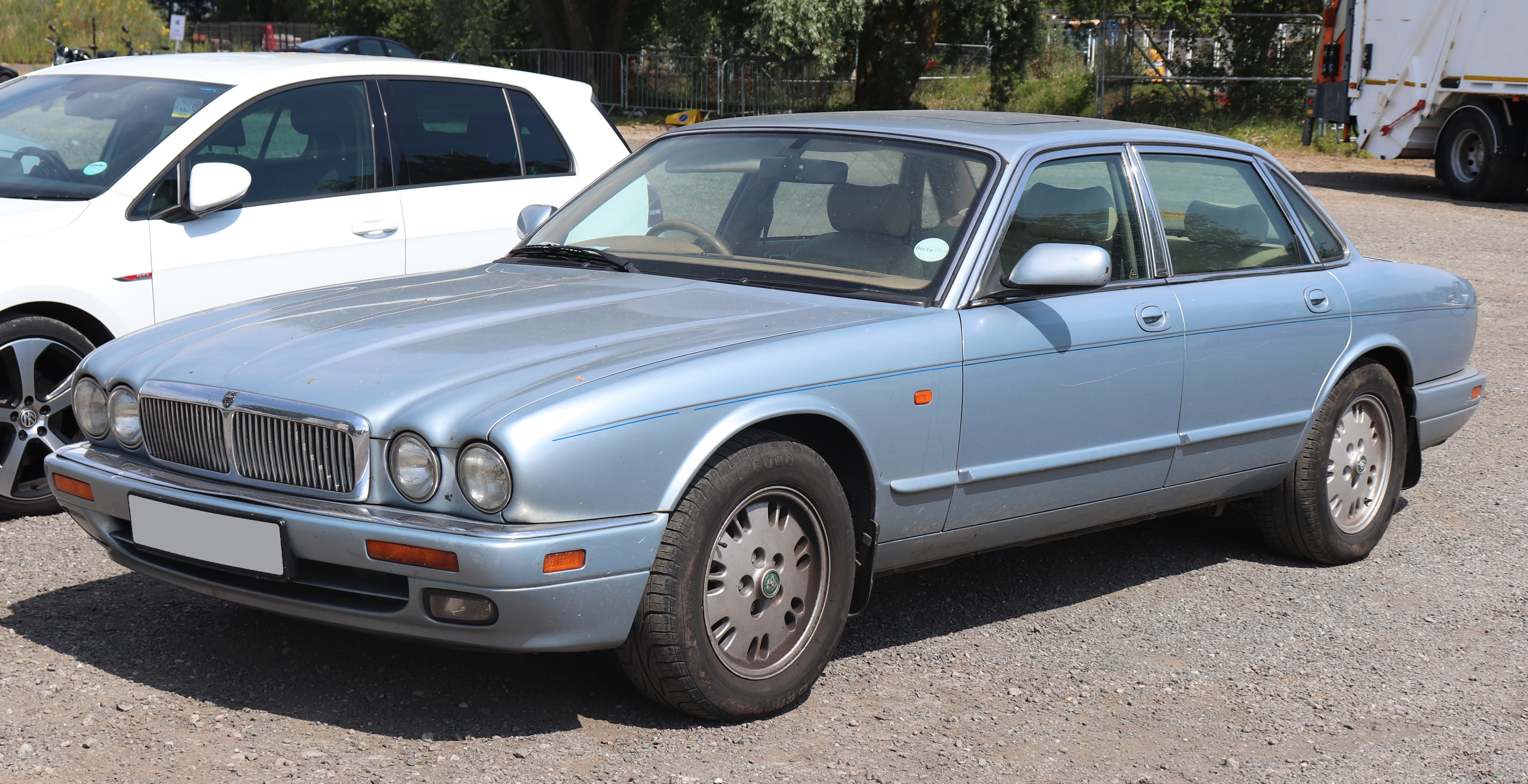
A 1995 Jaguar Sovereign 4.0

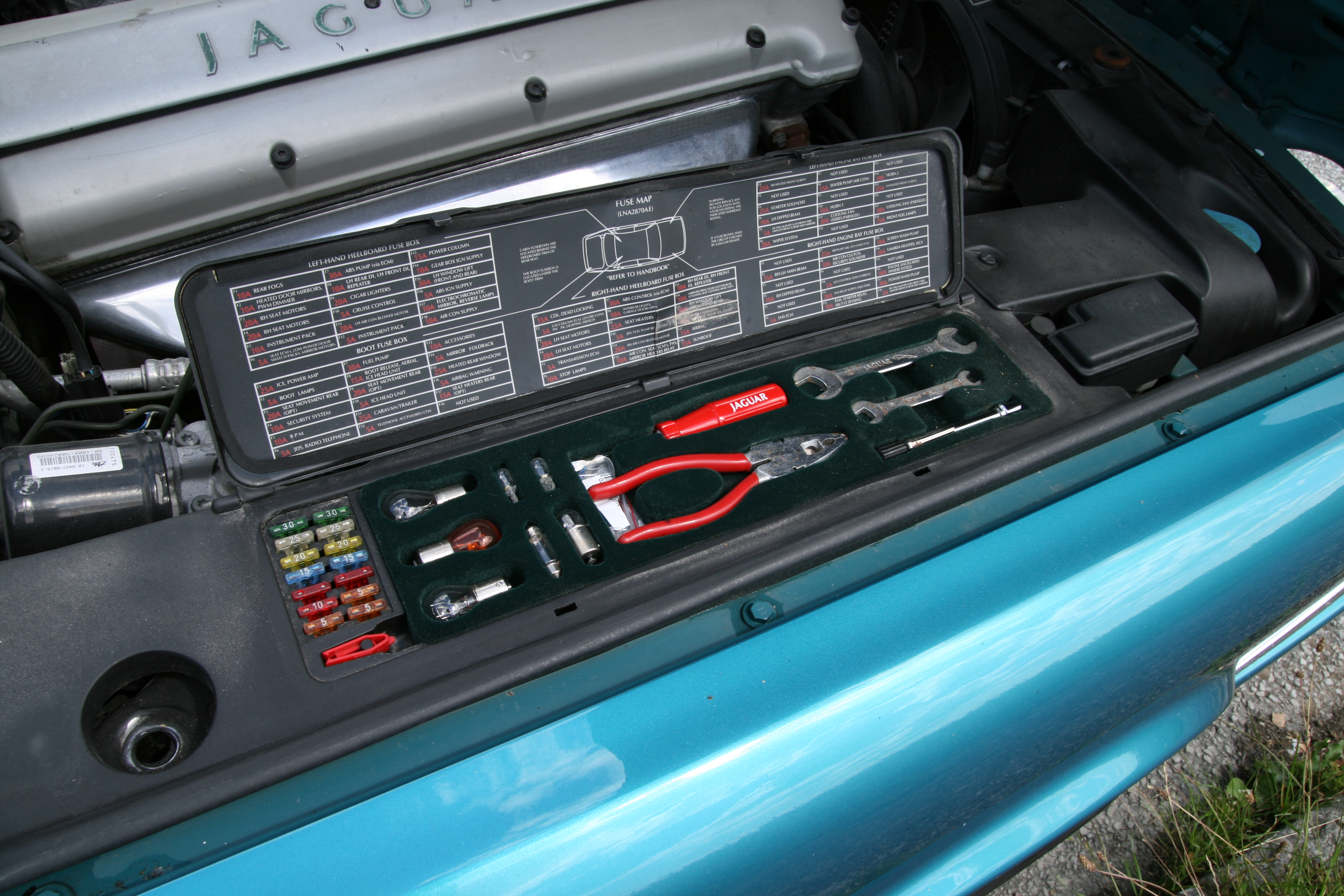
The tool kit offered with the Sovereign

The Sovereign model used the AJ16 engine in either 3.2 L or 4.0 L form, and came equipped with luxury features as standard such as ten-way electric leather seats with three-way memory on the driver's side, cruise control, automatic climate control and a tool kit located under the bonnet. The exterior of the Sovereign was adorned with chromed trim in various locations: on the radiator grille, rear light cluster surrounds, windscreen and rear window surrounds, rain gutters, window frames, and boot-lid plinth.

=== XJ Sport ===
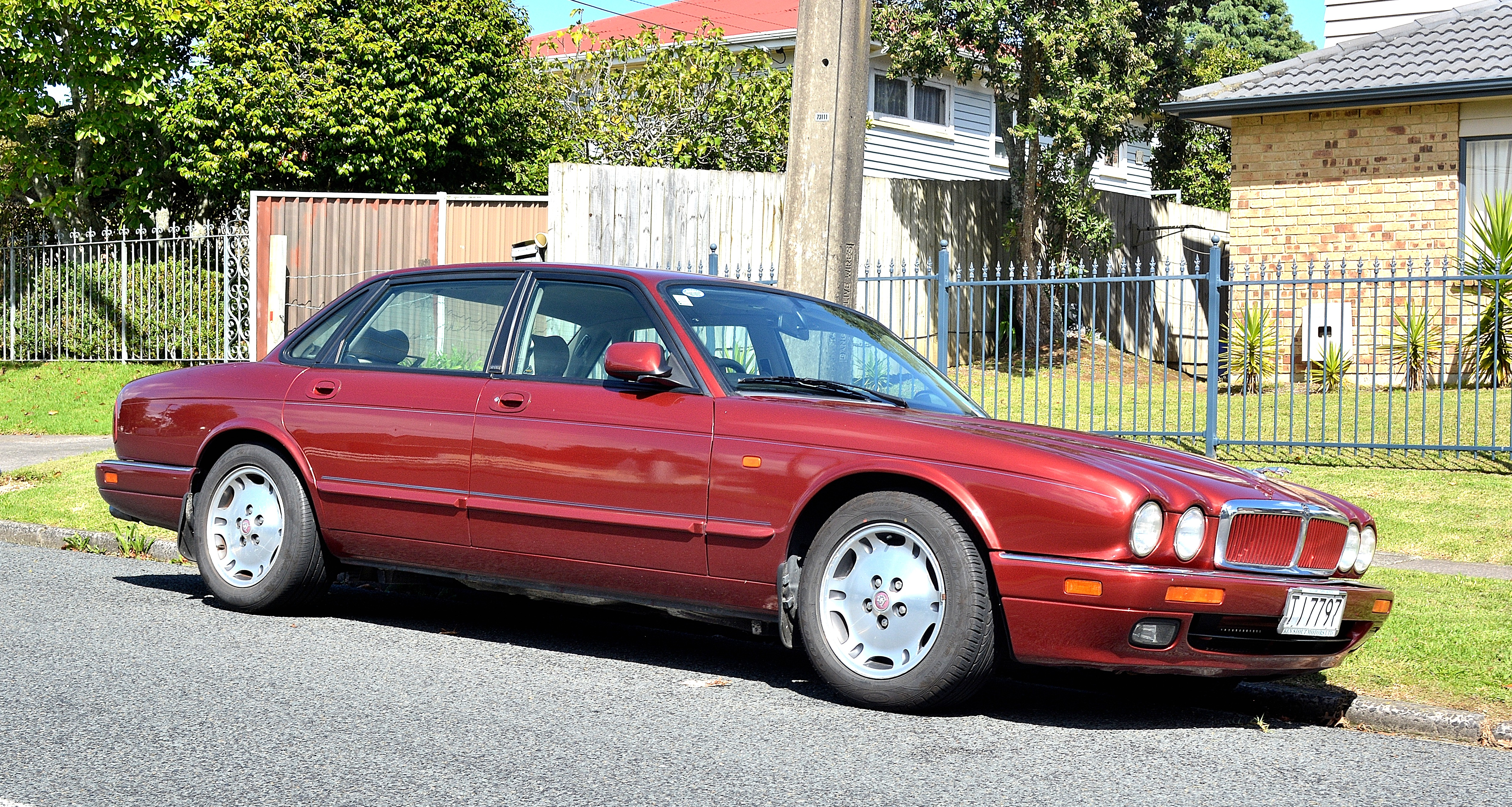
A 1994 Jaguar XJ 4.0 Sport

To attract younger buyers, Jaguar offered a Sport model with wider 8-inch wheels, revised seats, and stiffer suspension. The Sport kept the matte-black window surrounds from the base model, and is identified by Sport badges on the B-pillars and XJ Sport badging on the rear. The sports suspension, along with the wider wheels, were also available as an option on both SWB and LWB XJ6 and Sovereign models.

=== Executive ===
Aimed at a younger market segment, the Executive model was introduced for the 1997 model year and featured leather trim, a wood/leather steering wheel, wide wheels (similar to the Sport model), and air conditioning. It was treated as a run-out specification for the XJ6 and so separate production numbers are not available.

=== Long Wheelbase (X330) ===
For the 1996 model year, a long wheelbase version of the body shell was introduced, adding an extra 5 inches (130 mm) for rear seat occupants and an extra inch of headroom. This body style was available for all of the classic models (XJ, Sovereign, and XJ12) but not the sport models (XJ Sport and XJR). There were two X330 variants, one with five seats and one with four, which featured a raised centre console between the two adjustable rear seats.

Internally, Jaguar referred to the long wheel base version as the X330 Majestic, although unlike the XJ40 they were never badged as such. The X330 bodies were built on the standard production line, whereas the XJ40 Majestic started as a SWB body which was then taken away and stretched by Project Aerospace in Coventry, before being returned and fitted out by Jaguar Special Vehicle Operations. This meant the X330 carried a premium over the standard models, as compared to its predecessor.

=== XJR (X306) ===
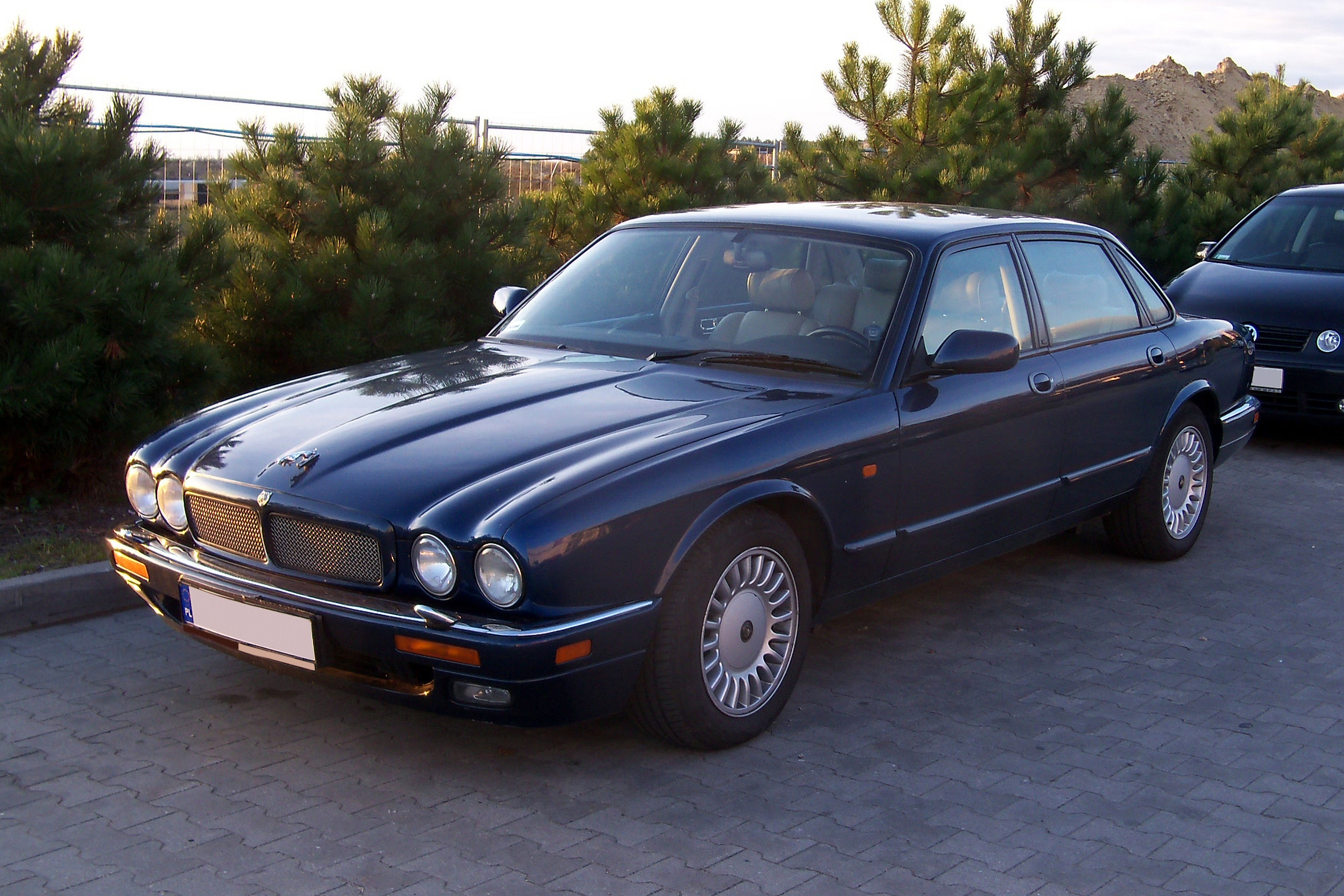
Front of a Jaguar XJR

The XJR was introduced as a high-performance sport model, and it was Jaguar's first-ever supercharged road car and only the second Jaguar road car to use forced induction, after the Jaguar XJ220, which was turbocharged. The output of the six-cylinder AJ16 engine was increased to 321 hp (239 kW; 325 PS) and 378 lb⋅ft (512 N⋅m) with the use of an Eaton M90 supercharger and an air-water intercooler. The 0 to 97 km/h (0 to 60 mph) acceleration time was generally around the 5.9 for the manual transmission car to 6.6 second mark for the automatic. The XJR was fitted with larger 17 inches wheels, compared to 16 inches on the rest of the range, along Pirelli P-Zero tyres, with 10 mm lower firmer suspension and traction control. Almost all of the 6,547 XJR production cars were built with the optional GM 4L80-E automatic gearbox, although the Getrag 290 five-speed manual gearbox was the standard offering; only 268 were made, 102 in RHD for the United Kingdom market and the rest in LHD mainly in Europe with Italy taking 57. The manual transmission was not offered in North America.

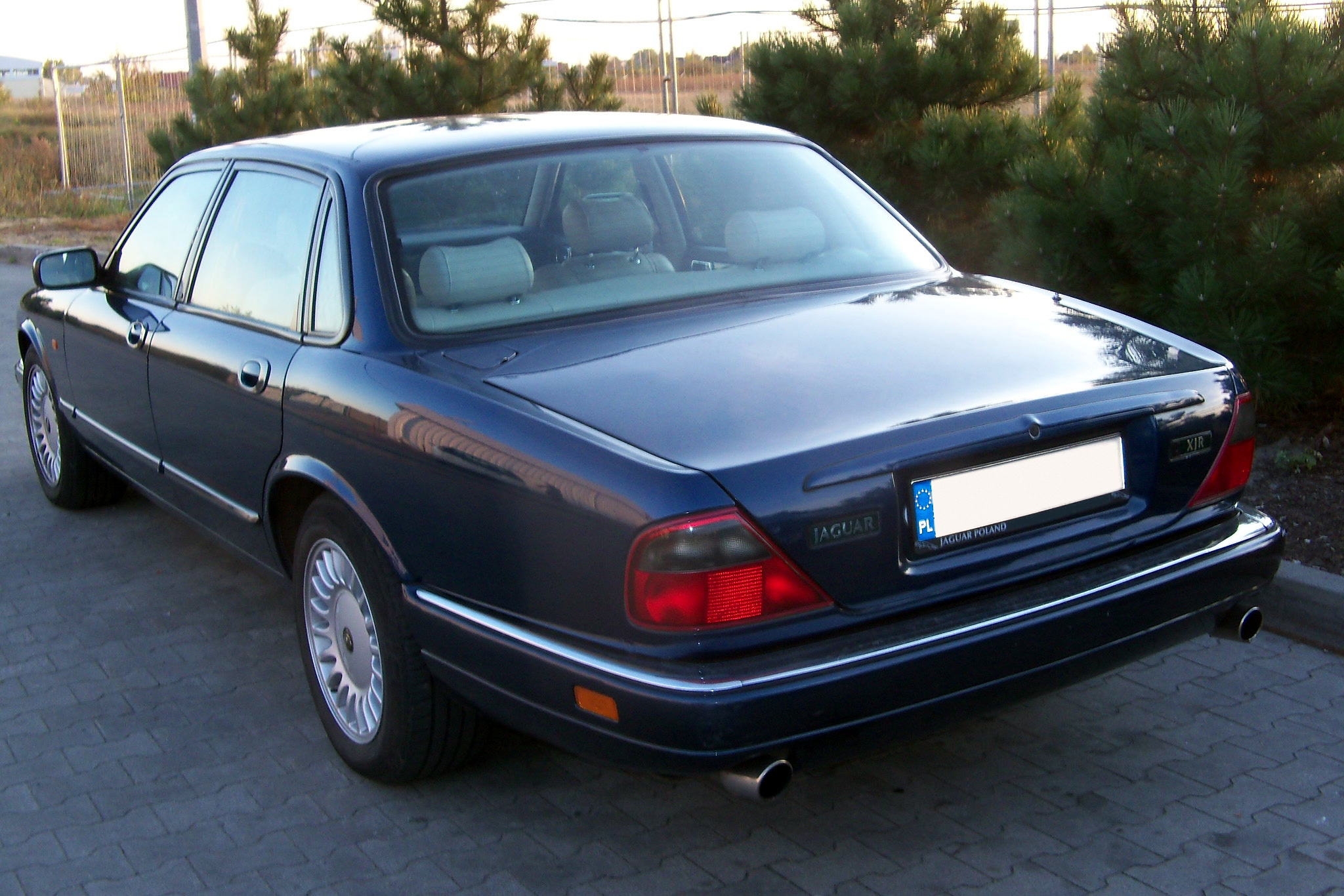
Rear of a Jaguar XJR

Cosmetically, the XJR differed from the standard cars with a body-coloured grille surround, mesh grille insert, body-coloured boot-lid plinth, larger exhaust outlets, special five-spoke Sport alloy wheels, and XJR badging. Rain gutters and window surrounds were matte black, except on North American models where they were polished stainless steel. This generation of the XJR model carries the code name X306. It is also sometimes referred to as the XJR6 to differentiate it from the later V8-engined Jaguar XJ (X308) XJR.

=== XJ12 (X305) ===
The XJ12 model, which carries the code name X305 along with the short wheel base Daimler Double Six, featured the same trim level of the Sovereign but was powered by the 6.0 L version of the Jaguar V12 engine. It is visually differentiated by the rear boot-lid XJ12 badge, a V12 insignia inlaid on the passenger-side dashboard wood panel, a V12 badge on each B-pillar, chromed door mirrors and a gold-coloured Jaguar crest at the top of the radiator grille surround. Only available transmission was a 4-speed automatic GM 4L80-E. In the United States market, this generation of the XJ12 was available only as model years 1995, which were all short-wheelbase, and 1996, which were all long. The X305 was equipped with an On-Board Diagnostics System; however, it failed to fully meet the OBD-II specifications, which became mandatory for the 1996 model year in the United States. With a special dispensation for that model year expired, no 1997 model year X305 models were sold in North America. In 2001, the United States EPA and Jaguar Cars entered into a settlement that extended the emissions warranty on 1995 and 1996 model year XJ12 saloon cars to 14 years or 150,000 miles due to their non-compliant NipponDenso Engine Management System, which was unable to provide continuous misfire monitoring, a requirement for OBDII compliance.

While the similar Daimler Double Six came with 225/60-16 tyres on 7-inch wheels and comfort suspension as standard, the XJ12 came with 225/55-16 tyres on 8-inch wide wheels and sports suspension, which explains the height difference between the two models. The last Jaguar to be powered by a V12 engine was a green LWB XJ12, registered P60 SOV, which left the production line on 17 April 1997. It was placed in the Jaguar Daimler Heritage Trust museum in Coventry before its closure, and was moved to the Jaguar Collection at the British Motor Museum at Gaydon in Warwickshire.

=== Daimler/Jaguar Vanden Plas ===
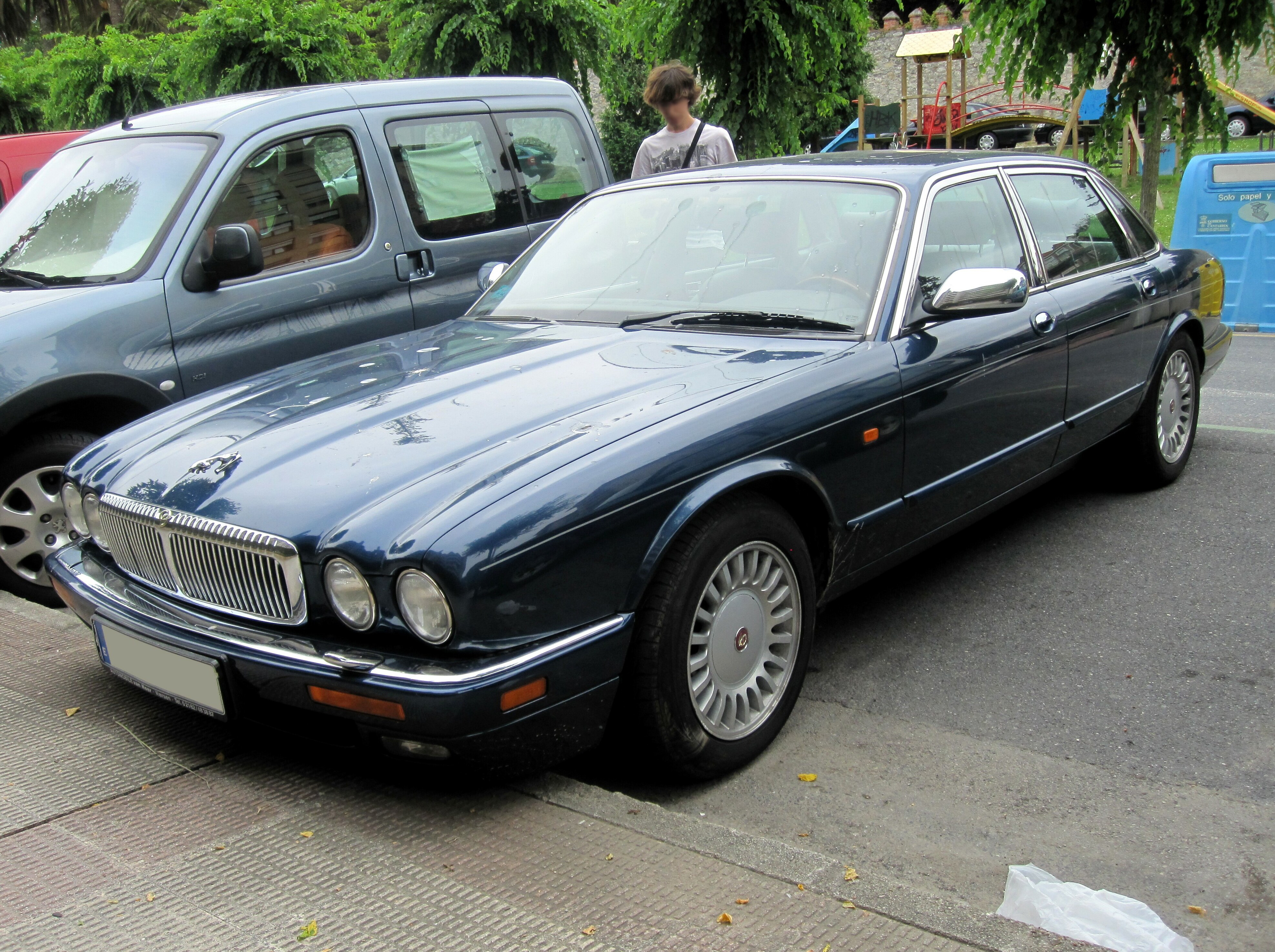
A Daimler Double-Six

The Daimler name was applied to the highest trim level of the X300 cars, and featured all the chrome brightwork found on the Sovereign cars, plus chromed door mirrors, chromed door handles, and a fluted radiator grille surround & boot (trunk) finisher. Most of the optional extra features on the X300 range were all standard for the Daimler, such as heated front seats, heated front screen, sunroof & cruise control, plus for the Daimlers only fluted leather door pockets, picnic tables for rear passengers on the back of the front seats and special marquetry veneer. The Daimler Six model was equipped with the AJ16 engine, and the Daimler Double Six with the V12; both available in short or long wheel base.

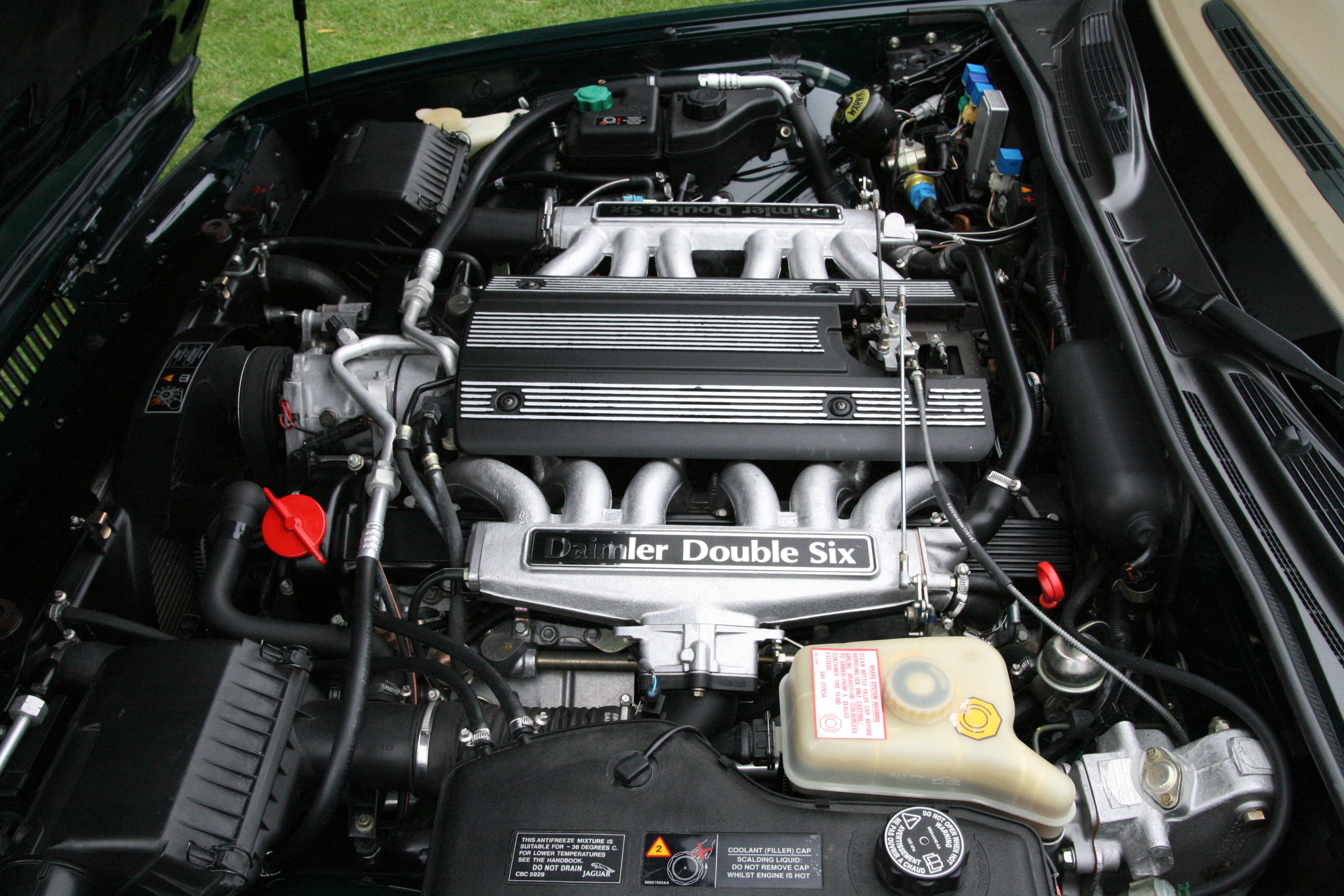
V12 in a 1994 Daimler Double Six

In some markets, such as North America, the name Jaguar Vanden Plas was used instead of Daimler. Vanden Plas X300 cars in the United States after MY 1995 are all built on the long-wheelbase body shell, although they were only available with the six-cylinder engine, leaving the V12 available solely in the XJ12 model for that market. 1995 Vanden Plas cars are all short wheelbase cars.

=== Daimler Century ===
In 1996, the Century model was introduced to commemorate the centennial of the Daimler name. The Century was equipped with all features and upgrades available on the X300 cars, plus chromed wheels, special exterior paint, and electrically adjustable rear seats.

=== Daimler Corsica concept ===
A single two-door XJ convertible was built in 1996 to commemorate Daimler Company's centenary. The concept car, called the Daimler Corsica, was based on the Daimler Double-Six saloon and can seat four. The prototype, which lacked an engine, had all the luxury features of an XJ saloon car but a shorter wheelbase. It is painted in a colour called Seafrost, which was later discontinued. The Daimler Corsica was named after the 1931 Daimler Double-Six Corsica. The concept was a one-off, and may have been intended for limited production beginning in 1997. The car has made a limited number of appearances at car shows and events since 1996. It has most recently appeared at the Jaguars at Oulton – Cheshire Cats event at Oulton Park race track, Cheshire, in August 2026. The Daimler Corsica prototype is owned by the Jaguar Daimler Heritage Trust, who have commissioned it to operate as a fully functional road-legal car. It was on display at their museum at Browns Lane in Coventry but is now on display in the Jaguar Collection at the British Motor Museum at Gaydon, Warwickshire. The car has also been displayed at Harewood House as part of the Jaguar Enthusiasts' Club show.

== Special uses ==
The car was used by several British prime ministers, such as Margaret Thatcher, John Major, and Tony Blair. Successive versions of the XJ were used as the prime ministerial car by Gordon Brown, David Cameron, Theresa May, and Boris Johnson.

== Production numbers ==
Model	Production
XJ6 3.2	17,346
XJ6 3.2 (LWB)	747
XJ6 4.0	2,474
XJ6 4.0 (LWB)	203
XJ Sport 3.2	7,165
XJ Sport 4.0	2,534
Sovereign 3.2	2,377
Sovereign 3.2 (LWB)	305
Sovereign 4.0	28,490
Sovereign 4.0 (LWB)	4,973
XJR	6,547
XJ12 (ROW)	673
XJ12 (ROW, LWB)	56
XJ12 (NAS)	564
XJ12 (NAS, LWB)	535
Daimler Six	1,362
Daimler Six (LWB)	1,330
Daimler Double Six	1,007
Daimler Double Six (LWB)	1,230
Daimler Century Six	100
Daimler Century Double Six	100
Vanden Plas 4.0	3,831
Vanden Plas 4.0 (LWB)	7,989
Total	92,038
