= Jaguar XJ (X308) =

Saloon car (1997–2003)

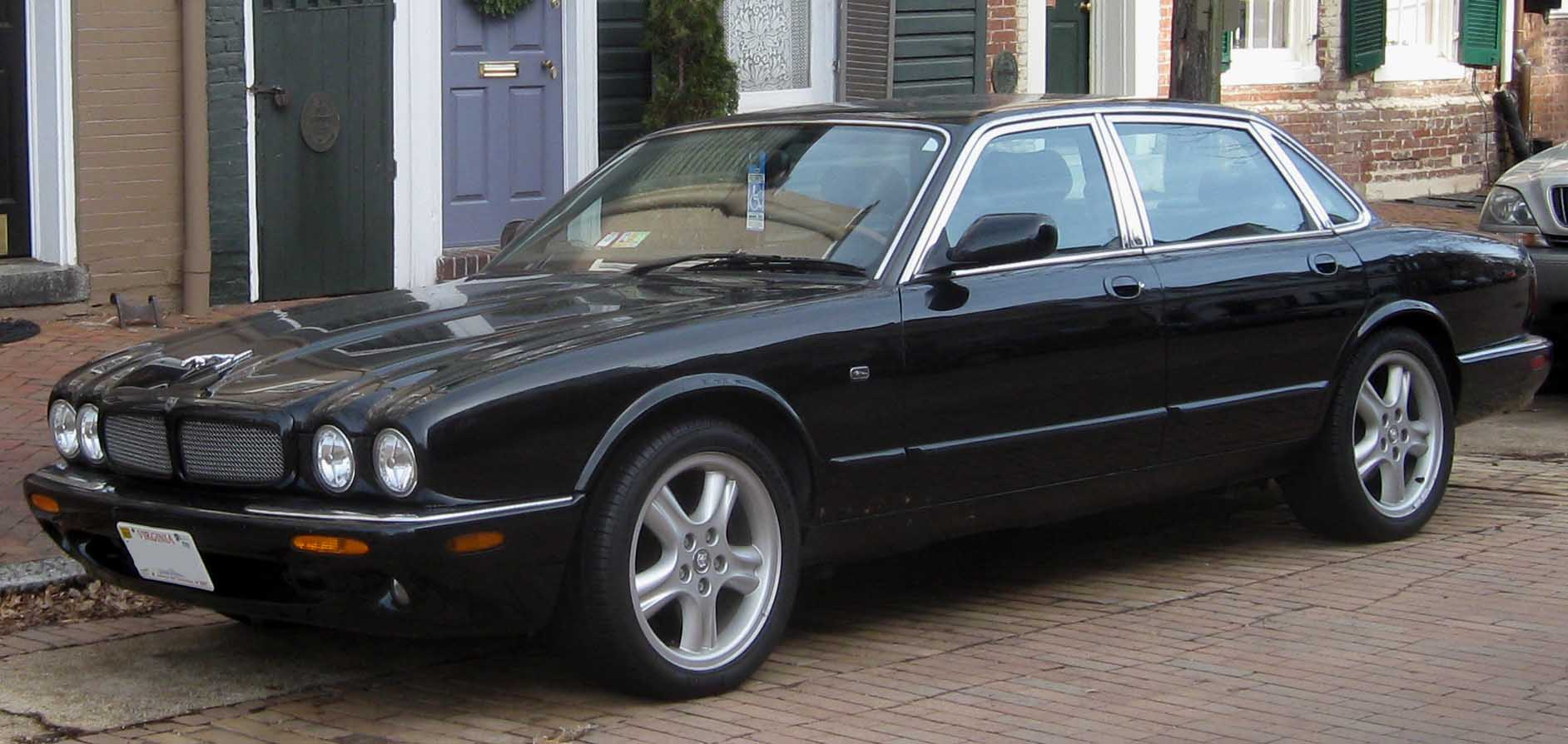
- A North American version of the Jaguar XJR

Overview
- Manufacturer: Jaguar Cars
- Model code: X308
- Also called: Jaguar Sovereign; Jaguar Vanden Plas; Jaguar XJR; Daimler Eight; Daimler Super V8
- Production: July 1997 – December 2002
- Model years: 1998–2003
- Assembly: United Kingdom: Coventry, England
- Designer: Geoff Lawson (1995)

Body and chassis
- Class: Full-size luxury car (F)
- Body style: 4-door saloon
- Layout: Front-engine, rear-wheel-drive

Powertrain
- Engine: 3.2 L Jaguar AJ-V8; 4.0 L Jaguar AJ-V8; 4.0 L supercharged Jaguar AJ-V8
- Transmission: 5-speed ZF 5HP24 automatic; 5-speed Mercedes-Benz W5A580 automatic (supercharged models only)

Dimensions
- Wheelbase: SWB: 2,870 mm (113 in); LWB: 2,995 mm (117.9 in)
- Length: SWB: 5,024 mm (197.8 in); LWB: 5,149 mm (202.7 in)
- Width: 1,799 mm (70.8 in)
- Height: SWB: 1,314 mm (51.7 in); LWB: 1,333 mm (52.5 in)
- Kerb weight: SWB: 1,800 kg (3,968 lb); LWB: 1,875 kg (4,134 lb)

Chronology
- Predecessor: Jaguar XJ (X300)
- Successor: Jaguar XJ (X350)

The Jaguar XJ (X308) is a full-size luxury saloon car made by Jaguar Cars from 1997 until 2002. It has a Jaguar AJ-V8 engine and Jaguar independent rear suspension. It was the third and final evolution of the Jaguar XJ40 platform that had been in production since 1986. It was preceded by the Jaguar XJ (X300).

== Exterior ==
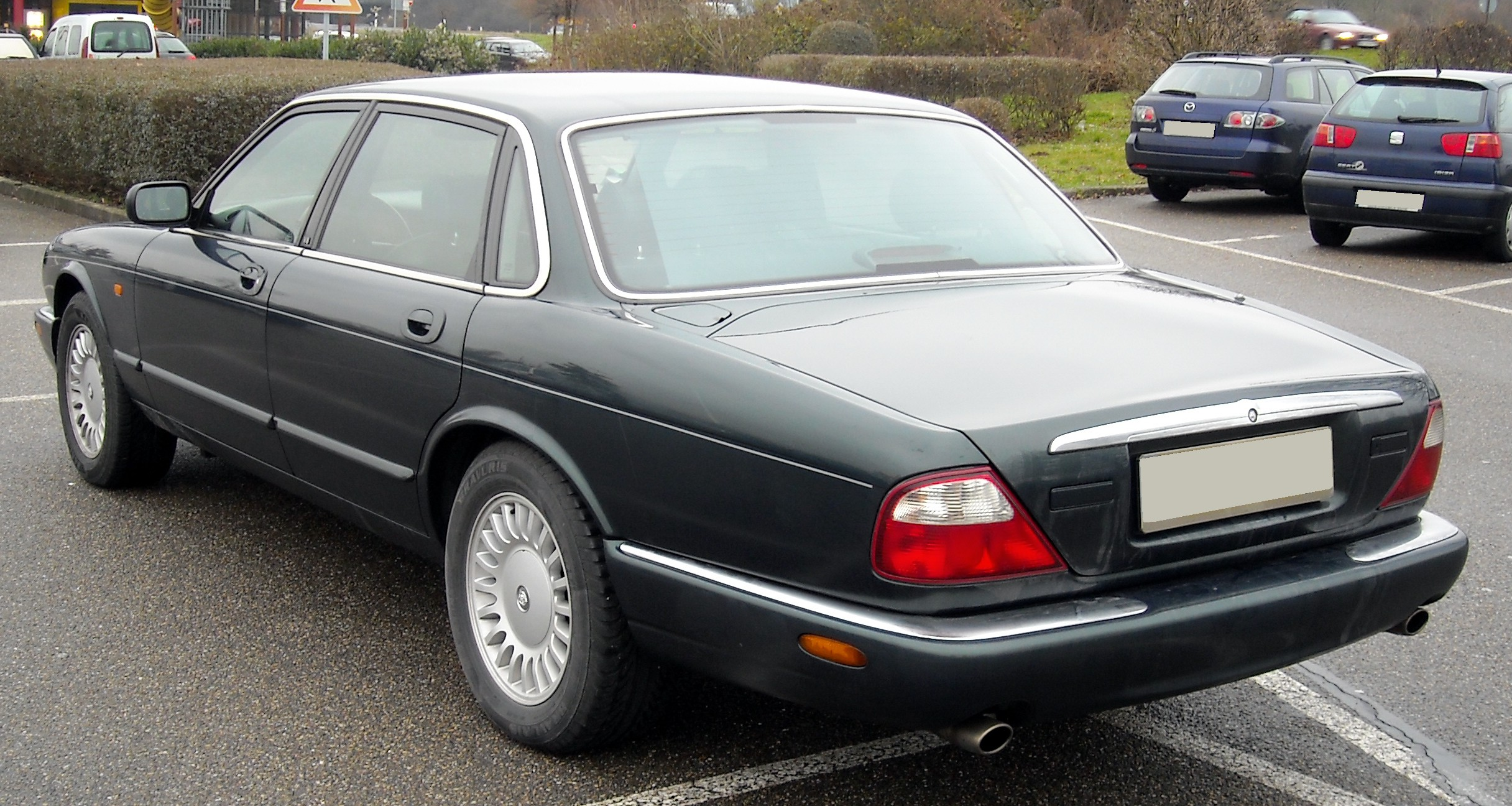
Rear view of the Jaguar XJ

The X308 kept much of the same exterior styling as its predecessor, the Jaguar XJ (X300), carrying its rounded four-headlamp bonnet, low roofline, sloping tail, and wrap-around rear light clusters. From the front, the two generations can be differentiated by the shape of the indicator lenses (rectangular on the X300, oval on the X308), and also by the shape of the fog lamps and lower valance air intake, both of which are more rounded on the X308.

The front and rear bumpers were both changed along with the taillights which had red/clear lenses rather than red/grey lenses. The grille surround and badging was slightly changed. The headlight fixtures also included forward parking lights housed with the brights, new to X308.

== Interior ==
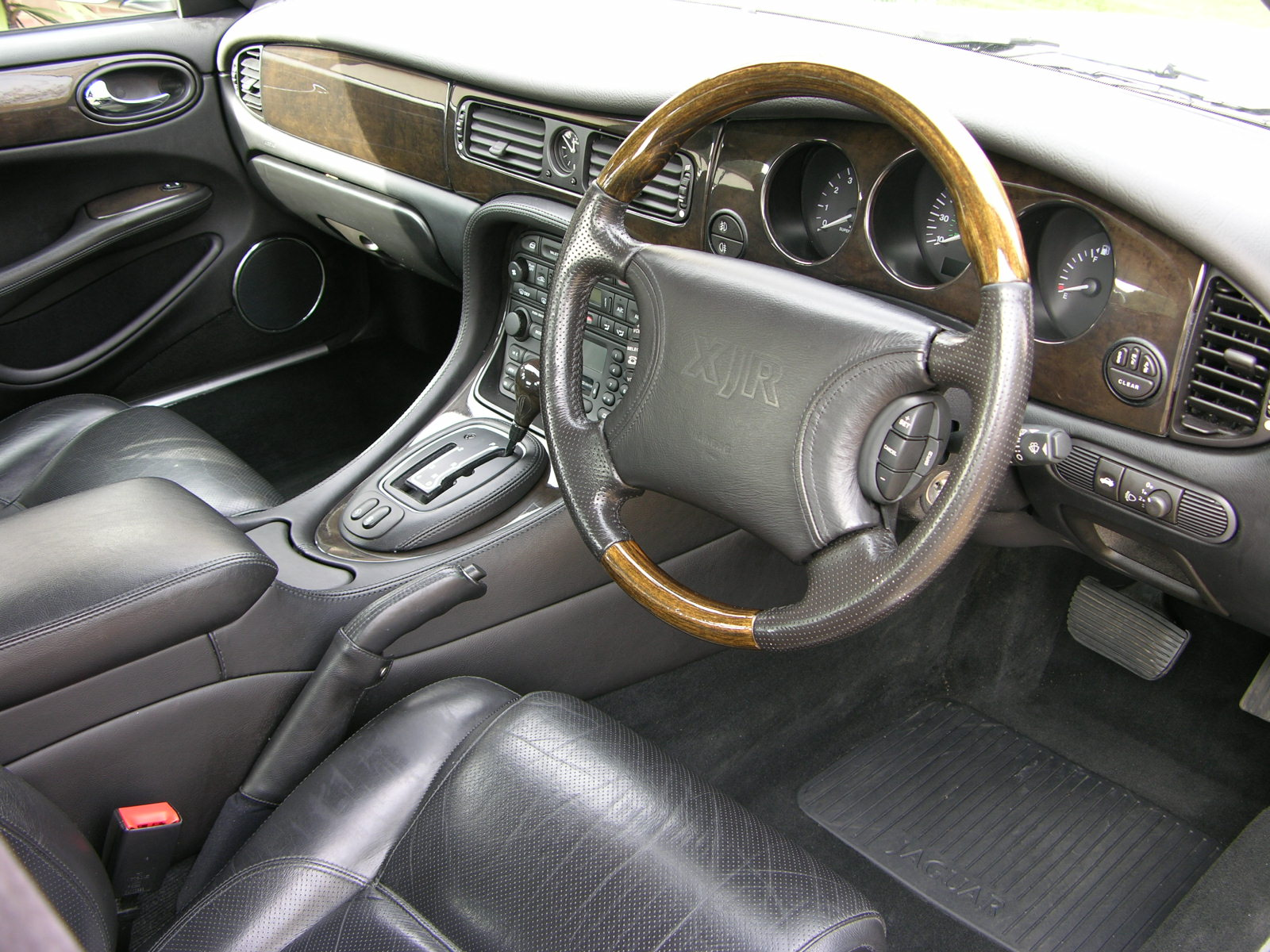
Interior of the XJR

The biggest change to the interior on the X308 was to the dashboard, which had remained essentially the same since the original XJ40 with only detail changes over the years. The rectangular instrument binnacle gave way to three deeply recessed dials similar in style to the recently introduced Jaguar XK8. The new fascia also allowed for the restoration of a proper glove compartment, which had been lost when the original XJ40 dash had been retrofitted with a passenger side airbag. Door trim and the design of the centre console were also slightly revised.

== Mechanicals ==
After the XJ40, Jaguar's intention was to launch a brand new saloon with a new V8 engine. Ford halted development of the saloon, termed XJ90, and proposed to install its new engine and front and rear ends onto the centre section of the XJ40 model; however, the V8 was not ready, the X300 became one of Jaguar's most successful models, and the X308 went on to become Jaguar's first V8-powered saloon car.

Having discontinued production of both the AJ16 inline-six and V12 engines, Jaguar offered only its newly designed V8 engine, which was named the AJ-V8. It was available in either 3.2 L or 4.0 L form; certain markets, such as the United States, only received cars powered by the 4.0 L version. The 4.0 L version was also supercharged in certain models. No manual gearbox or limited slip differential option were available for any models. Computer-controlled active suspension was available as a feature named Computer Active Technology Suspension (CATS).

Engine	Power	Torque	Transmission
3.2 L	240 hp (179 kW; 243 PS)	233 lb⋅ft (316 N⋅m)	ZF 5HP24
4.0 L	290 hp (216 kW; 294 PS)	290 lb⋅ft (393 N⋅m)	ZF 5HP24
4.0 L supercharged	370 hp (276 kW; 375 PS)	387 lb⋅ft (525 N⋅m)	Mercedes-Benz 5G-Tronic W5A580

== Models ==
Instead of the Daimler marque being used in certain markets, the equivalent Vanden Plas models were sold under the Jaguar name.

=== XJ8 ===
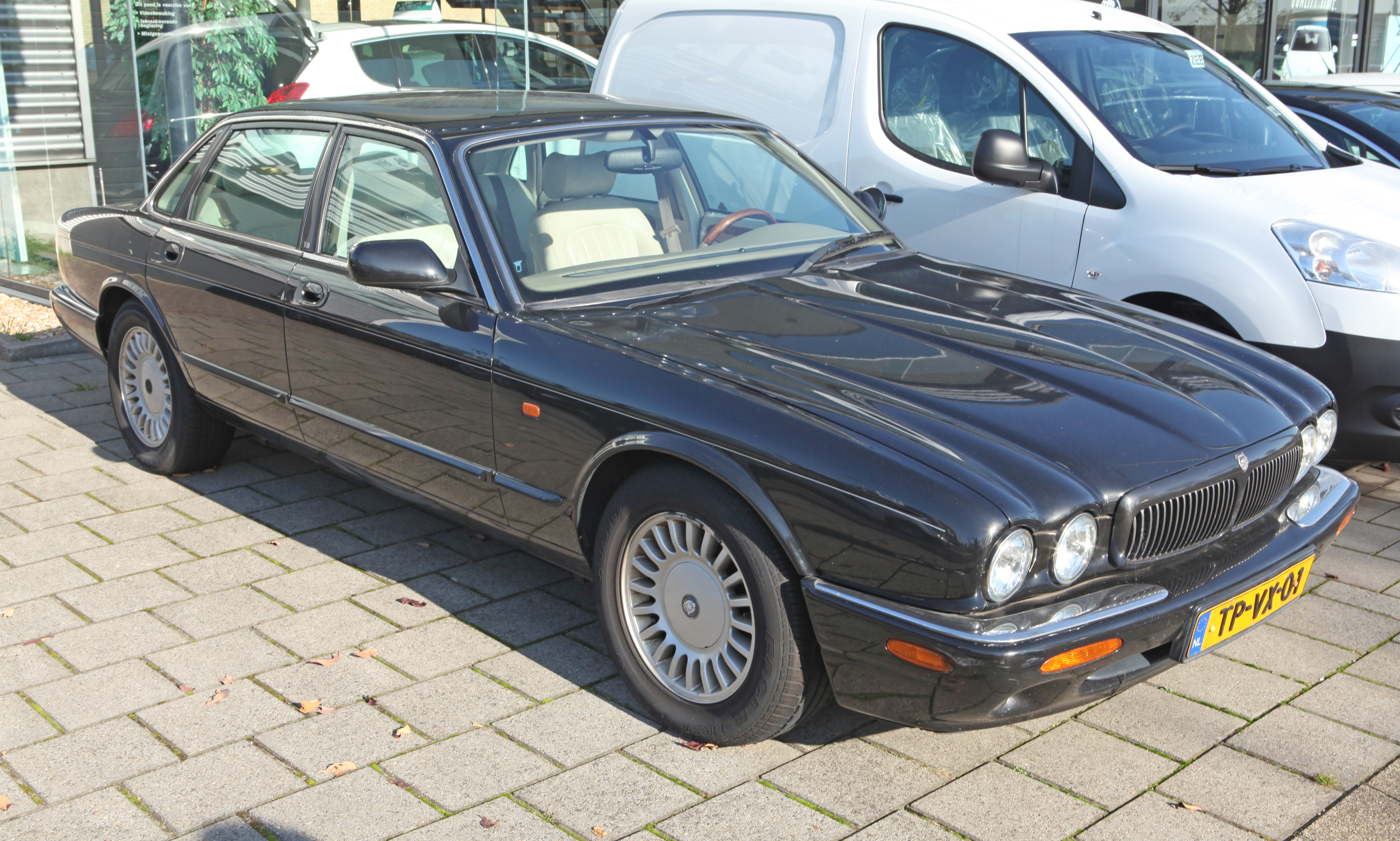
1998 Jaguar XJ8 Executive

The base XJ8 came standard with more equipment than had been fitted to entry-level XJs in the past, including leather upholstery, alloy wheels, and air conditioning. The door mirrors and door handles are body-coloured. The radiator grille, windscreen and rear window surrounds, boot lid plinth, and rain gutters were chromed, while the window frames remained matte black. Interior wood trim is walnut. Rear badging reads XJ8. For the home market in September 2000, Jaguar began badging the XJ8 model as XJ Executive, and fitted as standard rain-sensing wipers, a CD player, cruise control, and rear parking sensors.

=== Sport ===
The Sport model was equipped only with the 3.2 L normally aspirated engine, except Australia and the United States that had the optional 4.0 L normally aspirated V8 available. It offered stiffer suspension, sportier seating and interior colour combinations, and wider, larger wheels than the XJ8. The windscreen and rear window surrounds were painted matte black, as were the rain gutters and window frames for European markets; for the United States market, it retains chrome surrounds. The radiator grille has metallic grey vertical slats. Rather than a chrome radiator grille surround, the Sport uses a body-coloured surround. Rear badging reads XJ Sport. The non-Sport XJ8 3.2 was badged as the XJ Executive.

=== Sovereign ===
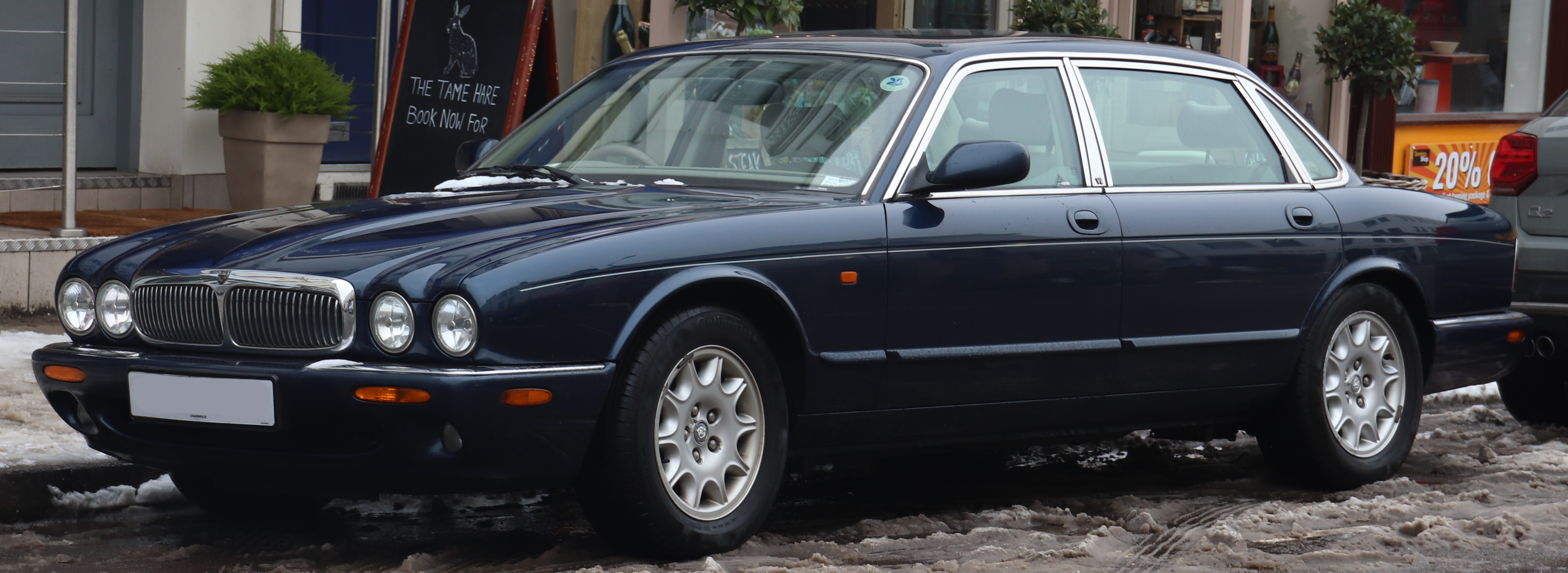
A 1998 Jaguar Sovereign V8 Automatic 4.0

The Sovereign represented the highest luxury specification for Jaguar models, sitting next to the XJR, which provides the ultimate performance. Sovereigns featured more elaborate/expensive wood veneer, commonly highly figured burr walnut; with window control/ashtray trim panels also done in wood veneer as opposed to plastic in other models. The leather is also of a higher quality and often features contrasting piping, with seats being of the traditional fluted style. The suspension setup was biased towards touring and the wheels were normally 16 or 17 inches to provide high-profile tyres for additional ride quality. CATS adaptive suspension was also offered as a rare option. Externally, a Sovereign can be distinguished by the complete use of highly polished steel/chrome work around windows and rear light clusters, as well as polished radiator grille and boot garnish. The cars are simply badged as Sovereign with no mention of XJ. Jaguar also released a long wheelbase version of the Sovereign in 1998. The difference being that the car is around 5 inches longer, with the rear doors being noticeably longer than the front; there is also correspondingly taller rear roof profile to provide additional headroom. For the 2000 model, it received auto wipers, heated screen, CD changer, and 7×16 Lunar wheels.

=== XJR ===
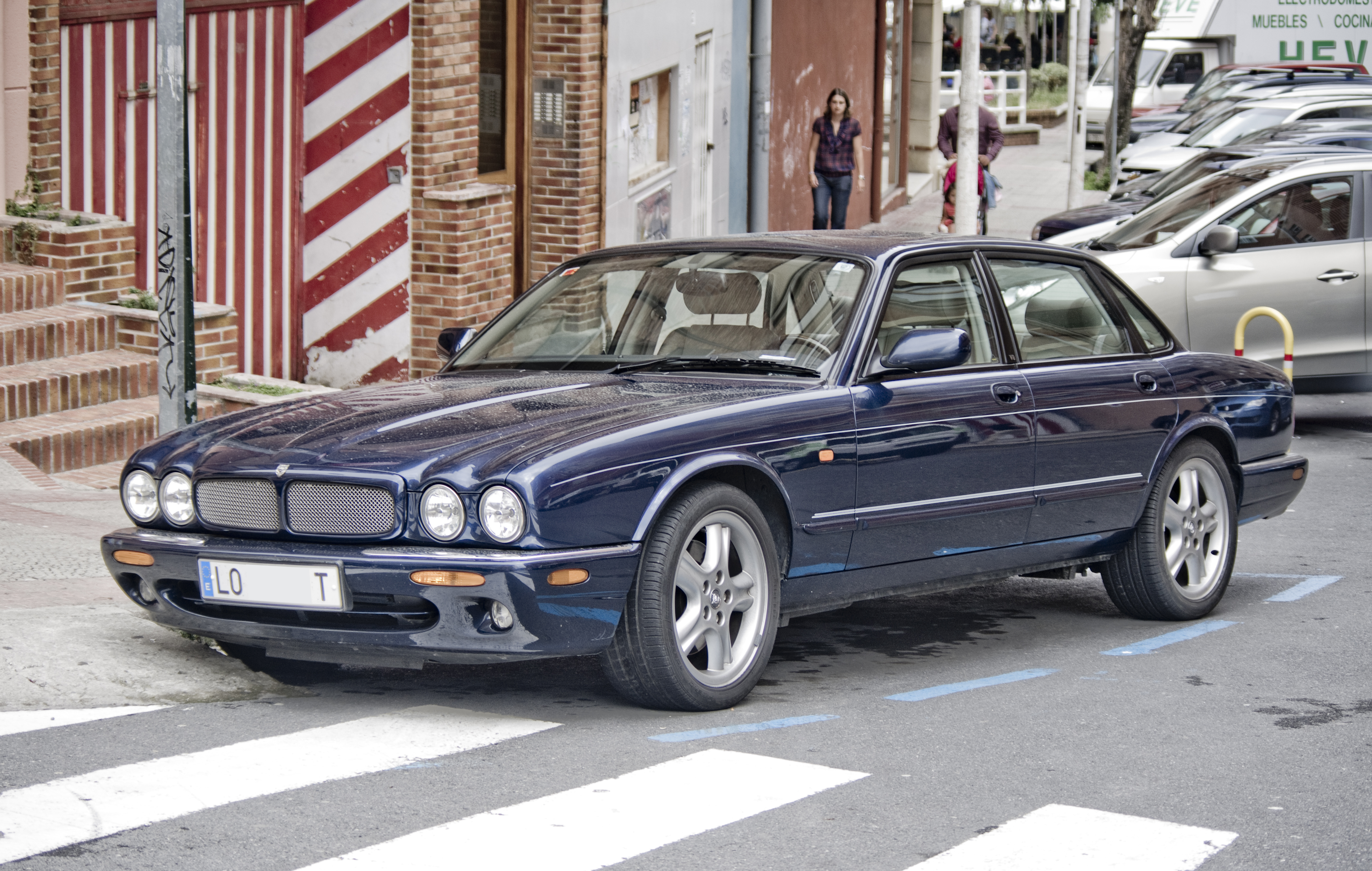
A 1999 Jaguar XJR

The XJR is powered by the supercharged version of the 4.0 L V8. It is also equipped with sport suspension, wider wheels and tyres, and matte-black exterior window trim, except in the United States market, where the XJR was given chrome window frames and rain gutters. Like the Sport model, the XJR has a body-coloured radiator grille surround; it is with a stainless-steel mesh insert rather than the normal vanes. Other exterior touches include the XJR rear badging and larger exhaust outlets.

Available on late XJR models was an R1 performance option. This included 18 inch BBS wheels, larger Brembo brakes with cross-drilled rotors, and re-tuned suspension. The XJR was capable of reaching 97 km/h (60 mph) from a standstill in 5.6 seconds, with an electronically limited top speed of 249 km/h (155 mph). In 2001, to commemorate the 100th anniversary of Sir William Lyons' birth, Jaguar produced five hundred examples of a special-edition model named the XJR 100. Only available in the Anthracite exterior colour with charcoal leather upholstery, the interior is trimmed with contrasting red stitching and birdseye maple. It is fitted with a leather-covered sports steering wheel and MOMO shift knob. The XJR 100 uses the Brembo brakes otherwise found on the R1-equipped XJR and 19-inch Montreal-style wheels manufactured by BBS.

=== SE ===
Produced only in 2002, the SE (Special Equipment) model was fitted with more equipment than the original base model, and was offered at a competitive price. The rear badging read SE, and the cars were fitted with reverse parking sensors as standard.

=== Daimler/Vanden Plas ===
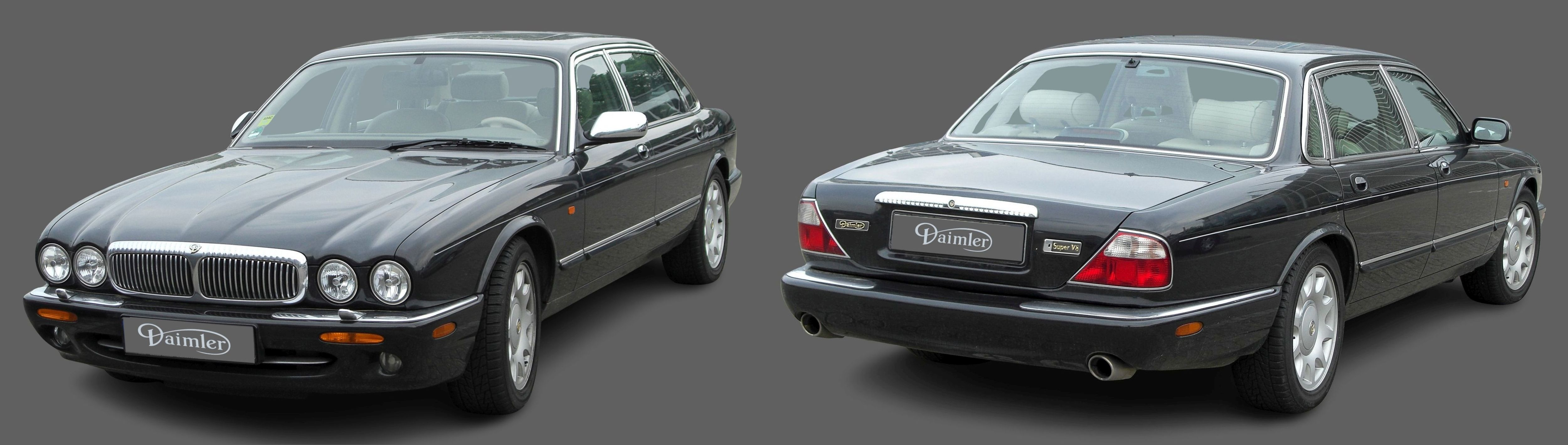
Daimler Super V8

The top-of-the-range Daimler marque, which was sold as the Vanden Plas model in certain markets like the United States, features softer suspension and all available luxury features. They are cosmetically differentiated by the traditional Daimler fluted radiator grille surround and fluted boot-lid plinth. The Daimler and Vanden Plas cars were also available with the supercharged engine otherwise found only in the XJR. This model was named the Daimler Super V8. In the United States market, this combination was available only as a special order through 2001, with these cars identifiable by their Vanden Plas Supercharged rear badging. For the United States 2002 and 2003 model years, the equivalent Super V8 model was then offered. These supercharged long-wheelbase variants were also fitted with Jaguar's proprietary CATS adaptive suspension. The Sports setup from the XJR application is replaced by a Touring setup, exclusive to supercharged Daimler and Vanden Plas variants. It is softer and more compliant than the XJR's CATS system.

== Special uses ==
The car was used by Tony Blair as his prime ministerial car. Dating back to the Jaguar XJ (Series III), previous and successive versions of the XJ were used by other British prime ministers, including Margaret Thatcher, John Major, Gordon Brown, David Cameron, Theresa May, and Boris Johnson. This changed under Johnson when the Range Rover Abio Sentinel was first used as the new prime ministerial car in 2019. The XJ was also used in the show Better Call Saul by the character Howard Hamlin.

== Production numbers ==
Model	Production
XJ8 3.2	20,235 (including Executive and SE)
XJ8 3.2 (LWB)	771
XJ8 3.2 Sovereign	2,095
XJ8 3.2 Sovereign (LWB)	385
Sport	1,108
XJ8 3.2 Executive	
XJ8 3.2 SE	
XJ8 4.0	8,369
XJ8 4.0 (LWB)	148
XJ8 4.0 Sovereign	36,635 (including SE)
XJ8 4.0 Sovereign (LWB)	11,566
XJ8 4.0 SE	
XJR	15,203
XJR 100	500
4.0 Vanden Plas (SWB)	1
4.0 Vanden Plas (LWB)	21,080
4.0 Vanden Plas Supercharged	788
Daimler Eight (SWB)	164
Daimler Eight (LWB)	2,119
Daimler Super V8 (SWB)	76
Daimler Super V8 (LWB)	2,387
Total	126,260

== Reception ==
Motor Trend described the X308 as "a masterful blend of British luxury and American muscle". He added that "this car makes you feel elegant and gets sweeter by the mile", and called it a "musclecar in a tuxedo". Brian Cooley, an editor of Roadshow by CBS, called the X308 his "favorite modern car". In 2018, Motorious said that the X308 provides the most luxurious ride of any car ever produced due to its status as the "last steel-bodied XJ and the first to feature a modern V8 drivetrain, the perfect concoction of classic and contemporary Jaguars". He added "this is a car that fits anywhere it goes, be that the supermarket car park, a country hotel or even outside the Casino de Monte-Carlo." Jeremy Clarkson of Top Gear remarked that the X308 is "faster, in the real world, than a Ferrari F355 ... fastest saloon I've ever seen", and the epitome of luxury, beauty, and performance. In a 2022 retrospective, Classic Worlds wrote: "It might be the model people shy away from, but the Jaguar X308 XJ is a performance and luxury bargain today – and a sure fire classic investment."
