= Jaguar XJ (XJ40) =

Saloon car (1986–1994)

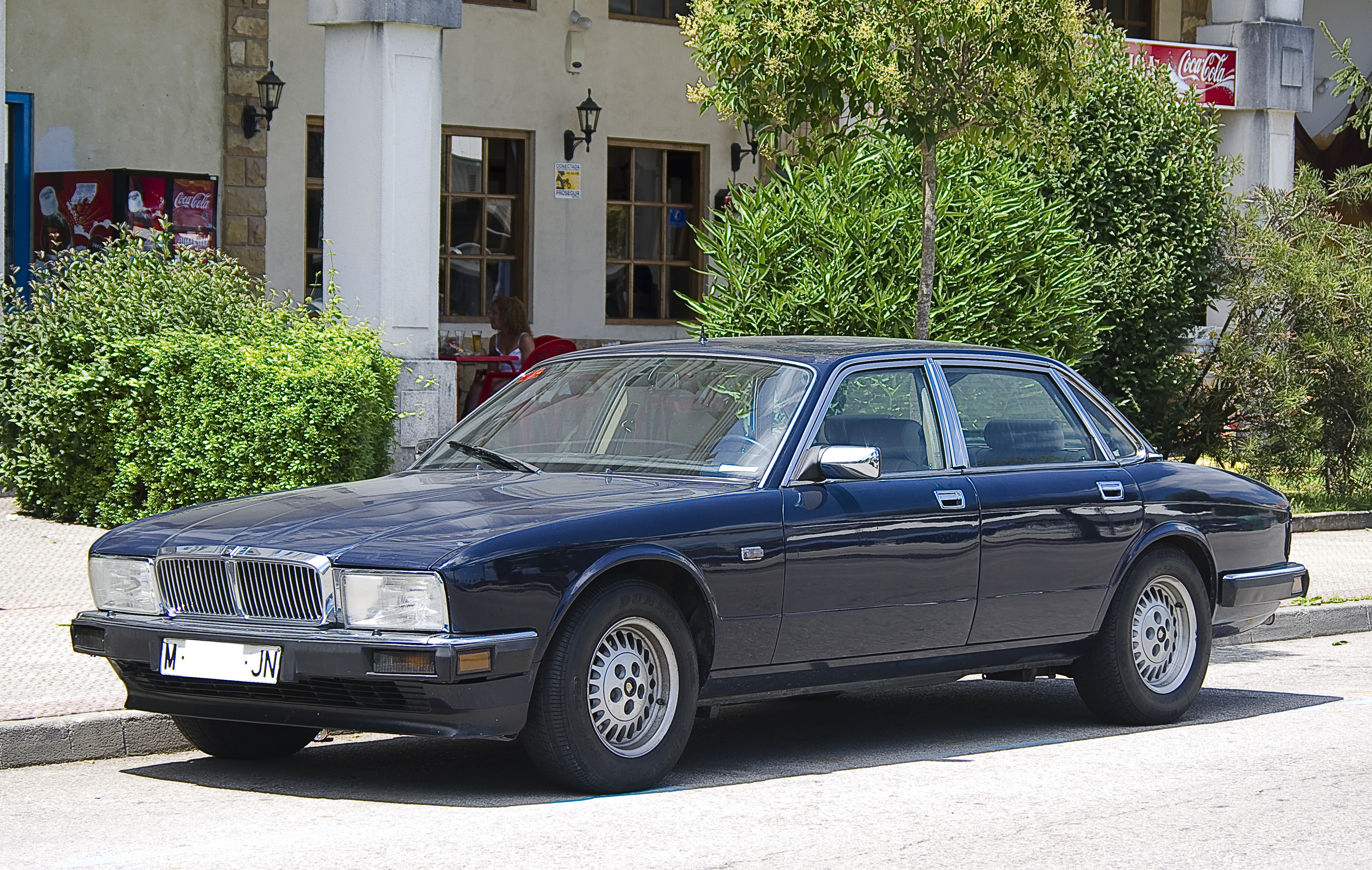
- A 1989 Jaguar XJ Sovereign

Overview
- Manufacturer: Jaguar Cars
- Model code: XJ40; XJ81 (XJ12 and Daimler Double Six)
- Also called: Jaguar Sovereign; Daimler
- Production: October 1986 – October 1994
- Assembly: United Kingdom: Coventry, England
- Designer: George Thomson and Roger Zrimec under Doug Thorpe (1978)

Body and chassis
- Class: Full-size luxury car (F)
- Body style: 4-door saloon
- Layout: Front-engine, rear-wheel-drive

Powertrain
- Engine: 2.9 L AJ6 I6; 3.2 L AJ6 I6; 3.6 L AJ6 I6; 4.0 L AJ6 I6; 6.0 L Jaguar V12
- Transmission: 4-speed ZF 4HP22 automatic; 4-speed ZF 4HP24 automatic; 4-speed GM 4L80-E automatic; 5-speed Getrag 265 / 290 manual

Dimensions
- Wheelbase: 2,870 mm (113 in); Majestic: 2,997 mm (118 in)
- Length: 4,989 mm (196.4 in); Majestic: 5,116 mm (201.4 in)
- Width: 1,801 mm (70.9 in)
- Height: 1,378 mm (54.25 in)
- Kerb weight: 1,720–1,770 kg (3,792–3,902 lb)

Chronology
- Predecessor: Jaguar XJ (Series III)
- Successor: Jaguar XJ (X300)

The Jaguar XJ (XJ40) is a full-size luxury saloon manufactured by Jaguar Cars between 1986 and 1994. It was officially unveiled on 8 October 1986 as an all-new, second generation of the XJ to replace the Series III, although the two model ranges were sold concurrently until the Series III was discontinued in 1992. The XJ40 used the Jaguar independent rear suspension arrangement, and featured a number of technological enhancements, such as electronic instrument cluster. It was the last car to be developed independently by Jaguar (prior to its takeover by Ford), and also the last to have been developed largely within the lifetime of the company's founder Sir William Lyons, who died shortly before its release.

The 1993 XJ6 earned the title of "Safest Car in Britain" as the result of a government survey. The original 1986 car gave way to the heavily revised Jaguar XJ (X300) in 1994, followed by the Jaguar XJ (X308) in 1997. The XJ40 and its later derivatives is to date the second longest running XJ platform, with a total production run of 17 years. After the XJ40, Jaguar's intention was to launch a brand new saloon with a new V8 engine. Ford halted development of the saloon, termed XJ90, and proposed to install its new engine and front and rear ends onto the centre section of the XJ40 model; however, the V8 was not ready.

== Development ==
Throughout the 1970s, Jaguar had been developing Project XJ40, which was an all-new model intended to replace the original XJ6. Scale models were being built as early as 1972. Due to the 1973 oil crisis and problems at parent company British Leyland, the car was continually delayed. Proposals from both Jaguar's in-house designers and Pininfarina were received. Eventually, it was decided an internal design would be carried through to production.

In February 1981, the British Leyland board approved £80 million to produce the new car. Launch was originally scheduled for 1984. Following Jaguar's de-merger from BL and privatization that same year, the company's CEO John Egan took advantage of the resurgence in sales of the existing Series III XJ6, particularly in the lucrative North American market, to delay the XJ40's launch a further two years to allow for more development time.

The XJ40 was at the time the most extensively tested vehicle the company had ever developed. Designs for the XJ40 pioneered significant improvements to how Jaguar cars were designed, built, and assembled. Among these improvements was a 25% reduction in the number of bodywork panels required per car (e.g. three pressings needed for a Series 3 door compared with one for a XJ40 door), resulting in not only a more efficient assembly process but also a weight saving and a stiffer structure. Despite this, early production XJ40s still suffered from reliability problems, particularly with the electrical systems and build quality. This damaged its reputation, and continued Jaguar's poor reputation for quality, despite the extensive testing of the car and the engineering efforts to improve quality. The protracted development time meant the car dated much quicker than its rivals, and it was quickly superseded technologically by the E32 BMW 7-Series (1986), the Lexus LS400 (1989), and the W140 Mercedes-Benz S-Class (1991). Following the takeover by the Ford Motor Company in 1990, the XJ40 was replaced by the X300. While it was based on the XJ40 platform, the X300 was highly revised in almost all areas.

Retired Jaguar founder Sir William Lyons had acted in a consultative role during the XJ40 project's early phase, and was shown the final prototype shortly before his death in 1985, and was said to be approving of the car - thus the XJ40 is widely believed to be the final Jaguar to have had Lyons' involvement.

== Mechanicals ==
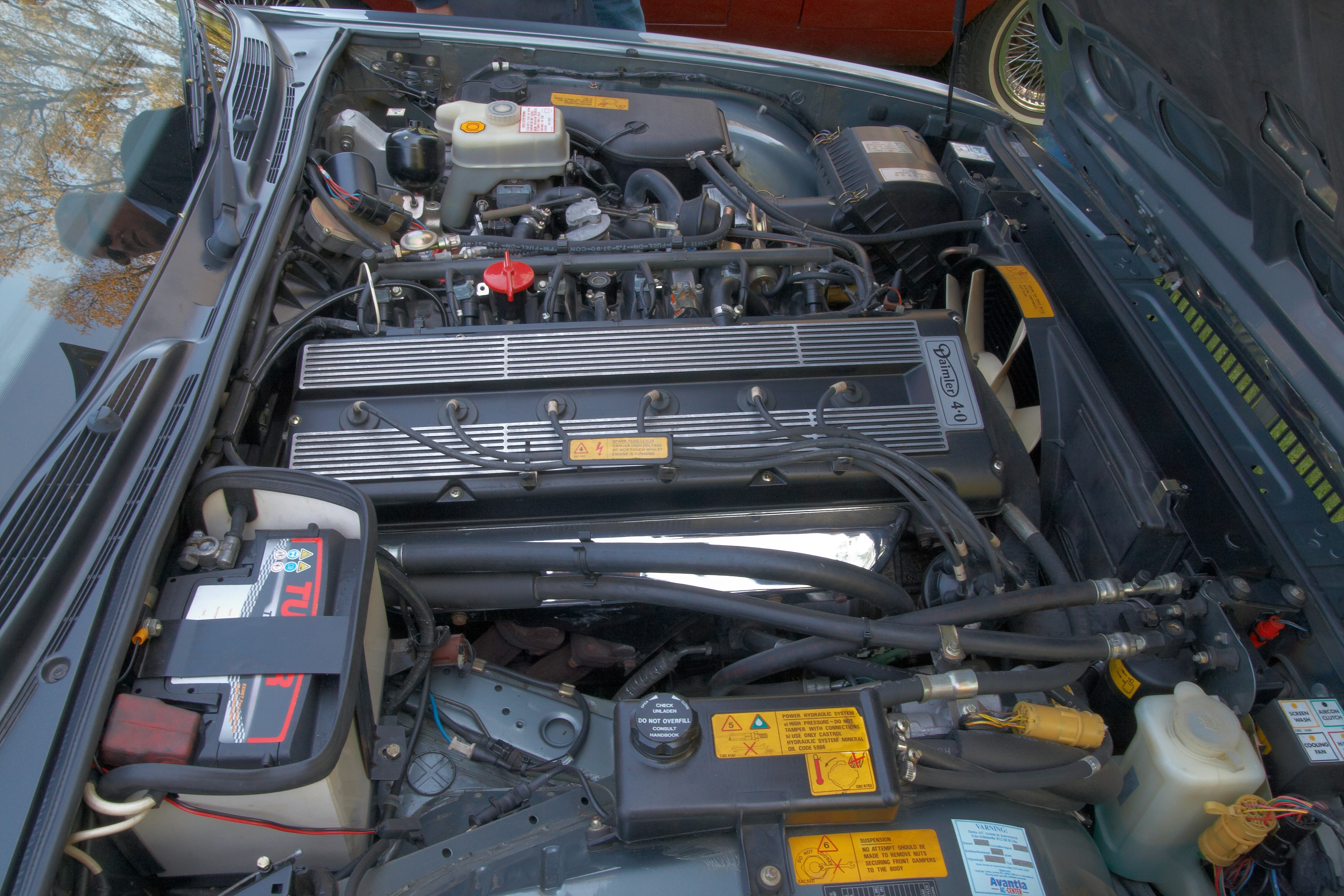
The AJ6 4.0 L engine in a 1990 Daimler

Initially, only two engines were offered across the XJ40 models: a 2.9 L and a 3.6 L version of the Jaguar AJ6 inline-six engine. In 1990, the 3.6 L was replaced by a 4.0 L model, and in 1991 the 2.9 L was replaced by a 3.2 L model. During the development of the XJ40, British Leyland had considered providing the Rover V8 engine for the car, which would have eliminated the need for future Jaguar engine production. The XJ40 bodyshell was allegedly engineered to prevent fitting V-configuration engines, in particular the Rover V8, which British Leyland management had desired; this delayed the introduction of the V12-powered XJ12 until 1993 as the front structure of the XJ40 had to be extensively redesigned. As a consequence, the preceding Series III XJ was kept in production in V12 form to cater for this market need until 1992.

The automatic gearbox used in the 2.9 L, 3.2 L, and 3.6 L six-cylinder cars was the four-speed ZF 4HP22. On the 4.0 L, the four-speed ZF 4HP24 was used. A stronger automatic gearbox was required for the V12 engine-equipped cars, and the four-speed GM 4L80-E was selected. The manual gearbox fitted to early cars was the five-speed Getrag 265, while later cars received the Getrag 290. The automatic transmission selector was redesigned to allow the manual selection of forward gears without accidentally selecting neutral or reverse. This new feature was dubbed the J-Gate and remained a staple of all Jaguar models up until the 2008 Jaguar XF, when shift by wire technology rendered it redundant; all subsequent Jaguar models now use a rotary knob for transmission mode selection.

== Exterior ==
The curvaceous lines of the outgoing Series XJ were replaced by the more angular, geometric shape of the XJ40. For the first production run, all headlamps fitted were a set of two round lamps inside a chrome housing with painted bezels or a set of form-fitting composite rectangular headlamps with power-wash sprayers. The lower trim level had painted bezels without chrome. The latter were fitted to the higher trim levels: Sovereign and Daimler. The United States safety regulations allowed the form-fitting composite headlamps in 1983 for the model year 1984 onward. The lengthy lead time for American type approval did not give Jaguar the opportunity to change at the last minute to the popular composite rectangular headlamps in time for the launch in the United States. During the 1990 model year refresh, the United States-specified XJ40 received the composite rectangular headlamps for entire trim levels. The European headlamps have single reflector for low and high beams behind the flatter glass lens. The United States headlamps have two separate reflectors for low and high beams behind the slightly bulbous plastic lens. After the refresh the door handles were altered to a design with a slightly larger handle pull, as well as Tibbe 8 disc locks being fitted, unlike the Ford 6 disc type.

The bumper is a visually distinct black-rubber-covered bar that runs the full width of the car, and incorporates the sidelights and indicator lights. The bonnet is hinged at the front. Window frames are either chromed or black, depending on model. Rain gutters, door mirrors, and door handles are also finished in chrome. All XJ40s have a chrome surround for the windshield and a single wide-sweeping wiper. Early low-specification cars were fitted with metric-sized steel wheels and plastic wheelcovers. From 1991, the wheels were changed to imperial sizing.

== Interior ==
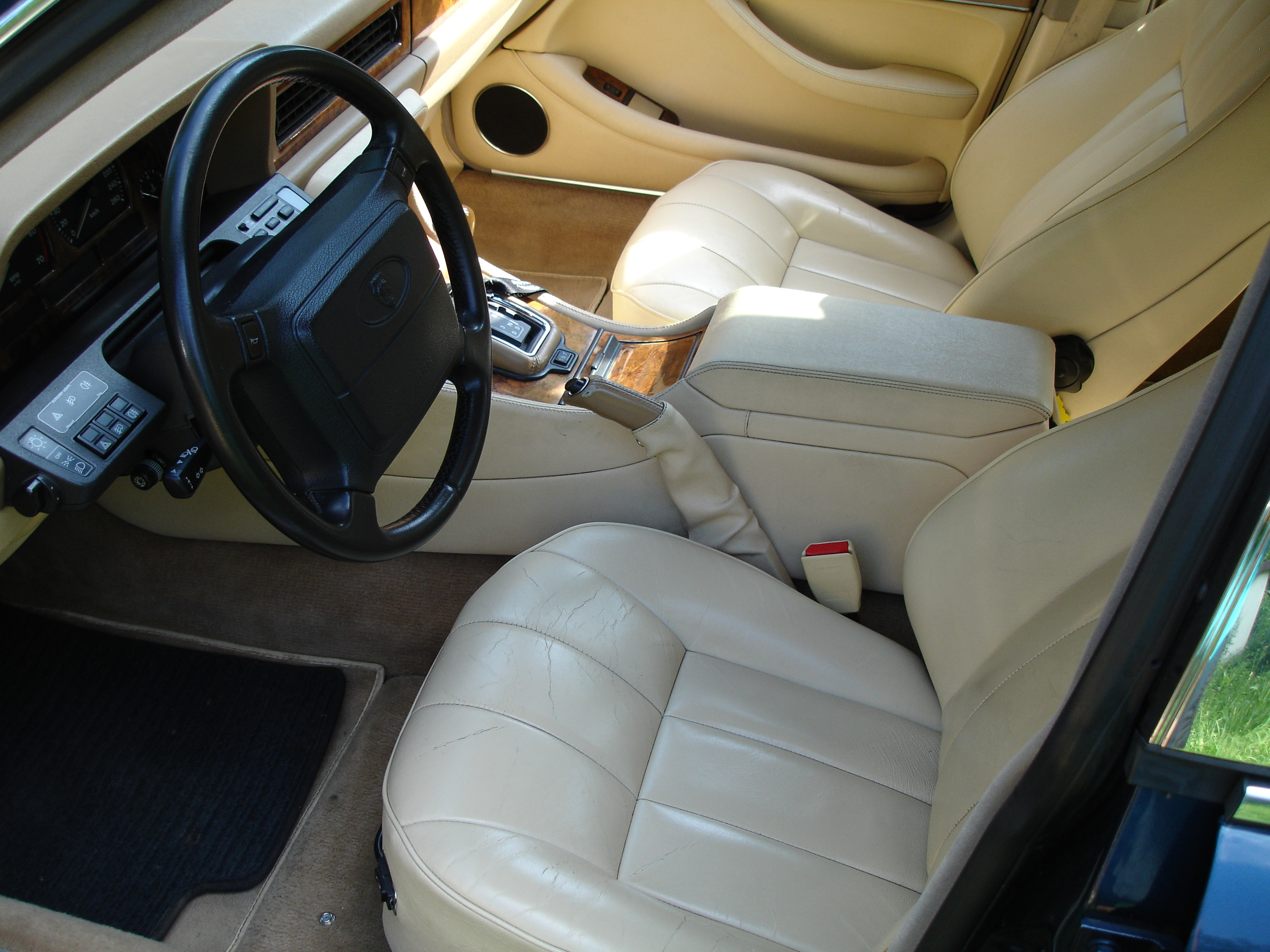
Interior of a XJ40 Gold

The interior of the XJ40 was trimmed with either walnut or rosewood, and either cloth or leather upholstery depending on model. Until 1990, cars were fitted with an instrument binnacle that used digital readouts for the ancillary gauges, but still featured an analogue tachometer and speedometer. Instrumentation included a vacuum fluorescent display named the Vehicle Condition Monitor (VCM), which contained a 32x32 dot-matrix screen capable of 34 functions. The VCM was able to alert the driver of bulb failure, brake pad wear, unlatched doors/boot, and low coolant level. The binnacle was notoriously unreliable - in particular gaining a reputation for erroneous bulb failure warnings - and from 1990 on the binnacle was redesigned to use analogue gauges.

Early cars used a two-spoke steering wheel that was later changed for a four-spoke airbag-equipped wheel. The glovebox was removed on later cars because of the space occupied when the passenger-side airbag was introduced. Starting in 1989, US models were fitted with automatic three point seatbelts due to new legislation. These were later replaced with traditional three point seatbelts from 1993 onwards.

== Models ==
=== XJ6 (1986–1994) ===
The base XJ6 of the model range was modestly equipped; extra-cost options included alloy wheels, anti-lock brakes, air conditioning, leather upholstery, and an automatic transmission. The exterior featured two pairs of circular headlamps and black powder-coated window frames.

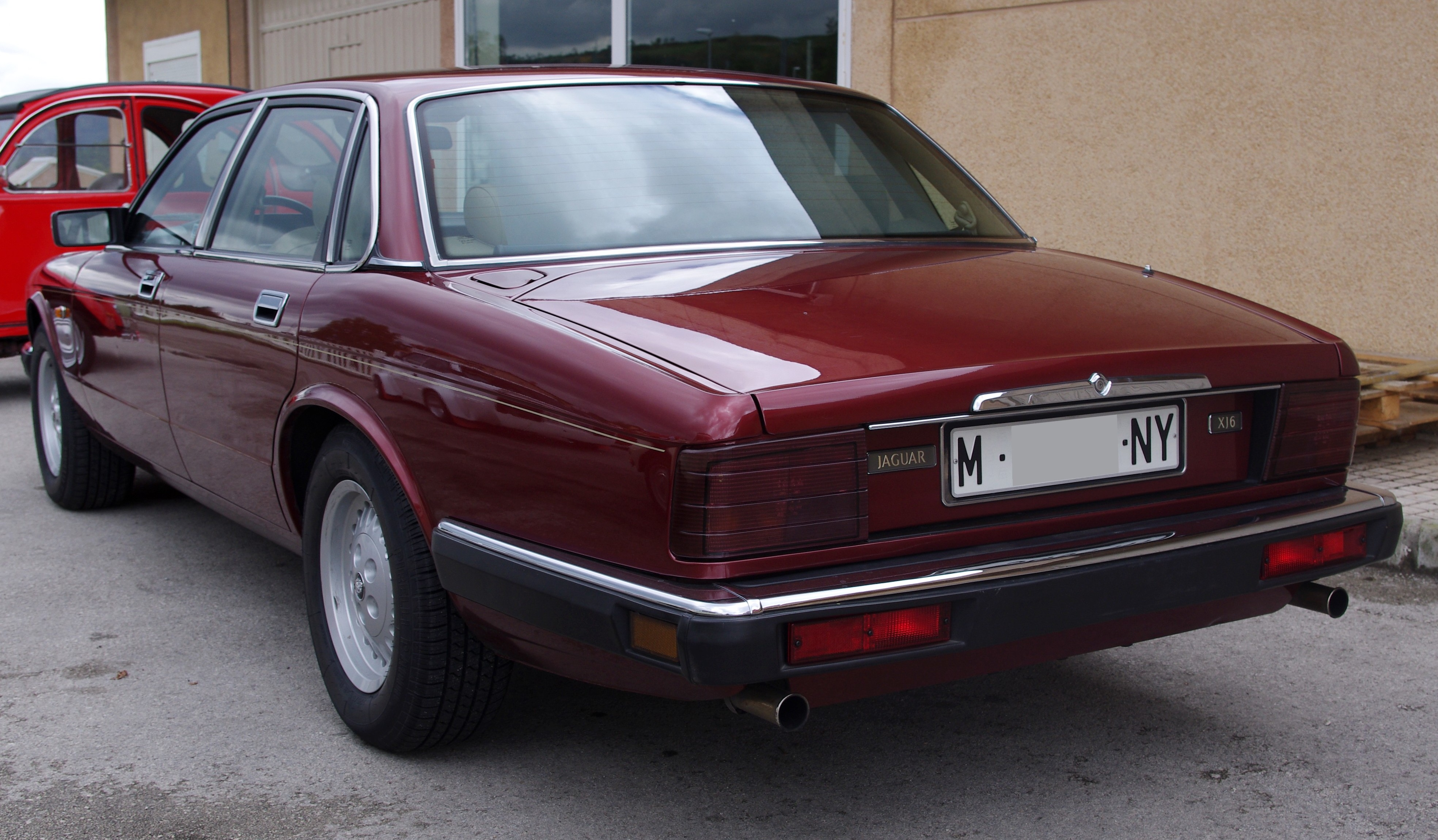
1992 Jaguar XJ6

=== Sovereign (1986–1994) ===
The Sovereign model came equipped with significantly more features than the base XJ6. Included was air conditioning, headlamp washers, a six-speaker sound system, rear self-levelling suspension (SLS), anti-lock braking system, and inlaid burl walnut wood trim (pre-MY1991). The headlamps fitted were the rectangular single units. The window frames were made from stainless steel.

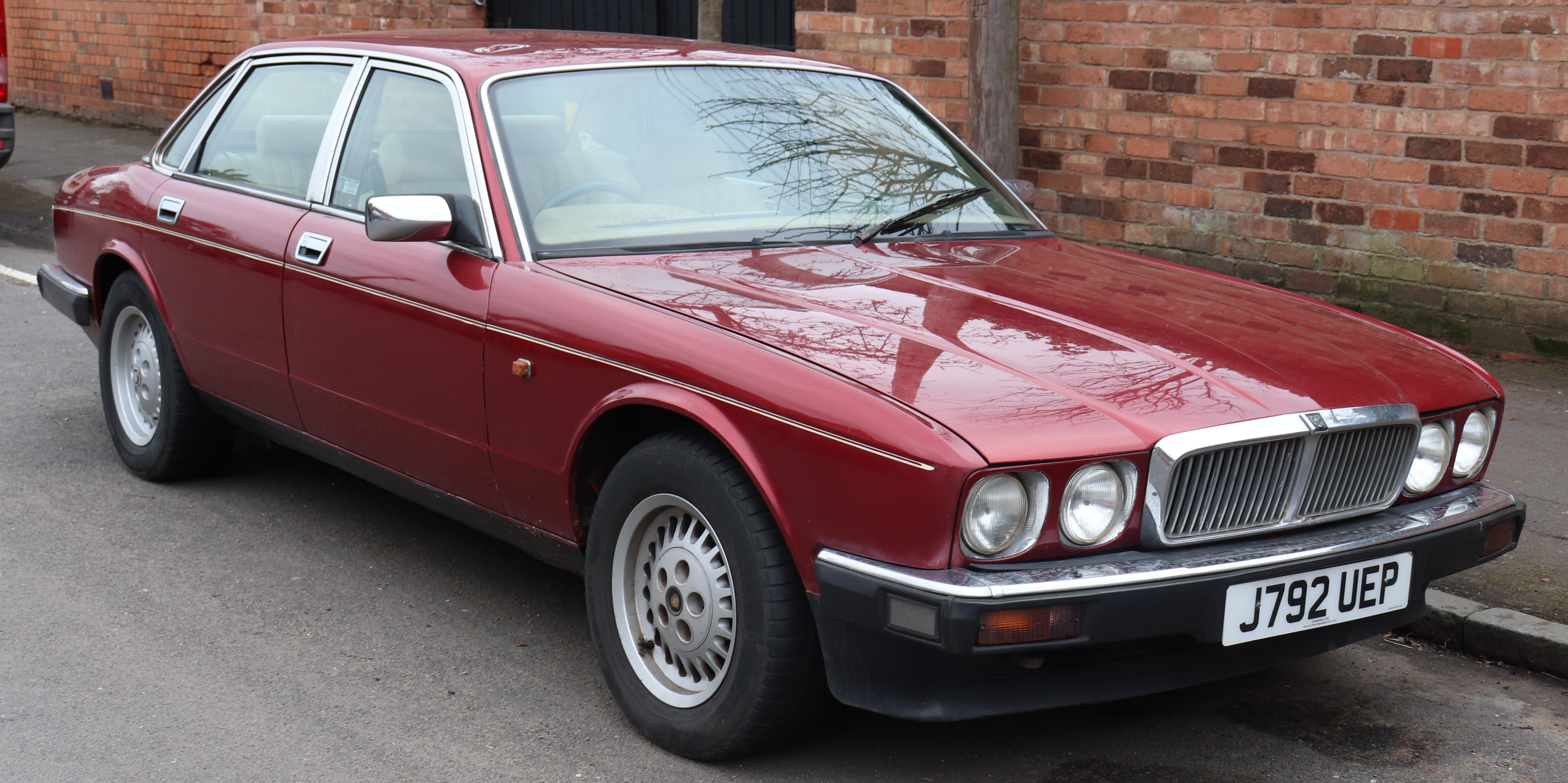
1992 Jaguar Sovereign with twin round headlights

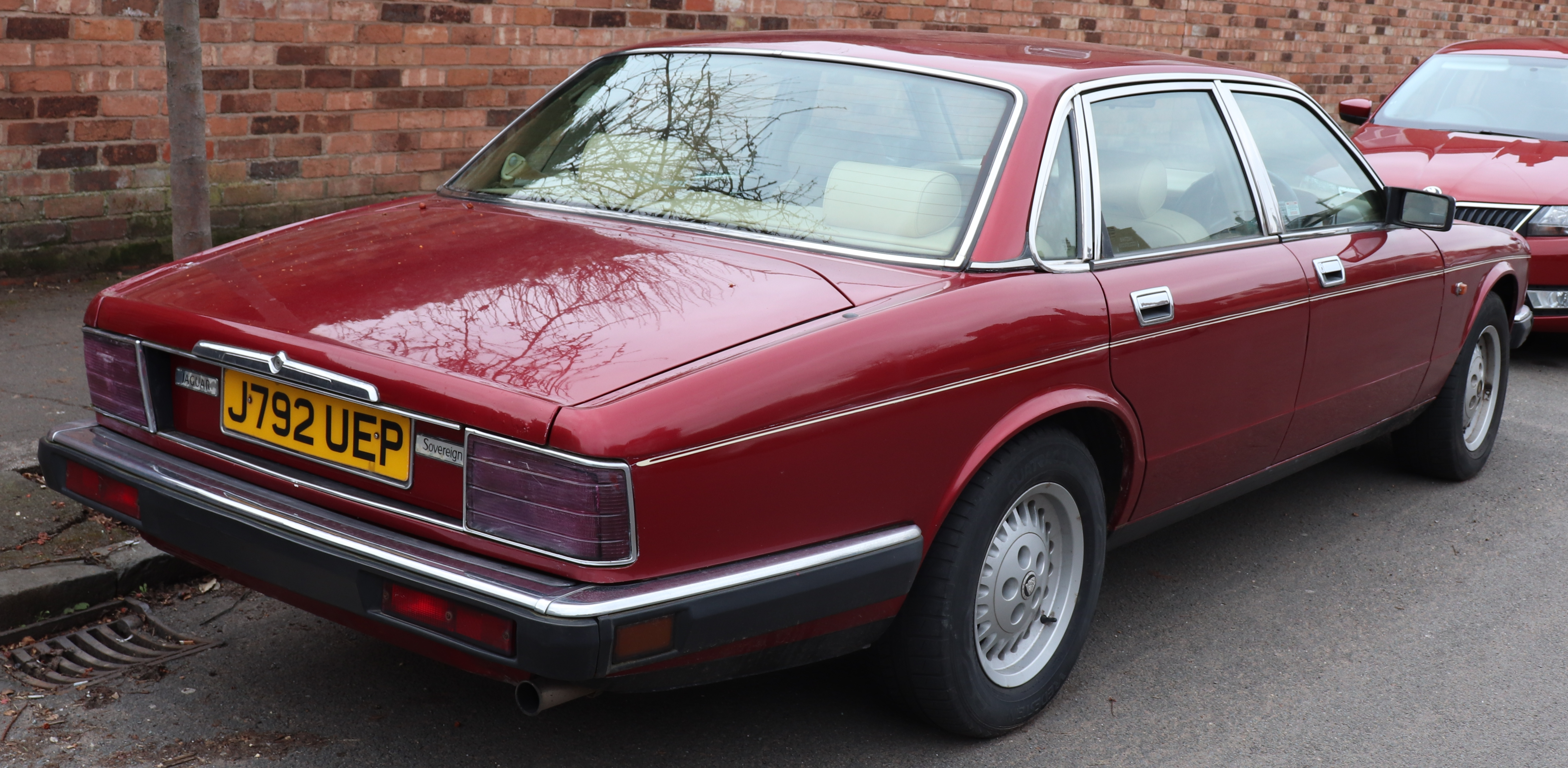
1992 Jaguar Sovereign

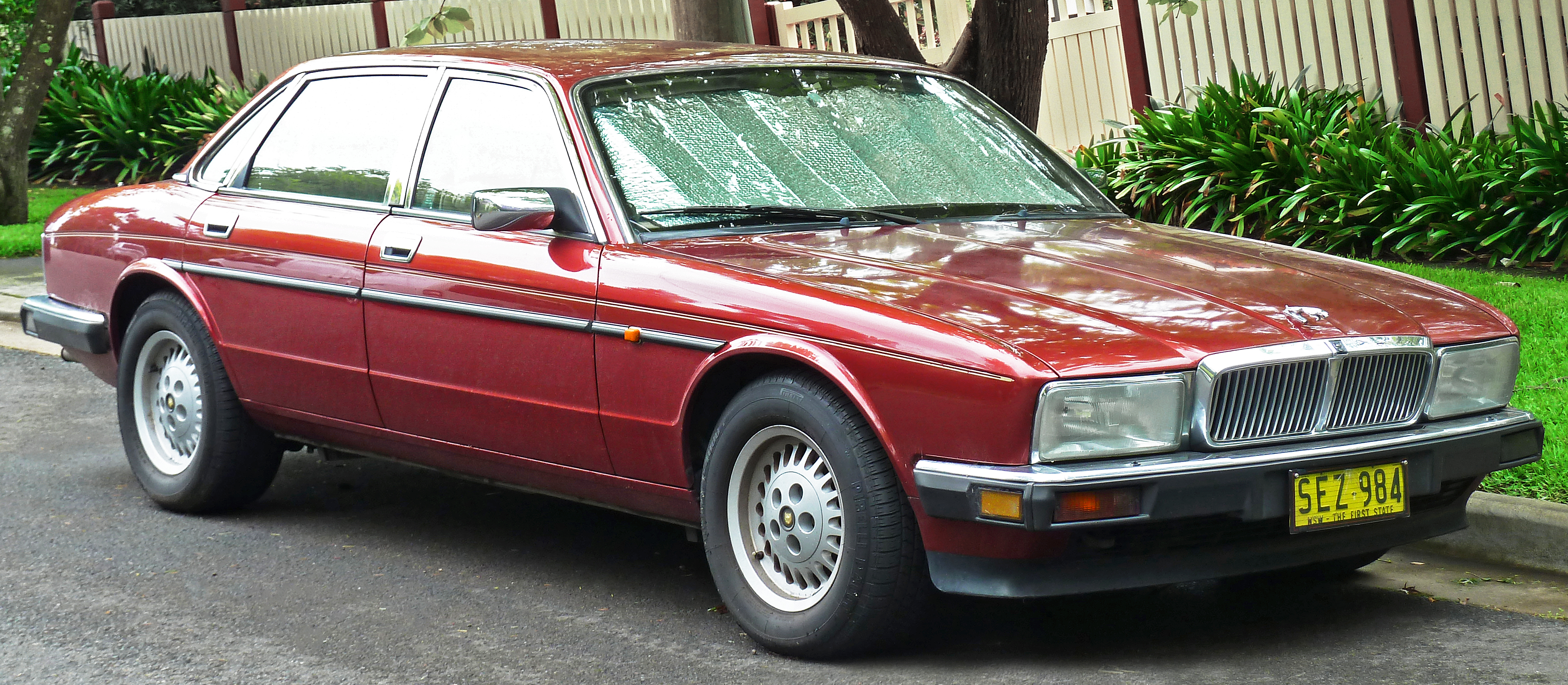
1991–1994 Jaguar Sovereign model with single rectangular headlights

=== Sport (1993–1994) ===
Late in the XJ40 run 3.2S and 4.0S in 1993–1994, Jaguar introduced the Sport model. It was available only with the six-cylinder engine and featured rosewood interior trim, as opposed to the walnut trim of other models. Both the door mirrors and radiator grille vanes were colour-keyed to the body, which was decorated with twin coachlines. Wider-profile tires were fitted, mounted on five-spoke alloy wheels.

=== Majestic (1989–1992 – SWB; 1993–1994 – LWB) ===
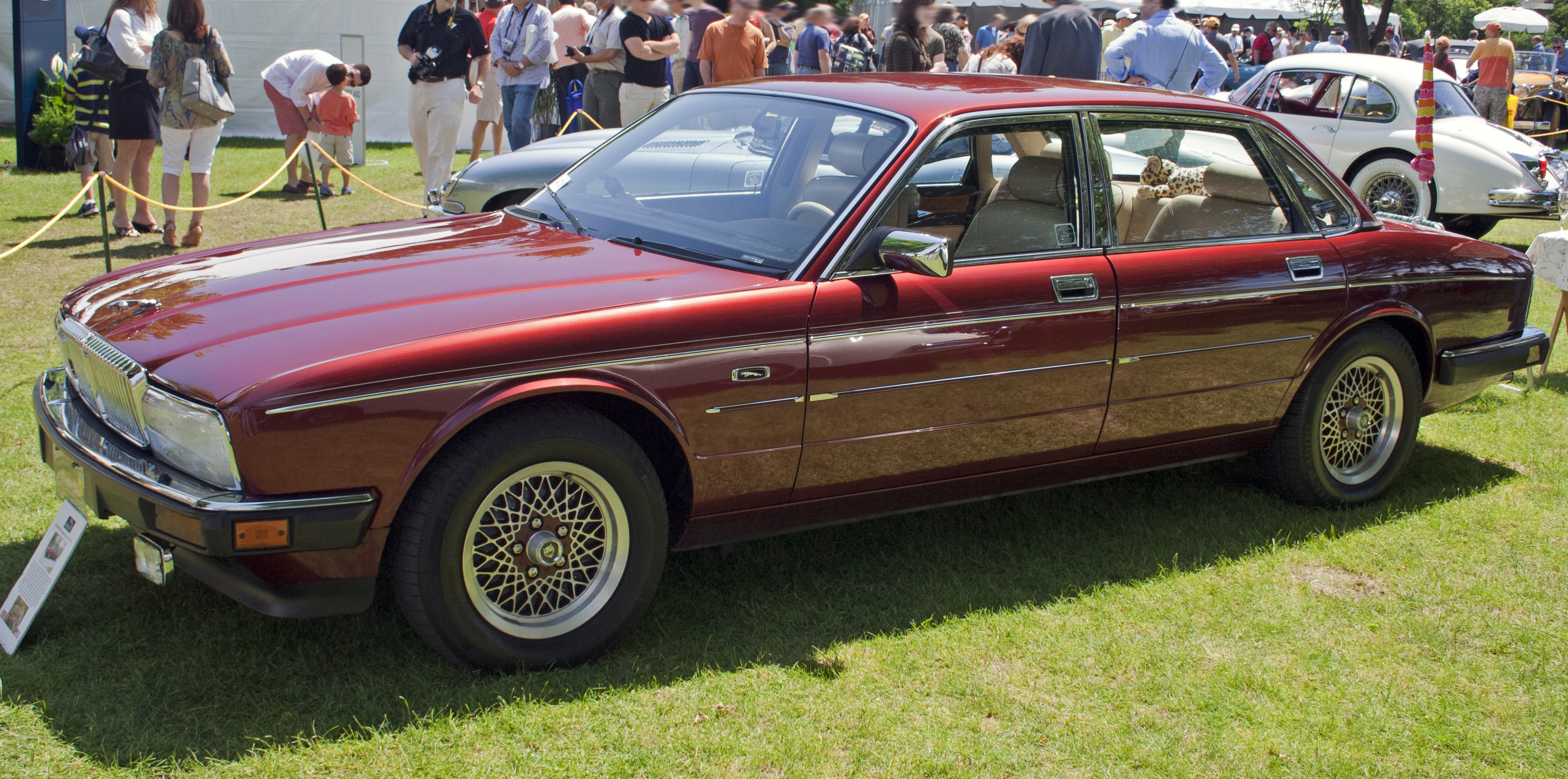
1990 United States-market Vanden Plas Majestic

A rare long-wheelbase model named the Majestic was produced in 1993 and 1994. These vehicles started life as a SWB body that was then taken away from the standard production line and stretched by Project Aerospace in Coventry, before being returned to Castle Bromwich plant for paint before being finally assembled on the production line at Browns Lane under the direction of Jaguar Special Vehicle Operations. This meant the Majestic carried a significant price premium over the standard models. It was offered to all markets except the United States and Canada. This car should not be confused with cars that were stretched into limousines through an after-market company.

There was a Short Wheel Base (SWB) version on the regular wheelbase for the United States market only from 1989 to 1992, called the Vanden Plas Majestic but badged as Majestic. These cars were mostly finished in Regency Red (with Red Lattice alloys), apart from the 1992 cars which were finished in Black Cherry (with Oyster Roulette alloys). A SWB USA Majestic can be identified by M as the fourth letter of its VIN, and the LWB rest of world Majestic's have an M as the seventh digit of the VIN.

=== Gold (1994) ===
The Gold model was introduced in 1994 with a limited set of features and options, and for a modest price. It was available in fewer exterior colours than other models, and was identified by a gold-plated badge on the boot and gold growler badge at the top of the radiator grille. Gold cars were fitted with the Kiwi-style wheels and painted with twin coachlines.

=== Insignia ===
In 1992, when Jaguar closed the DS420 Limo shop, all the craftsmen were left standing idle. Jaguar devised Insignia: a bespoke service for the XJ40/XJ81 and XJS, where prospective owners could specify special paint, trim, wood, and wheels at additional cost in any given combination. 318 XJ40 Insignias were produced, most of them can be identified by the oblong gold-on-black Insignia badges on the front wings, and by their above-standard interiors. All of the interior trim was done in leather (two-tone colouring being an option), opposed to the leather-vinyl combinations used on regular-spec cars. Special paint colours were introduced for the Insignia, including Mahogany, Amethyst Blue, Mineral Green, Primrose Pearl, Crystal Blue, Saturn Orange, Peppermint, Sandstone, White Pearl, and Lavender. A number of Insignias were put onto the Jaguar demo fleet to do the round of the dealerships to show all the options available in the Insignia line.

=== Police Special ===
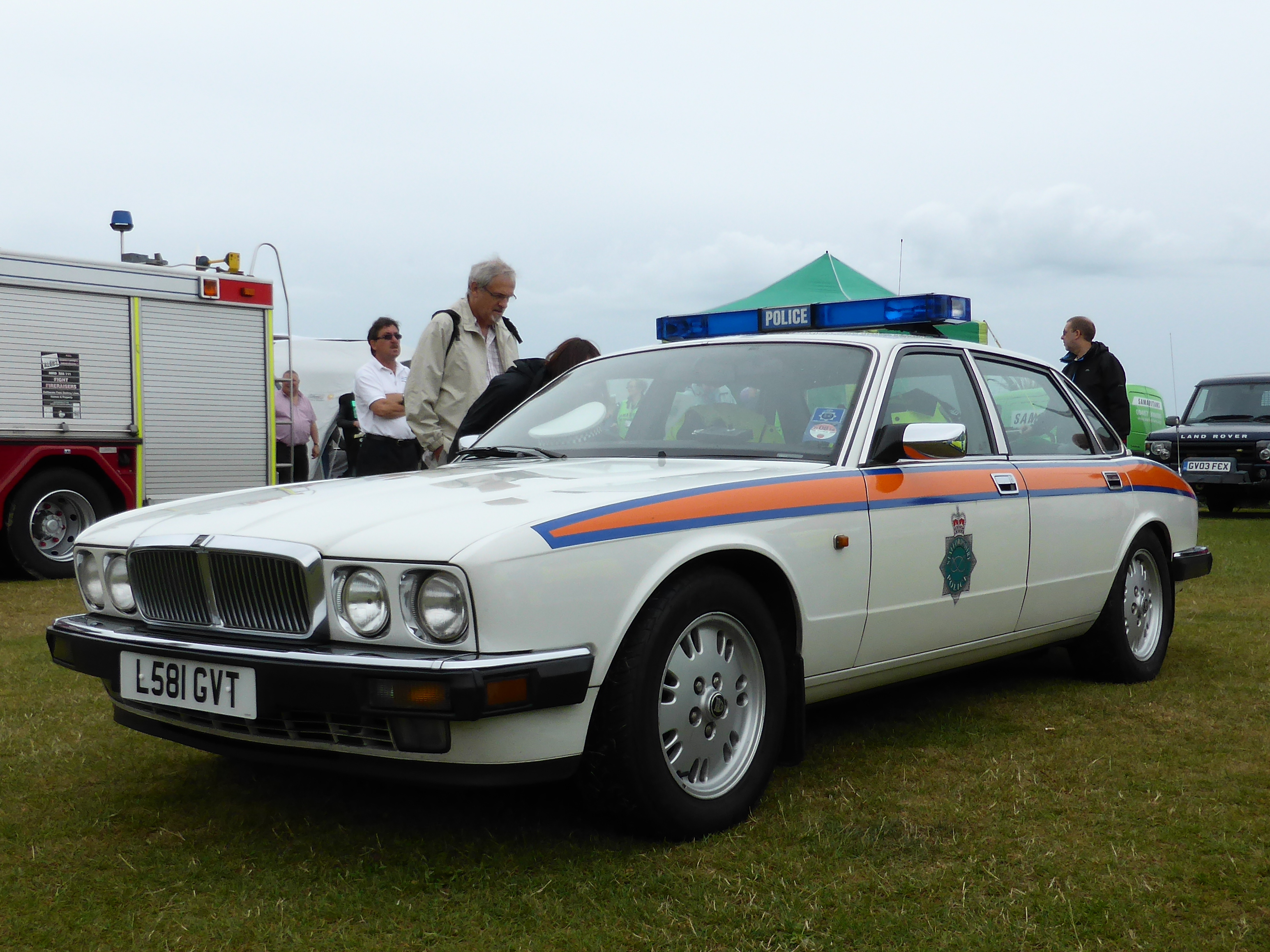
Jaguar XJ40 Police Special operated by Staffordshire Police

Like the Series III XJ, some XJ40s were converted to police cars for motorway traffic police duties in the United Kingdom. These XJ40s were badged as Police Special (PS) vehicles and received mainly plastic interiors devoid of luxury fittings. The most notable operator of XJ40 Police Specials was Staffordshire Police, who operated multiple examples of the type for use on the M6 motorway until 1999, when the last XJ40 in police use in the United Kingdom was withdrawn. Other operators of both marked and unmarked XJ40 Police Specials around the United Kingdom included the police forces of Derbyshire, Cumbria, Cambridgeshire, Durham, Northumbria, Northamptonshire, South Wales, Sussex, Tayside, Warwickshire and in the West Midlands. Police Special demonstrators was also converted by Jaguar into high-speed fire tenders for use at Donington Park and the Silverstone Circuit.

=== XJR (1988–1994) ===
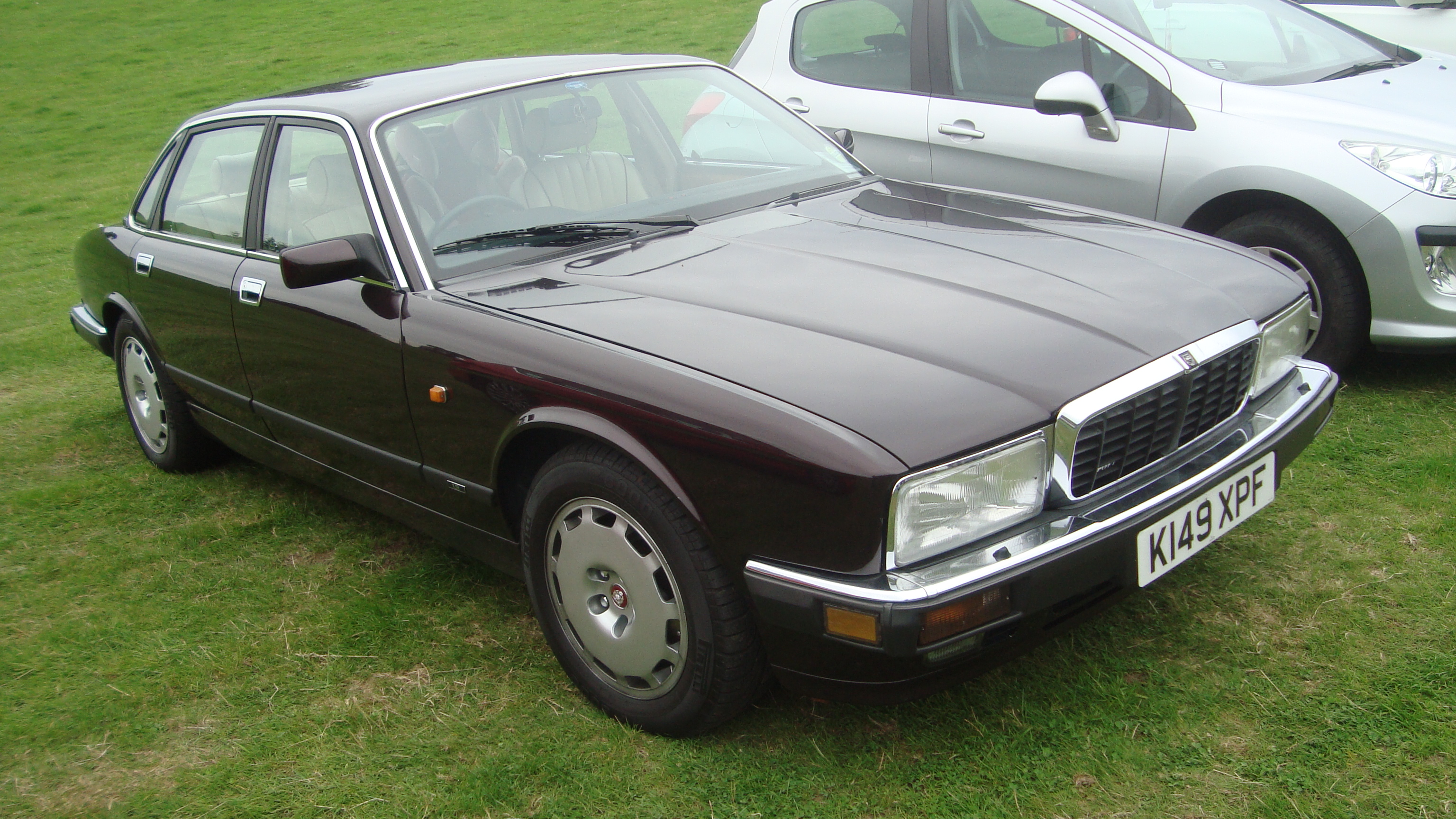
1993 Jaguar XJR

The XJR, introduced in 1988, was a high-performance model that was finished by the Oxfordshire-based JaguarSport company, a dual venture by Jaguar and Tom Walkinshaw Racing (TWR) team, at TWRs Kidlington-based factory alongside the XJ220. Based upon a Sovereign model, it was fitted with uprated suspension with unique Bilstein dampers, a revised power steering valve to increase the steering weight by 40% and special exterior paint and exterior styling touches. Early examples were fitted with a 3.6 L AJ6 engine in standard tune but later models had a TWR tuned version of the 4.0 AJ6, with new inlet manifolds, uprated cams, and a tweaked ECU. Some examples are also fitted with a larger bore JaguarSport exhaust system.

The XJR differed cosmetically from other XJ40 models with its body coloured bodykit, consisting of new front and rear valances and side skirts, all from fiberglass, a black grille with a JaguarSport badge in it and unique Speedline alloy wheels with wider tyres. Later models had ducting fitted to the front valance to feed cool air directly to the brake discs. The interior featured a leather MOMO steering wheel, JaguarSport logos on the dial faces, leather shift knob, and seat headrests embossed with the JaguarSport logo. The XJR model was introduced in 1988 and ceased production in 1994. In 1991, the appearance of the XJR changed when it switched to the rectangular headlights of the Sovereign model and was fitted with a different design of bodykit. Only a few hundred of each variation were produced, making the cars rare today.

=== XJ12 and Daimler Double Six (XJ81) ===
Given the model code XJ81, the XJ40-based XJ12 and Daimler Double Six were introduced at the Amsterdam Auto Show in February 1993 and powered by a 6.0-litre version of the Jaguar V12 engine. This was mated to a GM 4L80E 4-speed automatic gearbox. It could be identified by the XJ12 or Double Six badge on the rear and a V12 emblem on the glovebox. The XJ12 used the quad round headlamps, black radiator grille vanes, and a gold growler badge on the radiator grille top, while the Daimler received the rectangular headlamps. Early cars used stainless steel window frames, on later cars they were changed to black.

=== Daimler/Vanden Plas ===
The Daimler Company-branded cars represented the highest trim level, and were sold as their Vanden Plas model by Jaguar dealers in the United States. Like the Sovereign, it was fitted with the rectangular headlamps. Cosmetically, it differed from other models with its fluted radiator grille surround, boot-lid plinth and detail finishes. A Daimler interior features fold-out picnic tables for the rear passengers and a two-passenger rear seat versus the flat, three-passenger item on the Jaguars.

== Special uses ==
The car was used by two British prime ministers in the early 1990s, namely John Major and Tony Blair. Dating back to the Jaguar XJ (Series III) that was used by Margaret Thatcher, successive versions of the XJ were used as the prime ministerial car by Blair, Gordon Brown, David Cameron, Theresa May, and Boris Johnson.
