= Geoff Lawson (designer) =

British car designer (1944–1999)

- Born: 5 November 1944; Leicester, England
- Died: 24 June 1999 (aged 54); Coventry, England
- Occupation: Car designer
- Years active: 1969–1984 (General Motors); 1984–1999 (Jaguar)
- Children: 2 (one son, one daughter)

Geoff Lawson (5 November 1944 – 24 June 1999) was a British car designer and was Design Director for Jaguar from 1989 until his death in June 1999. He was succeeded at Jaguar by Ian Callum.

== Background ==
Lawson was born in Leicester, England in 1944. He studied Design at the Leicester College of Art before completing a master's degree in furniture design at the Royal College of Art, London. A man of diverse hobbies and interests, he was interested in American cars, guns and shooting, model making, guitar playing and guitar design, mountain biking, abstract art and sculpture.

== Career ==
=== General Motors ===
After graduating from the RCA, he joined the British subsidiary of General Motors, Vauxhall, as a designer, where he worked on various passenger cars and commercial vehicles. His work included many European and American projects and he progressed to Chief Designer level.

=== Jaguar ===
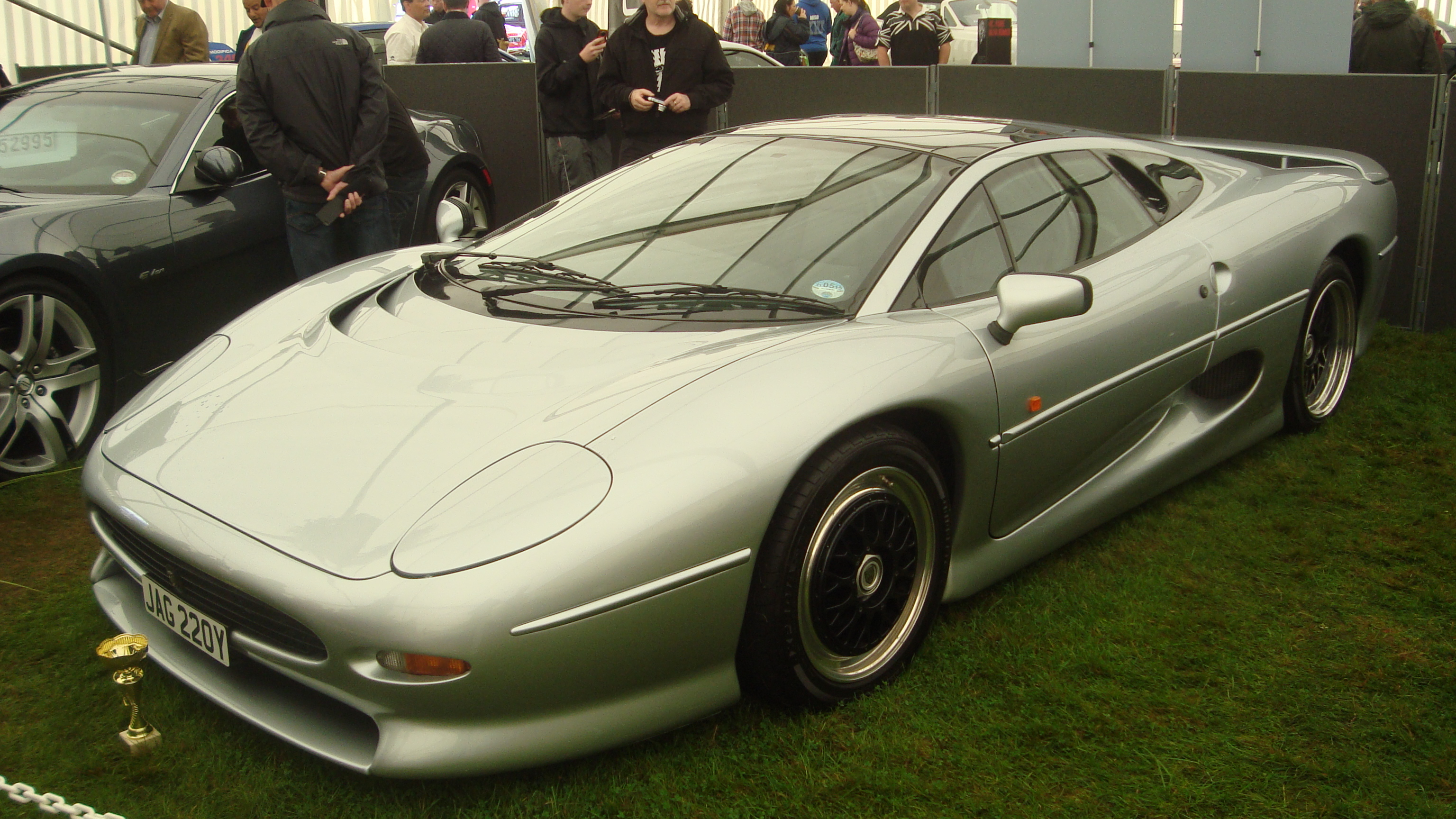
Jaguar XJ220

In 1984, he joined Jaguar as Director of Styling, where he arguably produced his best known and most influential work. He joined at a time when Jaguar was in financial trouble and it was losing its reputation for design and manufacturing excellence.

During his 15 years at Jaguar he was responsible for shaping the entire Jaguar line up, including the 1992 XJ220 supercar, the 1995 XJ luxury saloon, the 1996 XK grand tourer and the 1998 S-Type mid-size saloon. Before his death, he also supervised the styling of the 2001 X-Type compact saloon and the completely new aluminium-bodied 2004 XJ.

Lawson played a role in the commercial revival of the company, which in the last decade, and under new owner Ford, made record sales and a new-found reputation for good quality. This turnaround led to parent-company Ford and Jaguar's then chairman, Wolfgang Reitzle, to set ambitious sales targets in the belief that Jaguar could become a major luxury car manufacturer in the mould of Audi, BMW, and Mercedes-Benz.

== Legacy ==
He won numerous awards for his designs at Jaguar and also led a major expansion of the company’s styling resources and facilities at their Whitley Engineering Centre. In June 2000, Jaguar opened the Geoff Lawson Studio in his memory in Whitley, Coventry, which is responsible for producing future Jaguar concept cars. In addition, Jaguar endowed a scholarship at the RCA, The Geoff Lawson Jaguar Scholarship, in his honour to celebrate his achievements at Jaguar.
