= Jaguar 420 and Daimler Sovereign (1966–1969) =

Jaguar 420; Daimler Sovereign
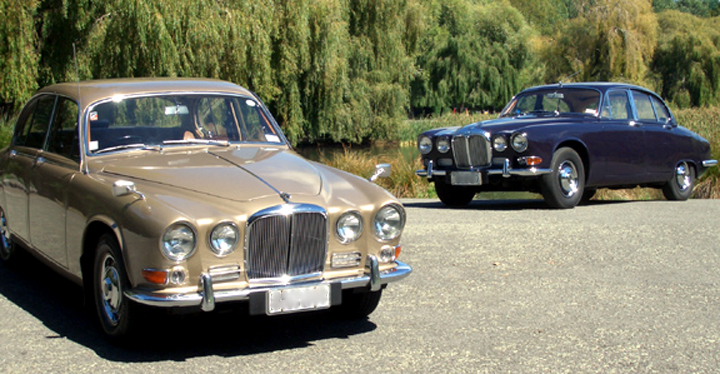
- 1968 Jaguar 420 (left) and 1967 Daimler Sovereign (right)

Overview
- Manufacturer: Jaguar Cars
- Production: Jaguar 420: 1966–1968; Daimler Sovereign: 1966–1969
- Assembly: United Kingdom: Coventry

Body and chassis
- Class: Sports saloon
- Body style: 4-door notchback saloon
- Layout: FR layout
- Related: Jaguar Mark 2; Jaguar Mark X

Powertrain
- Engine: 4.2 L XK I6
- Transmission: 4-speed manual (Jaguar only); 4-speed manual with overdrive; 3-speed Borg-Warner 35 automatic

Dimensions
- Wheelbase: 2,727 mm (107.4 in)
- Length: 4,762 mm (187.5 in)
- Width: 1,702 mm (67.0 in)
- Height: 1,429 mm (56.3 in)
- Kerb weight: 1,676 kg (3,695 lb)

Chronology
- Predecessor: Jaguar S-Type
- Successor: Jaguar XJ6

The Jaguar 420 (pronounced "four-twenty") and its Daimler Sovereign equivalent were introduced at the October 1966 London Motor Show and produced for two years as the ultimate expression of a series of "compact sporting saloons" offered by Jaguar throughout that decade, all of which shared the same wheelbase. Developed from the Jaguar S-Type, the 420 cost around £200 more than that model and effectively ended buyer interest in it, although the S-Type continued to be sold alongside the 420/Sovereign until both were supplanted by the Jaguar XJ6 late in 1968.

== Pedigree ==
The 420/Sovereign traces its origins back to the Jaguar Mark 2, which was introduced in 1959 and sold through most of the 1960s. The Mark 2 had a live rear axle and was powered by the XK six-cylinder engine first used in the Jaguar XK120 of 1948. The Mark 2 was available in 2.4, 3.4 and 3.8-litre engine capacities.

In 1961 Jaguar launched two new models with the triple SU carburettor version of the 3.8-litre XK engine and independent rear suspension: the Mark X (pronounced "mark ten") saloon and the E-Type sports car. Both cars used versions of the Jaguar independent rear suspension system, the Mark X having a 58-inch (1,500 mm) track and the E-Type a 50-inch (1,300 mm) track. In 1965 the Mark X and E-Type were updated with a new 4.2-litre version of the XK engine, still using triple carburettors.

In 1963 Jaguar introduced the Jaguar S-Type as a development of the Mark 2. It used a new intermediate-width, 54-inch (1,400 mm) version of the independent rear suspension in place of the live rear axle of the Mark 2. Other differences from the Mark 2 were extended rear bodywork to provide for a larger boot, a changed roofline for more rear seat passenger headroom, a slightly plusher interior and detail differences around the nose. The S-Type was available with either 3.4 or 3.8-litre XK engines (only 3.8-litre in US) but in twin-carburettor form because the triple-carburettor setup would not readily fit into what was essentially still the Mark 2 engine bay.

James Taylor suggests four reasons why Jaguar boss Sir William Lyons might have decided to add yet another model to an already extensive Jaguar range:

- sales of the Mark X were disappointing; the car was widely seen as being too big and cumbersome and a smaller car with similar standards of technical sophistication and luxury he thought could be more successful
- demands for more luxurious features would add weight to any future models, forcing the drive towards a 4.2-litre-engined compact saloon
- a combination of the 4.2-litre engine with the compact saloon body was expected to have market appeal
- aesthetic objections to the controversially styled S-Type were known to be harming its sales.

Consequently, Lyons initiated development of a new saloon based on the S-Type, retaining its 54-inch independent rear suspension but adding a twin-carburettor version of the 4.2-litre powerplant and frontal styling more akin to that of the Mark X. The new car was released in August 1966 in the form of two badge-engineered models, the Jaguar 420 and the Daimler Sovereign equivalent.

== Design ==
=== Styling ===
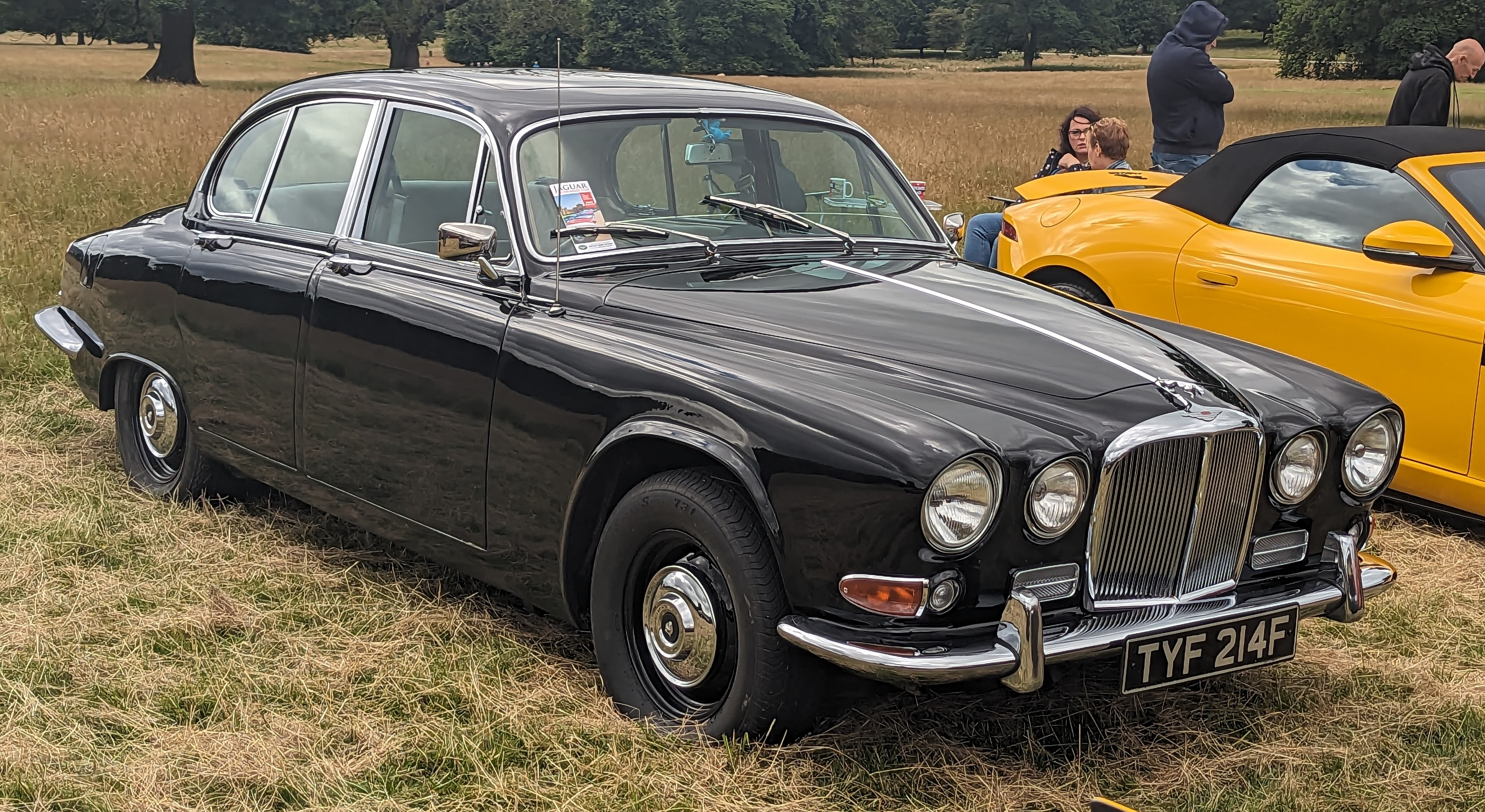
Jaguar 420 (3/4 front view)

The starting point for design of the 420/Sovereign was the Jaguar S-Type, which had been in production since 1963 but whose styling had never met with universal acceptance.

In styling terms, the 420/Sovereign was essentially an S-Type with that car's curvaceous nose made much more linear, the better to match its rear styling (which was not altered). Contouring around its four lamps was relatively subtle, with small peaks over each, and its flat frontage sloped forward slightly. The square grille with central divider matched that of the 420G, (which was the new name given to the Mark X at the time of the 420/Sovereign's release). The low-set fog lamps of the Mark 2 and S-Type were replaced by a pair of inner headlamps at the same level as the main headlamps. The inner lamps were lit on main beam only. Dummy horn grilles were added below each inner headlamp to break up what would otherwise have been a large expanse of flat metal on either side of the radiator grille. The tops of the front wheel arches were flattened to match the squarer lines of the nose. The slimline bumpers dispensed with the centre dip which had characterised the bumpers of the Mark 2 and S-Type. All this was done to improve the car's aesthetic balance compared with the S-Type and to create a family resemblance to the Mark X/420G, changes which Sir William could not afford (in either time or money) when the S-Type was designed. No attempt was made to give the 420/Sovereign the same front-hinged bonnet as the Mark X/420G and it retained a rear-hinged bonnet of similar dimensions to those of the S-Type and Mark 2.

=== Interior ===
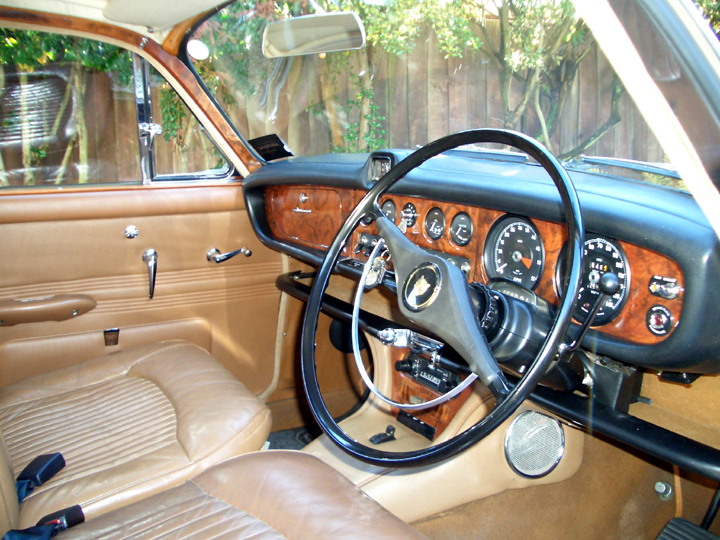
Jaguar 420 interior

Changes to the S-Type's interior to create the 420/Sovereign were driven mainly by safety considerations, with the wood cappings on the doors and dashboard replaced with padded Rexine and a wooden garnish rail on the tops of the door linings. The clock was relocated from the tachometer to the centre of the dashboard top rail, where it was powered by its own battery. The S-Type's pull out map tray below the central instrument panel was not carried over although the 420 retained the same central console and under-dash parcel tray. The seats of the 420 were of slightly different proportions from the S-Type, although they appeared very similar.

=== Engine ===
The 4.2-litre XK engine of the 420/Sovereign was fitted with the straight port cylinder head and 3/8-inch lift cams. Compression ratios of 7:1, 8:1 and 9:1 could be specified according to local fuel quality, the difference being obtained by varying the crown design of the pistons. The engine was fed by just two carburettors and developed a claimed 245 bhp (183 kW; 248 PS) gross at 5,500 rpm, which was 20 bhp (15 kW; 20 PS) less than the triple-carburettor version in the 420G and E-Type. The maximum torque of the engine at 283 lb⋅ft (384 N⋅m) was virtually the same as that of the triple-carburettor version yet was achieved at 3,750 rpm rather than 4,000 rpm.

The factory-quoted horsepower rating of 245 bhp (183 kW; 248 PS) was measured using the SAE (gross) system current in the USA at the time the 420/Sovereign was sold there. The SAE (gross) system excluded many accessory drives and often used non-standard induction and exhaust systems and so was replaced by the more accurate SAE (net) system in 1972, long after the 420/Sovereign had gone out of production. Reference states that the DIN horsepower rating of the 1977 USA specification 4.2-litre Series II XJ6 was equivalent to 180 bhp. The DIN system yields horsepower ratings which, for most technical purposes, are the same as those that would be obtained using the SAE (net) system. However, the 1977 test would have included power-sapping emissions equipment not present on the 420/Sovereign. Therefore, the SAE (net) power rating of the 420/Sovereign must have lain somewhere between 180 bhp and 245 bhp.

=== Mechanical ===
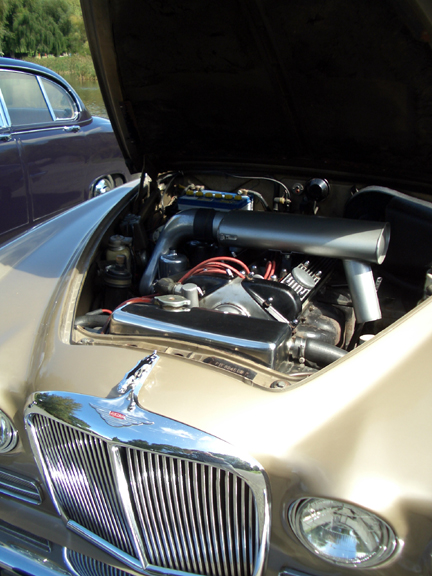
Jaguar 420 engine bay

A novel mechanical feature that the 420/Sovereign shared with the 420G was Marles Varamatic power steering, which was offered as an option on the 420 but was standard on the Sovereign. Built by Adwest Engineering Co Ltd of Reading, England, it was a "cam and roller" system in which the non-constant pitch of the cam resulted in a variable steering ratio, with the lowest gearing being at the straight ahead, rising rapidly to either lock. The rise in gearing (equivalent to a drop in ratio from 21.6:1 to 13:1) occurred almost entirely within the first half turn of the steering wheel from the straight-ahead position. The effect was to give very light and relaxed steering at the straight ahead, with quick reaction when cornering. There was no adjustment in the behaviour of the steering in reaction to road speed. A very few of the last S-Types were similarly equipped.

Other mechanical refinements the 420/Sovereign had over the S-Type included:

- replacement of the Borg Warner Type 35 automatic transmission with the stronger Model 8
- a more efficient cross-flow radiator in place of the S-Type's smaller vertical flow type
- a dual-line hydraulic braking system replacing the S-Type's single line system
- twin 2-inch HD8 SU carburettors (cf. the S-Type's twin 1.75-inch HD6 SUs)
- brake discs featuring a peripheral cast-iron anti-squeal ring
- a Holset "Torquatrol" viscous coupled engine cooling fan
- negative earthing, the S-Type was positive earth
- a pre-engaged starter instead of a Bendix pinion
- an alternator rather than the S-Type's dynamo

== Performance ==
Contemporary road tests indicate that the performance of the 420 and Sovereign was very highly thought of.

A Motor (UK) road test in May 1967 reported:

It seems somehow insolent to apply medium [price] standards to a saloon that for a combination of speed, comfort and safety is as good as any in the world, regardless of cost.

A North American perspective was provided by Road & Track, whose December 1967 report concluded:

Jaguar's big seller in the U.S. remains the E-type sports cars, but the 420 sedan offers just as unique a combination of qualities in its own field. For a reasonable basic price of $5900, Jaguar offers brisk performance, outstanding braking, excellent handling and ride, quality finish, and luxury in abundance, all in an automobile that's easy to maneuver in today's maddening traffic.

A road test by Wheels (Australia) in August 1967 enthused:

While they can continue to build and sell cars as good as this, there is hope for the man who cares about his motoring.

In terms of performance measured under test conditions, 0–60 mph in under 10 seconds and a top speed of more than 125 mph (201 km/h) were typical. Such performance figures were superior to those of many of the 4.2-litre XJ6 models that followed. Among the few exceptions the testers took was to its 15–16 mpg average fuel consumption, which even for the late 1960s was rather high. Combined with the modest size of its two 7 Imperial gallon (31.75 litre) fuel tanks, such fuel consumption gave the model a touring range of only around 250 miles (403 km).

== Daimler ==
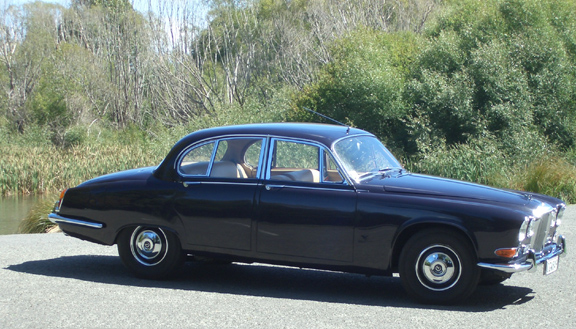
Daimler Sovereign

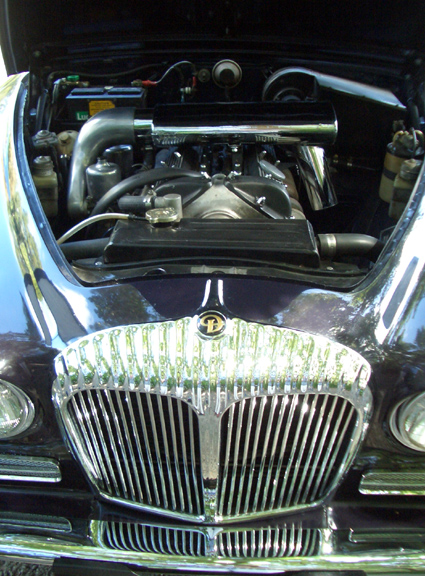
Daimler Sovereign engine bay

Whereas the Daimler 2½-litre V8 released in 1962 differed from the Jaguar Mark 2 in having a genuine Daimler engine, only the Sovereign's badging and aspects of interior trim differentiated it from the 420.

The market perception of the two marques Daimler and Jaguar, which the material differences between them sought to foster, was that the Daimler represented luxury motoring for the discerning and more mature gentleman whereas the Jaguar was a sporting saloon aimed at a somewhat younger clientele. In the Daimler model range, the Sovereign filled a gap between the 2½-litre V8 and the larger and more conservatively styled 4½-litre Majestic Major. Prices in the UK of the basic 420 and Sovereign, as quoted in the Motor magazine of October 1966 were:

Manual o/d – Jaguar £1615, Daimler £1724
Automatic – Jaguar £1678, Daimler £1787

In return for the ≈6.5 % difference in price, the Daimler purchaser obtained only a few substantive advantages but would have considered the cachet of the Daimler badge to be well worth the extra money; indeed the Daimler name attracted buyers who disliked the Jaguar's racier image. By the same token, rather than being unable to afford the difference for a Daimler, those who chose the Jaguar are unlikely to have regarded the Daimler as something they would wish to own anyway.

In total, the Daimler differed from the Jaguar in having:

- a plastic insert on the rear number plate housing bearing the Daimler name. On the 420 the cast number plate housing bore the Jaguar name and on the Sovereign this remained beneath the plastic "Daimler" insert
- wheel trim centres, horn button, oil filler cap and seat belt clasps carrying the stylised D rather than the title Jaguar, a Jaguar’s head ('growler') or no badging at all
- ribbed camshaft covers bearing the inscription ‘Daimler’ rather than ‘Jaguar’, (although earlier versions shared the same polished alloy covers)
- all of the 420 extras as standard, including a heated rear window, overdrive on manual transmission cars and power assisted steering
- a flying D mascot at the forward edge of the bonnet in place of the leaping cat Jaguar mascot ('leaper') above the radiator grille
- a fluted radiator grille with stylised D badge in place of the smooth crowned and Jaguar-badged grille
- arguably more carefully selected and matched walnut veneer trim
- higher grade Vaumol ventilated leather seat centre sections
- better quality covers for the sun visors

== Differentiation ==
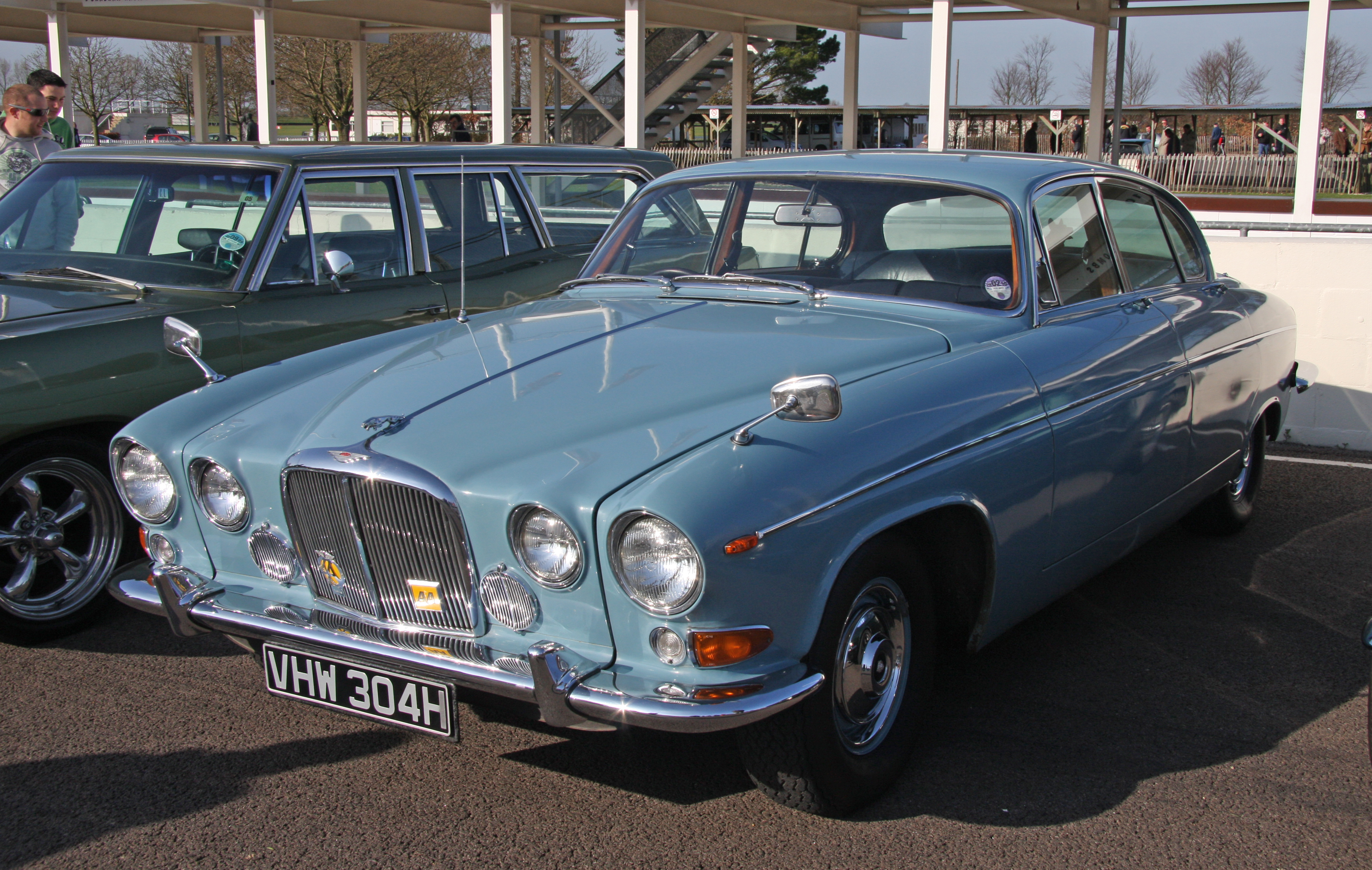
The larger, Mark X-based Jaguar 420G

Difficulty in differentiating the 420/Sovereign from other Jaguar/Daimler models has meant that they are less well known than other Browns Lane products of the era. Even some Jaguar enthusiasts are unsure exactly where and when the 420/Sovereign fitted into the Jaguar range.

At the same time as the 420 was released, Jaguar added a chrome side strip and side repeater indicator to the Mark X and a centre bar to its grille. Along with alterations to the interior, these changes were used to justify renaming it the 420G ("G" for Grand). The Motor magazine of October 1966 referred to the 420G as "still one of the best looking large cars in the world today" and commented on the similarity of its new radiator grille to that of the 420. Given the similarity between both the names and frontal styling of the 420 and 420G, the casual observer might be forgiven for mistaking one for the other.

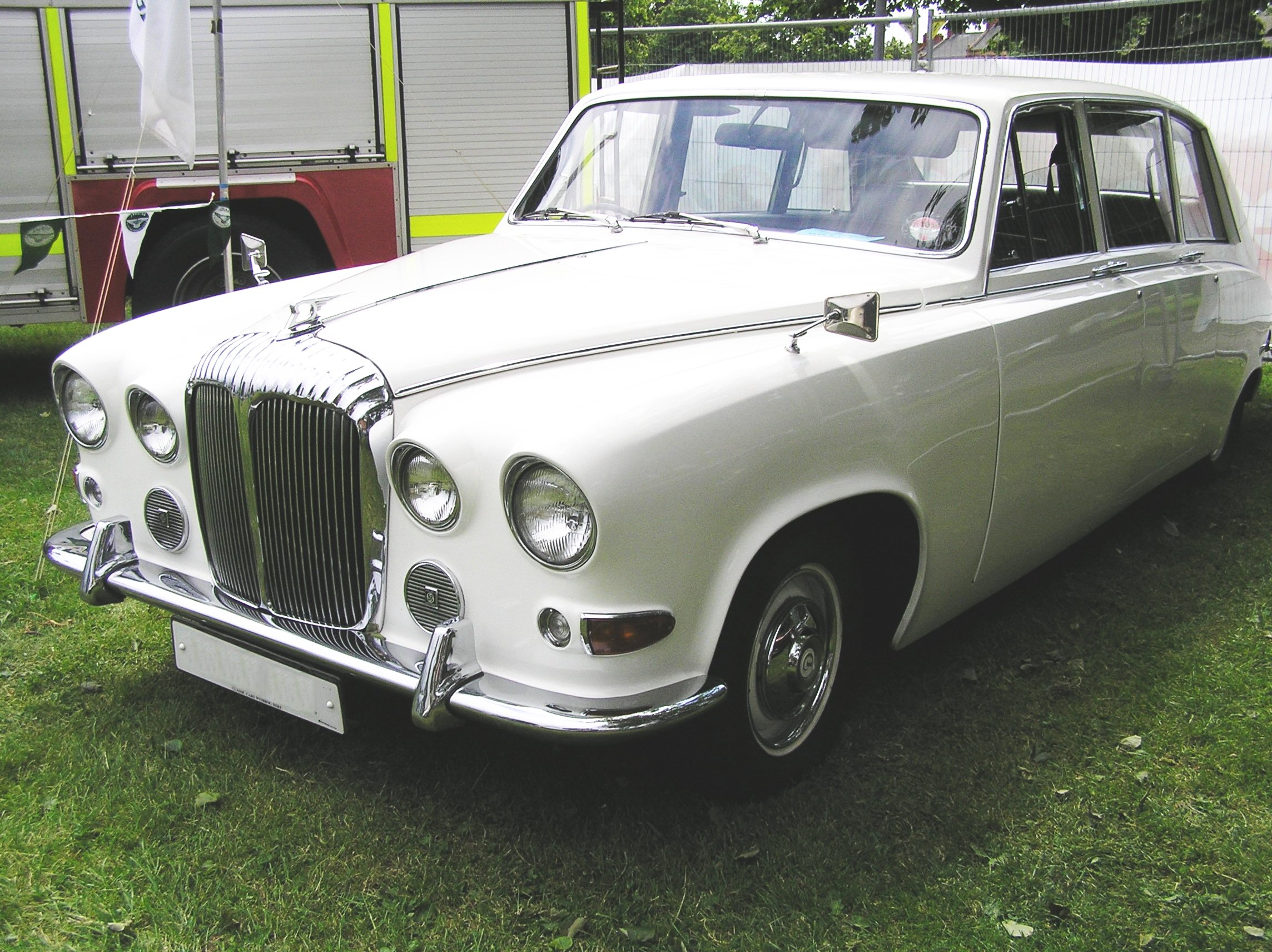
Daimler DS420

In 1968 the Daimler DS420 limousine began to be produced, carrying a similarly styled grille to the Sovereign and using the 4.2-litre Jaguar engine in twin carburettor form, and also undergoing final assembly at Jaguar's Browns Lane factory in Coventry, England. Although this car was based on a modified 420G floorpan rather than that of the 420, the existence of a third Jaguar-manufactured model with "420" in its name provides further scope for confusion.

Similar confusion arises with regard to the Daimler Sovereign. From late 1969 its Series I Jaguar XJ6-based successor continued with the Daimler Sovereign name until 1983, when the "Sovereign" model name was instead applied to the high-specification version of the Jaguar (which by then was into its Series III XJ6 iteration).

== Demise ==
In 1967, its first full year of production, the 420/Sovereign easily outsold the other Jaguar saloon models still in production (the 240 and 340 Jaguar Mark 2s, Daimler 250 V8, Jaguar S-Type and 420G) and effectively ended buyer interest in the S-Type. Nevertheless, relatively few were made in total due to the fact that the Coventry factory stopped making the Jaguar 420 in 1968, just over two years after production began and with just 10,236 produced. The Daimler Sovereign continued into 1969 and 5,824 were sold.

In 1968, 420/Sovereign sales were again well in excess of those of the S-Type and 420G but it was outsold by the resurgent Jaguar Mark 2/Daimler 250. By this time, many potential 420/Sovereign buyers were hanging back to wait for the new Jaguar XJ6. Introduced late in 1968, the XJ6 was slightly larger than the 420 and swept it from the Jaguar range along with the Mark 2 and S-Type, although the Daimler 250 remained in production into 1969 and the 420G lasted until 1970.

The decision by Sir William Lyons to base the Jaguar XJ6 on the engine, suspension and approximate dimensions of the 420/Sovereign showed his faith in the 420/Sovereign formula as the best way to rationalise the company's saloon car range. In that way, the 420/Sovereign became a victim of its own success.

The Jaguar 420 ceased production at Browns Lane in September 1968 and the Daimler Sovereign in July 1969, although CKD ("completely knocked down") Jaguar 420 kits were supplied as late as November 1968 for assembly by Jaguar Cars South Africa Ltd.

== Scale models ==
As yet, no diecast model of either the 420 or Sovereign has been produced.

- Airfix produced a 1/32 scale plastic kit of the 420 during the car's production run in 1968, which was reissued in 2021.
- MPC models released the Airfix 1/32 scale plastic kit of the 420 during the 1960s / early 1970's, kit No. 1006-100
- Neo Scale Models currently produce a 1:43 resin moulded model of the 420 and also a Sovereign version.

== Specifications ==
Engine	Jaguar 6-cylinder in line, iron block, alloy head
Capacity	4,235 cc (258.4 cu in)
Bore/Stroke	92.07 mm × 106 mm (3.6 in × 4.2 in)
Valves	DOHC, 2 valves per cylinder
Compression Ratio	8:1 (7:1 and 9:1 optional)
Max. Power	245 bhp (183 kW; 248 PS) (SAE Gross) @ 5,500 rpm
Max. Torque	283 lb⋅ft (384 N⋅m) @ 3,750 rpm
Carburettors	Twin SU HD8 (2 in)
Suspension	Front independent, with wishbones, coil springs with telescopic dampers and anti-roll bar Rear independent, with lower wishbone and driveshaft as upper link, radius arms and twin coil springs with telescopic dampers
Steering	Recirculating ball, worm and nut; Varamatic power assistance optional on Jaguar (standard on Daimler)
Brakes	Servo assisted discs on all four wheels, inboard at rear
Body/Chassis	Monocoque bodyshell with bolted front subframe, five-seater saloon, front engine, rear-wheel drive
Tyres/Wheels	6.40 × 15 crossply or 185 × 15 radial, 5.5 in rim, five-stud disc wheels with wire spoke optional
Track	Front=1,410 mm (56 in) Rear=1,384 mm (54 in)
Weight (dry)	1695 kg
