= Jaguar S-Type (1963) =

Jaguar S-Type (1963–1968)
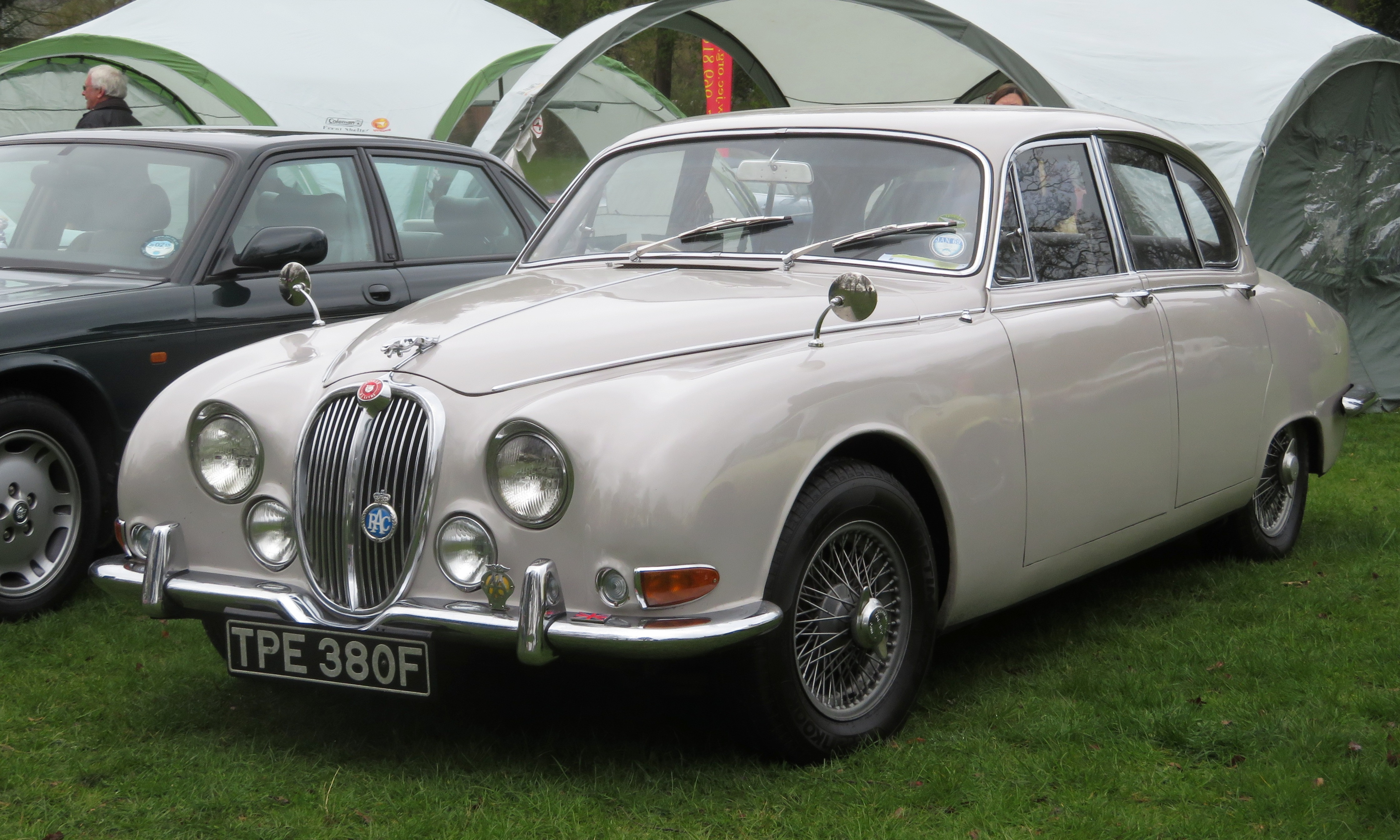

Overview
- Manufacturer: Jaguar Cars
- Production: 1963–1968
- Assembly: United Kingdom: Coventry

Body and chassis
- Class: Sports saloon
- Body style: 4-door saloon
- Layout: FR layout
- Related: Jaguar Mark X

Powertrain
- Engine: 3.4 L or 3.8 L XK I6
- Transmission: 4-speed manual; 4-speed manual with overdrive; 3-speed Borg-Warner 35 automatic

Dimensions
- Wheelbase: 2,730 mm (107.5 in)
- Length: 4,750 mm (187.0 in)
- Width: 1,683 mm (66.3 in)
- Height: 1,416 mm (55.7 in)
- Kerb weight: 1,625 kg (3,583 lb)

Chronology
- Predecessor: Jaguar Mark 2
- Successor: Jaguar 420; Jaguar XJ6 (direct successor); Jaguar S-Type (1999) (spiritual successor)

The Jaguar S-Type is a luxury saloon car produced by Jaguar Cars in the United Kingdom from 1963 to 1968. Announced on 30 September 1963 it was a technically more sophisticated development of the Mark 2, offering buyers a more luxurious alternative without the size and expense of the Mark X. The S-Type sold alongside the Mark 2, as well as the Jaguar 420 following its release in 1966. A retro-styled vehicle with the same name was also produced, based on the design of the original S-Type vehicles.

== History ==
The Jaguar Mark 2 was introduced in 1959 and sold throughout most of the 1960s. It has a live rear axle and is powered by the XK six-cylinder engine first used in the Jaguar XK120 of 1948. In the Mark 2 the engine was available in 2.4, 3.4 and 3.8-litre capacities.

In 1961 Jaguar launched two new models. The full size Jaguar Mark X saloon (pronounced mark ten) used Jaguar's new independent rear suspension and a triple SU carburettor version of the 3.8-litre XK engine. The other new car for 1961 was the Jaguar E-Type sports car, which shared the same 3.8-litre engine as the Mark X and a scaled-down version of the independent rear suspension.

Having released the Mark X with its many technical refinements, Jaguar boss Sir William Lyons expected the Mark 2 would need updating with similar features if it was to retain its place in the market. Accordingly, work began on developing the S-Type (codenamed "Utah Mk III", the Mark 2 having been "Utah Mk II") as soon as development work was finished on the Mark X.

The S-Type was a major redevelopment of the Mark 2. It used a mid-scale version of the Mark X independent rear suspension to replace the Mark 2's live rear axle and featured longer rear bodywork, among other styling and interior changes. The S-Type was available with either 3.4 or 3.8-litre XK engines but only in twin carburettor form because the triple carburettor setup would not fit into what was essentially still the Mark 2 engine bay.

By the time of the S-Type's release in 1963, the Mark 2 remained an unexpectedly strong seller despite its age. Although the Mark X was selling less well than hoped, especially in its intended market of the U.S., Sir William decided to retain all three models in the Jaguar range concurrently. The Mark X was renamed "420G" in 1966 and was joined by another new model, the 4.2-litre 420. The 420 was developed to replace the S-Type but because some demand remained for the S-Type, all four saloon models (Mark 2, S-Type, 420 and 420G) remained on sale until the arrival of the Jaguar XJ6 in 1968. The XJ6 replaced all but the 420G in the Jaguar range.

== Development ==
=== Engines ===
No new engines were developed for the S-Type. It was first released with the SU HD-8 twin-carburettor variant of the 3.8-litre XK engine, the same as that which powered the 3.8-litre Mark 2. The 3.8-litre was the only engine offered on S-Types sold into the US market.

The lower powered 3.4-litre S-Type used the same 3.4-litre engine as the Mark 2. It was released a few months after the 3.8S and was not made available at any stage on Jaguar's press demonstrator fleet in the UK. Whereas the 3.4-litre version remained the most popular engine option for the Mark 2, the 3.8-litre S-Type outsold the 3.4 S in the ratio 3 to 2, this despite the 3.8 S being discontinued in mid-1968, a couple of months before the 3.4S.

=== Mechanical ===
Despite the S-Type's weight gain of 152 kg (335 lb) over the Mark 2, no changes were deemed necessary to the Dunlop four-wheel disc braking system.

Major changes were made to the S-Type's steering system. The Burman power steering system in the Mark 2, with its 4.3 turns lock-to-lock, was regarded as being excessively low geared and lacking in road feel. In the S-Type it was replaced by a higher-geared Burman unit of 3.5 turns lock-to-lock, which linked the input shaft and hydraulic valve by a torsion spring to improve its "feel".

The heating and ventilating system of the Mark 2 was not considered adequate for the more upmarket S-Type and was replaced with an improved system. Separate control of ventilation direction was provided for both driver and front seat passenger. Warm air could also be directed to the rear passengers through an outlet situated on the propeller shaft tunnel cover between the two front seats.

=== Suspension ===
A key element of the Mark X that Jaguar wanted to include in the S-Type was its sophisticated, and by then widely acclaimed, Jaguar independent rear suspension. The suspension was a revelation at the time of its introduction, and remained the benchmark against which others were judged until the 1980s. Essentially a double wishbone setup, it uses the driveshaft as the upper wishbone. It carries the drive, braking, suspension and damping units in a single fabricated steel crossbridge, which is isolated from the bodyshell by rubber blocks. Including this suspension in the S-Type necessitated the development of a new crossbridge suitable for its 54-inch (140 cm) track, coming as it did between the 58-inch (150 cm) track of the Mark X and 50-inch (130 cm) track of the E-Type.

The S-Type used the same subframe mounted, coil sprung, twin wishbone front suspension as the Mark 2.

=== Styling ===
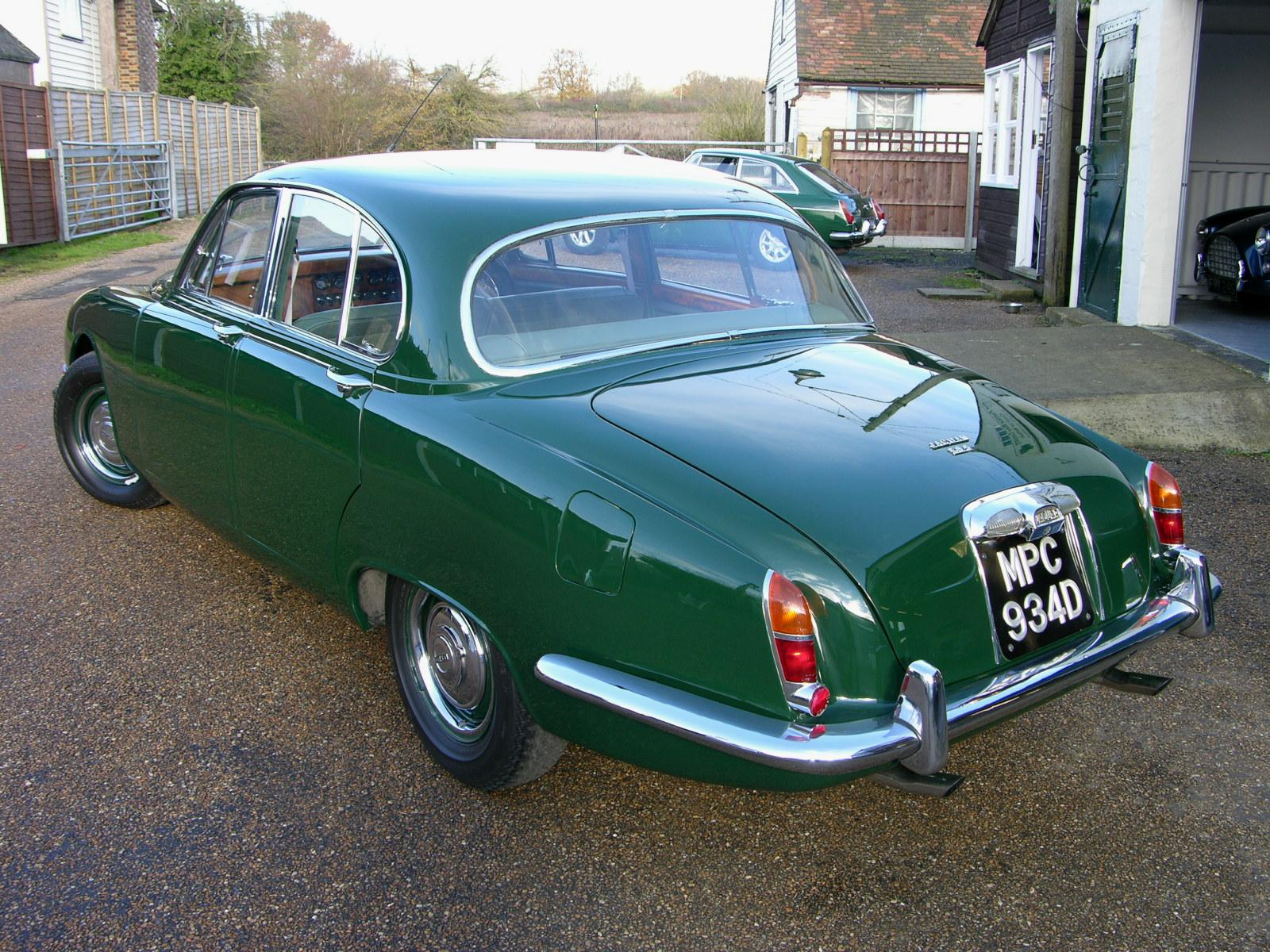
Rear 3/4 view of 1966 Jaguar S-Type 3.8

Lyons wanted to introduce some of the Mark X's sleeker and sharper lines into the S-Type but with limited time and money available, most effort was applied to restyling the rear bodywork. The S-Type was given extended rear bodywork similar to that on the Mark X, which also gave it a much larger boot than the Mark 2. Relatively minor changes were made to the frontal styling of the car in an attempt to balance the longer rear styling, but the overall effect at the front was still very rounded. The only change made to the center section was to flatten and extend the rear roof line, which made the car look larger and helped to give rear seat passengers slightly more headroom.

The styling of the S-Type was regarded by many of those who worked on it as being not altogether successful. The mismatch between the horizontal lines of its rear styling and the rounded front was least flattering when viewing the car from the front quarter. This ref. quotes Cyril Crouch, assistant chief body engineer at Browns Lane during development of the S-Type, as saying:

"We ourselves appreciated what an ugly looking car it was, and when it came out there was a ... 'Is that the best you can do?' sort of thing! People like myself had to take the stick for producing such an abomination! Perhaps I shouldn't call it that, but I think everyone was very pleased to see the end of the S and move on to the 420. It seemed an odd-looking vehicle."

The reasonable sales success of the S-Type prior to the release of the Jaguar 420 suggests that not everyone was as offended by its styling as Mr Crouch. Nevertheless, the 420 did "finish the job" in a styling sense by adding to the car a squarer, four-headlamp front end more like that of the Mark X.

The significant styling changes between the Mark II and the S-Type were: the tail was extended, with styling features similar to the Mark X, but scaled down; the Mark 2's spats over the rear wheels were deleted and the rear guards reshaped and brought lower over the wheels; new slimline bumpers were used front and rear, the front bumper still featuring a dip to reveal the full depth of the radiator grille; wraparound indicators and low mounted sidelights were added at the bottoms of the front wings; the fog lamps were recessed more deeply into the wing fronts; the grille was given a thicker surround and center bar; the headlamps were given a small peak, making the car look longer and thus going some way towards balancing the longer tail; the roofline was lowered, made flatter and extended rearwards slightly; and the rear window became larger and more upright.

=== Bodyshell ===
Starting with the Mark 2's unitary bodyshell, Jaguar's engineers had to alter it to accommodate the independent rear suspension's extra bulk and weight and to extend the rear bodywork. Structural changes at the front were minimal and no changes at all were made to the inner scuttle, windscreen or dashboard structure.

Among the significant structural differences between the Mark 2 and S-Type are: the re-profiled roof line resulted in the B-pillar being approximately 1 inch (25 mm) lower and the rear window aperture being larger and more upright; the Mark 2's underbody reinforcing rails were extended to the rear of the car and enclosed, sweeping up and over the space for the rear suspension assembly; the boot floor was double-skinned and ribbed for additional strength; the spare wheel well was relocated centrally in the boot floor (it was on the right in the Mark 2); the lid of the new longer boot was secured by two catches rather than the single catch of the Mark 2; the 12 imp gal (55 L; 14 US gal) fuel tank was removed from under the boot floor and replaced by two 7 imp gal (32 L; 8 US gal) tanks, one inside each rear wing; new front wings were made to carry the frontal styling changes listed above; new attachment points were made for the new wings and bumpers; and new wheel arches were made to match the new front guards and rear structure.

=== Interior ===
The S-Type's interior again reflected the styling of the Mark X but included features particular to the S-Type. Changes to the rear seat accommodation gave the impression of far greater room than in the rear of a Mark 2 and changes to the front of the cabin also gave the impression of greater luxury.

Interior differences between the Mark 2 and S-Type included a scaled-down Mark X burled Belgian walnut veneer dashboard with a burled walnut pull-out map tray below the centre section, the veneer extending to the dashboard centre section, which in the Mark 2 had been covered with black vinyl; a full-width parcel tray was fitted below the dashboard; new controls were provided to go with the improved heating and ventilation system; the front seats were widened to give the appearance of being almost full width, and each was provided with an inboard armrest; the centre console was redesigned to suit the wider front seats and rear compartment heating arrangements; the door trims were given horizontal fluting; Mark X type armrests were added to the front doors along with an elasticated map pocket; the rear doors were given new armrests with a flip-top ashtray and magazine pocket; the front seats were given a new fore and aft adjustment mechanism that raised the rear of the seat as it was moved forwards; the backs of the front seats were made thinner to the benefit of rear seat passenger legroom, and the rear seat had a 50 mm (2.0 in) thinner squab and its backrest was more steeply angled, further benefiting headroom already enhanced by the slightly higher rear roof line. These changes did, however, leave longer legged rear seat passengers in a fairly uncomfortable "knee-high" posture.

Interior of a 1966 car

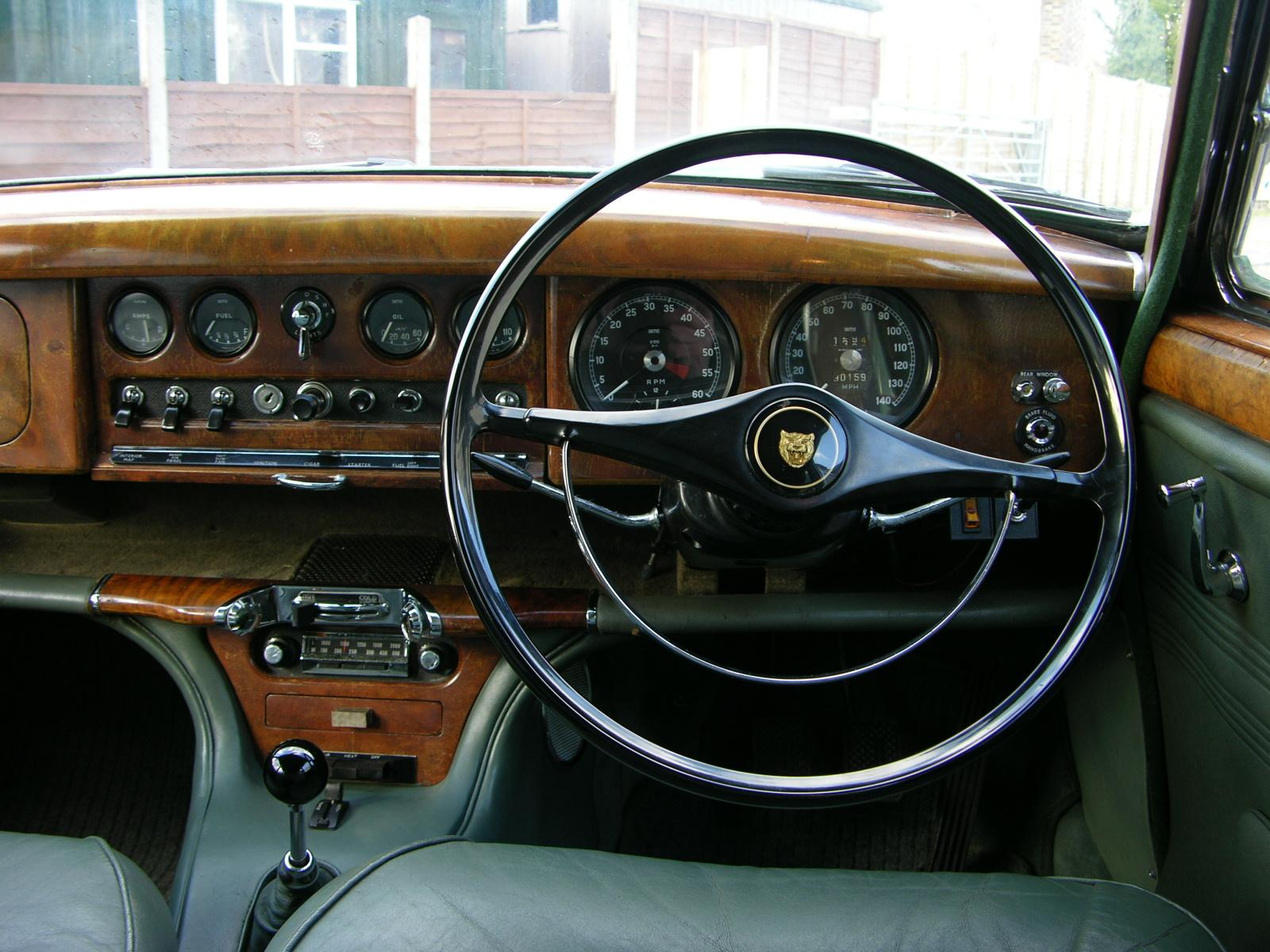

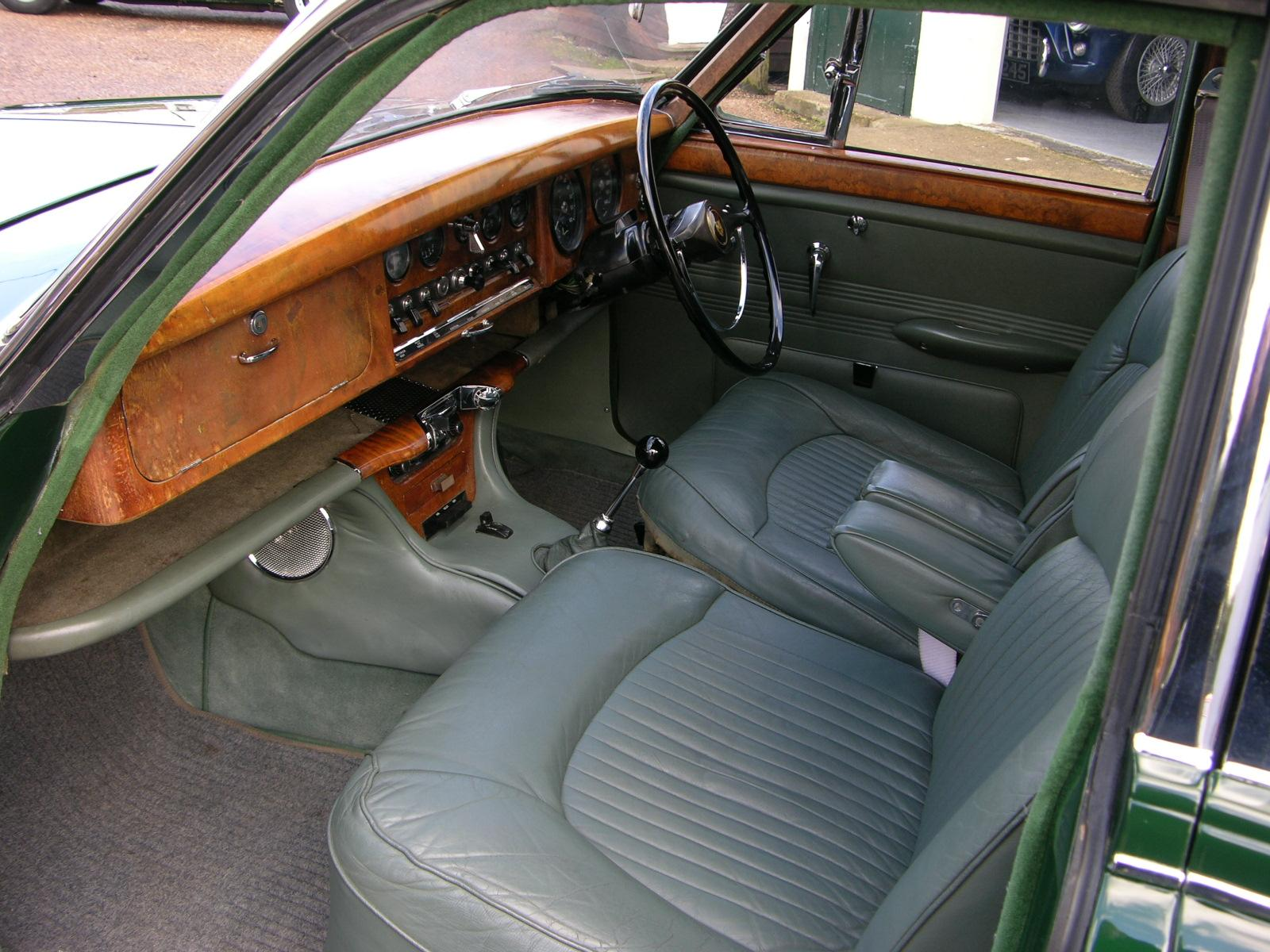

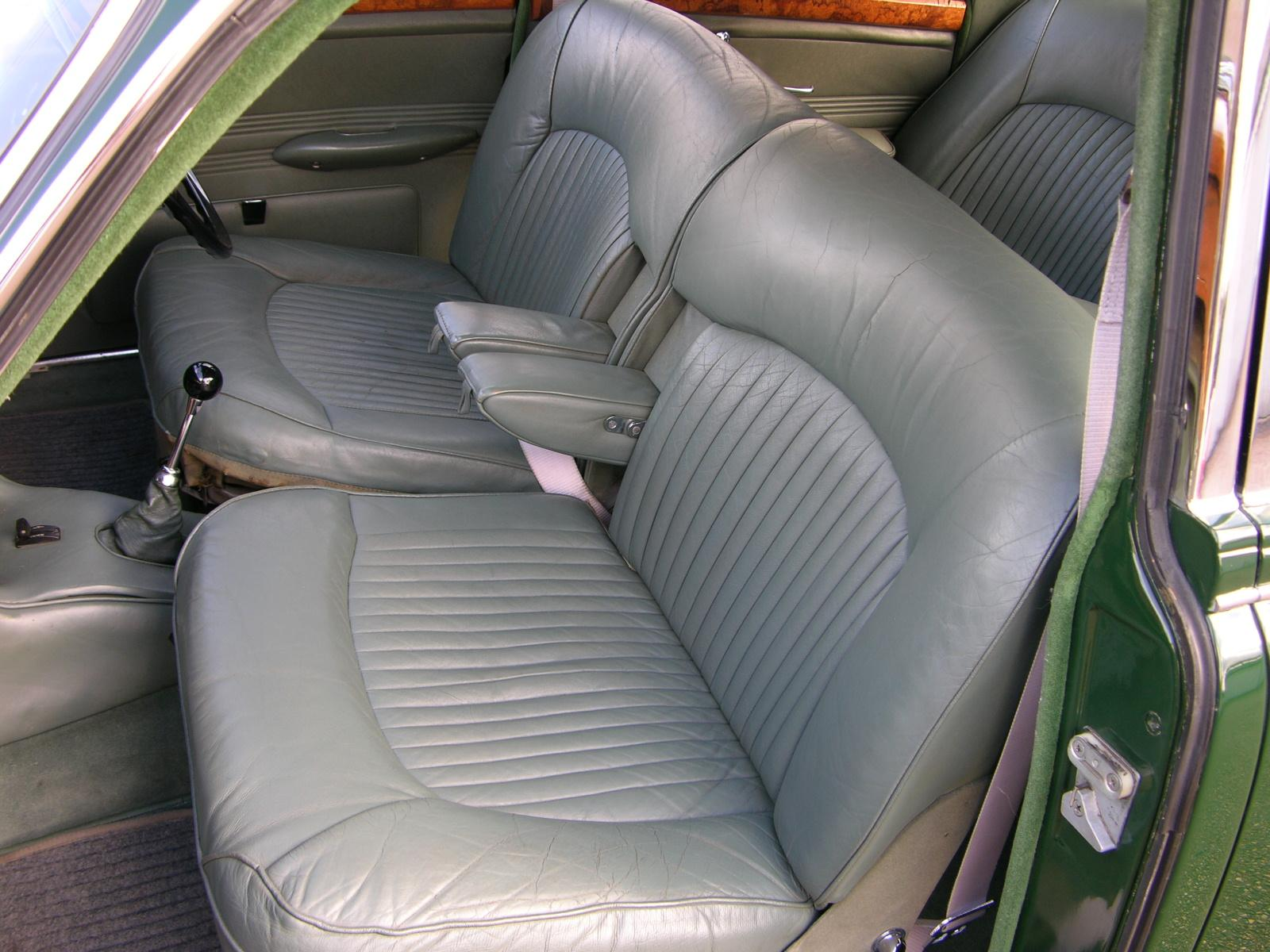

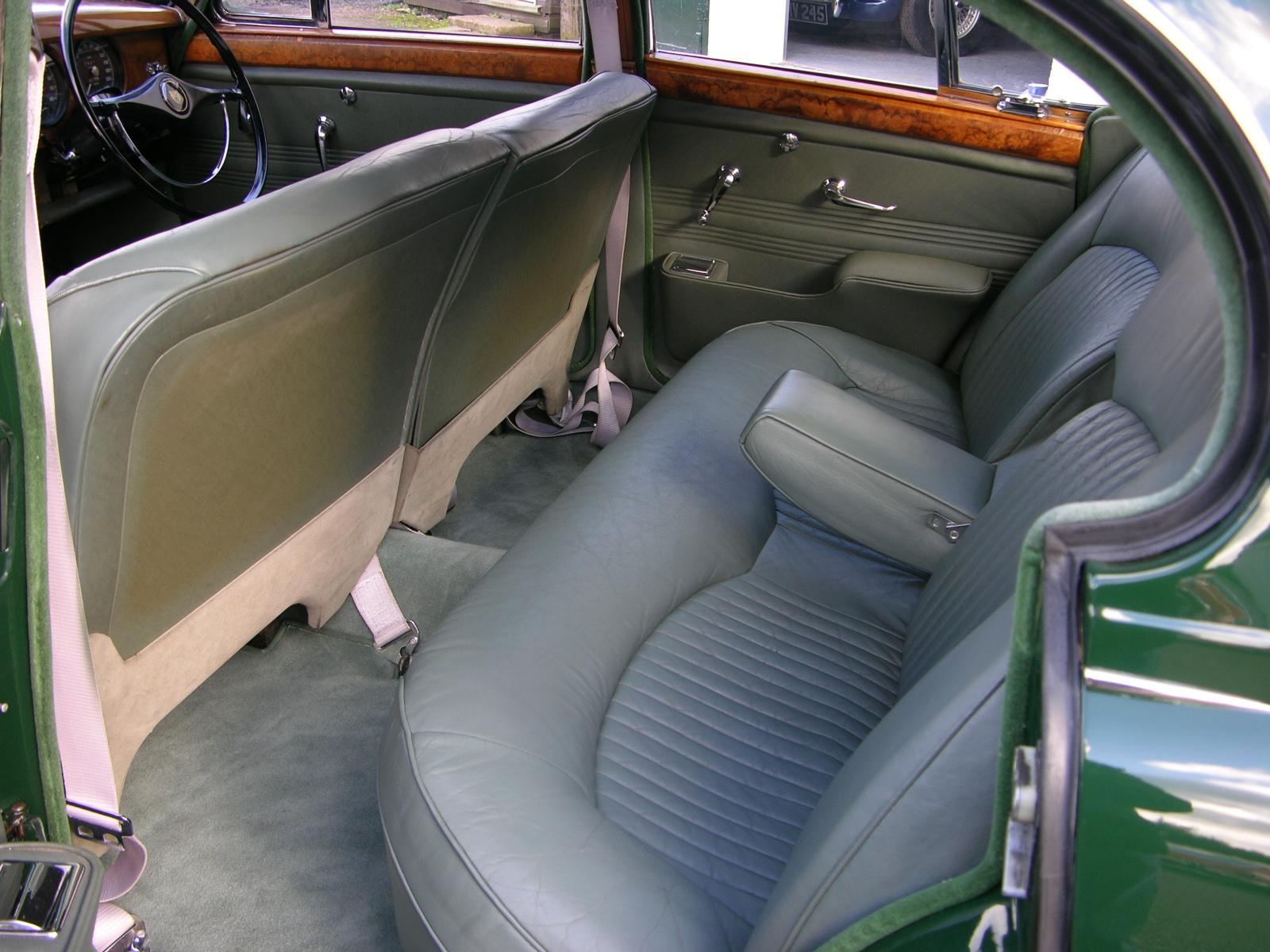

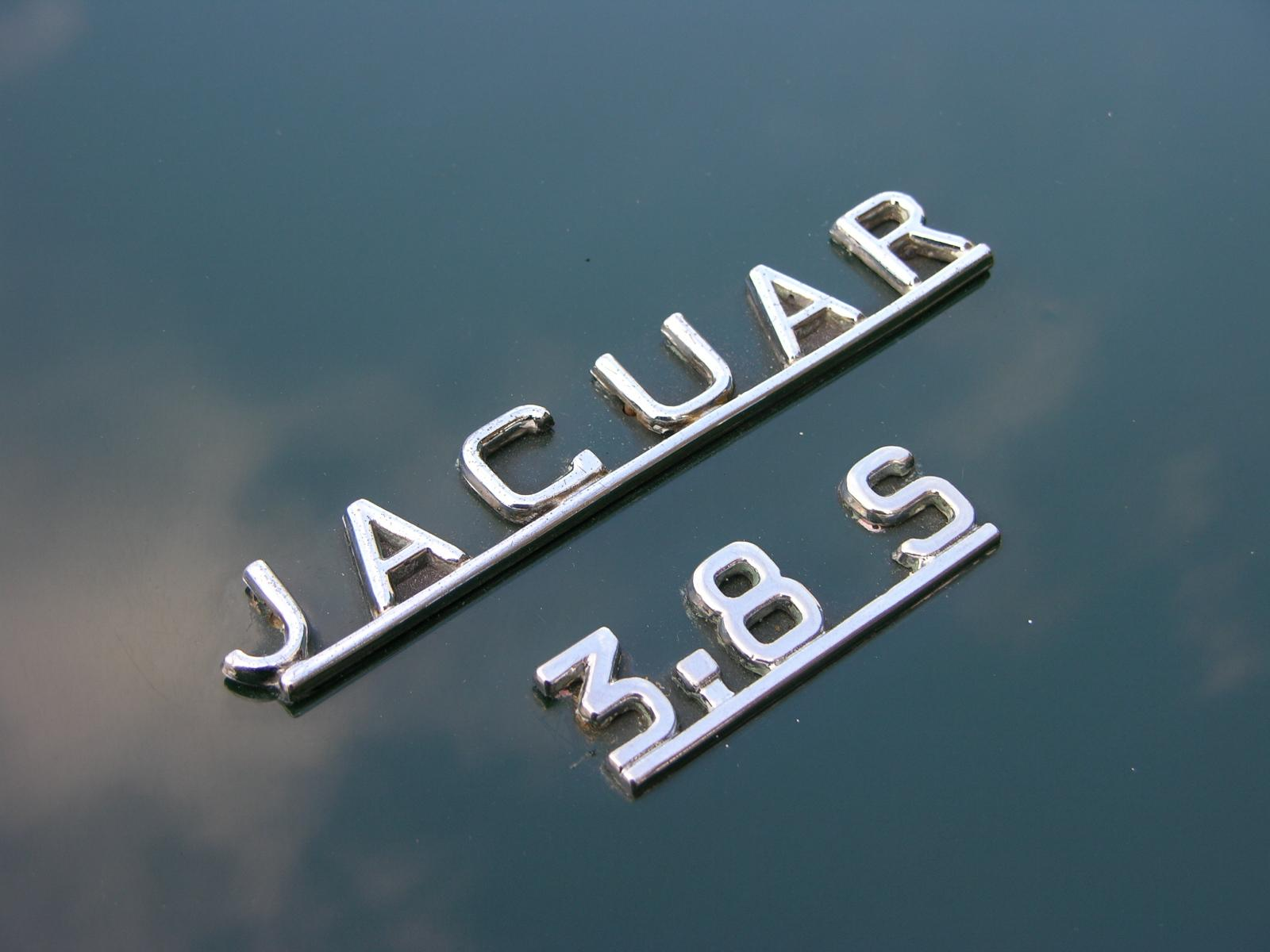

== Performance ==
A contemporary road test by Autosport magazine was typical in describing the "on paper" performance of the 3.8 S-Type as slower than the 3.8-litre Mark 2 but its actual cross-country performance as faster. Despite its extra weight, the S-Type's independent rear suspension allowed it to corner faster than the Mark 2, especially on uneven surfaces. Other benefits ascribed to the rear suspension were better traction and a much smoother ride for rear-seat passengers. Some enthusiasts rued the loss of the Mark 2's "driftability" and noted that the S-Type suffered more body roll during high speed cornering but the consensus was that the S-Type provided significant improvements over the Mark 2 in roadholding, safety and ride comfort.

Car and Driver concluded its test report on a 3.8S with these words, "It can be a convenient family car, a businessman's express, a sports coupe, and a grand tourer. The latter two classifications come particularly clear to anyone who spends much time with the car in the wet, when the sure-footedness of its all independent suspension and the Dunlop RS-5 tyres makes its responsive handling an absolute revelation. The S-Type represents a great step forward for what has always been a fine automobile." The RS-5 cross-ply tyres were soon to be replaced by much better Dunlop SP41 radials, further enhancing the car's handling and grip.

Recorded performance figures obviously differed between testers and gearbox options but for the purposes of comparison, the following contemporary data is typical:

3.4S automatic
0–60 mph 10.0 s
Max speed 118 mph (190 km/h)

3.4S manual/overdrive
0–60 mph 13.9 s
Max speed 115 mph (185 km/h)

3.8S manual/overdrive
0–60 10.2 s
Max speed 122 mph (196 km/h)

3.8S automatic
0–60 mph 11.5 s
Max speed 116 mph (187 km/h)

== Production developments ==
Several significant changes were made to the S-Type's interior and mechanicals during its six years in production.

Of the various performance enhancing mechanical changes, most were applied to both the 3.4S and 3.8S at the same time. These were:

- In June 1964 the original Dunlop RS5 cross-ply tyres were replaced with Dunlop SP41 radials, removing the former's tendency to squeal under hard cornering and providing higher limits of adhesion with more gradual breakaway at the limit.
- In October 1964 the brakes were given a bigger servo, requiring lower pedal pressures.
- Also in October 1964, the Moss four-speed manual gearbox with no synchromesh on first gear was replaced with Jaguar's own all-synchromesh four-speed gearbox. Revised gear ratios improved acceleration and a more compact Laycock A-type overdrive unit was fitted (when the overdrive option was specified)
- A very few of the last S-Types built had the same Marles Varamatic variable ratio power steering that was available on the 420 and 420G.

The only production development not shared by both the 3.4S and 3.8S was that the Powr-Lok limited slip differential option ceased to be available on the 3.4S when the 1967 cost saving trim revisions were introduced.

In 1966 a dashboard switch was provided for the heated rear window, which had previously remained "on" as long as the ignition was on, leading to instances of flat batteries.

== Sales performance ==
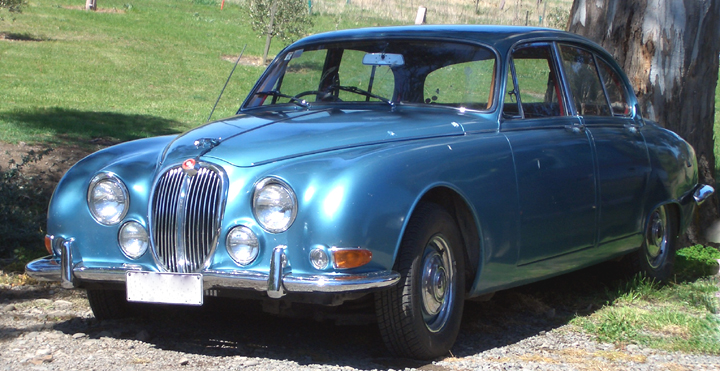
Jaguar 3.4S in factory opalescent silver blue

Though introduced in 1963, only a small number of S-Types was produced in that year. The S-Type did not manage to overtake the Mark 2's production figures until 1965. It repeated the feat in 1966, the year in which the Jaguar 420 and its badge-engineered partner the Daimler Sovereign were introduced. In 1967 the 420/Sovereign outsold both the S-Type and the Mark 2, despite a resurgence in the latter's sales that year. Both the Mark 2 and 420/Sovereign easily outsold the S-Type in 1967 and 1968. Sales of the S-Type in 1968, its last year of production, fell below four figures. Top seller in 1968 was actually the venerable Mark 2, potential buyers of both the S-Type and 420/Sovereign hanging back to wait for the new Jaguar XJ6.

Introduced late in 1968, the Jaguar XJ6 was slightly larger than the S-Type and 420/Sovereign and swept them both from the Jaguar range, with the Mark 2 continuing as the 240/340. The 420G continued to be available until 1970.

Production figures
Year	Number
1963	43
1964	7,032
1965	9,741
1966	6,260
1967	1,008
1968	909

== Specifications ==
Engine	Jaguar 6-cylinder in-line, iron block, alloy head
Capacities	3.4 L (3,442 cc) or 3.8 L (3,781 cc)
Bore/stroke	3.4 L (83 mm x 106 mm) or 3.8 L (87 mm x 106 mm)
Valves	DOHC 2 valves per cylinder
Compression ratio	8:1 (7:1 and 9:1 optional)
Max. power	3.4 L 210 bhp (157 kW; 213 PS) at 5500 rpm or 3.8 L 220 bhp (164 kW; 223 PS) at 5500 rpm
Max. torque	3.4 L 216 lb⋅ft (293 N⋅m) at 3000 rpm or 3.8 L 240 lb⋅ft (325 N⋅m) at 3000 rpm
Carburettors	Twin SU HD6 (1.75 in)
Suspension	Front independent, with wishbones, coil springs, telescopic dampers and anti-roll bar. Rear independent, with lower wishbone and driveshaft as upper link, radius arms, and twin coil springs with telescopic dampers
Steering	Recirculating ball, worm and nut; power assistance optional
Brakes	Servo assisted discs on all four wheels, inboard at rear
Body/chassis	Unitary bodyshell with bolted front subframe, five-seater saloon, front-engine rear-wheel drive
Tyres/wheels	6.40 × 15 crossply or 185 × 15 radial, 5.0in rim, five-stud disc wheels with wire spoke optional
Track front/rear	1,403 mm (55.2 in) / 1,378 mm (54.3 in)

== Scale models ==
- Spot-On models, No. 276 (production 1964), Jaguar S-type, 1:42 scale.
- Neo Scale Models produced a 1:43 resin moulded model of the 3.4 S-Type.
