= Daimler Sovereign =

Daimler Sovereign (1966–1983)
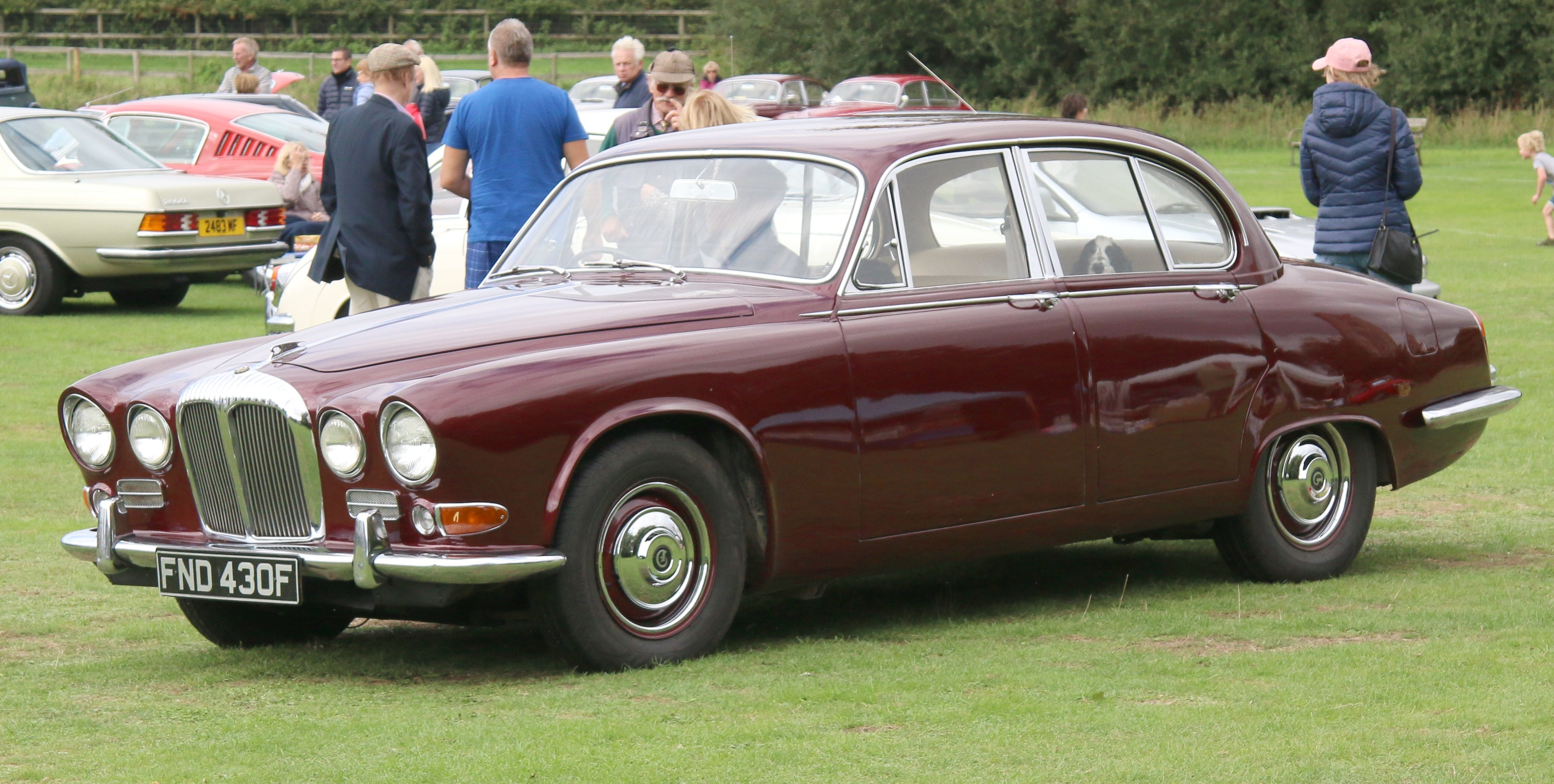
- 1968 Sovereign saloon

Overview
- Manufacturer: Jaguar Cars
- Production: 1966–1983
- Assembly: United Kingdom: Coventry, England

Body and chassis
- Class: Full-size luxury car (F)
- Body style: 4-door notchback saloon 2-door notchback coupé
- Layout: FR layout
- Related: Jaguar 420; Jaguar XJ6

Powertrain
- Transmission: overdrive or automatic options available

Dimensions
- Wheelbase: 107 in (2,718 mm)
- Length: 188 in (4,775 mm)
- Width: 67 in (1,702 mm)
- Height: 55 in (1,397 mm)
- Kerb weight: 3,455 lb (1,567 kg) (manual without overdrive)

Chronology
- Predecessor: Daimler Majestic; Daimler Majestic Major
- Successor: Jaguar Sovereign; Daimler Double Six

Daimler Sovereign was a name applied by British manufacturer Jaguar Cars to a sequence of luxury automobiles built by it but carrying the Daimler badge between 1966 and 1983.

The Daimler Sovereigns were based on contemporary Jaguar bodyshells, chassis and engines in an example of badge engineering. Jaguar Cars took over The Daimler Company in 1960 and the 1966 Sovereign was the second Daimler to be based on a Jaguar model. The first was the 2½ litre V8 with an engine designed by Edward Turner. Unlike the Daimler 2½ litre, the Sovereign had a Jaguar engine, marking the end for the Turner designed engines.

The first Daimler Sovereign was based on the 1966 Jaguar 420 and is sometimes referred to as the "Sovereign 420". Subsequent Sovereigns were derived from the Series I, II and III Jaguar XJ6. In 1983 the model name "Sovereign" was switched to the high specification version of the Series III Jaguar XJ6, the 6-cylinder Daimler based on it simply continuing without a model name.

The V12 versions of the Daimler, available from 1972 to 1997, were named Daimler Double-Six after the original Daimler V12s.

== Sovereign (Jaguar 420 based: 1966–1969) ==
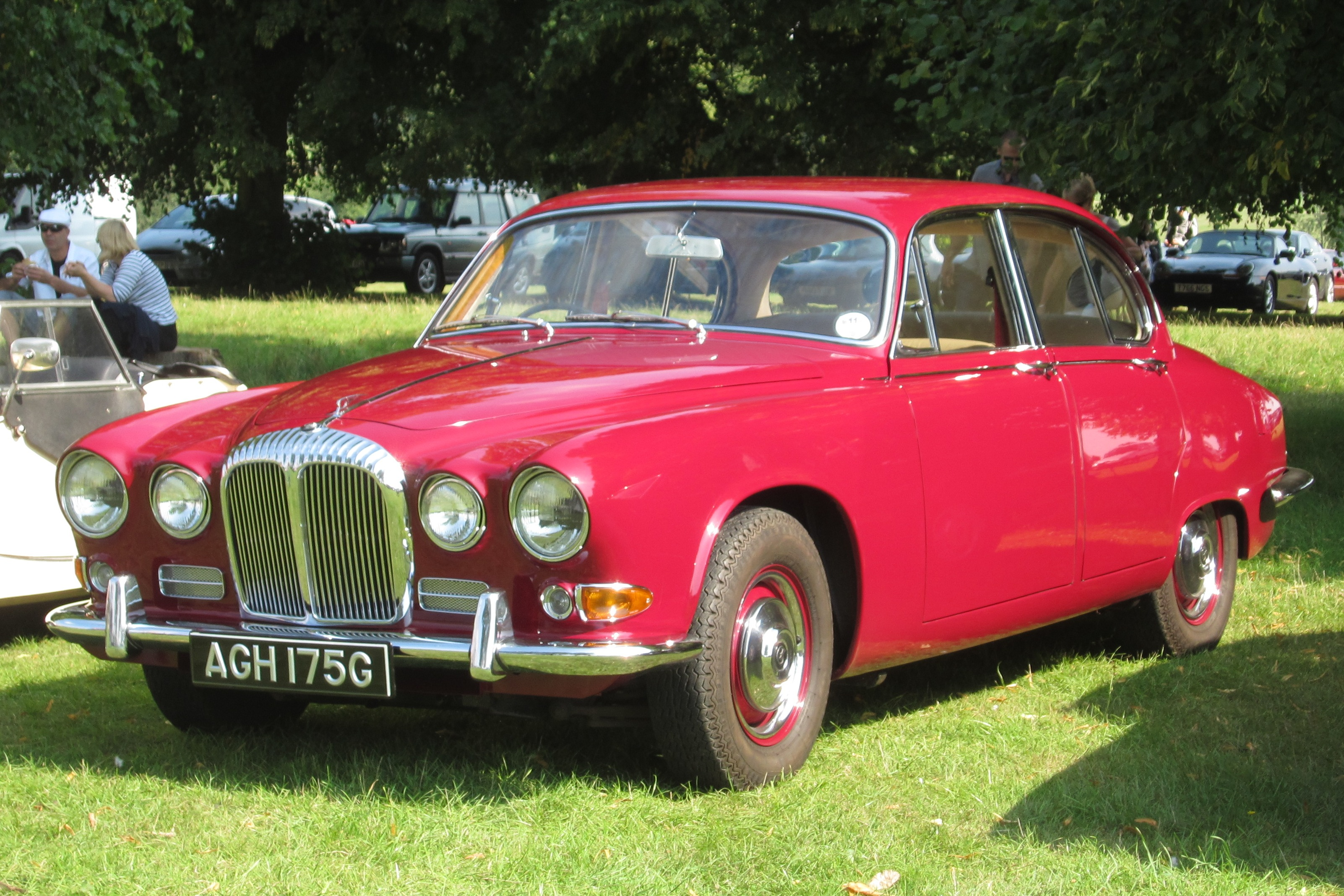
1969 Sovereign

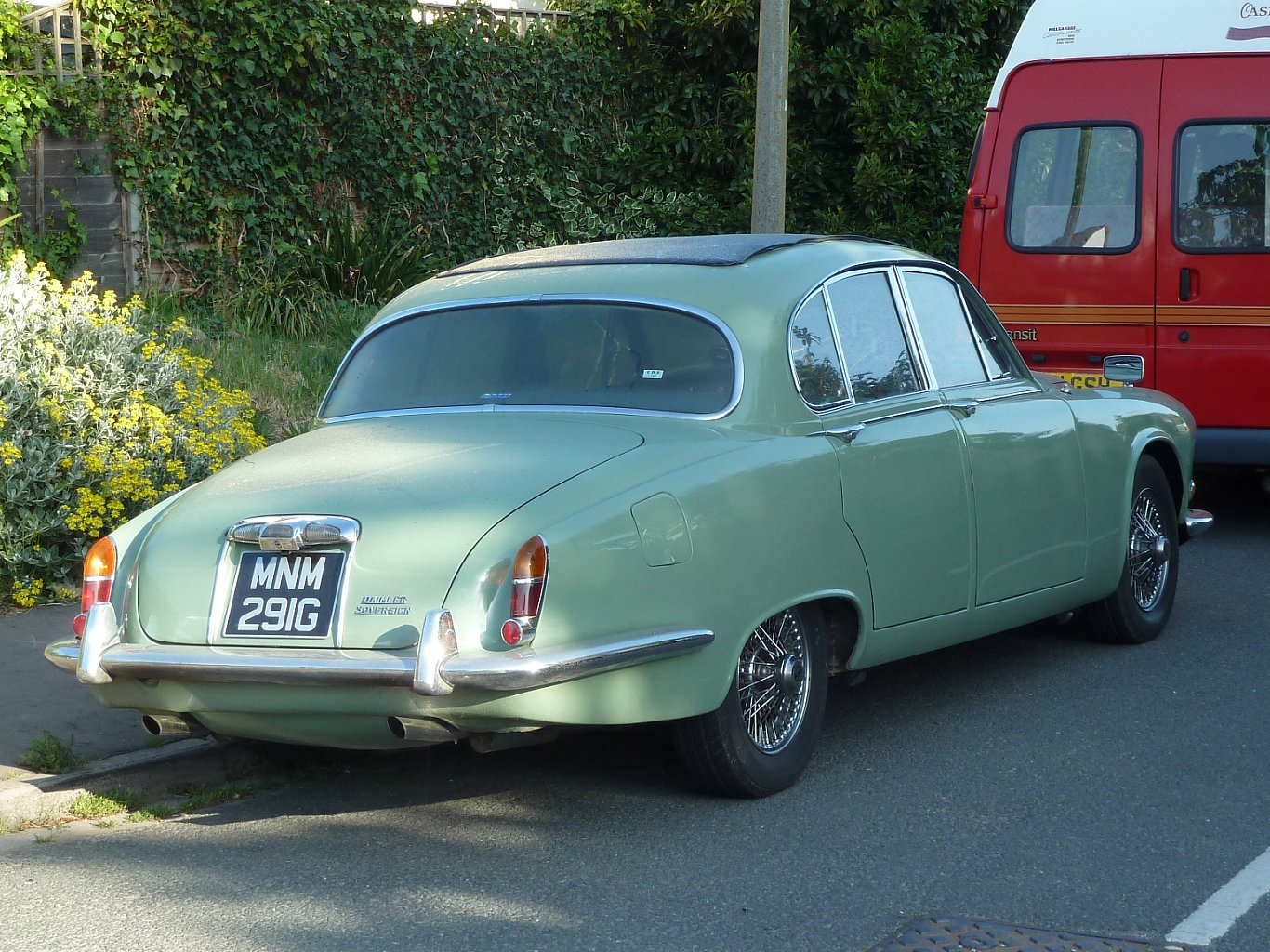
1969 Sovereign (rear view)

The first Sovereign was a badge-engineered version of the Jaguar 420 saloon, which was itself based on the Jaguar S-Type.

The 420 and Sovereign differed from the S-Type in having a revised four-headlight nose reminiscent of the Jaguar Mark X, and being powered by a 4.2-litre version of the straight-six XK engine. The main external difference between the 420 and Sovereign was the traditional fluted radiator grille on the Daimler. More detail of the development of the 420/Sovereign and the ways in which the Sovereign differed from its Jaguar stablemate can be found in the article on the Jaguar 420 and Daimler Sovereign.

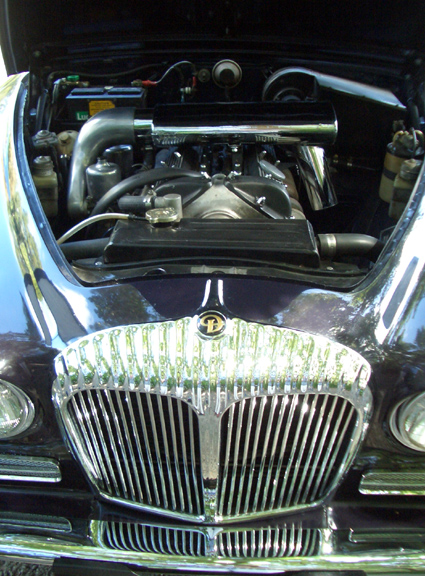
Sovereign engine bay

There were thoughts of fitting the Sovereign with the Daimler 4½ litre V8 engine as used in the Majestic Major but as this significantly outperformed the Jaguar XK unit and would have led to the Sovereign outgunning the Jaguar 420 the Jaguar hierarchy did not pursue the idea; the Jaguar marque was supposed to be more sporty than the Daimler.

In 1967 the final drive ratio was quietly changed from 3.31:1 to 3.54:1 which led to press complaints about fussier high speed cruising but which improved acceleration times from stand-still within the range of the speeds legal in Britain following the introduction, in December 1965, of a blanket 70 mph (113 km/h) speed limit across the nation's highways.

The front-end styling of the Daimler DS420 limousine introduced in 1968 shared a family resemblance with a Daimler grille mated to a four headlight nose.

The 420/Sovereign range began to be replaced by the Jaguar XJ6 in September 1968. The Jaguar ceased production in December 1968, the Daimler remaining in production until July 1969.

== Sovereign (Jaguar XJ6 based: 1969–1983) ==
=== Series I (1969–1973) ===
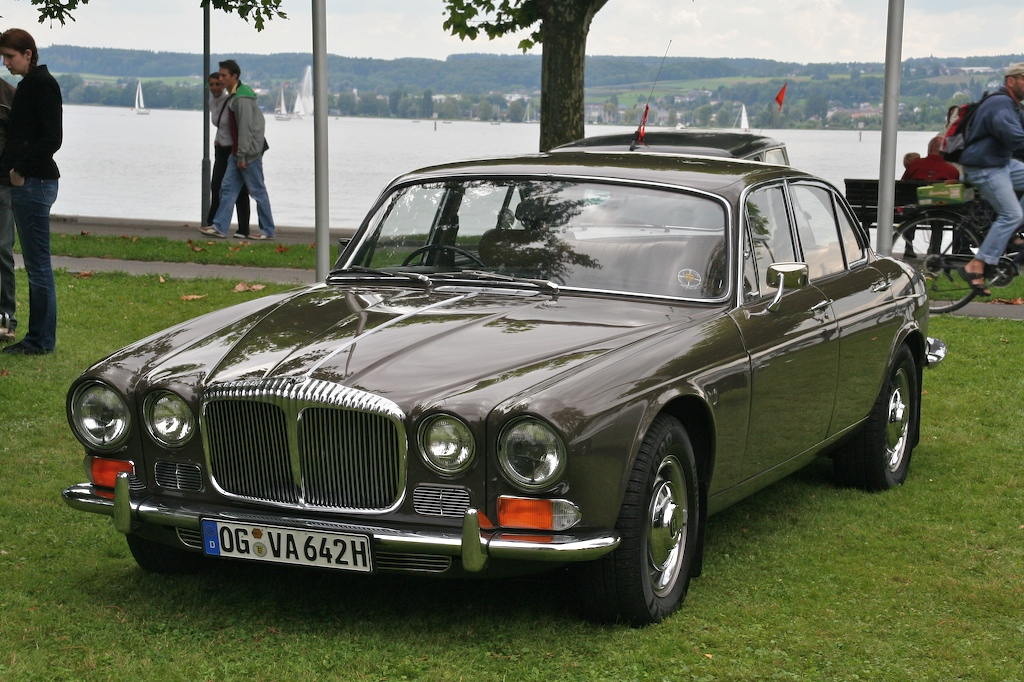
1972 Daimler Sovereign (Series I)

A new Series I XJ6-based Sovereign was introduced in October 1969. Once again, it was externally virtually identical to its Jaguar source car with the exception of its fluted grille and Daimler badging. Internally there were trim variations, such as the deletion of the wood door cappings fitted to the Jaguar. This Sovereign was offered with either the 2.8-litre or the 4.2-litre version of the XK engine.

=== Series II (1973–1979) ===
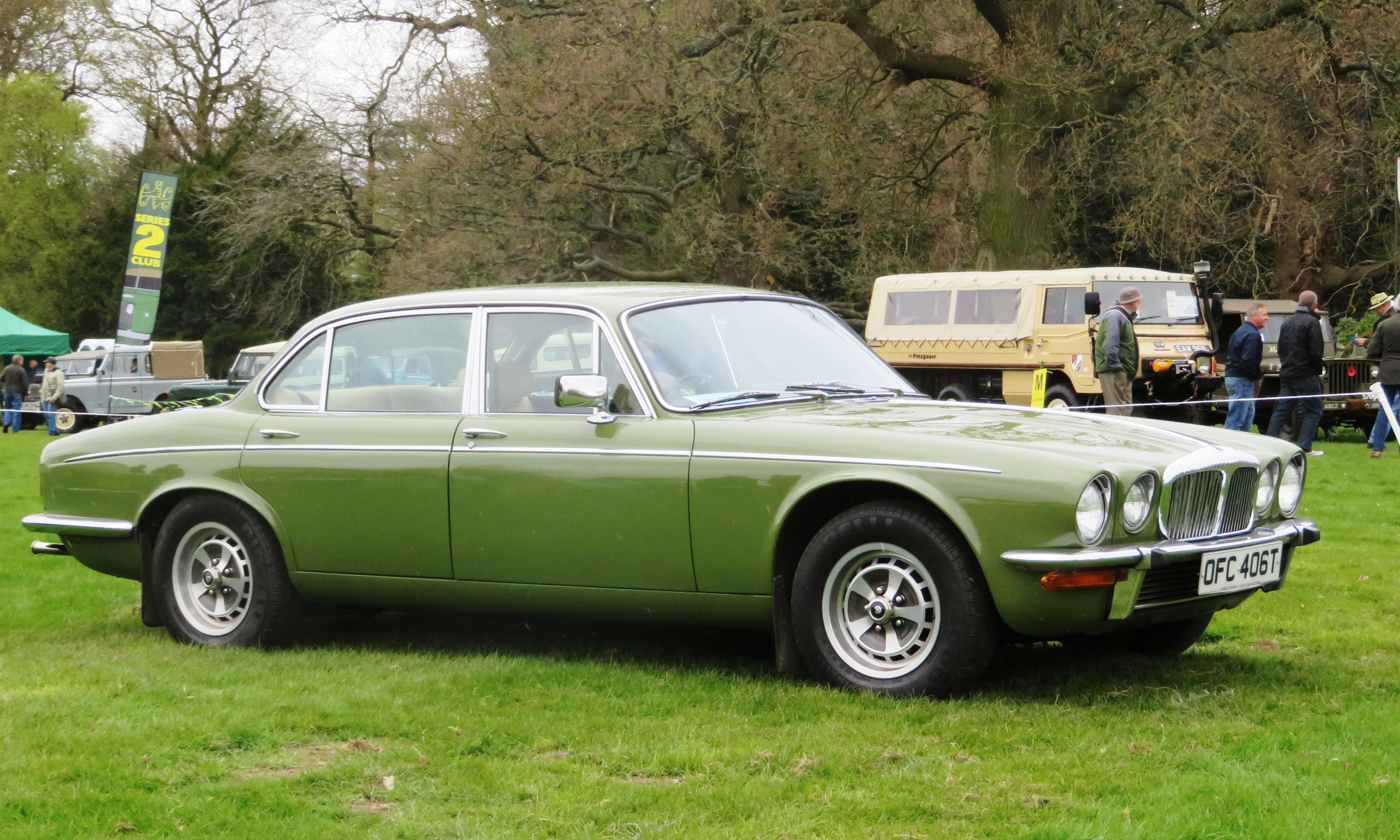
1978 Daimler Sovereign (Series II)

The Daimler Sovereign name remained in use for the Series II version of the XJ6, with a raised front bumper and shallower grille; an extended wheelbase version was introduced, which eventually became the standard model. From 1975 the 2.8-litre was replaced by a 3.4-litre version of the XK engine.

=== Series III (1979–1983) ===
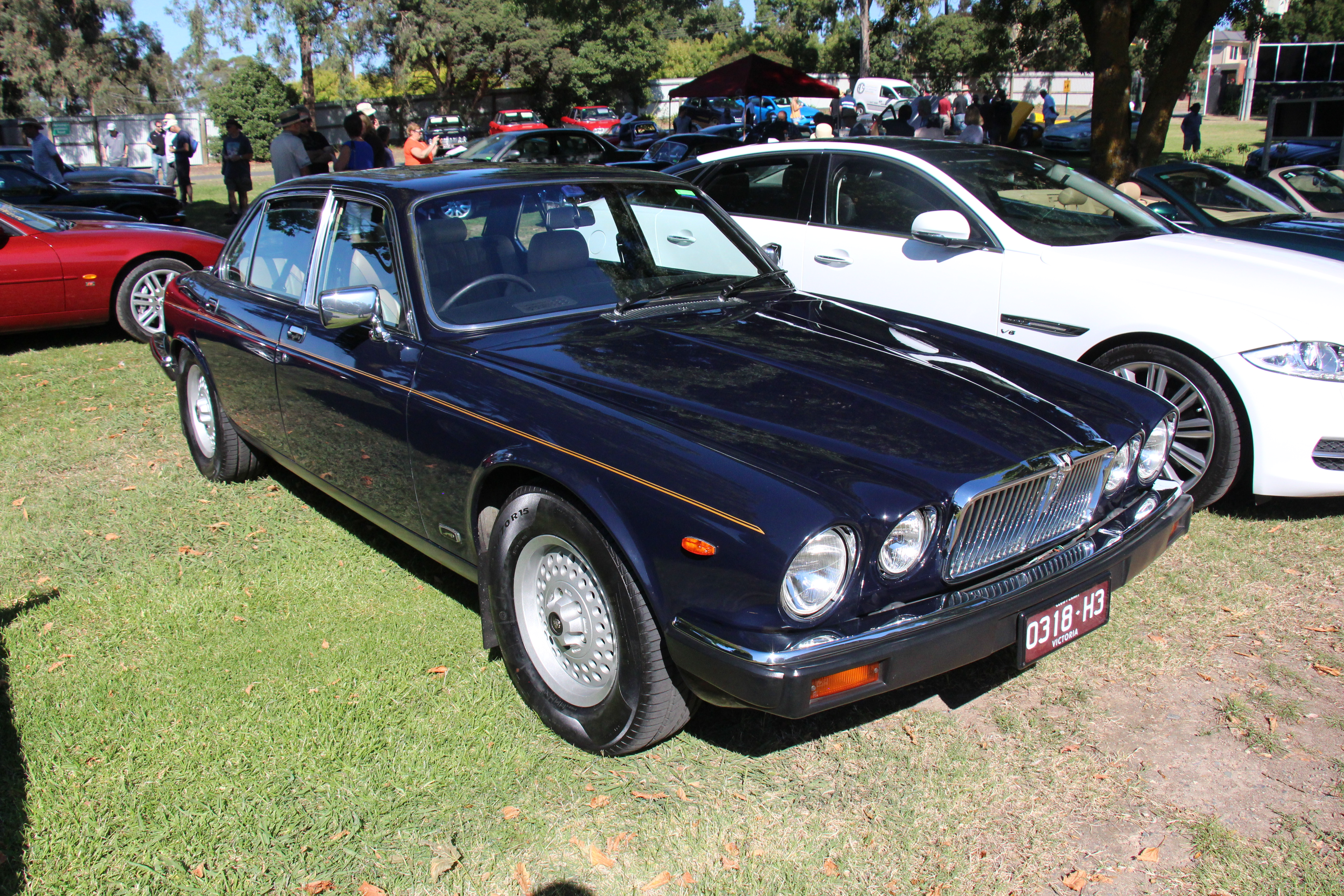
1981 Daimler Sovereign (Series III)

The Series III XJ6 range, which was released in 1979, was visually distinguished from the Series II by its new thicker bumpers, the removal of separate "quarter-light" windows from the front doors, and a revised rear roofline featuring a slightly more angular c-pillar. The Series III range initially continued to include a Daimler Sovereign, but in 1983, during the run of the Series III, the range was renamed with the base model named the Jaguar XJ6, the more luxurious version named the Jaguar Sovereign, and the top-of-the-range simply known as the Daimler, without a model name. Some top-of-the-range versions were given the Vanden Plas designation; in some markets where there were licensing problems in the use of the Daimler name, cars with the Daimler fluted grille were sold as Jaguar Vanden Plas.

== Sovereign 4.2 two door (1975–1978) ==
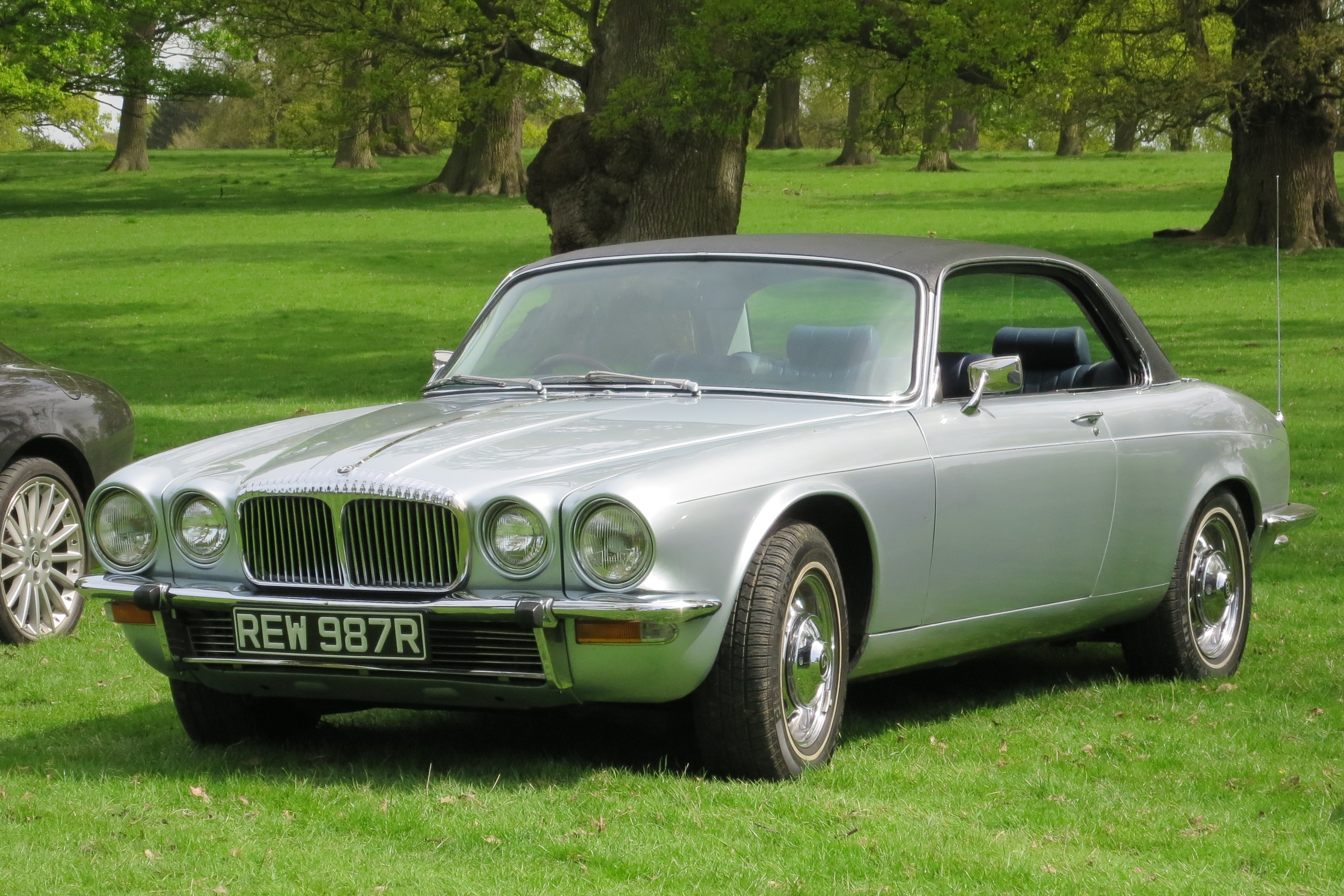
1976 Sovereign coupé

A two-door coupe variant of the Sovereign Series II, utilising the shorter wheelbase platform, was offered from 1975 to 1977. It was marketed as the Daimler Sovereign 4.2 two door.

== Daimler Double-Six (1972–1997) ==
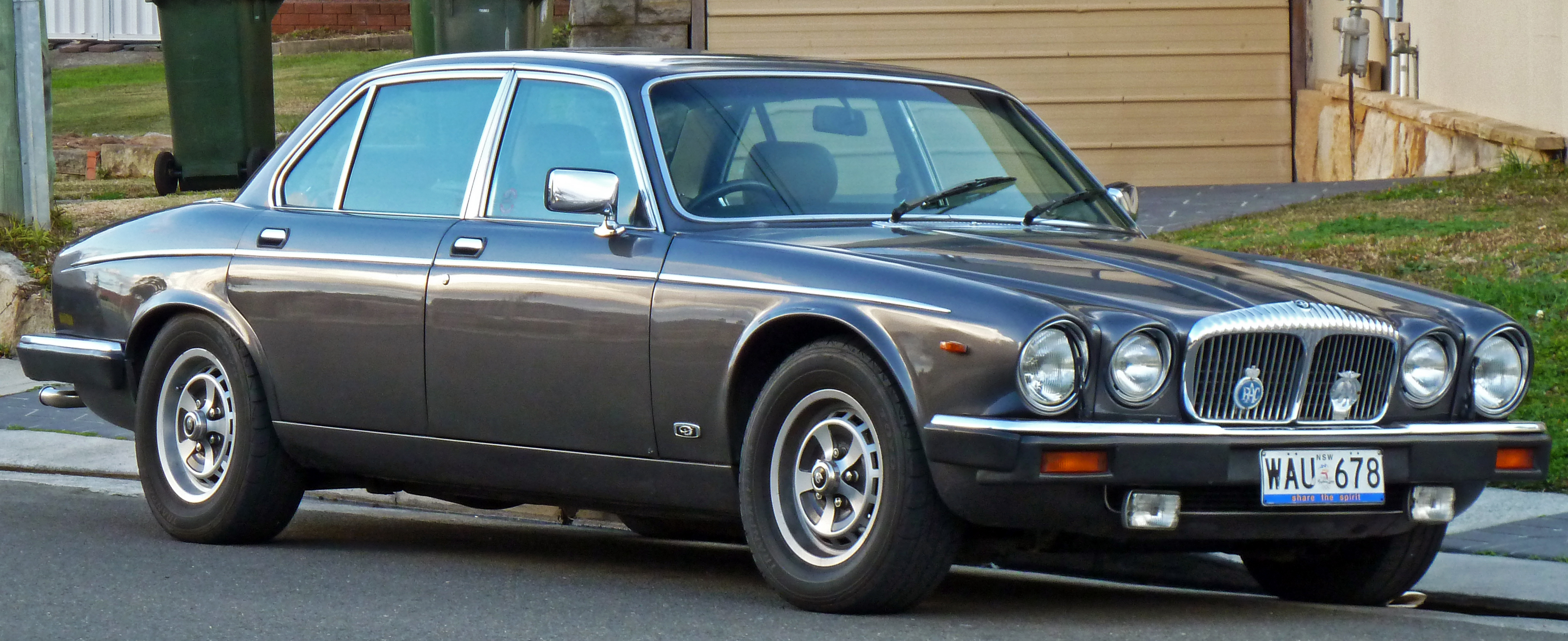
1987 Double-Six saloon

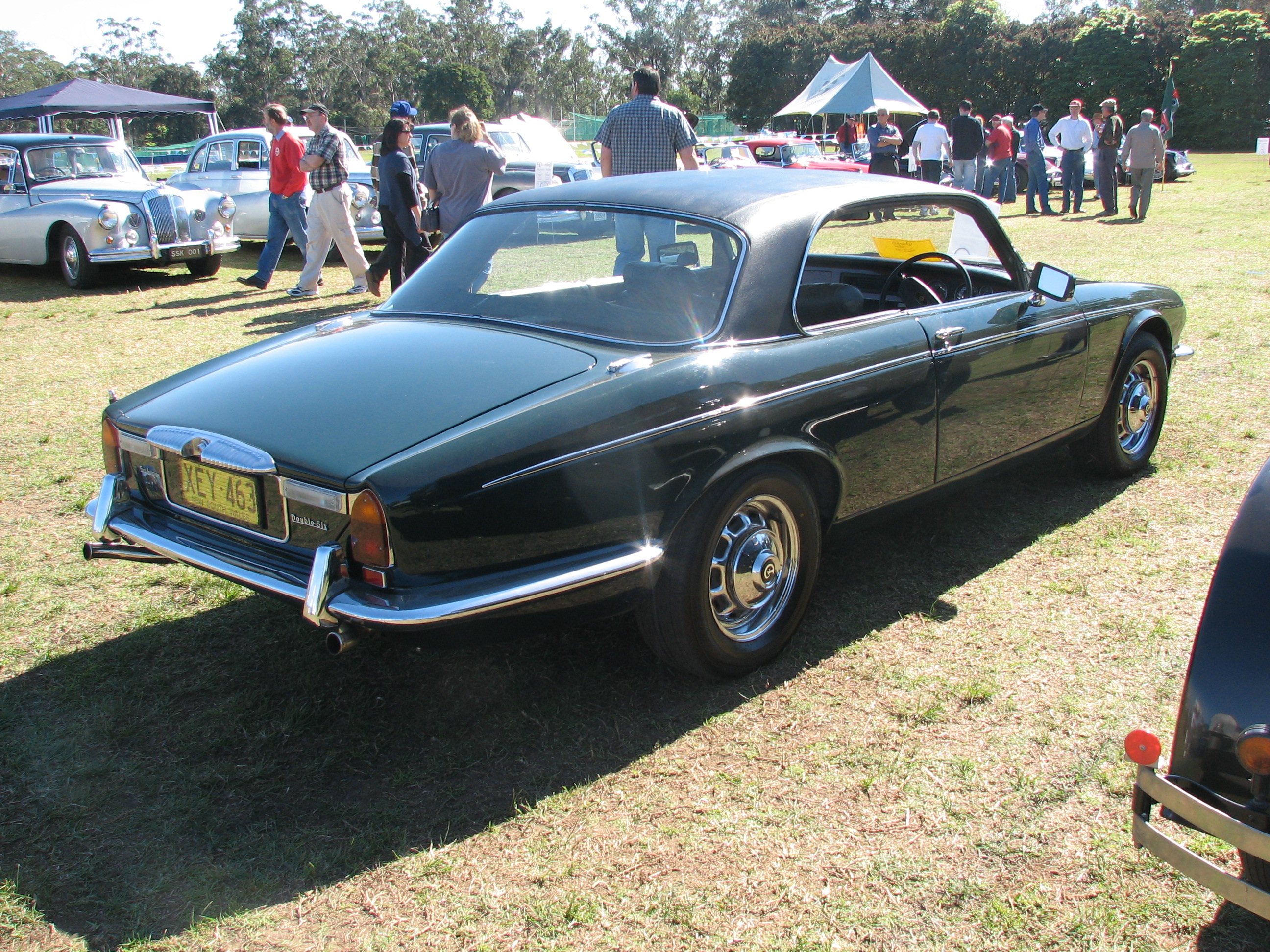
1975 Double-Six coupé

From 1972 Jaguar's 5.3-litre V12 engine was available in the XJ range, and for the Daimler version a name used by the company from 1926 to 1938 was revived. Sir William Lyons had retired from Jaguar in 1972 and the new chairman was FRW (Lofty) England. Lofty England had been a Daimler apprentice from 1927 to 1932 and taken second place in the first ever RAC rally driving a 30/40 hp Daimler Double-Six and so he decreed that the new V12 Daimler would be known as Double-Six.

Unlike the Jaguar, the twelve-cylinder Daimler had the same radiator grille as its six-cylinder sibling, and externally only the badges distinguished them. The Double-Six followed the same changes as the Sovereign from Series I to Series III, although the Sovereign name was transferred to Jaguar, the Double-Six name remained with Daimler throughout Series III production, which continued until 1992.

In late 1972, the particularly well-equipped Double-Six Vanden Plas appeared. On a 4 inches (100 mm) longer wheelbase, this model also received a black vinyl roof to set it apart.

A two-door notchback coupé (aka two-door saloon) was offered in the Double-Six Series II range from 1975 to 1977, as an addition to the four-door notchback saloon. It was marketed as the Daimler Double-Six two door.

When Jaguar re-engineered the XJ40 (the successor to the Series III) to take a 6.0-litre version of the V12 engine, under the model designation XJ81, a new Double-Six was also produced, being manufactured between 1993 and 1994. In the latter year, along with the other XJ models, it was facelifted under the X305 designation and continued to be produced until the V12 engine was dropped in 1997.

== Scale models ==
- The Daimler Sovereign Series 1 has been modelled by Lledo Vanguards in the 2000s.
- The Daimler Sovereign Series 2 has also been modelled by Lledo Vanguards, due for release in the Winter of 2019/2020
- Neo Scale Models have produced a 1:43 resin molded model of the Daimler Vanden Plas Series III.
- At the end of 2012 Neo Scale Models issued a 1:43 resin molded model of the Sovereign 420 in dark red.
