= Vaumol =

Method of colouring leather hide

Vaumol (abbreviated 'VM') is a trademark name for a method of colouring leather hide used by Connolly Leather until the mid-1980s. It was used chiefly for manufacturing leather upholstery for high class British automobiles of the era such as Rolls-Royce and Daimler.

Vaumol used a two layer colour coat consisting of a first layer of cellulose based colour spread over the stretched hide, followed by a second layer applied with a spraygun. Vaumol had a distinctive aroma as a result of the organic compound used in the tanning process, which was "a cocktail of extracts from mimosa bark, quebracho wood and myrobalan (Terminalia chebula), an Indian nut".

Environmental considerations meant that it was supplanted in 1985 by a half water based process until about 1994, when it switched to a fully water based process. Post Vaumol leathers produced by Connolly are considered by some experts to be of inferior quality.

An identifying feature of Vaumol is that it has two colours; the main colour and black. The black colour can be seen in the pores of the grain, which is sometimes mistaken for dirt trapped in the grain.
