= ALS (disambiguation) =

ALS, or amyotrophic lateral sclerosis, is a rare neurodegenerative disease.

ALS, als, Als, or ALs may also refer to:

== Places ==
- Als (island), Denmark

== Aviation ==
- Airman Leadership School, a U.S. Air Force program
- ALS – Aircraft Leasing Services, a Kenyan airline
- Approach lighting system, an airport runway lighting system
- San Luis Valley Regional Airport (IATA code: ALS)

== Medicine ==
- Advanced life support, a level of medical training
- Anterolateral system, a part of the nervous system
- Antibodies from lymphocyte secretions, an immunological assay
- Angular leaf spot, a bacterial plant disease

== Science and technology ==
- Acetolactate synthase, an enzyme
- Advanced Light Source, a synchrotron radiation facility
- ALSN, or automatic train signalling (автоматична локомотивна сигналізація), a train protection system
- Alternate line service, a mobile phone feature
- Aluminized steel, as used in engineering drawings
- Ammonium lauryl sulfate, a household chemical
- Antilag system, a system used on turbocharged engines
- Audio Lossless Coding, an audio codec
- Advanced low-power Schottky, a type of transistor–transistor logic
- Photodetector, ambient light sensor
- Alternating least squares, a matrix factorization method

== Organizations ==
- Als, a nickname used for the Montreal Alouettes of the Canadian Football League
- ALS Association, an American nonprofit organization
- American Littoral Society, an American environmental organization
- Antar Lintas Sumatera, an Indonesian intercity bus company
- Arrowhead Library System (Wisconsin), American public libraries
- Australian Linguistic Society, an Australian academic association
- Associated London Scripts, a comedy-writers collective founded by Spike Milligan

== Other uses ==
- ALS Gold Medal, a literary prize awarded by the Association for the Study of Australian Literature
- A. Lange & Söhne, a German luxury watch brand
- Alternative Learning System (Philippines), a modular non-formal education program
- Associate of the Linnean Society of London, a learned society for the study and dissemination of taxonomy and natural history
- "Auld Lang Syne", a traditional Scottish folk song
- Autographed Letter Signed, a term used in autograph colleting
- Singapore Area Licensing Scheme, a road pricing scheme in Singapore
- Tosk Albanian language (ISO 639-3 code: als)
