= Iron monoboride =

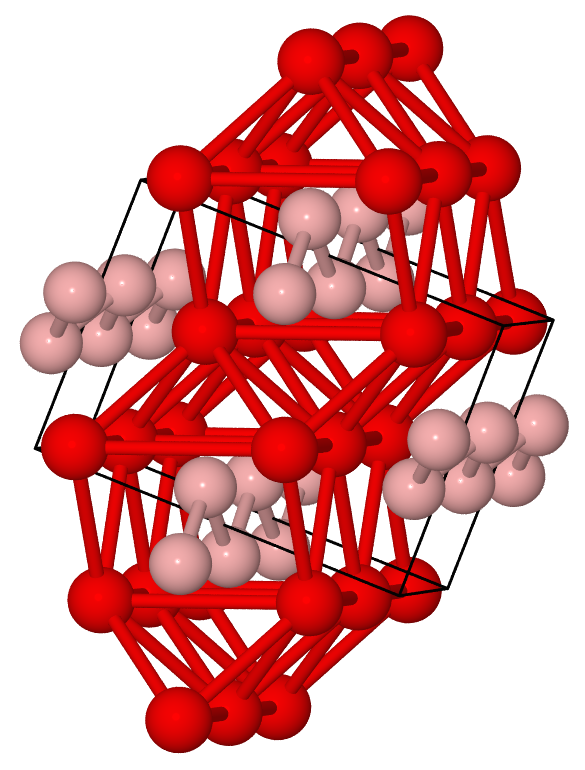

Names
- IUPAC name Iron boride

Identifiers
CAS Number	12006-84-7
3D model (JSmol)	Interactive image
ChemSpider	74711
ECHA InfoCard	100.031.341
EC Number	234-489-9
PubChem CID	82789
CompTox Dashboard (EPA)	DTXSID9065154
- InChI: InChI=1S/B.Fe Key: ZDVYABSQRRRIOJ-UHFFFAOYSA-N
- SMILES: [B].[Fe]

Properties
Chemical formula	FeB
Molar mass	66.656 g/mol
Appearance	Grey powder
Density	~7 g/cm^{3}
Melting point	1,658 °C (3,016 °F; 1,931 K)
Solubility in water	Insoluble in water

Structure
Crystal structure	Orthorhombic, oP8
Space group	Pnma, No. 62
Lattice constant	a = 0.4061 nm, b = 0.5506 nm, c = 0.2952 nm
Formula units (Z)	4
- Except where otherwise noted, data are given for materials in their standard state (at 25 °C [77 °F], 100 kPa). Infobox references

Iron monoboride is an inorganic compound of iron and boron with the chemical formula FeB. It is a hard, brittle, grey solid and one of the principal binary iron borides.

== Structure and properties ==
Iron monoboride crystallizes in the orthorhombic crystal system in space group Pnma (No. 62), with four formula units per unit cell. Representative lattice parameters are a = 4.061 Å, b = 5.506 Å and c = 2.952 Å.

The structure contains infinite zigzag chains of boron atoms. Each boron atom is coordinated by seven iron atoms in a slightly distorted monocapped trigonal-prismatic arrangement and has two neighbouring boron atoms. The B–B distance is about 178 pm, while Fe–B distances are approximately 215–220 pm and Fe–Fe distances are about 240–272 pm. Adjacent boron-centred trigonal prisms share rectangular faces, producing infinite columns through the crystal structure.

FeB is a soft ferromagnetic material at room temperature and becomes paramagnetic above its Curie temperature of about 325 °C (598 K).

Single crystals of FeB show pronounced magnetocrystalline anisotropy. The principal magnetic domains are arranged parallel to the axis of easy magnetization and perpendicular to the axis of hard magnetization. On the (010) crystal face, band-like and zigzag magnetic domains occur together with smaller rhombic closure domains. The resulting pattern has been described as rows and zigzags of asterisk-like features. The principal domain boundaries are preferentially oriented along the [001] crystallographic direction.

FeB is very hard, with reported Vickers hardness values of approximately 15–22 GPa, but it is also brittle. As a result, FeB-rich layers formed during boriding can be susceptible to cracking and spalling and are generally less desirable than tougher Fe_{2}B-rich layers.

Powdered FeB begins to oxidize in air at temperatures around 300 °C. Bulk material is more resistant to oxidation because of its lower surface area.

== Preparation ==
Iron monoboride can be prepared by direct reaction of iron with boron at high temperature:

Fe + B → FeB

It can also be obtained by reduction of iron compounds in the presence of boron-containing reagents.

A nanoscale iron boride material can be prepared by reacting lithium borohydride with iron(II) bromide in a high-boiling ether solvent. The initially formed product is an ultrafine, pyrophoric, X-ray-amorphous material that nevertheless shows local FeB-type ordering.

On annealing at about 450 °C, this amorphous product develops a more distinct FeB-like structure. Further heating to about 1050 °C produces crystalline α-FeB, while heating to still higher temperatures converts it into β-FeB.
