= Ferroboron =

Alloy of boron and iron

Ferroboron (FeB) is a ferroalloy consisting of iron and boron. The metal usually contains 17.5% to 20% boron and is used to produce boron steels.

== Description ==
Ferroboron (CAS Registry Number 11108–67-1) is a ferroalloy of iron and boron with boron content between 17.5 and 20%.

It is manufactured either by carbothermic reduction of boric acid in an electric arc furnace together with carbon steel, or by the aluminothermic reduction of boric acid in the presence of iron.

Ferroboron is added to C-Mn and other low-alloy steels to improve hardenability (see boron steel), and can also act as a nitrogen scavenger in steel, and in the production of Neodymium magnets.

== See also ==
- Iron boride
- Boriding
