= Jaguar XJ (X350) =

British saloon car (2002–2009)

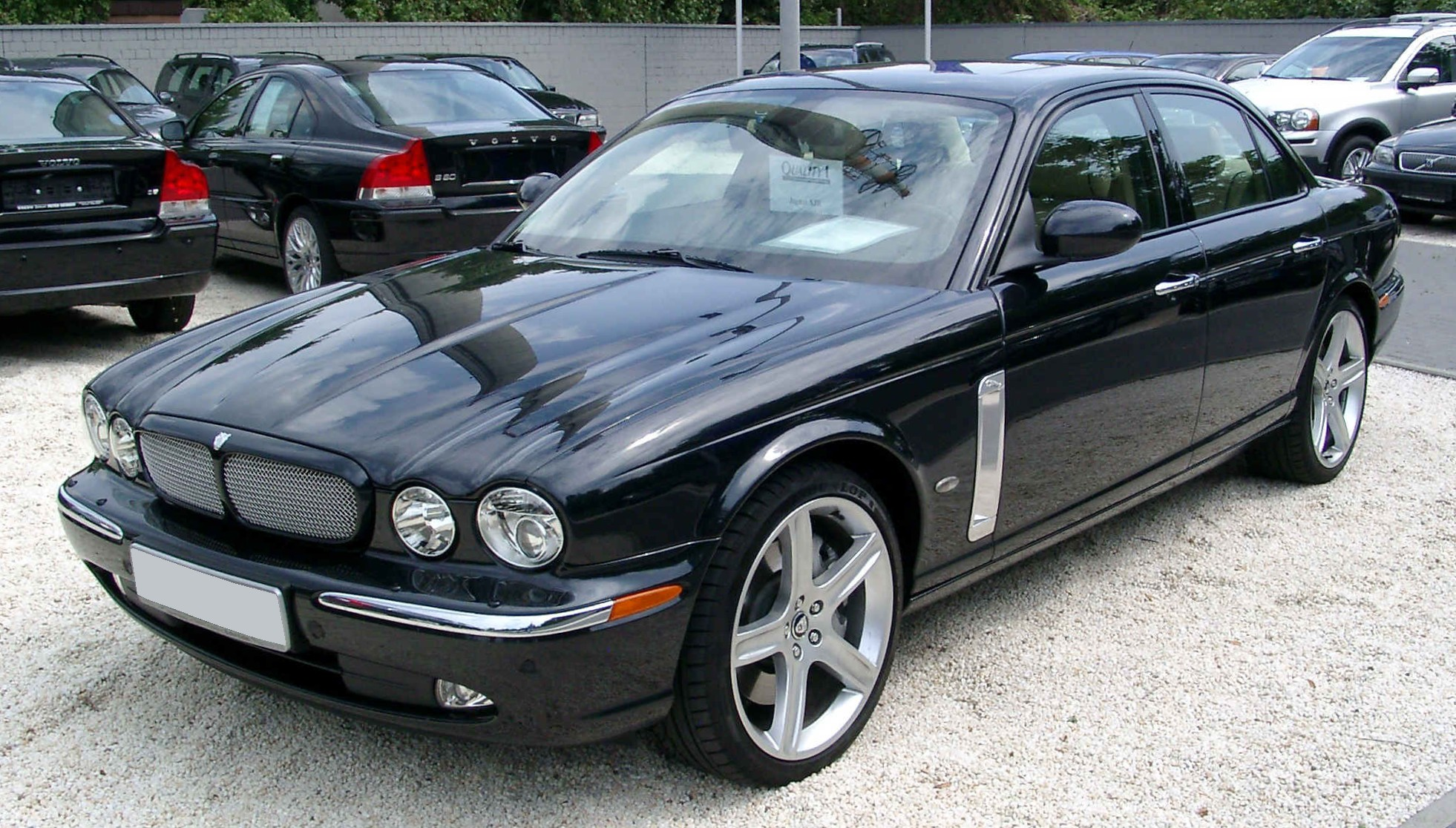
- Special edition of the Jaguar XJR, 2008

Overview
- Manufacturer: Jaguar Cars
- Model code: X350 (2002–2005); X356 (2005–2008); X358 (2008–2009)
- Also called: Jaguar XJ6, Jaguar XJ8, Jaguar Vanden Plas, Jaguar XJR, Jaguar XJ Super V8, Daimler Super Eight
- Production: September 2002 – March 2009; 83,556 produced
- Model years: 2003–2009
- Assembly: United Kingdom: Coventry (Browns Lane Assembly); Birmingham (Castle Bromwich Assembly)
- Designer: Exterior: Tom Owen with Sandy Boyes (1998, 1999); Interior: Giles Taylor; Geoff Lawson (design director, 1997–1999)

Body and chassis
- Class: Full-size luxury car (F)
- Body style: 4-door saloon
- Layout: Front-engine, rear-wheel-drive
- Related: Jaguar XK (X150)

Powertrain
- Engine: Petrol 3.0 L AJ30 V6; 3.5 L AJ-V8 V8; 4.2 L AJ34 V8; 4.2 L AJ34S supercharged V8; Diesel 2.7 L Ford AJD V6
- Transmission: 6-speed 6HP26 automatic

Dimensions
- Wheelbase: SWB: 3,033 mm (119.4 in); LWB: 3,160 mm (124.4 in)
- Length: SWB: 5,090 mm (200.4 in); LWB: 5,215 mm (205.3 in)
- Width: 2004–2005: 1,859 mm (73.2 in)
- Height: SWB: 1,448 mm (57 in); LWB: 1,455 mm (57.3 in)
- Kerb weight: 1,790 kg (3,946 lb)

Chronology
- Predecessor: Jaguar XJ (X308)
- Successor: Jaguar XJ (X351)

The Jaguar XJ (X350) is a full-size four-door luxury saloon car manufactured and marketed worldwide by Jaguar Cars for model years 2003–2009 as the third generation of the Jaguar XJ saloon, carrying the internal designation X350 and the internal designation X358 following its 2007 intermediate facelift. Both the X350 and X358 were available with a six-speed automatic transmission, a range of petrol and diesel engines (V6, V8, and supercharged V8), numerous trim levels, and short wheelbase (2003–2009) or long wheelbase (2005–2009) car body configurations. The extended-length model was the longest saloon Jaguar had manufactured, eclipsing the 1961–1970 Mark X, though the latter is still 3 inches (8 cm) wider.

The X350 was noted for its advanced electrical systems, self-leveling, adaptive air suspension, and full aluminium unibody chassis and bodywork, among the first for a mass-produced automobile. The bodyshell (body in white) was 40 per cent lighter and 50 percent stiffer than its predecessor, despite its increased overall size.

Styling was a conservative evolution of the previous XJ's styling, and its slatted grille recalled that of the original 1968 XJ Series I. Exterior styling was by principal designer Tom Owen, along with Sandy Boyes, under the design directorship of Geoff Lawson, who died midway through the project, and his successor Ian Callum. The XJ's interior was styled by Giles Taylor.

The XJ was manufactured at Jaguar's Browns Lane plant in Coventry and was the final Jaguar to be produced there. With an unpainted and highly polished example of its all-alloy body shell on display, the X350 debuted at the 2002 Paris Motor Show. The full X350/358 generation largely coincided with Jaguar's ownership by Ford's Premier Automotive Group until Tata Motors purchased Jaguar in 2008. Production ended in March 2009 after seven years, with a total production of 83,566.

While it was generally well received and profitable, sales were less than Jaguar had expected. It was followed by the XJ X351.

== X350 ==
=== Body and chassis ===
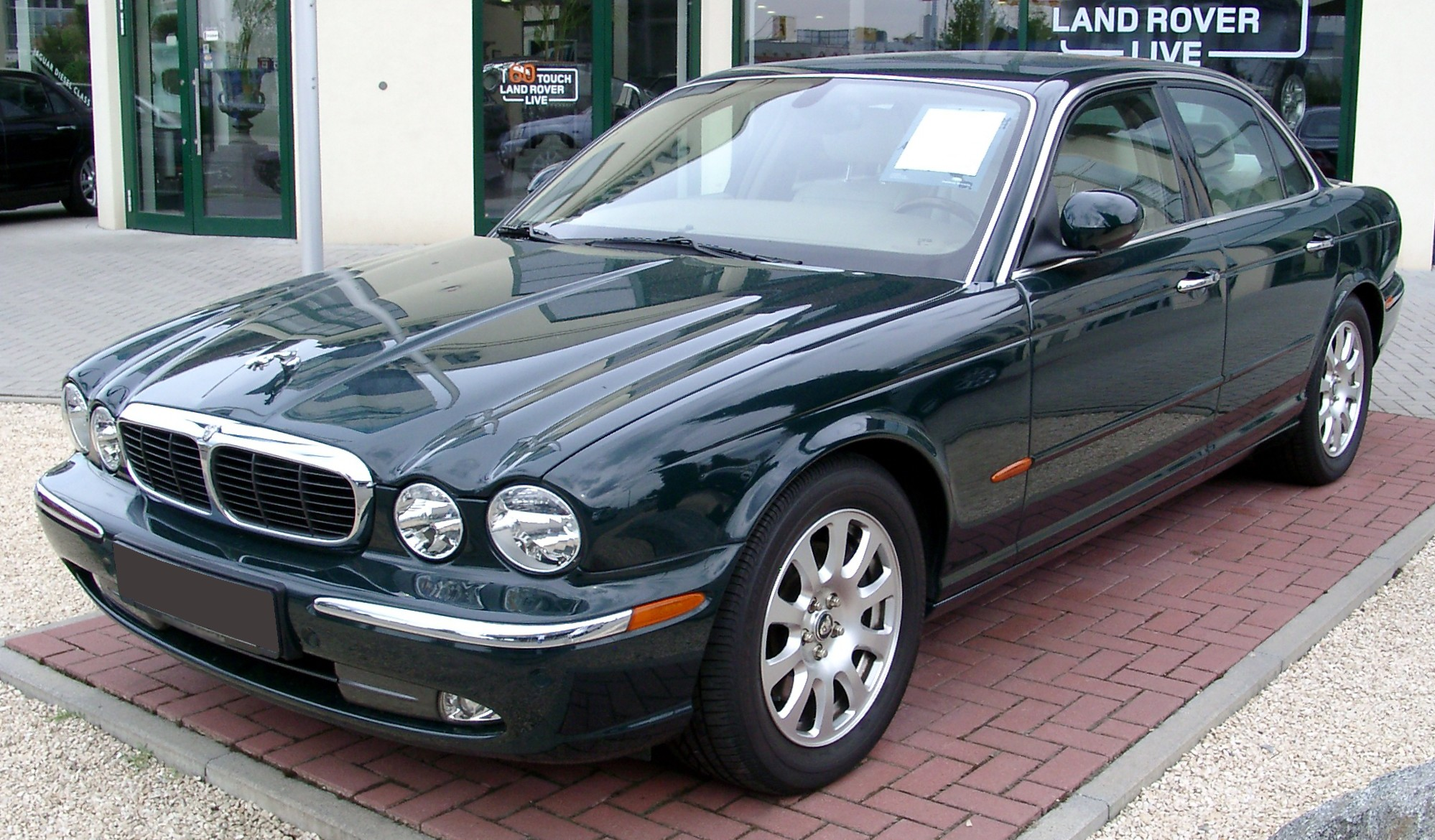
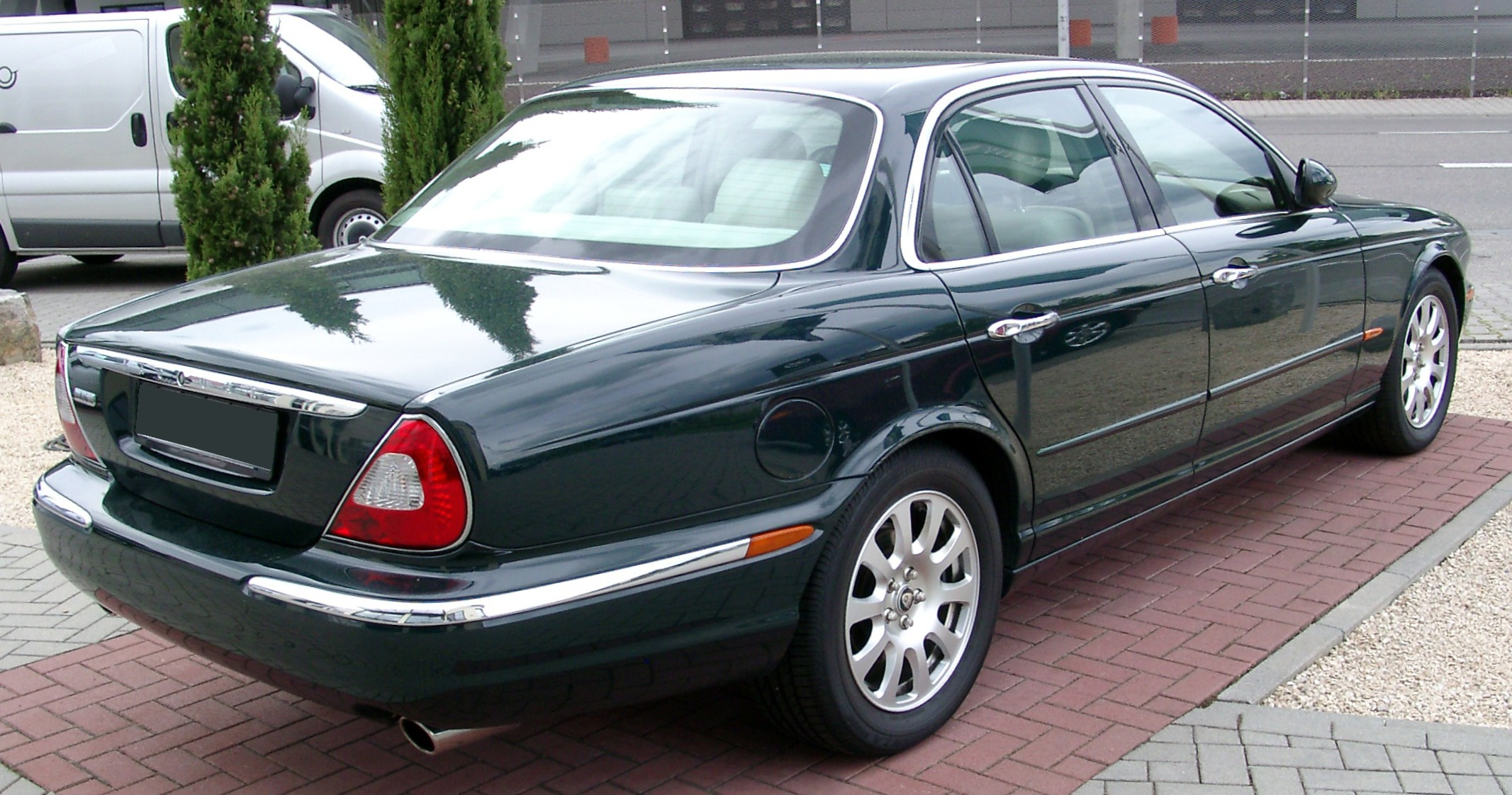
The front (top) and rear (bottom) of a 2004 Jaguar XJ6 3.0

The X350's aluminium bodyshell used an aerospace construction method, a hybrid of adhesive bonding and rivet joinery and known as rivet-bonding or riv-bonding, which was an industry first in volume automotive production. Both chassis and car body formed an aluminium unibody structure. Using aluminium rather than steel required new techniques, technological development, and production layout, along with significant investment.

The stressed aluminium unibody used 15 aluminium castings, 35 extrusions, and 284 stampings, which were bonded using 120 yards of robotically applied, heat-cured, aerospace-grade epoxy adhesives, and approximately 3,200 self-piercing zinc-coated, boron steel rivets, which were Jaguar's first use of self-piercing rivets. In addition to the rivets, which do not require a predrilled or punched hole, each rivet making its own hole on insertion, the process also uses a small number of nuts, bolts, and spot welds. Castings and extrusions accounted for about 11 percent of the XJ bodyshell.

To ensure manufacturing feasibility, numerous styling elements required a redesign to accommodate forming in aluminium rather than steel, including the bonnet profiles, especially around the headlamps; the radii in the wing-to-bumper gaps and the rear wing/door shut pressing; the side light configuration, and the bodyside haunch. Jaguar's chief program engineer Russ Varney, who engineered the Jaguar XK's 2007 redesign, said the XJ also taught Jaguar "about the 'springback' of stamped parts, where the pieces won't keep their exact shape."

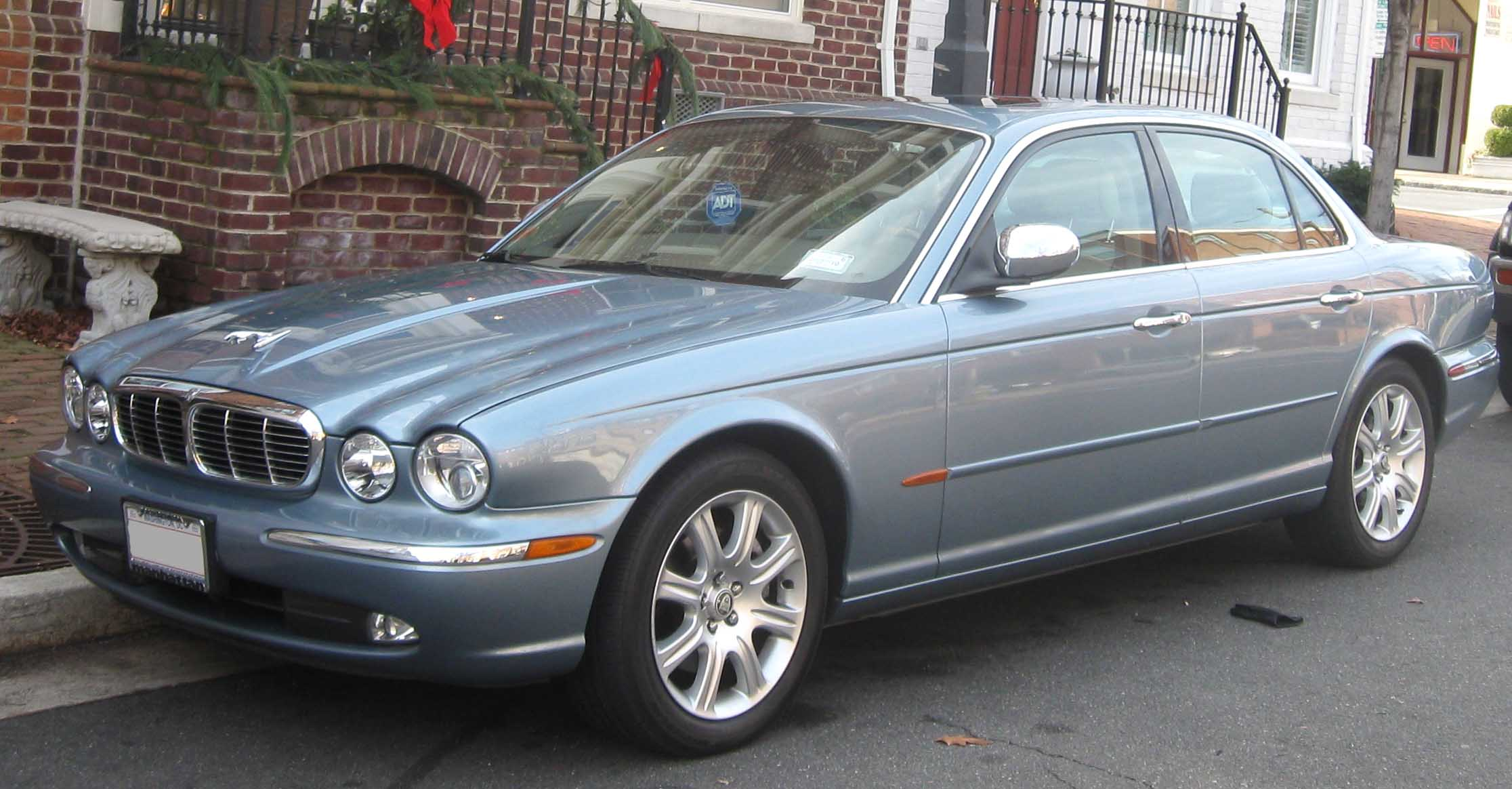
A 2005 Jaguar XJ8

To reduce front-end collision repair costs and ameliorate increased insurance rates associated with aluminium construction, the body was designed to withstand an impact of 10 mph without structural damage and used a bolt-on front-end module (BOFE). A hydroformed aluminium extrusion with an energy-absorbing foam cover formed a bumper beam cross-member, to provide strength and crushability in the event of a minor collision. Sacrificial extruded aluminium crash cans were designed to protect the body structure and front-end componentry.

Steel is used for front and rear subframes, and magnesium, which is as strong as aluminium while 30 per cent lighter, is used for seat frames and lateral instrument panel beams. Jaguar had previously and prominently used aluminum construction in the XK120, which was produced in the 1940s and used aluminium panels, along with its C‑Type and D‑Type race cars, as well as the 1960s E-Type, which used aluminium chassis and body design. Ford retained the bonding and riveting patents of the XJ's aluminium monocoque body when it sold Jaguar to Indian automobile manufacturer Tata Motors in 2008.

=== Design and engineering ===
External images
- Jaguar X350 Design Study
- Jaguar X350 Design Study
- Jaguar X350 Design Study
- Jaguar X350 Design Study

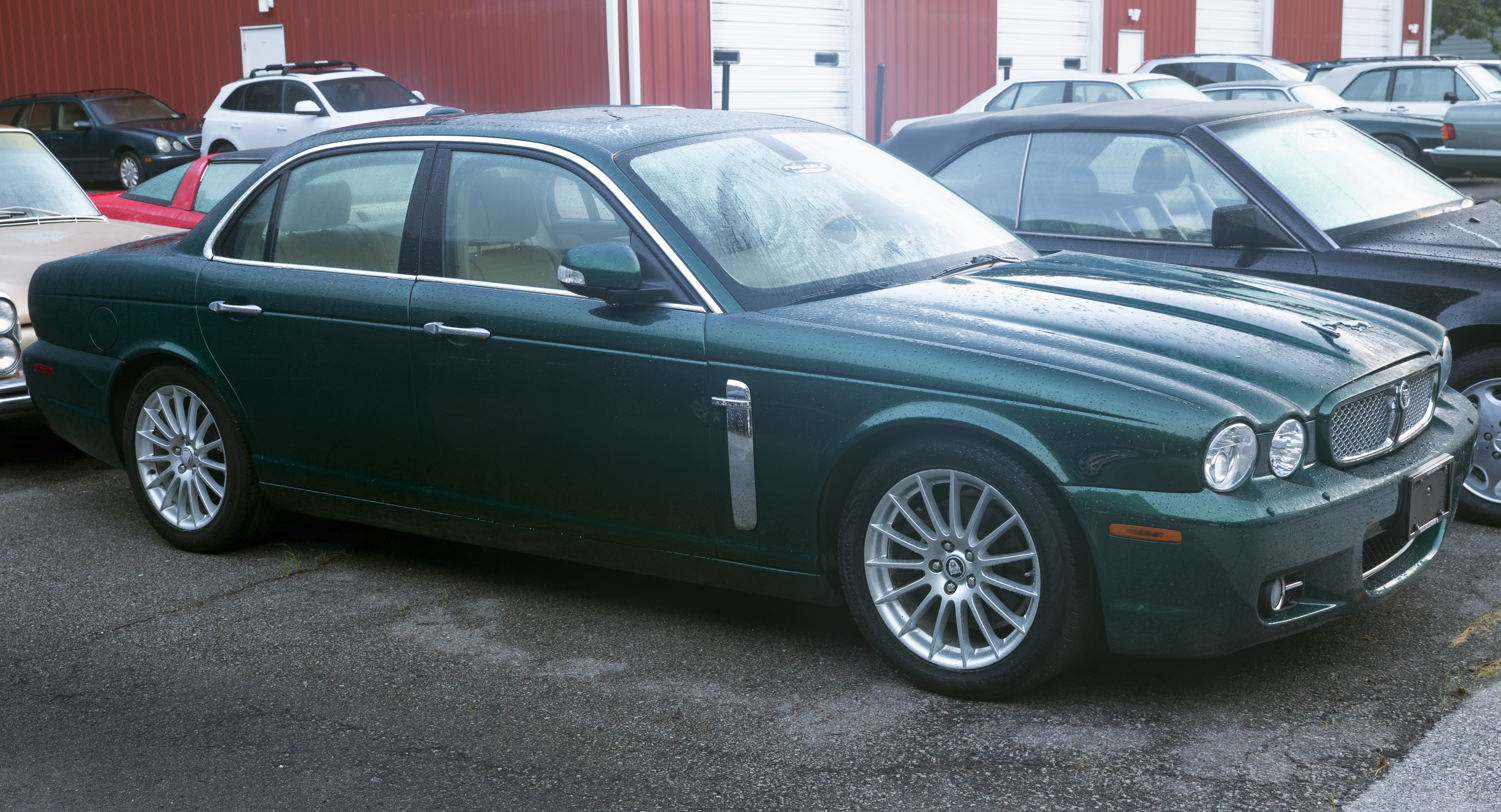
A facelifted 2008 Jaguar XJ8 with the chrome side vent trim

The X350 employed a multi-link suspension layout with four-wheel self-levelling, adaptive air suspension instead of the previous generation's double wishbone of the Jaguar IRS. The suspension was controlled electronically, requiring no intervention from the driver, to adjust damper settings (in milliseconds) and the ride, and handling under varying conditions; this electronic control system was marketed as the Computer Active Technology Suspension (CATS). The air suspension was designed to activate every 24 hours to level the vehicle when parked and not in use.

From the previous generation, the overall body was wider, longer, and higher—with increased head, leg, shoulder, and cargo room—and carried a .32 coefficient of drag. Door shut lines were engineered uniformly to a 3.8 mm gap to adjacent body elements. The bonnet and boot were engineered to 3.5 mm to adjacent body elements. The doors opened to 62 degrees front and 65 degrees rear.

The long-wheelbase model, introduced in 2005, was the longest vehicle Jaguar had manufactured at the time. With a five inch extension behind the B-pillar (i.e. the rear doors were 5 inches longer), the extended model had a 3,159.8 mm (124.4 in) wheelbase and overall length of 5,214.6 mm (205.3 in); the bodyshell's weight increased by 24 kg (53 lb) and the roof height increased by 7 mm (0.28 in) over the standard-wheelbase XJ. The turning radius was increased by 13 inches over the standard-wheelbase model.

The 12-volt wiring system used multiplexing to integrate four systems: low-speed, event-driven communications around the body; high-speed powertrain system (engine, transmission, air suspension system, and instrument cluster); fibre-optic communication protocol for telematics, navigation, phone, voice activation, audio, and multimedia systems; and safety systems protocol. Ian Callum, who took over the position of Director of Design after the death of Geoff Lawson, summarised: "The new XJ is a luxury car with a true sense of gravitas. The proportions, stance and obvious dynamic quality clearly display that all-important Jaguar DNA and give it real presence on the road."

=== Equipment ===
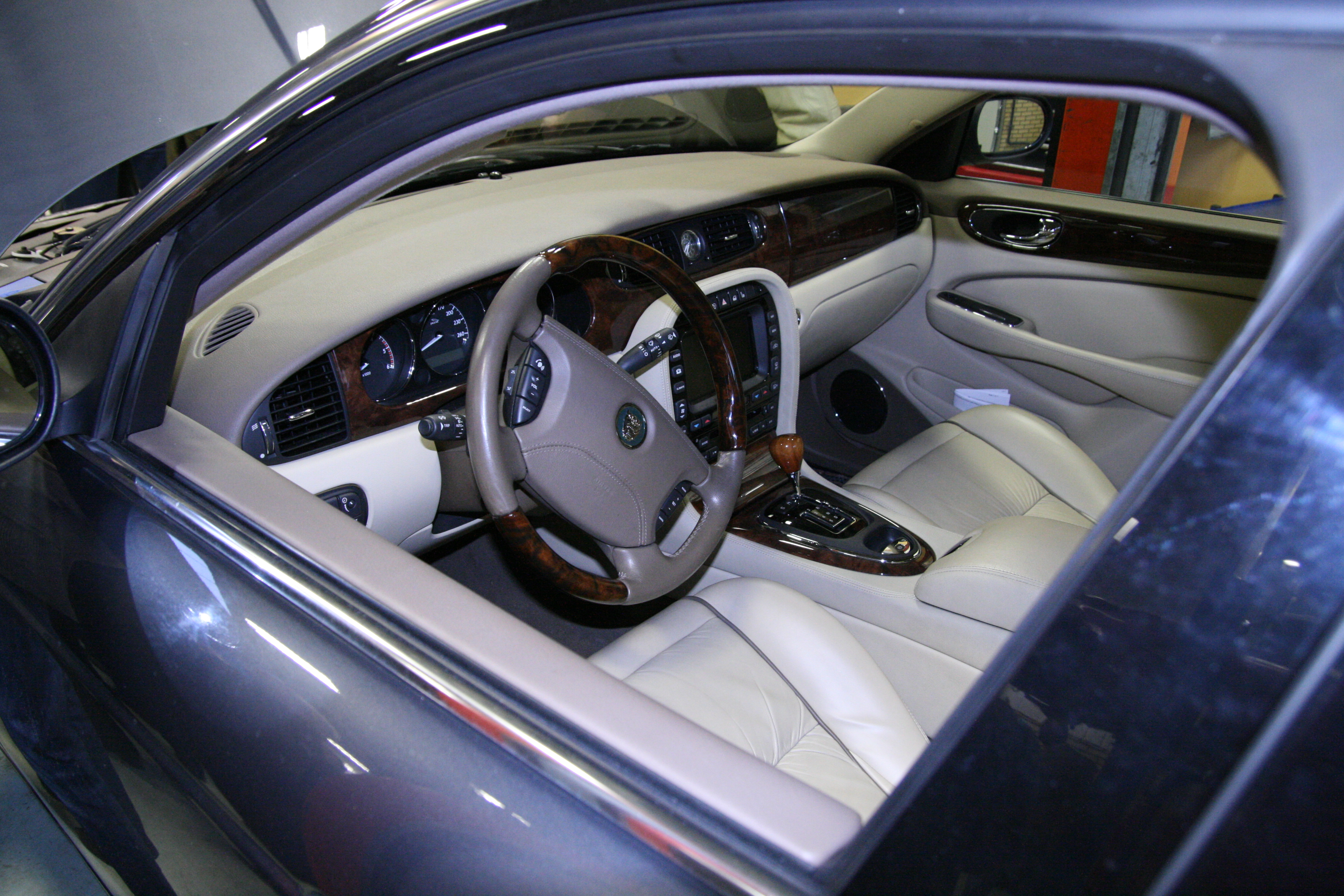
Interior of a 2006 Jaguar Sovereign

At introduction, standard equipment included mirror-matched walnut burl wood grain trim throughout the interior, piano-black center console trim, leather seating, wood-trimmed steering wheel, leather-covered overhead assist handles, dual-zone automatic climate control, glass electric tilt and slide sunroof with single-touch open/close, rain-sensing automatic wipers, automatic headlights, front fog lights, 24 lamp LED taillights, front and rear parking sensors, boot power latching mechanism, electrically adjustable steering wheel with memory and entry/exit function, electrochromic self-dimming side mirrors with compass, a trip computer, electrically adjustable pedals with 2.5 inch travel, 4 power points, all window one-touch up/down power operation, metallic paint (no-cost option), a full-size spare tyre, electronically tilt and telescoping steering wheel, keyless entry, puddle lamps, electronic park brake, and 8-speaker, 320-watt sound system with boot-mounted 6-CD changer and in-dash CD player.

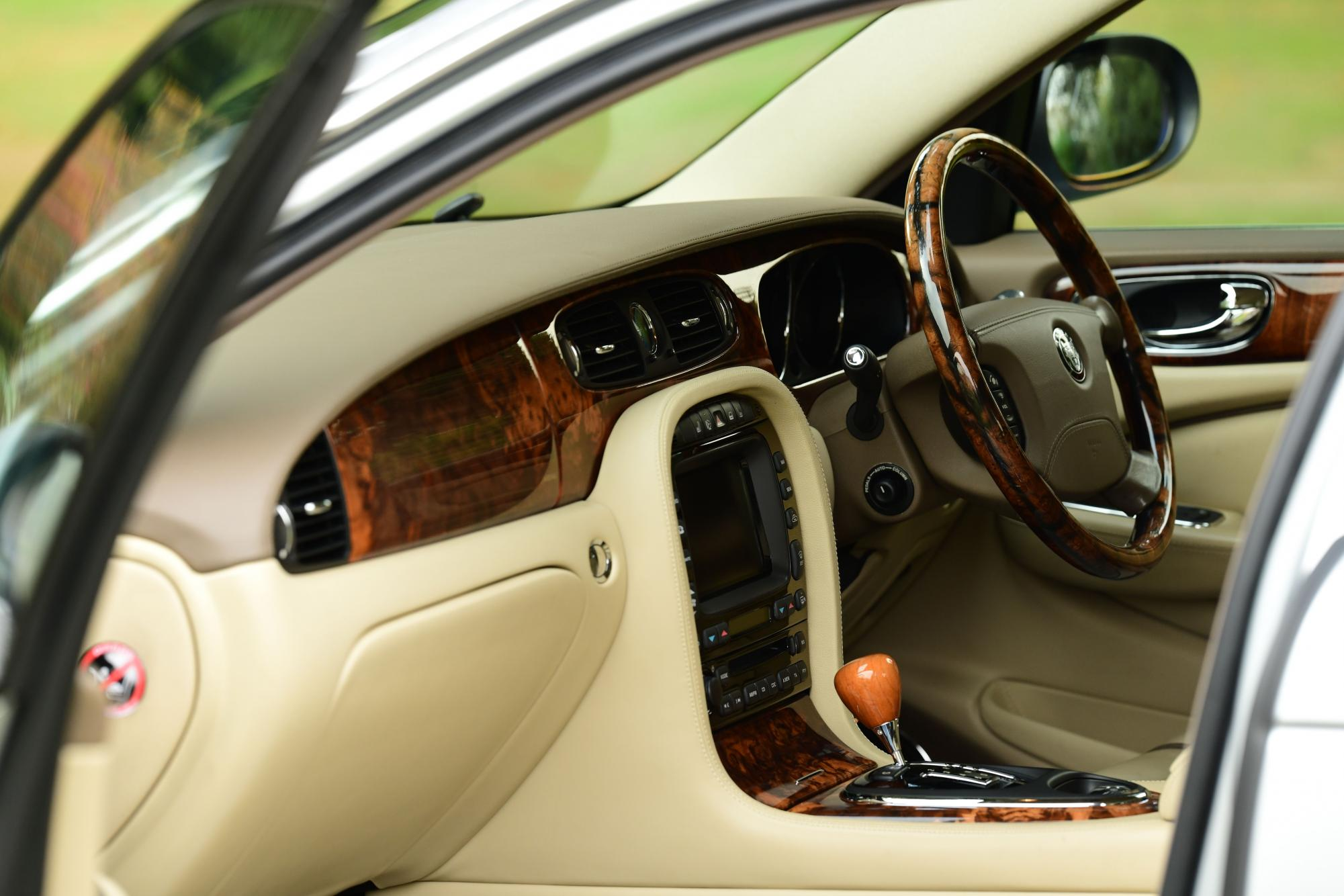
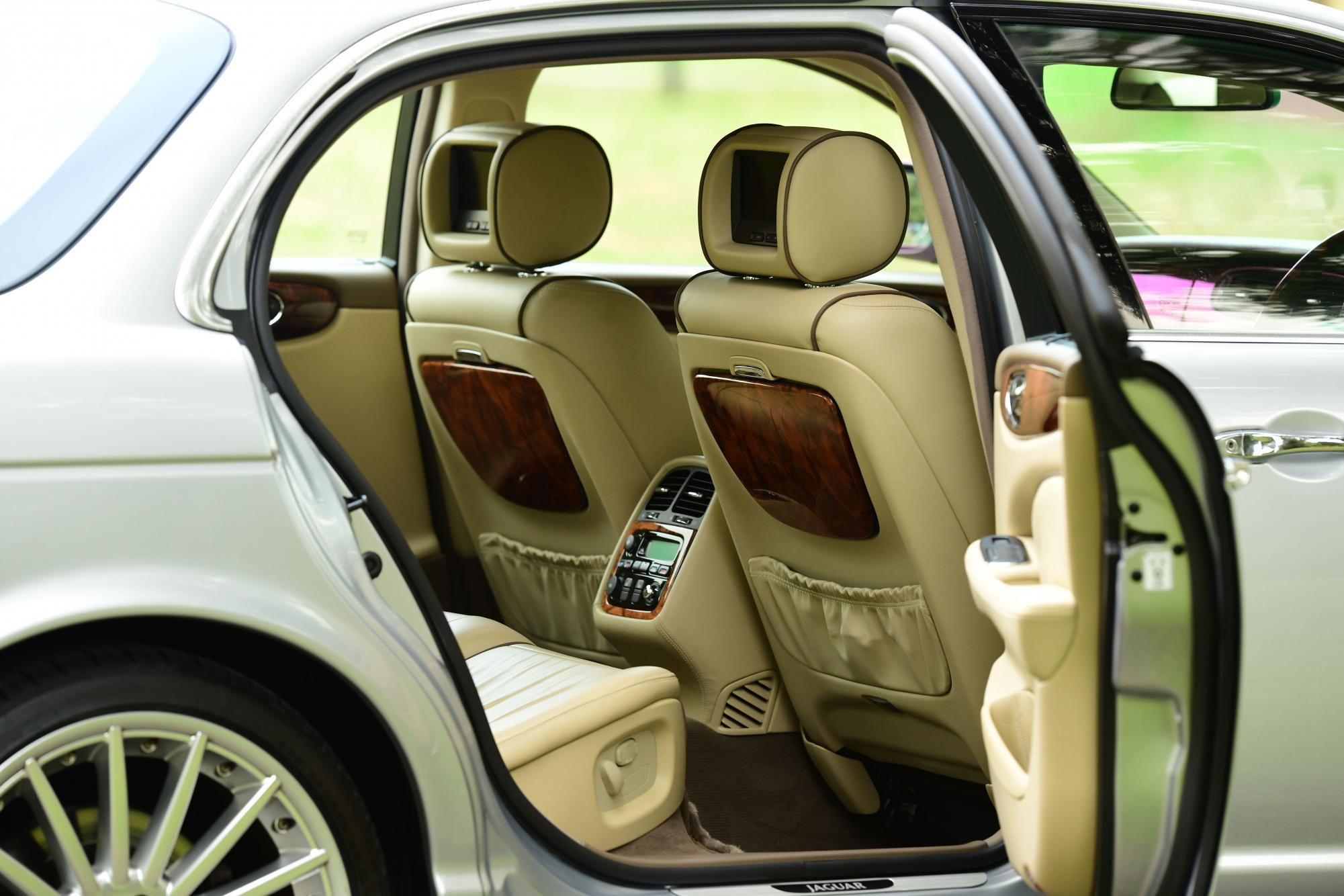
Front and passenger seats interior of a 2007 Jaguar Sovereign

Safety systems included four-channel anti-lock brakes with emergency brake assist, traction control, dynamic stability control, and front, side thorax, and full-length side curtain airbags. Electronic coordination of seatbelts and airbags, marketed as Advanced Restraint Technology System (ARTS) was designed to sense crash severity, driver position and seatbelt status using ultrasonic and seat weight sensors to optimize airbag deployment force.

Optional equipment included xenon headlights, headlight powerwash, adaptive cruise control, multi-stage heated seats, heated steering wheel, DVD navigation (with postal code programming where country-provided), soft-grain ruched (micro-pleated) leather seats and trim, electrically adjustable pedals, and rear-seat multimedia entertainment system for CD listening or DVD movie watching via front seat head restraint-mounted video screens. At introduction, upper trim levels offered soft grain leather, leatherette fascia top and contrasting seat piping, inlaid Peruvian boxwood trim, lambswool rugs, 320-watt, 12-speaker audio system, 4-zone heating and cooling system, 16-way adjustable front seats, rear heated seats and optional electrically reclining rear seat, and power rear centre sunblind. The rear seating of long-wheelbase models could be equipped with a fixed or power-adjustable bench or individually powered and heated seats.

=== Engines ===
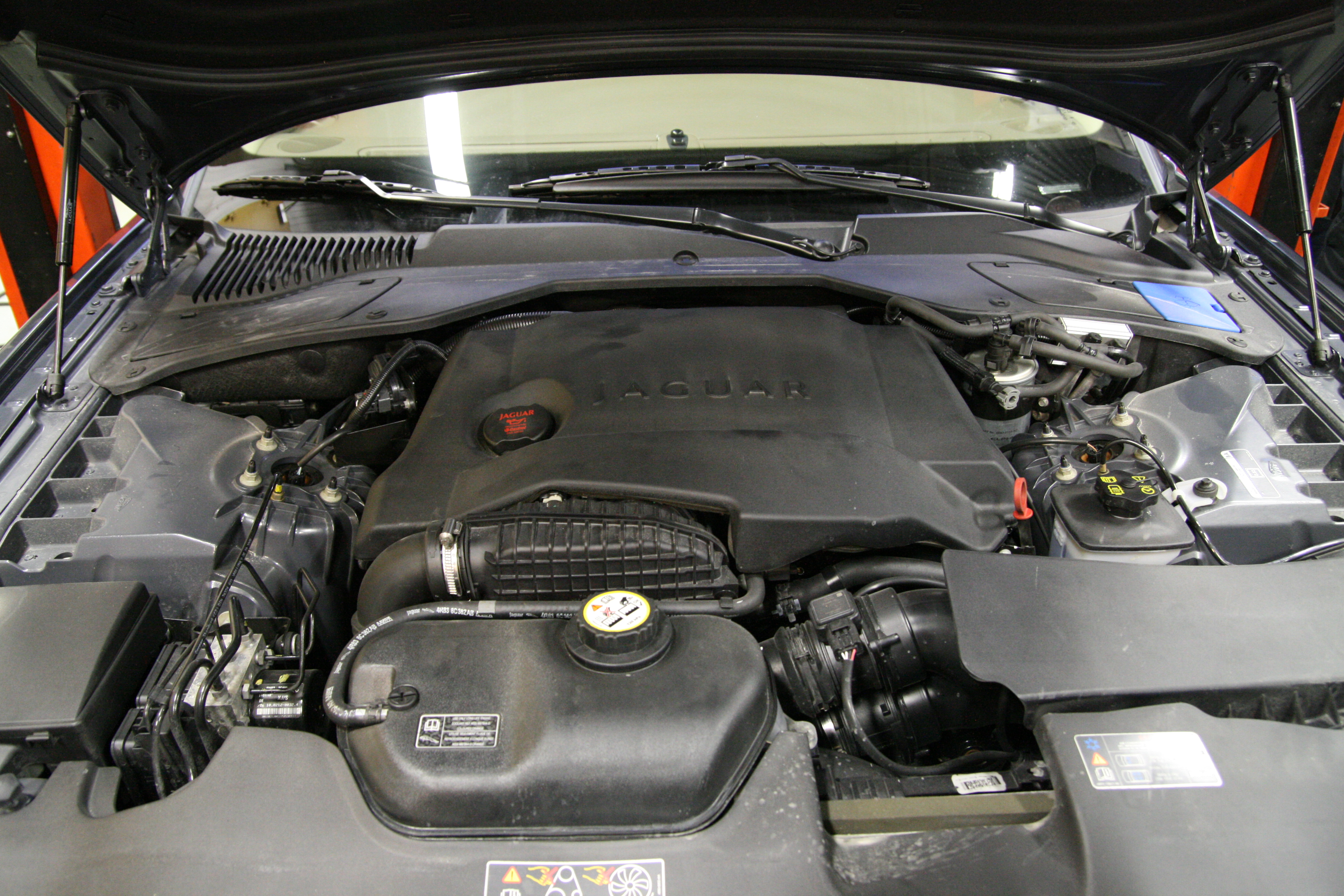
A Jaguar XJ 2.7-litre turbo diesel V6, the XJ's basic engine in many markets.

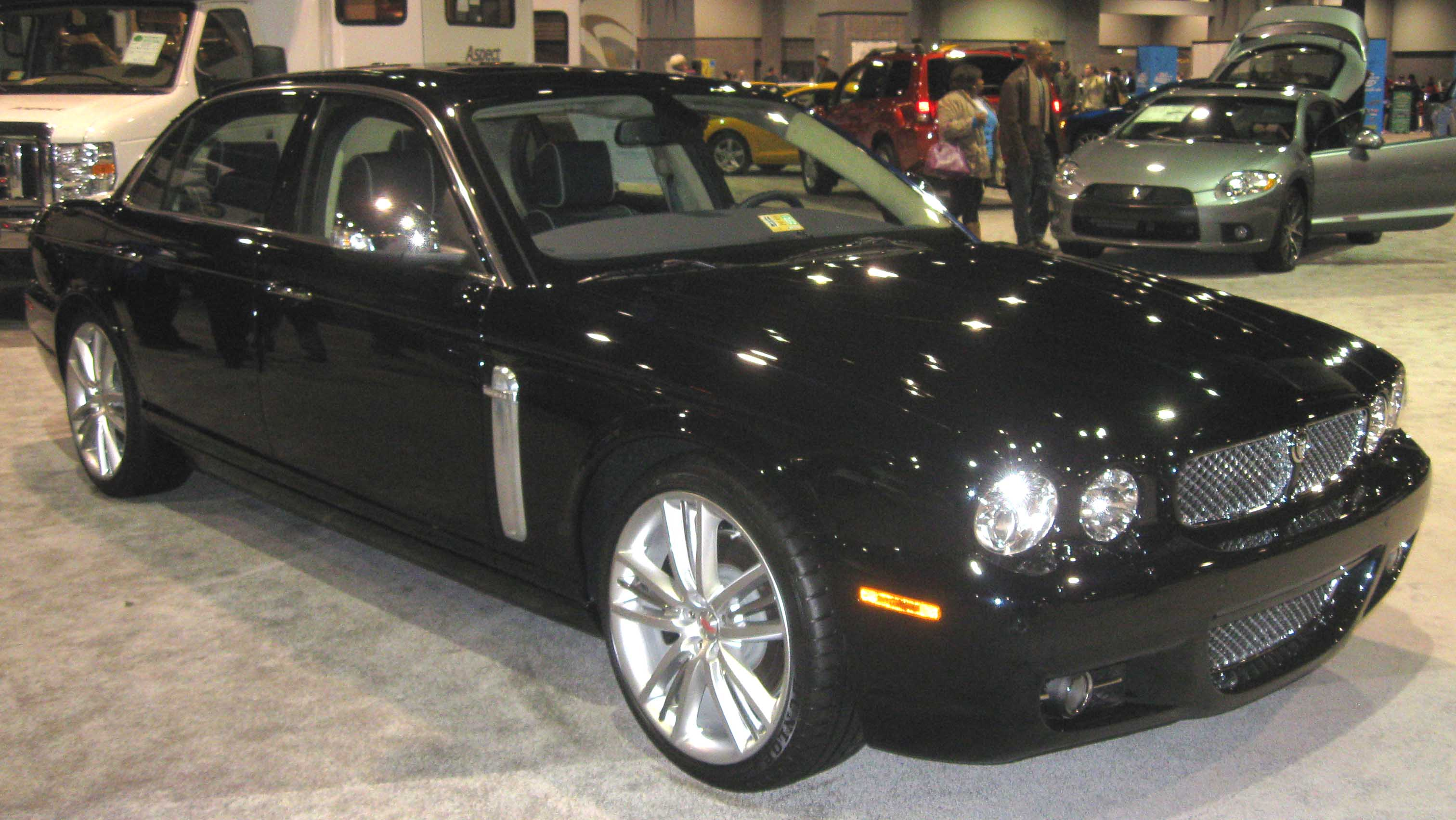
A Jaguar XJ8 Super V8 at the 2009 Washington, D.C., Auto Show. The Super V8 represented the XJ's most powerful engine.

The V8 engines remained in the new model but were the revised and more powerful versions found in the 2003 S-Type. The 294 PS 4.0 L and 375 PS 4.0 L supercharged engines from the X308 Mk II were replaced by the S-Type's 300 PS (221 kW; 296 hp) 4.2 L and 400 PS (294 kW; 395 hp) 4.2 L supercharged units respectively, while a new 3.5 L V8 was also introduced for the European market, was derived from the 4.2 L engine, and was rated at 265 PS (195 kW; 261 hp).

The 243 PS (179 kW; 240 hp) 3.2 L V8 from the previous model was replaced by the 3.0 L V6 from the X-Type and S-Type. The V6 powers the XJ6, while the XJ8 was powered by a naturally aspirated V8. The XJR was powered by a supercharged 4.2 L V8. The XJ6 and the XJ TDVi are the only X350 models not sold in the Americas. In 2005, Jaguar introduced the diesel-powered XJ TDVi, featuring the same Ford–Peugeot-developed 2.7-litre twin-turbocharged V6 found in the S-Type. The engine, known as the AJD-V6, is rated at 204 PS (150 kW; 201 hp) and 321 lb⋅ft (435 N⋅m) of torque, and was fitted with electronically controlled active engine mounts to minimise vibration at idle. Both X350 and X358 used a six-speed automatic transmission manufactured by ZF Friedrichshafen.

North American XJ models were equipped with the 300 hp (224 kW; 304 PS) naturally aspirated engine or an optional 400 hp (298 kW; 406 PS) supercharged 4.2 L V8 engine. The latter engine's valvetrain had a dual overhead cam design with four valves per cylinder and its top speed was electronically limited to 155 mph (249 km/h).

| Model | Type | Power, torque at rpm |
|---|---|---|
| 2.7-litre V6 diesel | 2.7 L twin-turbocharged V6 | 204 PS (150 kW; 201 hp), 435 N⋅m (321 lb⋅ft) |
| 3.0-litre V6 petrol | 3.0 L naturally aspirated V6 | 240 PS (177 kW; 237 hp) |
| 3.5-litre V8 petrol | 3.5 L naturally aspirated V8 | 265 PS (195 kW; 261 hp), 345 N⋅m (254 lb⋅ft) |
| 4.2-litre V8 petrol | 4.2 L naturally aspirated V8 | 300 PS (221 kW; 296 hp) |
| 4.2-litre supercharged V8 petrol | 4.2 L supercharged V8 | 400 PS (294 kW; 395 hp) |

=== Trim levels ===
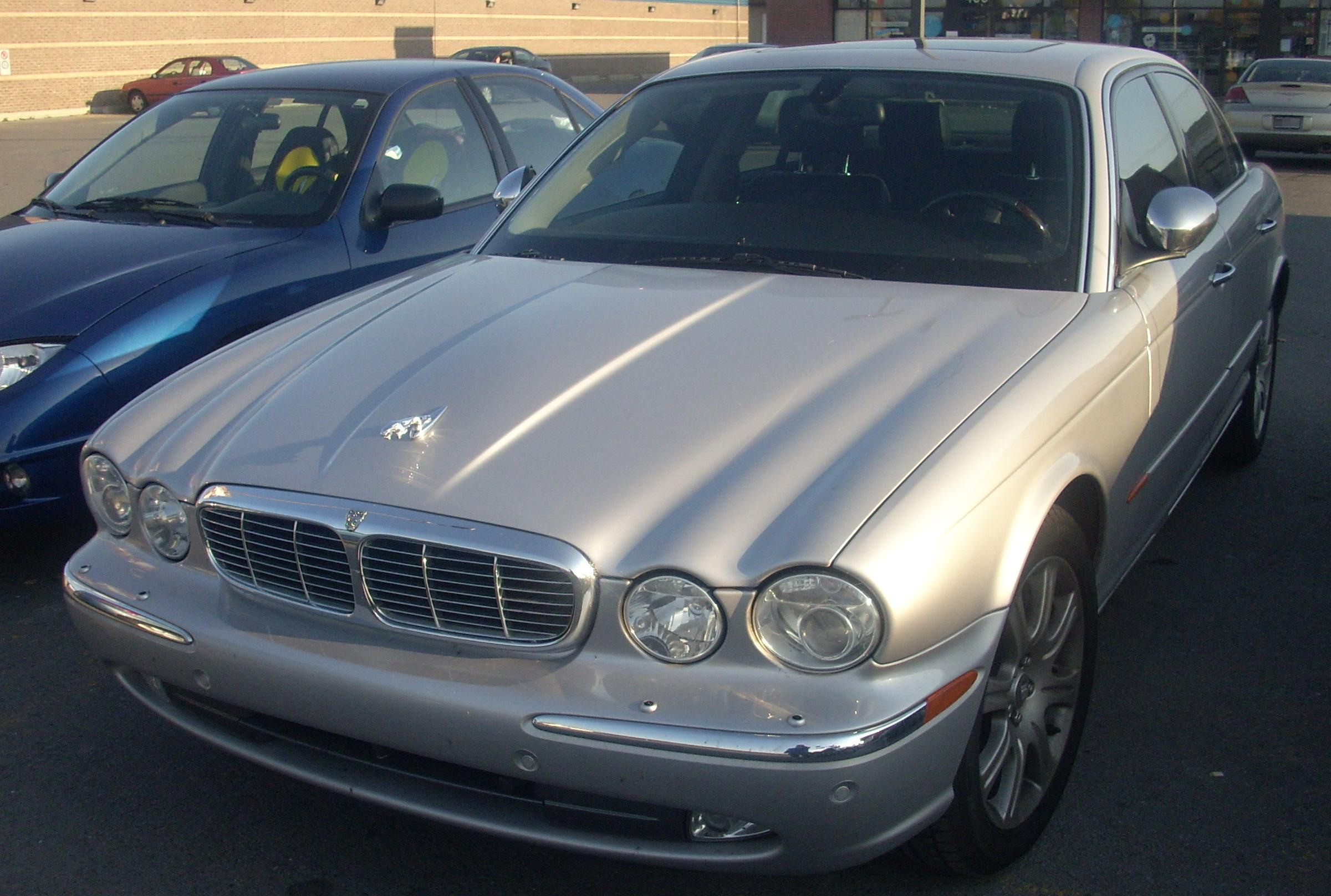
A pre-facelift Jaguar XJ showing the bonnet-mounted ornament

At introduction, the XJ was marketed worldwide in various trim levels, including the XJ8, XJ Vanden Plas, and XJR versions in North America, and the XJ6, XJ8, and XJ Sovereign models in the United Kingdom. The original range in the United Kingdom included the XJ6 3.0-litre at £39,000, the XJ6 3.0-litre Sport at £42,250, the XJ 3.0 SE at £42,250, the XJ8 3.5 SE at £48,000, the XJ8 4.2 SE at £51,500, the XJR at £58,500, and the Super V8 at £68,500.

For the 2005 model year, Jaguar introduced a long-wheelbase variant of the X350. For 2007, the premium model was reintroduced as the Jaguar Sovereign when the Super V8 and Daimler versions were dropped. In early 2005, Jaguar announced the Super V8 Portfolio for the 2006 model year, a limited-edition trim level of the flagship Super V8 saloon. It debuted at the New York International Auto Show in March 2005 with a base price of US$115,995. The Portfolio trim level included a DVD player and 7-inch screens in the rear headrests. The Super V8 Portfolio, marketed in North American markets, became available in August 2005 and was exclusively available in two colours: Black Cherry and Winter Gold. The Super V8 Portfolio was powered by Jaguar's supercharged 400 PS (294 kW), 4.2 L, 32-valve, AJ-V8 engine with a top speed of 249 km/h (155 mph) and a 0 to 97 km/h (0 to 60 mph) acceleration time of about 5 seconds.

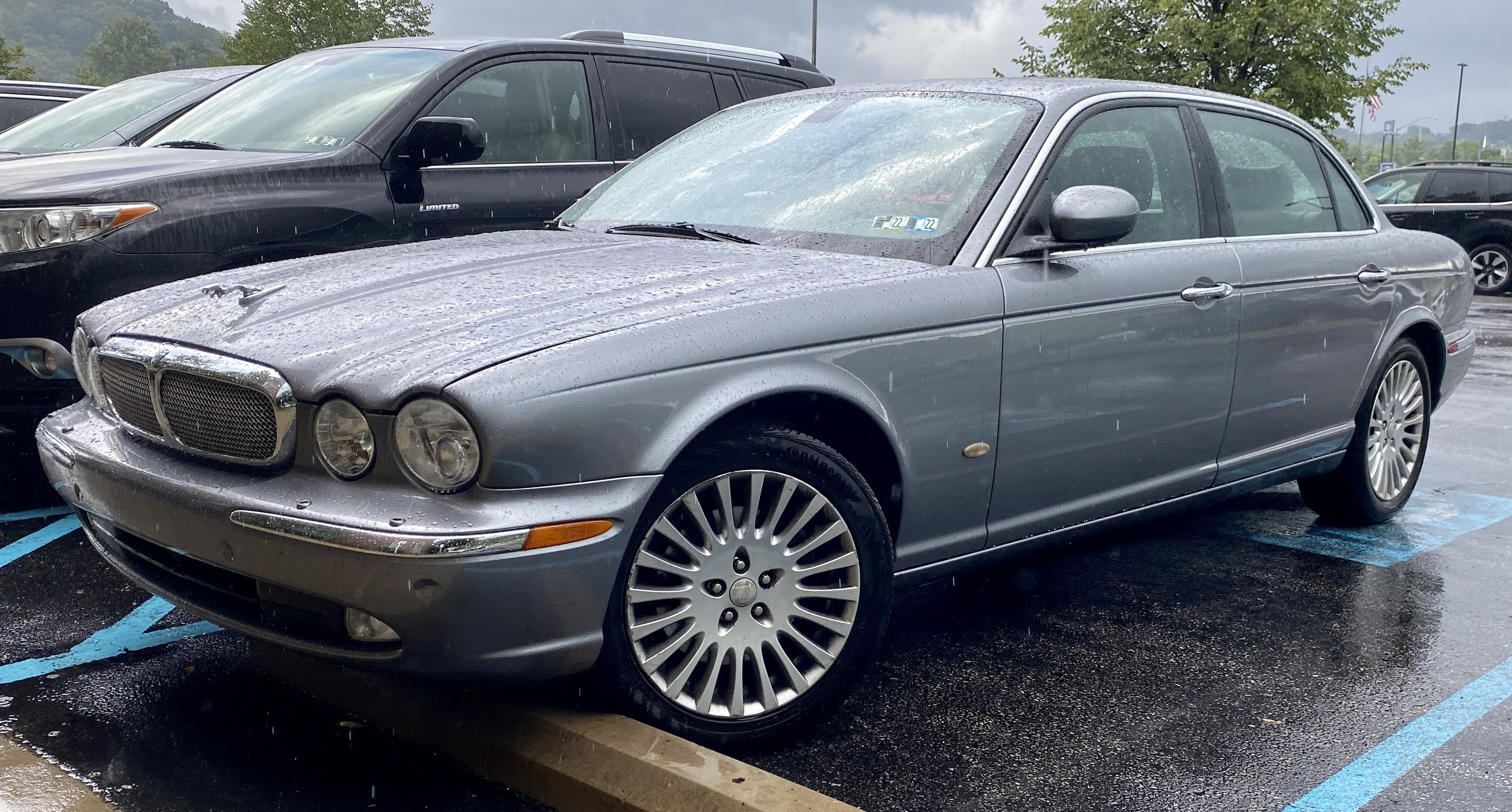
A 2007 Jaguar XJ Vanden Plas

The Super V8 was the most expensive model, with the XJR being the second most expensive model in the range. The Super V8, which debuted in the 2003 model year in the new X350 body style, was initially of a short-wheelbase configuration. This became an option in 2004 when a long-wheelbase configuration was introduced, along with the supercharged variation of the XJ8 with the more luxurious Vanden Plas or Daimler interior. Its primary competitor was the Maserati Quattroporte. A distinctive wire mesh grille and chrome-finished side mirrors set the Super V8 and the XJR apart from the less expensive XJ saloons. In 2005, the Super V8 model was replaced by the Daimler Super Eight in all markets other than North America. The Daimler Super Eight was essentially the same car but had a different grille, boxwood inlays finished in wood veneer, and several other interior luxuries as standard. Daimler's United States equivalent was no longer known as the Vanden Plas but as the Super V8. The Vanden Plas name was used on models that would be known as Sovereign elsewhere. Since the 1980s, Daimler was the official state car for the British prime minister; Daimlers were replaced with Sentinel trim Jaguars in 2011, when the next generation of the Jaguar XJ (X351) was introduced.

== X356 (2005 facelift) ==
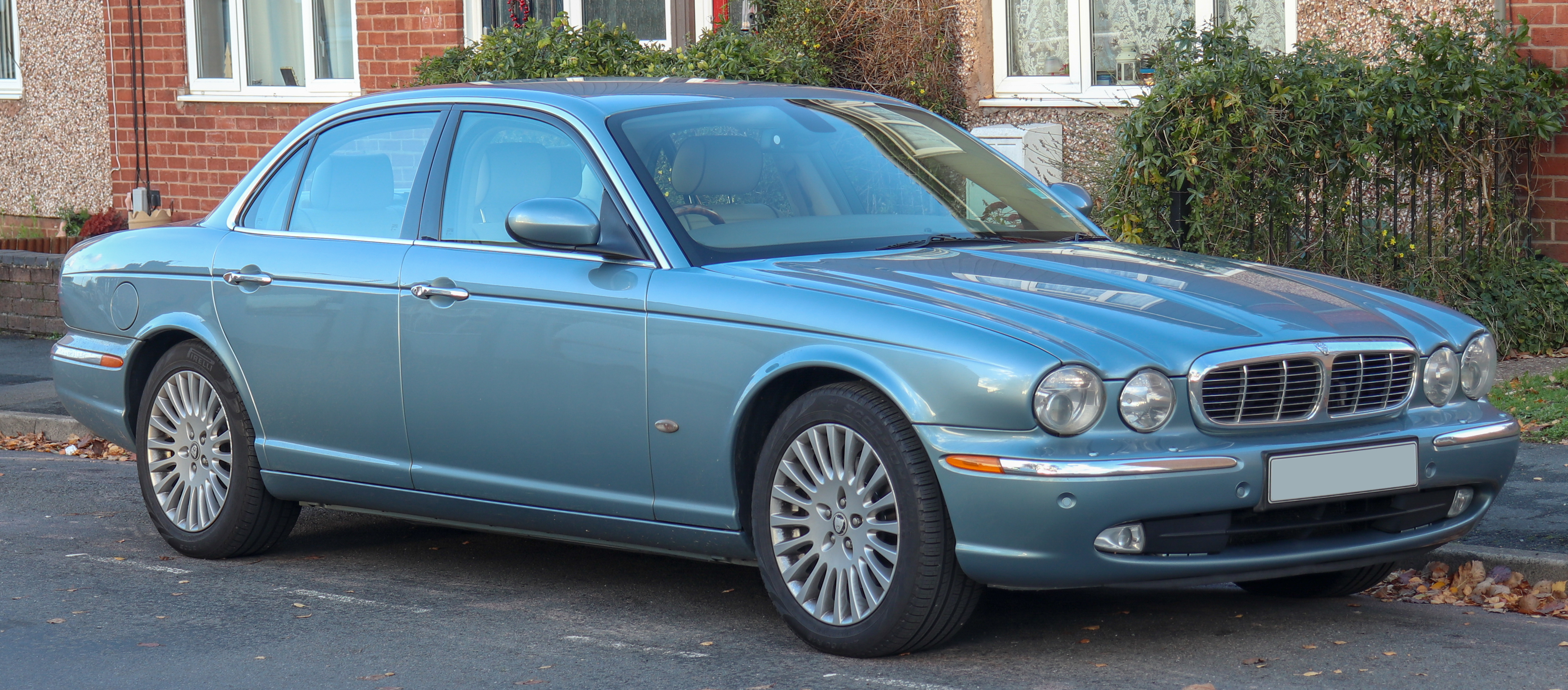
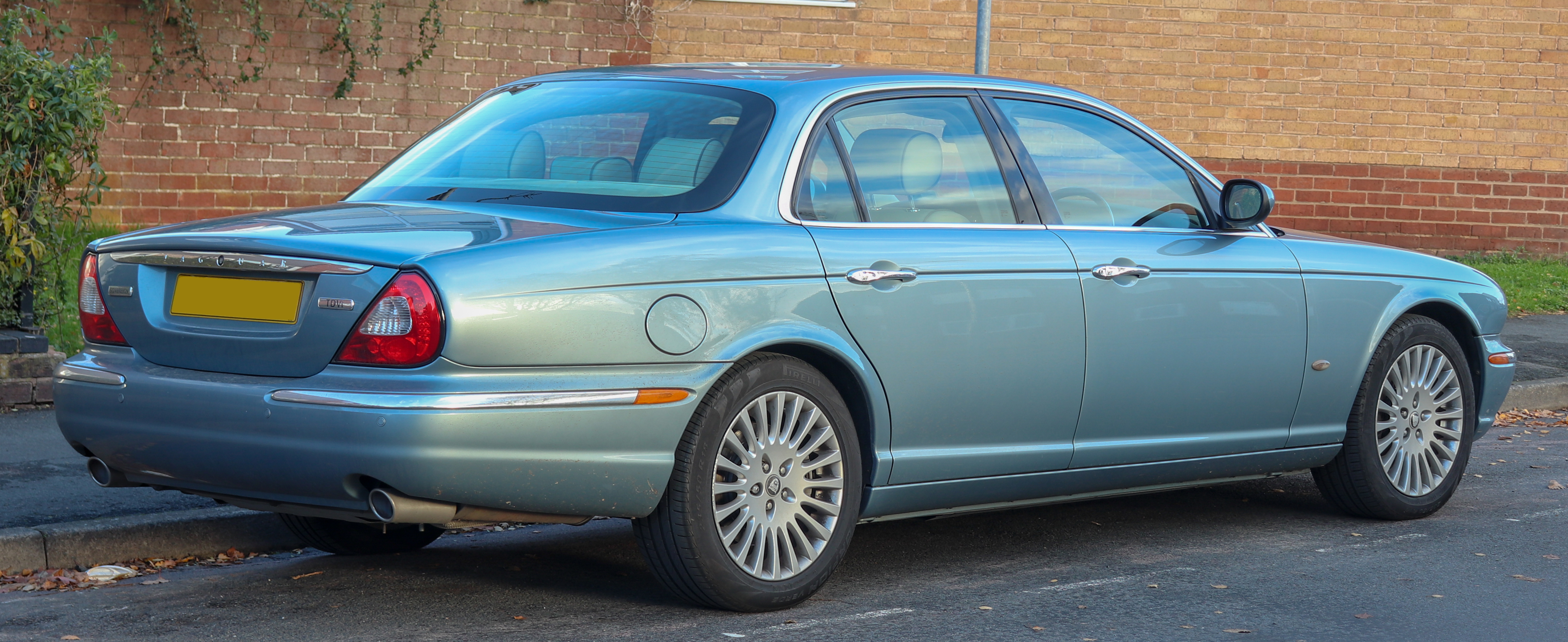
Facelift front (top) and back (bottom) of the Jaguar X356 Sovereign

The facelifted X350 debuted in 2005 for the model year 2006, with a revised front grille, deleted mid-door trim and slightly redesigned front fenders. Some vehicle electronics systems were updated.

=== Trim levels ===
| Models | Executive | Sovereign | XJR | Super V8 |
|---|---|---|---|---|
| Engines | 2.7D, 3.0L, 3.5L, 4.2L | 2.7D, 3.0L, 3.5L, 4.2L | 4.2L supercharged | 4.2L supercharged |
| Wheelbase | Short, long (optional) | Short, long (optional) | Short | Short, long (optional) |
| Wheels (standard) | Dynamic 8Jx18 alloy | Rapier 8Jx18 alloy | Sepang 9Jx20 alloy | Calisto 9Jx20 alloy |

== X358 (2007 facelift) ==
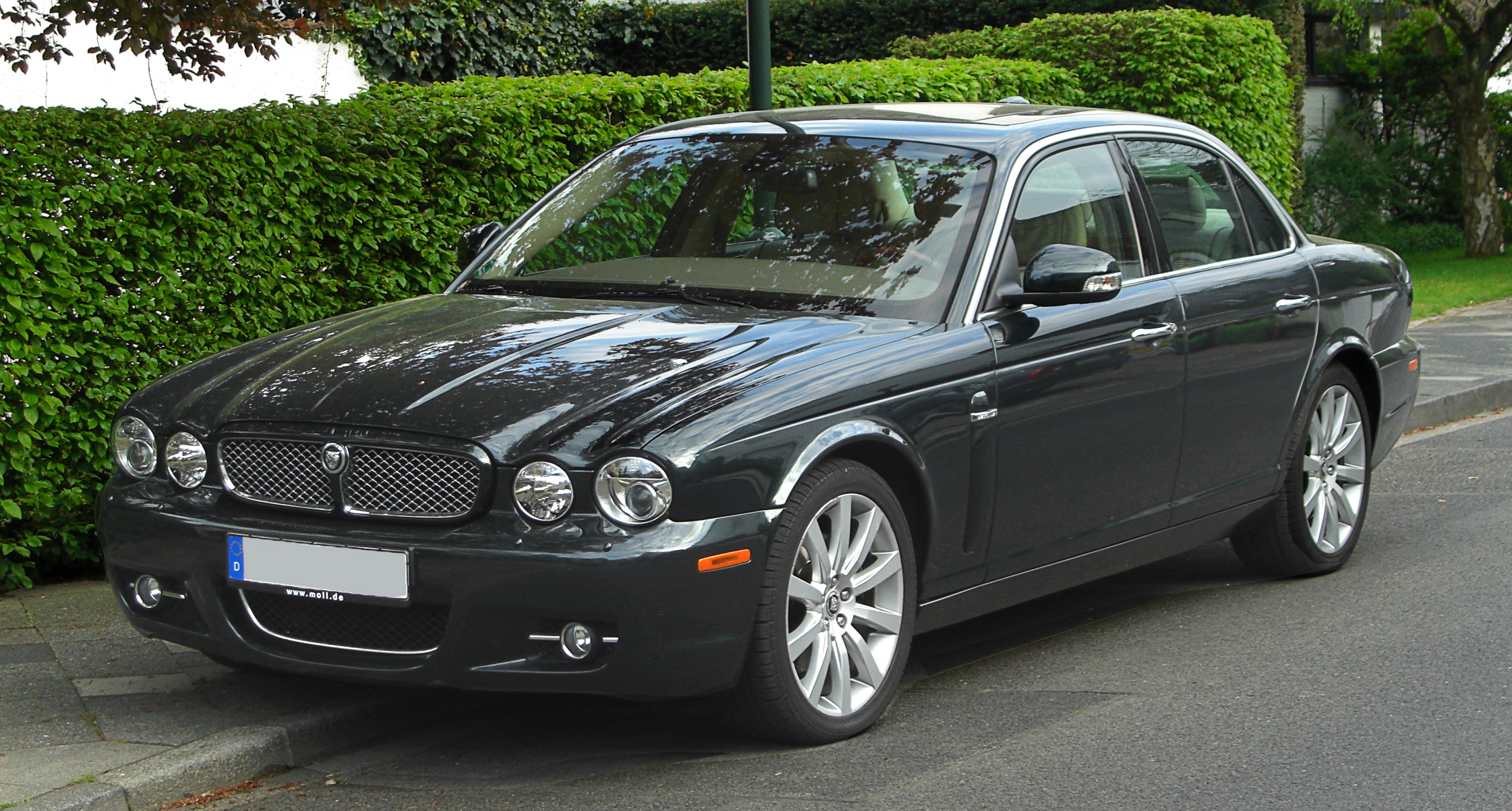
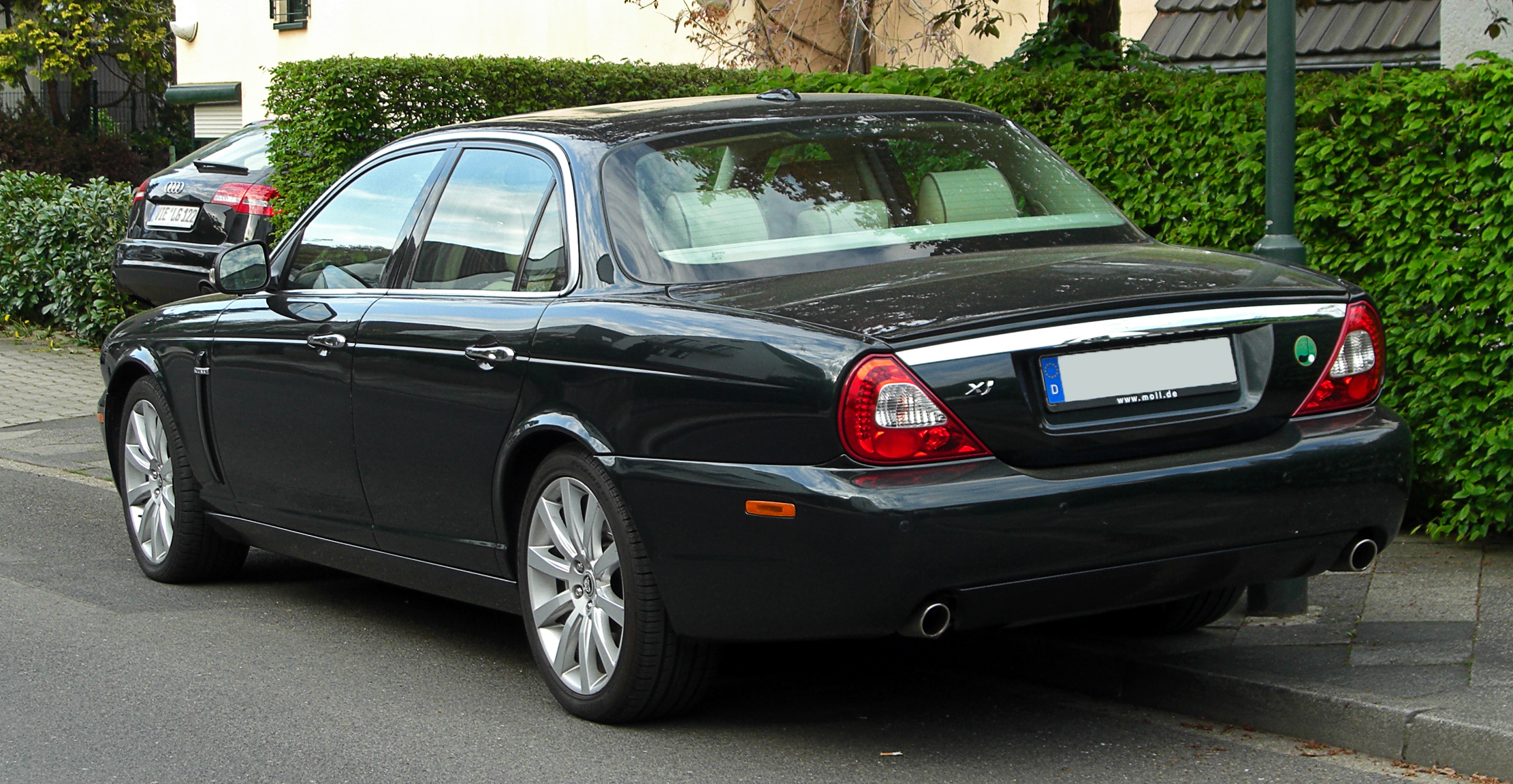
Facelift front (top) and back (bottom) of the Jaguar X358

The facelifted X350 debuted in February 2007 for the 2008 model year with a revised front grille and front bumper assembly featuring a prominent lower grille. A Jaguar emblem within the grille replaced the previous bonnet-mounted ornament.

The front lights were revised and door mirrors incorporated side repeaters. The front wings had prominent faux side vents, and the side sills, rear bumper, and taillights were revised. The interior featured redesigned front seats.

=== Trim levels ===
| Models | Executive | Sovereign | XJR | Super V8 |
|---|---|---|---|---|
| Engines | 2.7D, 3.0L, 3.5L, 4.2L | 2.7D, 3.0L, 3.5L, 4.2L | 4.2L supercharged | 4.2L supercharged |
| Wheelbase | Short, long (optional) | Short, long (optional) | Short | Short, long (optional) |
| Wheels (standard) | Carelia 8.5Jx19 alloy | Polaris 8.5Jx19 alloy | Carelia 8.5Jx20 alloy | Carelia 9Jx20 alloy |

=== Markets ===
United Kingdom
As of November 2007, the following XJ models were available in the United Kingdom:

- XJ 2.7D Executive
- XJ 2.7D Sport Premium
- XJ 3.0L Executive
- XJ 2.7D Sovereign
- 3.0L Sovereign
- 4.2L Sovereign
- XJR 4.2L supercharged
- Daimler Super Eight

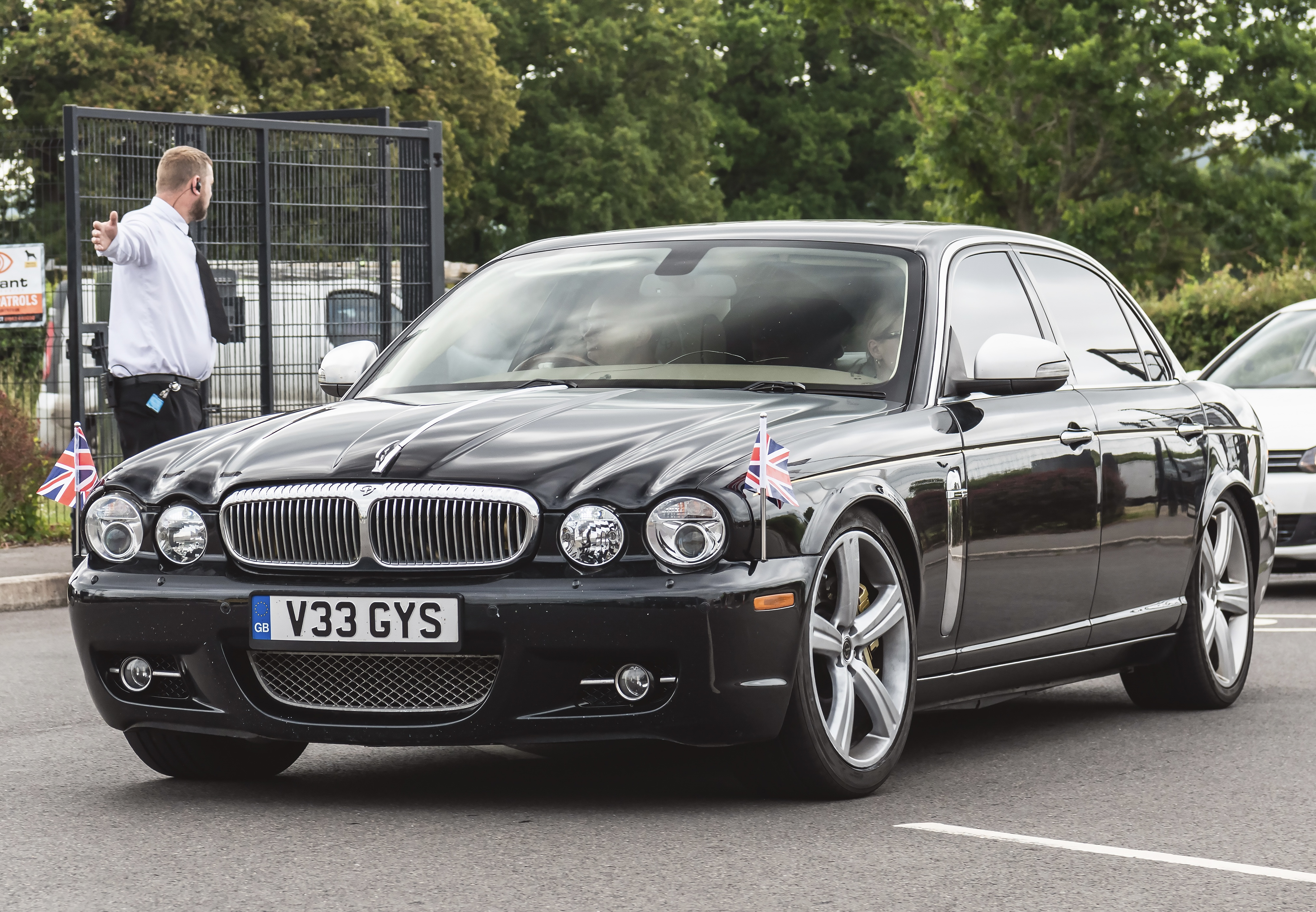
A 2007 Daimler Super Eight, 4.2 Supercharged

Models with the 2.7-litre diesel or with the 3.0-litre petrol V6 engines were known as the XJ6 (since the engines had six cylinders), while the 4.2-litre V8 petrol engine mounted in the Sovereign resulted in that model being known as the XJ8. The model list for the United Kingdom did not include the 3.5-litre V8 engine available in Germany.

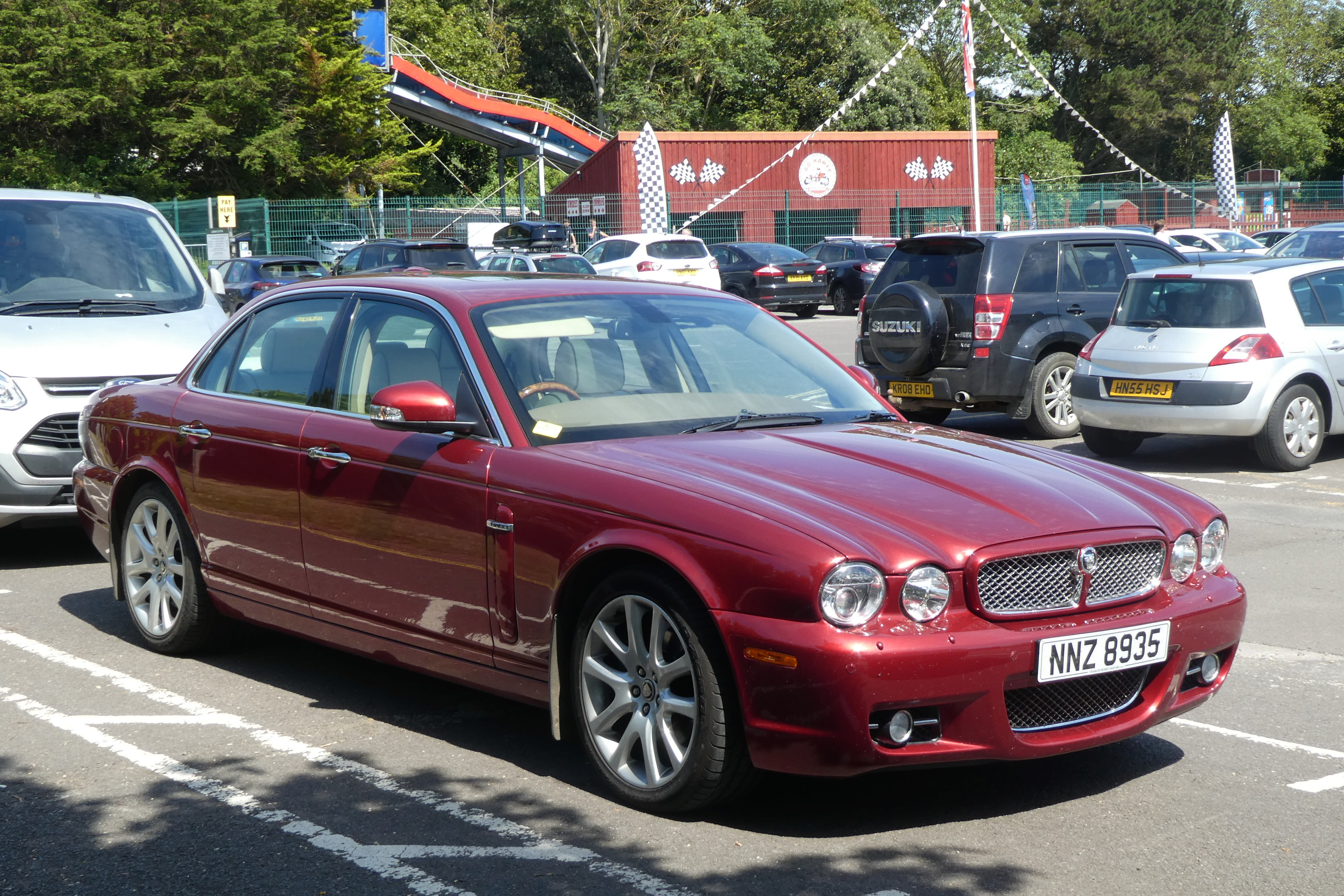
A 2008 Jaguar XJ Sovereign 2.7 Diesel

Germany
From May 2007, the following models were available in Germany:

- XJ6 2.7L Diesel Classic
- XJ6 2.7L Diesel Executive
- XJ6 3.0L Executive
- XJ8 3.5L Executive
- XJ8 4.2L Executive
- XJ6 2.7L Diesel Sovereign
- XJ8 3.5L Sovereign
- XJ8 4.2L Sovereign
- XJR 4.2L V8 Kompressor (this model had the supercharged V8 variant)
- Daimler Super Eight

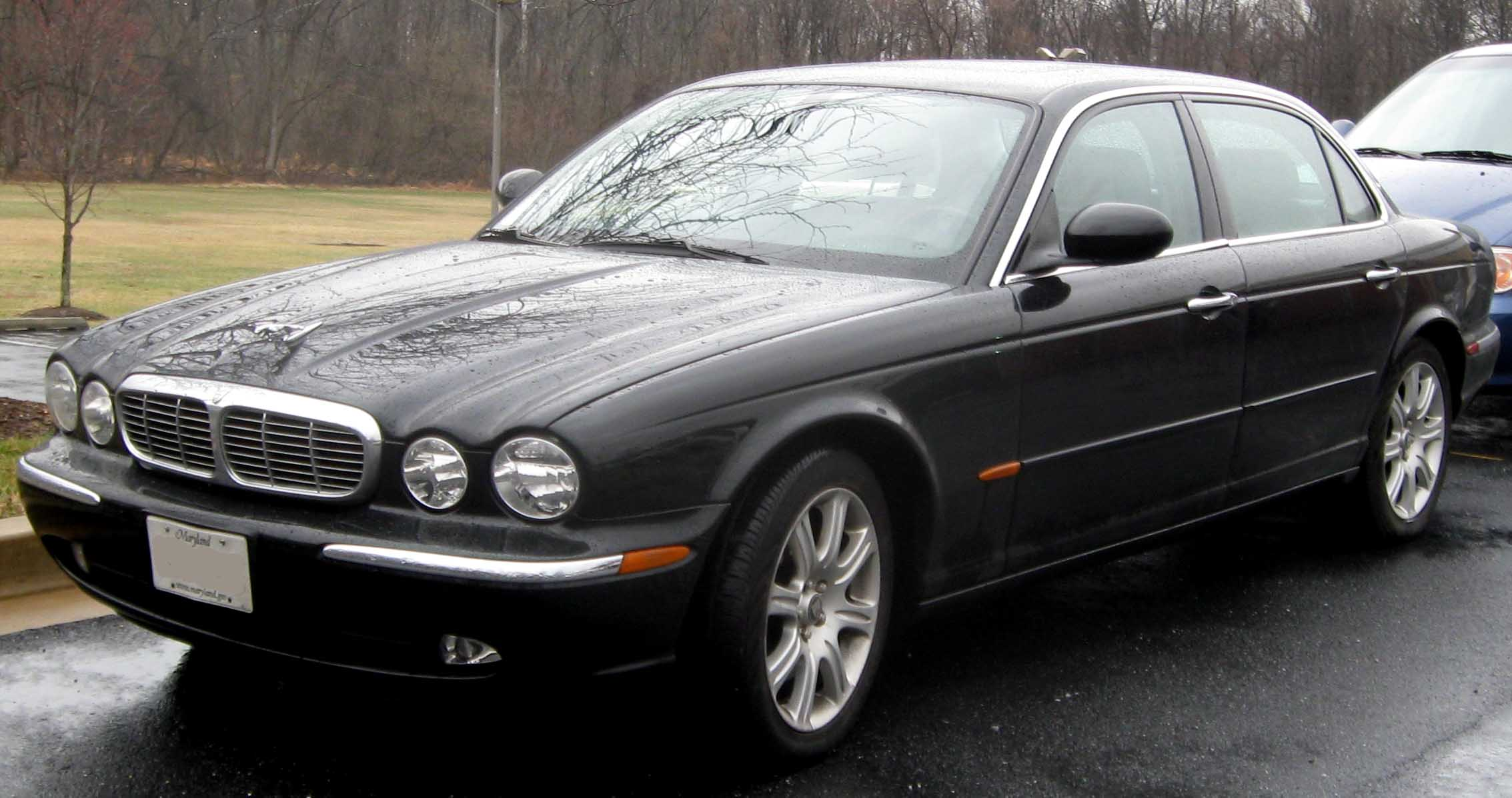
A North American version of the Jaguar XJ8L

North America
From May 2007, the following XJ models were available in North America:

- XJ8
- XJ8L
- XJR
- XJ Vanden Plas (this model was equivalent to Daimler in Europe; the name Daimler was not used by Jaguar in the United States because of trademark restrictions)
- XJ Super V8 (this model was equivalent to Daimler in Europe; the name Daimler was not used by Jaguar in the United States because of trademark restrictions)
- XJ Super V8 Portfolio (limited edition)

Unlike in Europe, the XJ6 and the XJ 2.7D were not available in the United States. The L on the XJ8L badge denoted the long-wheelbase version.

=== Engines ===
All engines were paired with a ZF six-speed automatic transmission. The XJ6 petrol versions had a lower final drive ratio.

| Model | Type (displacement, bore x stroke) | Power and torque (at rpm) | Acceleration 0–100 km/h (62 mph) | Top speed |
|---|---|---|---|---|
| 2.7-litre V6 diesel | 2,720 cc (2.7 L; 166.0 cu in) twin-turbocharged V6, 81 mm × 88 mm (3.19 in × 3.46 in) | 204 PS (150 kW; 201 hp) at 4,000, 435 N⋅m (321 lb⋅ft) at 1,900 | 8.2 s | 225 km/h (140 mph) |
| 3.0-litre V6 petrol | 2,967 cc (3.0 L; 181.1 cu in) V6, 89 mm × 79.5 mm (3.50 in × 3.13 in) | 235 PS (173 kW; 232 hp) at 6,800, 293 N⋅m (216 lb⋅ft) at 4,100 | 8.1 s | 233 km/h (145 mph) |
| 3.5-litre V8 petrol | 3,555 cc (3.6 L; 216.9 cu in) V8, 86 mm × 76.5 mm (3.39 in × 3.01 in) | 265 PS (195 kW; 261 hp) at 6,000, 345 N⋅m (254 lb⋅ft) at 4,100 | 7.6 s | 242 km/h (150 mph) |
| 4.2-litre V8 petrol | 4,196 cc (4.2 L; 256.1 cu in) V8, 86 mm × 90.3 mm (3.39 in × 3.56 in) | 300 PS (221 kW; 296 hp) at 6,000, 420 N⋅m (310 lb⋅ft) at 4,100 | 6.6 s | 250 km/h (155 mph) |
| 4.2-litre V8 petrol supercharged | 4,196 cc (4.2 L; 256.1 cu in) supercharged V8, 86 mm × 90.3 mm (3.39 in × 3.56 in) | 400 PS (294 kW; 395 hp) at 6,100, 541 N⋅m (399 lb⋅ft) at 3,500 | 5.3 s | 250 km/h (155 mph) |

== Special uses ==
The car was used by British prime ministers, including Tony Blair and Gordon Brown. Previous and successive versions of the XJ were also used by Margaret Thatcher, John Major, David Cameron, Theresa May, and Boris Johnson as their Prime Ministerial Car.

== Reception ==
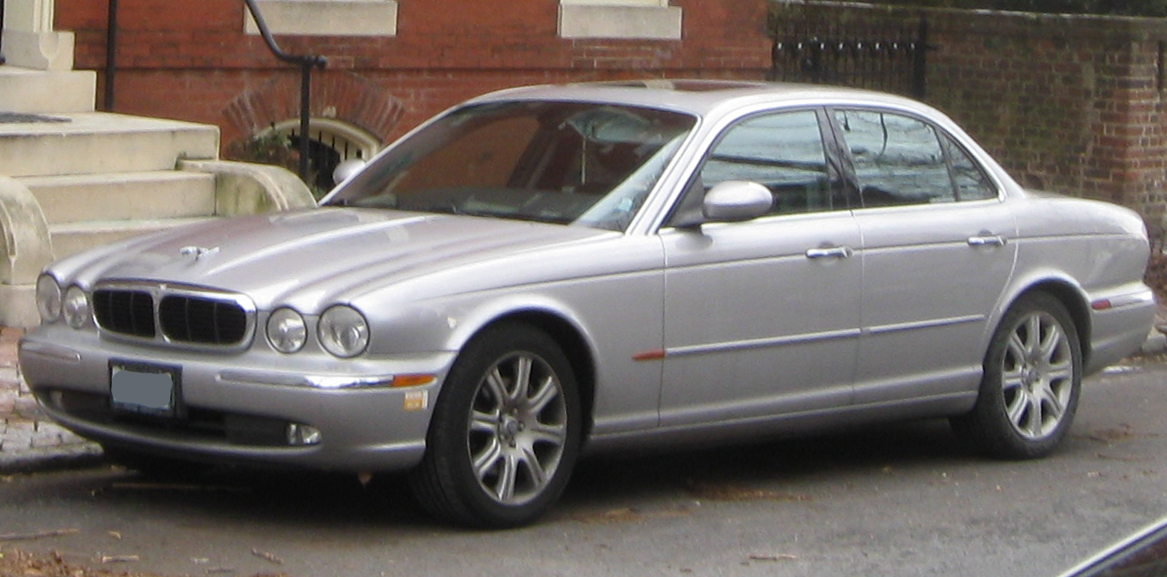
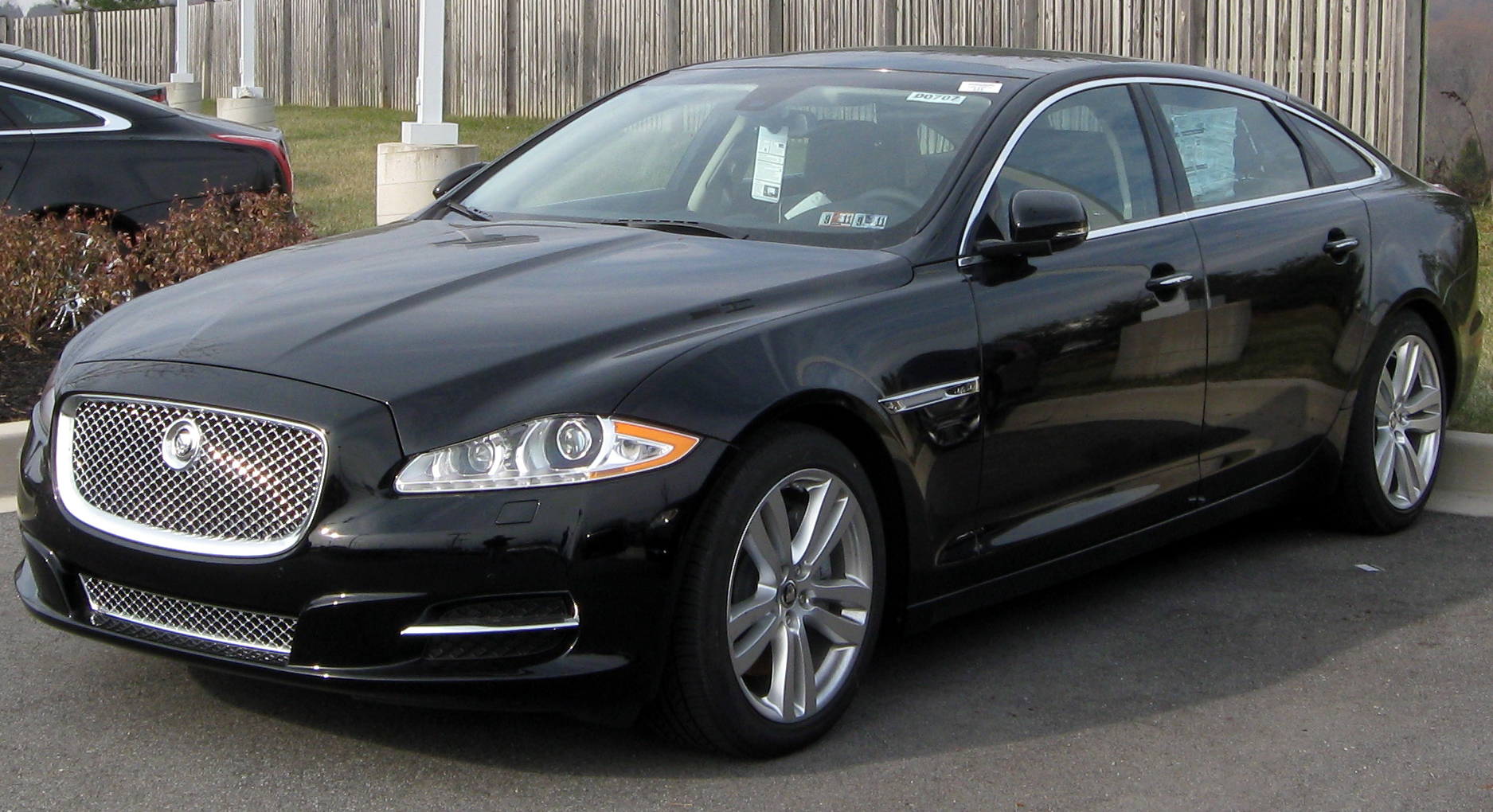
The X350/358 (top) were the last of retro-designed XJs before the X351 (bottom); the new Jaguar XF (X250) was the first of new-styled Jaguars. The conservative design for the X350 was polarising.

The XJ (X350) generally received positive reactions and compared well to its main competitors, while criticism rested on its conservative style design, which some critics said did not reflect the car's innovation and technology; to address this and increase sales, a facelift was available in 2007. A more radical, postmodern design was done for the XJ (X351), which nonetheless shared the X350's platform, and the X350 remained the last of retro-designed Jaguars. As of February 2010, it had sold 295,365 units.

Before its release in 2003, an X350 was tested by Jaguar historian Paul Skilleter. An X358 TDVi was featured in an episode of BBC 2's Top Gear. It was driven 750 miles on a single tank of fuel by Jeremy Clarkson from Basel to Blackpool. Despite coming second behind a VW Polo BlueMotion the presenters agreed that the Jaguar was "the true hero". Clarkson described the car as "astonishing". About the X350's all-alluminium body, Andrew Frankel of Hagerty wrote: "In fact the car was a revolution. Because beneath those golf club car park looks lurked what I believe to be the first entirely aluminum monocoque designed for a mass production road car [Editor's note: Technically the Honda NSX got there first, but it depends where you draw the line for 'mass production'....]."

The X350/358 models were generally praised. One criticism of the X350 was the rear legroom's space despite the car's length. This was improved in the X358.

Despite its similarity to the XJ (X308), the X350 was praised for its elegant styling, engine, technology, interior, and handling, while the rear legroom was relatively small considered the car's length. In his review of the 2003 Jaguar XJ8, Jonathan Hawley wrote: "When pushed hard over lumpy and twisting roads, the air suspension can get a little confused and produces some nasty thumping noises." In his review for NRMA, Bill McKinnon said: "The 3.5. likes to be revved and delivers its best when worked manually from 3500 rpm to the 6800 rpm redline... The big Jag still delivers a luxurious ride, though its aggressive wheel/tyre package makes you aware of the road surface to a greater extent than previous models. The air suspension is extremely effective at ironing out big impacts."

In his 2003 review for Motoring Research, Peter Burgess praised the X350's interior, as well as its engine for the sports car potential if revved and the quietness, attributing it to the car's light weight. He commended the X350 for being economical to run; the XJ6 tested in May 2003 averaged 23mpg on the 3.0-litre. He also positively reacted to the six-speed automatic transmission. Criticism rested on the rear legroom despite improvement and the lack of a full manual control of the automatic gearbox. Burgess concluded: "The big advantage that this Jaguar offers over and above the Audi A8, BMW 7 Series and Mercedes–Benz S–Class is a sense of individuality. This is a car which stands apart from the competition yet in most ways is their equal. While the Germans are caught in a technological spiral of ever–outdoing each other, the British car gets on with the job of looking after the driver and passenger is a rather charming way."

In a review of the 2008 XJ, Autoblog.com wrote: "Underway in town or on the highway, the XJ is smooth, quiet, stately and powerful, and it handles winding roads quite well for its size. It's easier to operate, certainly less complicated, than the BMW 7 Series, Audi A8, and Mercedes S-Class. It's less burdened with systems and processes that can frustrate with their complexity. The five XJ models are loaded with sophisticated safety and performance technology, mind you, but all that technology is tucked away in a less obtrusive fashion, and it generally works without annoyance or distraction. The XJs deliver the best EPA fuel mileage ratings in this class, and none carries a Gas Guzzler Tax."

Like many used luxury cars, the X350 has experienced significant depreciation on the used market. Classic Motoring concluded: "The X350 and the 358 facelift carries on the XJ's tradition by offering not only astonishing value but also a driving experience that few others can match let alone surpass." Prices starts as low as £1,500 to as high as £20,000 for the low-mileage, more luxurious models. In a 2007 review by Andy Enright for RAC, he concluded that "the Jaguar XJ makes a great used buy. It's reliable, well built and great fun to drive. Here's a British built car that knocks the Germans into a cocked hat."

In a 2017 retrospective for Honest John Classics, Craig Cheetham wrote: "Like all Jaguar XJs, the X350 offers fantastic ride quality, ironing out bumps like no other car, while maintaining the agility of a much smaller vehicle. Comfort and handling, then, are exemplary, as, indeed, is the luxury of the car's cabin. Indeed, the only real criticism of the X350 is that, in many ways, it was too traditional. Allegedly, there were some fairly senior people in Jaguar who hated it, because of its traditional appearance didn't do its technological advancement justice, nor do enough to attract new, younger buyers to the Jaguar brand. They had a point... but irrespective, the X350 is a wonderful, rewarding and cossetting car."
