= Platinum–samarium =

Names
- Other names Platinum-samarium (1/1)

Identifiers
CAS Number	12137-84-7
3D model (JSmol)	Interactive image
ChemSpider	57533995
PubChem CID	71352081
CompTox Dashboard (EPA)	DTXSID50777396
- InChI: InChI=1S/Pt.Sm Key: UJAPJHYGSSIPDS-UHFFFAOYSA-N
- SMILES: [Sm].[Pt]

Properties
Chemical formula	PtSm
Molar mass	345.44 g·mol^{−1}
Density	12.5 g/cm^{3}
Melting point	1,810 °C (3,290 °F; 2,080 K)

Structure
Crystal structure	orthorhombic
Space group	Pnma
Lattice constant	a = 0.7148 nm, b = 0.4501 nm, c = 0.5638 nm
Formula units (Z)	4 units per cell

Related compounds
Related compounds	Iron boride
- Except where otherwise noted, data are given for materials in their standard state (at 25 °C [77 °F], 100 kPa). Infobox references

Platinum-samarium is a binary inorganic compound of platinum and samarium with the chemical formula PtSm. This intermetallic compound forms orthorhombic crystals similar to that of iron boride (FeB).

== Synthesis ==
Platinum-samarium can be prepared by fusion at 1810 °C:

Pt + Sm → PtSm
