= Alonizing =

Alonizing is a diffusion metallizing process in that it is a thermochemical treatment that involves enriching the surface layer of an object with one or more metallic elements. Specifically, alonizing is the diffusion of aluminum into the surface of a base metal through high temperature vapors. The types of metals that can be alonized include all types of wrought and cast steels (i.e. plain carbon and low alloy grades, ferritic and austenitic steels, highly alloyed nickel-chromium steels, etc.). This process results in an alloy with the surface properties of aluminum while retaining the base metal's inherent strength and rigidity. Therefore, alonizing does not change the high-temperature mechanical properties of the base metal, which is the advantage of alonizing over simply creating an aluminum alloy (aluminizing the surface versus aluminum throughout the alloy).

== Process ==
The process consists of first placing the metal in an airtight vessel, called a retort. The metal is then encircled by a blend of aluminum powders. The retort is then closed and placed in a pressure-controlled kiln. At the elevated temperatures (typically greater than 300 °C, usually between 700 and 1100 °C) of the kiln, the aluminum is in its liquid phase and diffuses into the surface of the metal and forms an alloy with the substrate. This alloy usually contains a minimum of 20 percent aluminum. Conventional case depth for carbon and alloy steel is 0.0127-0.0508 centimeters, and for stainless and nickel base alloys is 0.00508-0.0254 centimeters.

After cooling, the metal is removed from the retort and from the excess powder. At this point, additional secondary operations are performed as needed. This process ensures uniform alloy protection over the entire surface of the base metal.

== Purpose ==
The purpose of the alonizing process is to improve the base metal's heat and corrosion resistance by providing a protective diffusion layer of aluminum alloyed with the base metal at the surface. This layer remains effective at all temperatures up to the melting point of the base metal. Since the layer created is an alloy with the base metal, the layer cannot be removed without a machining process.

The protective diffusion layer provides the following corrosion protection properties:

- Sulfidation Resistance – protection from hydrogen sulfide, hyposulfurous, and sulfurous acid attack
- Oxidation Resistance – aluminum oxide forms stable coating
- Carburization Resistance – resists carbon diffusion
- Hydrogen Permeation – reduces rate of hydrogen diffusion

The reason aluminum is used to form the alloy is because it is very corrosion resistant itself. When oxygen is present, aluminum reacts to form an aluminum oxide layer, which is chemically bound to the surface and seals the core aluminum from any further reaction. Therefore, diffusing aluminum into a base metal increases its corrosion resistance. However, the alloys formed are extremely variable because they vary not only in the types of metals being alonized, but also in the amount of time spent alonizing and hence the time allotted for aluminum to diffuse into the surface (resulting in varying percentages of aluminum in the resulting alloys). The type of metal that should be chosen for the alonized process depends on the desired application, since the resulting alloy retains similar properties of the base metal, including temperature it can withstand, strength, ductility, its own corrosion properties, etc. Though corrosion protection properties are gained, the chemicals and gases that typically corrode aluminum are not resisted. The amount of time spent alonizing also depends on the desired application considering the amount of corrosion resistance desired to gain versus some of the negative effects that can come with aluminum including softness, brittleness, and precipitation.

== Applications ==
Alonized materials are used most commonly in tubing and piping utilized in corrosive environments. These types of tubing and piping include furnace tubes, reformer tubes, heat exchanger tubes, waste gas heater tubes, line pipe and downhole tubes for wells and production vessels, sulphur condensers and piping used in oil and chemical production and power generation and wrought metal products, bars, rods, plates and sheets, panels, water well panels, and wire screens and metal castings by adding aluminum or aluminum and silicon corrosion and erosion preventive diffusion coatings.
