= Boron steel =

Steel alloy with small amount of boron

Boron steel is steel alloyed with a small amount of boron, usually less than 1%. The addition of boron to steel greatly increases the hardenability of the resulting alloy.

== Description ==
Boron is added to steel as ferroboron (~12-24% B). As the ferroboron addition lacks protective elements it is usually added after oxygen scavengers have been added. Proprietary additives also exist with oxygen/nitrogen scavengers – one such contains 2% B plus Al, Ti, Si. Oxygen, carbon, and nitrogen react with boron in steel to form B_{2}O_{3} (boron trioxide); Fe_{3}(CB) (iron boroncementite) and Fe_{23}(CB)_{6} (iron boroncarbide); and BN (boron nitride) respectively.

=== Hardenability ===
Soluble boron arranges in steels along grain boundaries. This inhibits the γ-α transformations (austenite to ferrite transformation) by diffusion and therefore increases the hardenability, with an optimal range of ~ 0.0003 to 0.003% B. Additionally Fe_{2}B has been found to precipitate at grain boundaries, which may also retard the γ-α transformations . At higher B values Fe_{23}(CB)_{6} is thought to form, which promotes ferrite nucleation, and so adversely affects hardenability.

Boron is effective at very low concentrations – 30 ppm B can replace an equivalent 0.4% Cr, 0.5% C, or 0.12% V. 30 ppm B has also been shown to increase depth of hardening (~ +50%) in a low-alloy steel – thought to be due to its retardation of austenite decomposition to softer bainite, ferrite, or pearlite structures on cooling from an austenitization treatment.

The presence of carbon in steel reduces the relative effectiveness of boron in promoting hardenability.

At above 30 ppm boron begins to reduce hardenability, increases brittleness, and can cause hot shortness.

=== Phase diagram ===
The Fe-B phase diagram has two eutectic points – at 17% (mol) m.p. 1149 °C; and 63.5% boron m.p. ~1500 °C. There is a peak m.p. at 1:1 Fe:B, and an inflexion at 33% B, corresponding to FeB and Fe_{2}B respectively.

The solubility of boron in steel is thought to be 0.021% at 1149 °C, dropping to 0.0021% at 906 °C. At 710 °C only 0.00004% boron dissolves in γ-Fe (Austenite).

== Uses ==
Boron alloy steels include carbon, low alloy including HSLA, carbon-manganese and tool steels. Because of boron's high neutron absorption boron is added to stainless steels used in the nuclear industry – up to 4% but more typically 0.5 to 1%.

Boron steels find use in the car industry, typically as strengthening elements such as around door frames and in reclining seats. As of the mid 2000s it was in common use by European car manufacturers. The introduction of boron steel elements introduced issues for accident scene rescuers as its high strength and hardness resisted many conventional cutting tools (hydraulic rescue tools) in use at that time.

Flat boron steel for automotive use is hot stamped in cooled molds from the austentic state (obtained by heating to 900-950 °C). A typical steel 22MnB5 shows a 2.5x increase in tensile strength after this process, from a base of 600MPa. Stamping can be done in an inert atmosphere, otherwise abrasive scale forms – alternatively a protective Al-Si coating can be used. (see aluminized steel). Introduction of high tensile strength hot stamped mild manganese boron steel (22MnB5) (up to proof strength 1200MPa, ultimate tensile strength 1500MPa) allowed weight saving through down gauging in the European car industry.

Boron steel is used in the shackles of some padlocks for cut resistance Boron steel padlocks of sufficient shackle thickness (15mm or more) are highly hacksaw, bolt cutter, and hammer-resistant, although they can be defeated with an angle grinder.

Boron steel flats, typically 30MnB5 modified with an addition of 0.5% chromium are used in the manufacture of fork arms for forklift trucks.

== See also ==
- Boriding
- Iron boride
