= Alternate line service =

Alternate Line service is a GSM feature for supporting two different phone numbers for voice service on the same mobile device.

The Alternate Line Service (ALS) was introduced as additional service with the former "PCS-1800" (now better known as GSM1800) standard, in a specification called CPHS. This is the reason that GSM900 singleband phones do not support this feature, while the corresponding GSM1800 version often does (e.g. Ericsson GH-337 vs. PH-337). Later it became part of the GSM-Specs and was adapted even by some traditional GSM900 providers, e.g. A1(AT) and orange, also in AT.

As of 2010, this service does not work currently with Android devices.

== Support to date ==
- Supported by many, but not all, GSM mobile devices.
- Some, but not all, mobile devices support different ring tones for different lines.
- Supported by many, but not all, GSM service providers.
