= Antibodies from lymphocyte secretions =

The antibodies from lymphocyte secretions (ALS) assay is an immunological assay to detect active diseases like tuberculosis, cholera, typhoid etc. Recently, ALS assay nods the scientific community as it is rapidly used for diagnosis of Tuberculosis. The principle is based on the secretion of antibody from in vivo activated plasma B cells found in blood circulation for a short period of time in response to TB-antigens during active TB infection rather than latent TB infection.

== Procedure ==
PBMCs were separated from blood on Ficoll-Paque by differential centrifugation and were suspended in 24-well tissue culture plates culture medium. Different dilutions of PBMCs were incubated at 37 °C with 5% CO_{2}. Culture supernatants were collected at 24, 48, 72, and 96 h after incubation and the supernatants were test against BCG or PPD by ELISA. The ELISA titer indicate the positive or negative result.

== Advantages in TB diagnosis ==
The main advantages are High Sensitivity >93 %, Early detection of active TB. This method does not require a specimen taken from the site of disease, it also may be useful in diagnosis of paucibacillary childhood TB. Secreted antibody may be preserved for long time for further analysis.

== Pitfalls ==
This method cannot be applied if Mantoux test (tuberculin skin test) has been done within the last 40 days, because it can hamper the results of the ALS test. This test is used as a complementary test to other tests, e.g. chest X-ray, ESR, CRP, history of contact with active TB case, failure with conventional antibiotic treatment etc.; anti-TB therapy is not provided if only ALS test is positive. The reason is that this method is potentially an early biomarker of active infection. However, if a subject does not show any physical symptoms, the doctors cannot prescribe anti-TB treatment.
