= Boriding =

Surface hardening method

Boriding, also called boronizing, is the process by which boron is added to a metal or alloy. It is a type of surface hardening. In this process boron atoms are diffused into the surface of a metal component. The resulting surface contains metal borides, such as iron borides, nickel borides, and cobalt borides. As pure materials, these borides have extremely high hardness and wear resistance. Their favorable properties are manifested even when they are a small fraction of the bulk solid. Boronized metal parts are extremely wear-resistant and will often last two to five times longer than components treated with conventional heat treatments such as hardening, carburizing, nitriding, nitrocarburizing, or induction hardening. Most borided steel surfaces will have iron boride layer hardnesses of 1200–1600 HV. Nickel-based superalloys such as Inconel and Hastalloys will typically have nickel boride layer hardnesses of 1700–2300 HV.

== Methods ==
Boriding can be achieved in several ways, but commonly the metal piece is packed with a boriding mixture and heated at 900 °C. A typical boriding mixture consists of boron carbide powder diluted with other refractory materials. The process converts some of the iron to iron boride, consisting of two phases: FeB concentrated near the surface, and diiron boride (Fe_{2}B). Boride layer depths can range from 0.001 to 0.015 inches (25 to 381 μm) depending on base material selection and treatment.

=== Materials ===
It is often used on steel, but is applicable to a variety of alloys and cermet materials. A wide range of materials suitable for treatment including plain carbon steels, alloy steels, tool steels, nickel-based super alloys, cobalt alloys, and stellite.

=== Properties conferred ===
Boriding gives the material the following desirable properties: wear resistance, improved hardness (1300–2000HV is possible), thermal stability, resistance to corrosion by acids, reduced coefficient of friction, and increased galling/cold-welding resistance. It is possible to combine boriding with other heat treatments such as carburizing, hardening, or induction hardening to create deeper wear layers or high core hardness.

== See also ==
- Boron steel
