= Iron boride =

Diiron boride
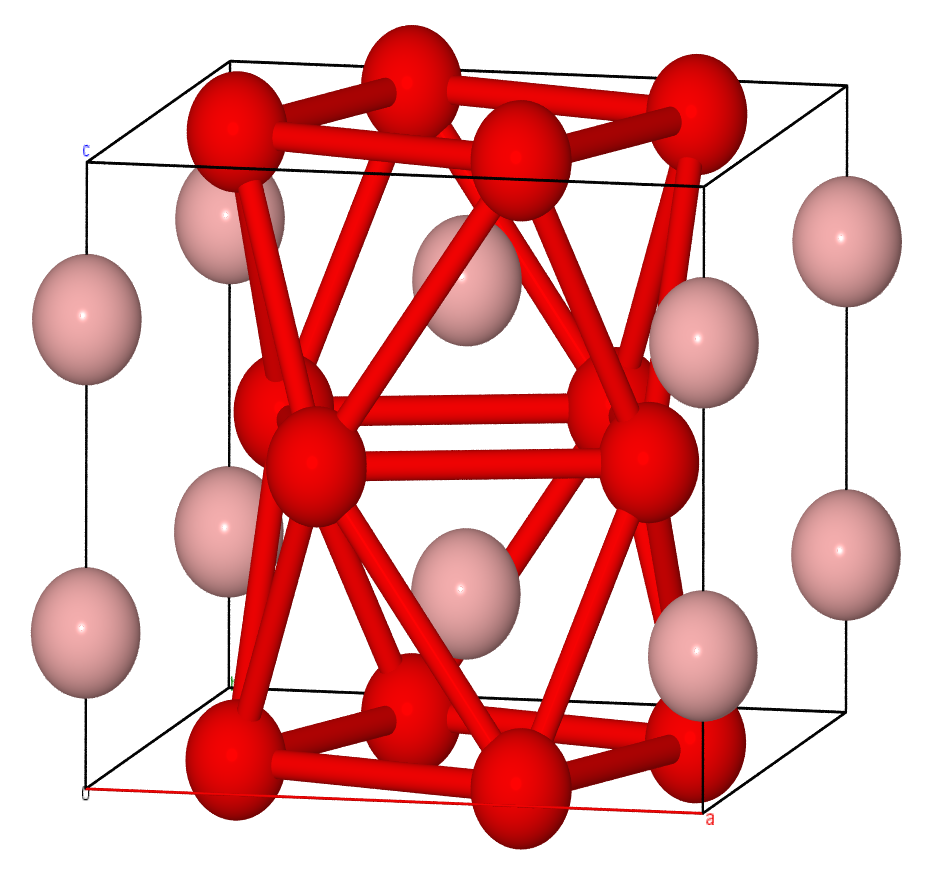

Names
- IUPAC name Iron boride
- Other names Diiron boride, Fe_{2}B

Identifiers
CAS Number	Fe_{2}B: 12006-85-8; FeB: 12006-84-7
3D model (JSmol)	Fe_{2}B: Interactive image; FeB: Interactive image
ChemSpider	Fe_{2}B: 4891846; FeB: 74711
EC Number	Fe_{2}B: 234-490-4; FeB: 234-489-9
PubChem CID	Fe_{2}B: 6336853; FeB: 82789
CompTox Dashboard (EPA)	Fe_{2}B: DTXSID401015517; FeB: DTXSID9065154
- InChI: Fe_{2}B: InChI=1S/B.Fe Key: ZDVYABSQRRRIOJ-UHFFFAOYSA-N; FeB: InChI=1S/B.2Fe Key: FSDZRQFSRALZQJ-UHFFFAOYSA-N
- SMILES: Fe_{2}B: [B].[Fe].[Fe]; FeB: [B]#[Fe]

Properties
Chemical formula	Fe_{2}B
Molar mass	122.501 g/mol
Appearance	refractory solid
Density	7.3 g/cm^{3}
Melting point	1,389 °C (2,532 °F; 1,662 K)
Solubility in water	insoluble

Structure
Crystal structure	Tetragonal, tI12
Space group	I4/mc, No. 140
Lattice constant	a = 0.511 nm, b = 0.511 nm, c = 0.4249 nm
Formula units (Z)	4
- Except where otherwise noted, data are given for materials in their standard state (at 25 °C [77 °F], 100 kPa). Infobox references

Iron boride
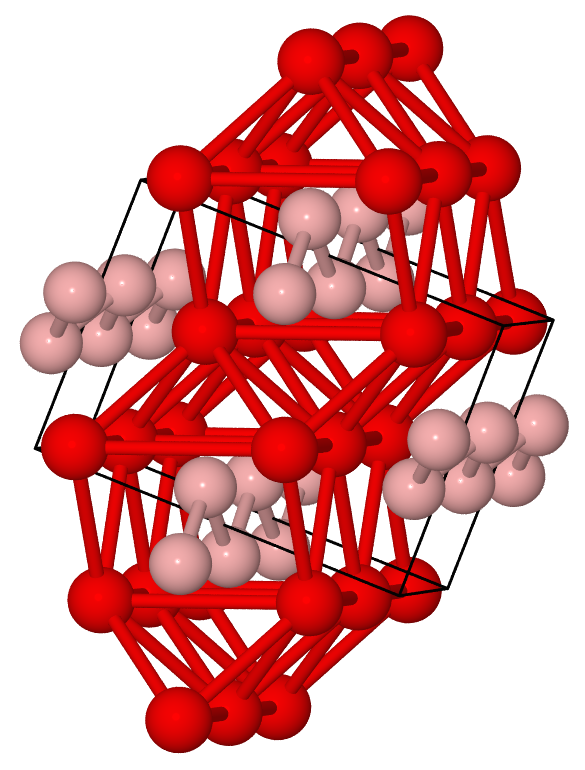
- Iron boride structure

Names
- IUPAC name Iron boride
- Other names Iron monoboride, FeB

Identifiers
CAS Number	FeB: 12006-84-7; Fe_{2}B: 12006-85-8
3D model (JSmol)	FeB: Interactive image; Fe_{2}B: Interactive image
ChemSpider	FeB: 74711; Fe_{2}B: 4891846
EC Number	FeB: 234-489-9; Fe_{2}B: 234-490-4
PubChem CID	FeB: 82789
- InChI: FeB: InChI=1S/B.Fe Key: ZDVYABSQRRRIOJ-UHFFFAOYSA-N; Fe_{2}B: InChI=1S/B.2Fe Key: FSDZRQFSRALZQJ-UHFFFAOYSA-N
- SMILES: FeB: [B].[Fe]; Fe_{2}B: [B].[Fe].[Fe]

Properties
Chemical formula	FeB
Molar mass	66.656
Appearance	grey powder
Density	~7 g/cm^{3}
Melting point	1,658 °C (3,016 °F; 1,931 K)
Solubility in water	insoluble

Structure
Crystal structure	Orthorhombic, oP8
Space group	Pnma, No. 62
Lattice constant	a = 0.4061 nm, b = 0.5506 nm, c = 0.2952 nm
Formula units (Z)	4
- Except where otherwise noted, data are given for materials in their standard state (at 25 °C [77 °F], 100 kPa). Infobox references

Iron boride refers to various inorganic compounds with the formula Fe_{x}B_{y}. Two main iron borides are FeB and Fe_{2}B. Some iron borides possess useful properties such as magnetism, electrical conductivity, corrosion resistance and extreme hardness. Some iron borides have found use as hardening coatings for iron. Iron borides have properties of ceramics such as high hardness, and properties of metal, such as thermal conductivity and electrical conductivity. Boride coatings on iron are superior mechanical, frictional, and anti-corrosive. Iron monoboride (FeB) is a grey powder that is insoluble in water. FeB is harder than Fe_{2}B, but is more brittle and more easily fractured upon impact.

== Formation ==
=== Thermochemical formation ===
Iron borides can be formed by thermochemically reacting boron rich compounds on an iron surface to form a mixture of iron borides, in a process known as boriding. There are a number of ways of forming boride coatings, including gas boriding, molten salt boriding, and pack boriding. Typically carbon tetraboride (B_{4}C) or crystalline boron, is sintered on the iron surface in a tetrafluoroborate flux to form the coatings. The boron atoms diffuse into the iron substrate between 1023 and 1373 K. They first form layers of Fe_{2}B and then form layers of FeB.The range of compounds and compositions formed depends on the reaction conditions including temperature and surrounding environment.

Bulk FeB can be formed by simple reaction between iron and boron in a high-temperature inert gas furnace or in a microwave.

=== Synthesis ===
Iron boride nanoparticles have been formed by reducing iron boride salts in highly coordinating solvents using sodium borohydride. They have also been prepared by reducing iron salts using sodium borohydride:

4 FeSO_{4} + 8 NaBH_{4} +18 H_{2}O → 2 Fe_{2}B + 6 B(OH)_{3} + 25 H_{2} + 4 Na_{2}SO_{4}

== Structure and properties ==
The structures of FeB and Fe_{2}B were known to be interstitial in early studies. FeB is orthorhombic and Fe_{2}B adopts body-centered tetragonal structure.

=== Fe_{2}B ===
Fe_{2}B contains single boron atoms in square anti-prismatic iron atom coordination. Boron atoms are separated from each other and the shortest B-B distance is 213 pm. Fe-B distance is 218 pm and Fe-Fe distance is 240–272 pm.

Fe_{2}B is a ferromagnetic compound that becomes paramagnetic at temperatures above 742 °C (1368 °F). In air, Fe_{2}B powders begin to react with the ambient oxygen above 400 °C. The high hardness of Fe2B (18.7 GPa or 1907 HV as measured by Vickers indentation) is why homogeneous Fe_{2}B layers are formed on top of iron or steel by boriding to make them more wear resistant.

== Applications ==
Boriding, also called boronizing, is often used to improve abrasion resistance, corrosion resistance, wear resistance, and oxidation resistance. It is used in oil and gas refinery, chemical extraction, automotive, agricultural, stamping, textile extrusion and injection molding industries.

Iron based coatings recently gained attention for their mechanical, frictional, and corrosion resistant properties. As compared to the ceramic or cermet type of materials people have used before, iron based materials are relatively inexpensive, less strategic, and can be produced economically by various thermal methods with ease of fabrication and machining.

== See also ==
- Boron steel
- Iron tetraboride
