= Anglia Ruskin University Faculty of Business and Law =

Business school in England

Faculty of Business and Law
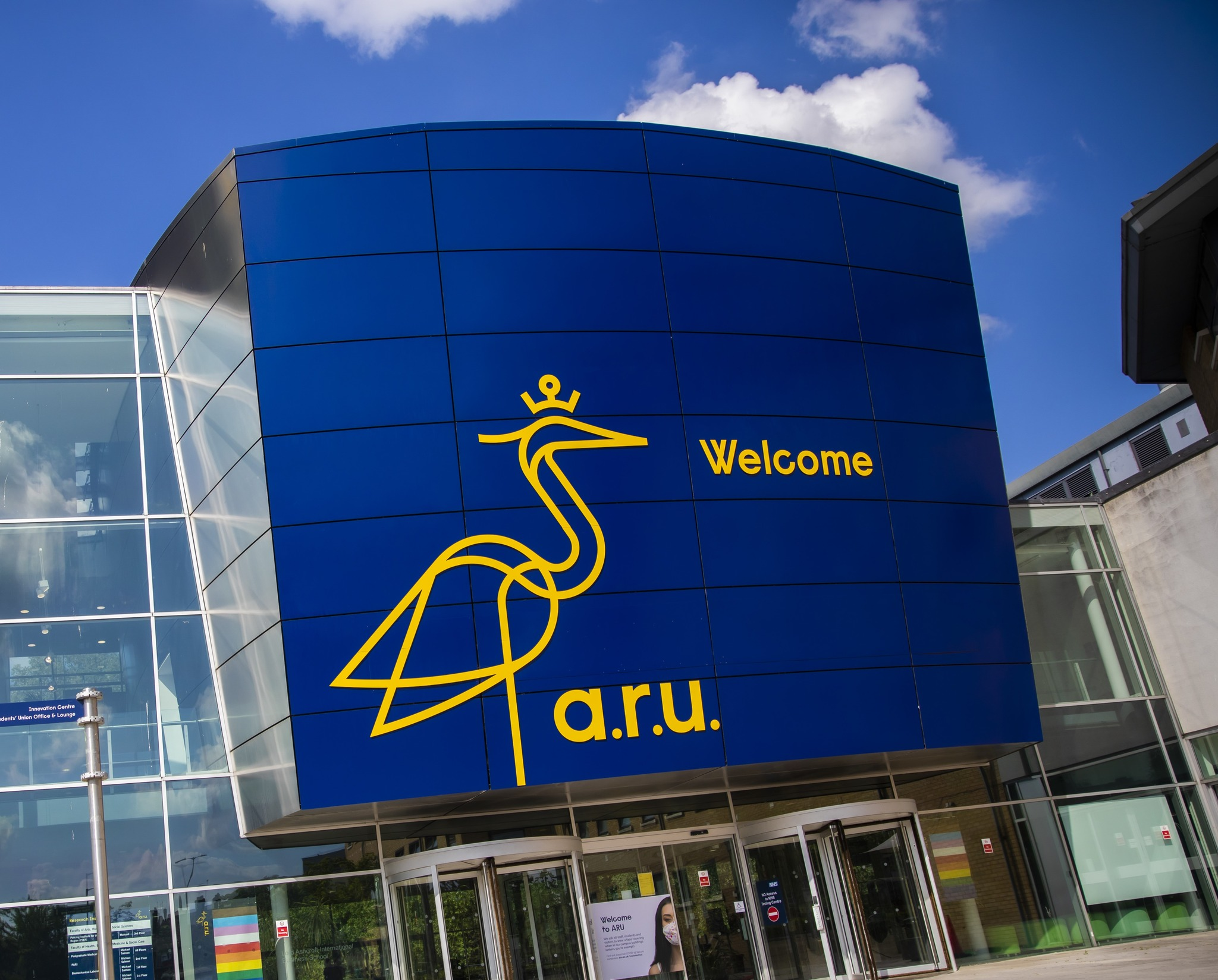
- Former name: Lord Ashcroft International Business School
- Type: Business school; university faculty
- Established: 1992
- Affiliations: CIMA, ACCA, CMI, ABS, PRME, AIESEC
- Dean: Mohammad Ali
- Students: 7200
- Location: Cambridge, Chelmsford, London & Peterborough, United Kingdom
- Campus: Urban
- Website: https://aru.ac.uk/business-and-law

The Anglia Ruskin University Faculty of Business and Law, formerly known as the Lord Ashcroft International Business School (LAIBS), is a faculty at Anglia Ruskin University (ARU). It comprises two schools: the School of Economics, Finance and Law and the School of Management. Currently, ARU operates business schools in Cambridge, Chelmsford, Peterborough, and London.

The Faculty of Business and Law is one of the largest in East England, featuring nearly 100 full-time teaching staff and approximately 7,200 students from over 100 countries. It also offers business programs through partnerships with institutions worldwide.

== Business Schools ==
ARU has business schools located in Cambridge, Chelmsford, Peterborough, and London.

In London, ARU has two campuses. The Farringdon Building is situated on Charterhouse Street in Holborn, which borders the City of London. The East India Building is located in the former East India Docks, next to Canary Wharf in the London Borough of Tower Hamlets.

== Business Degrees at Anglia Ruskin University ==
- BSc (Hons) Finance and Accounting
- BSc (Hons) Business with Economics
- BSc (Hons) Finance with Economics
- BSc (Hons) Business with Entrepreneurship
- BSc (Hons) Banking with Finance
- BSc (Hons Business and Law
- BSc (Hons) Human Resource Management
- BSc (Hons) Business and Management
- BSc (Hons) Business and Healthcare Management
- BSc (Hons) Business and Hospitality Management
- BSc (Hons) Marketing
- BSc (Hons) Digital Marketing
- BSc (Hons) Business and Finance
- BSc (Hons) Events Management
- BSc (Hons) Project Management
- BSc (Hons) Business with Events Management
- BSc (Hons) Business and Marketing
- BSc (Hons) Business and Tourism Management
- BSc (Hons) Supply Chain Management
- MSc Business Data Analytics
- MSc Marketing
- MSc Project Management
- MSc International Business Management
- MSc Sustainable Supply Chain Management
- MBA Master of Business Administration
- MBA Entrepreneurship
- MBA Finance

At ARU's Doctoral School, students can pursue a PhD in Business and Management or a Doctor of Business Administration (DBA).

== Buildings ==
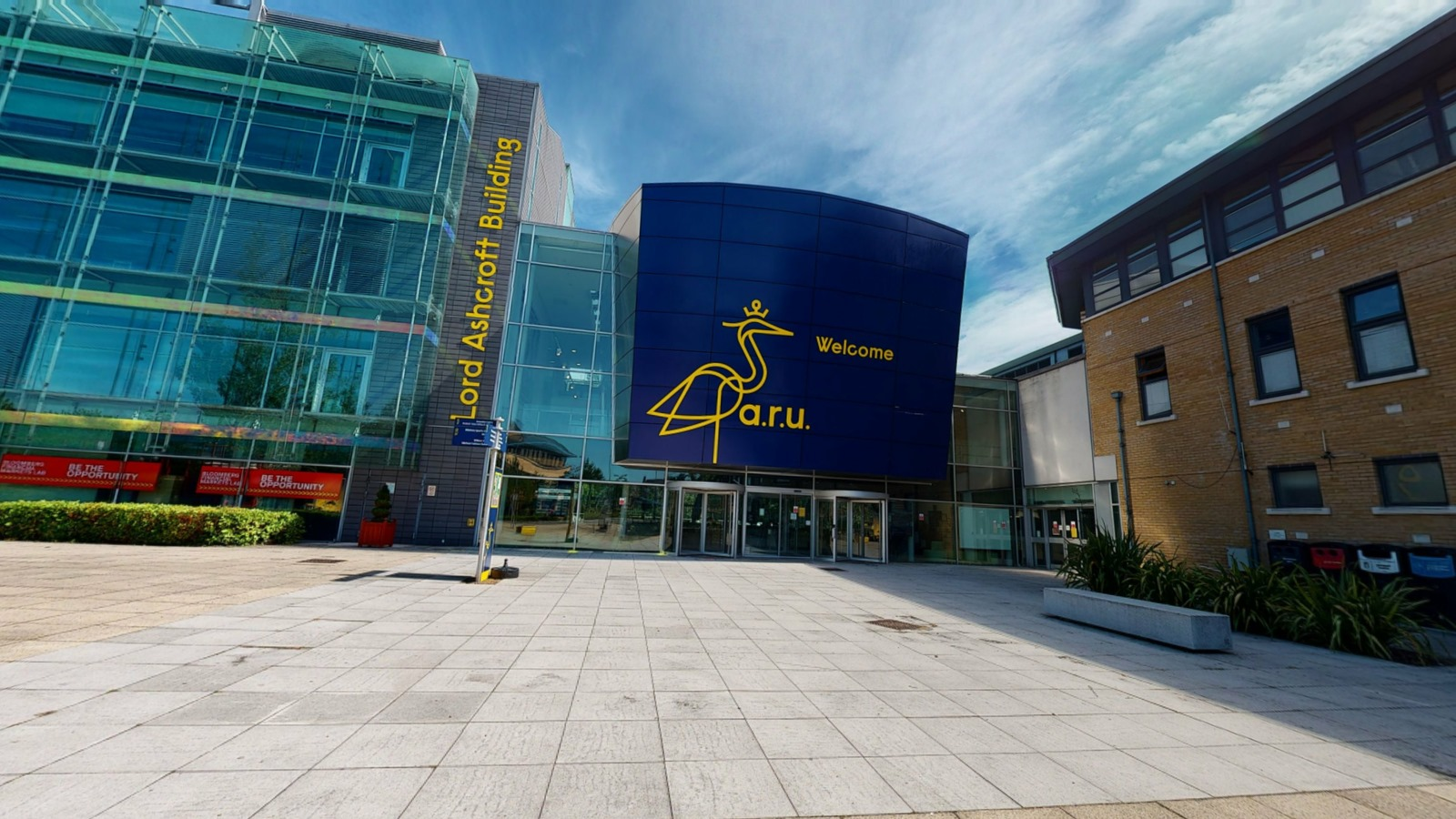
Lord Ashcroft Building in Chelmsford, Essex. The building was inaugurated by Prince Edward in 2003.

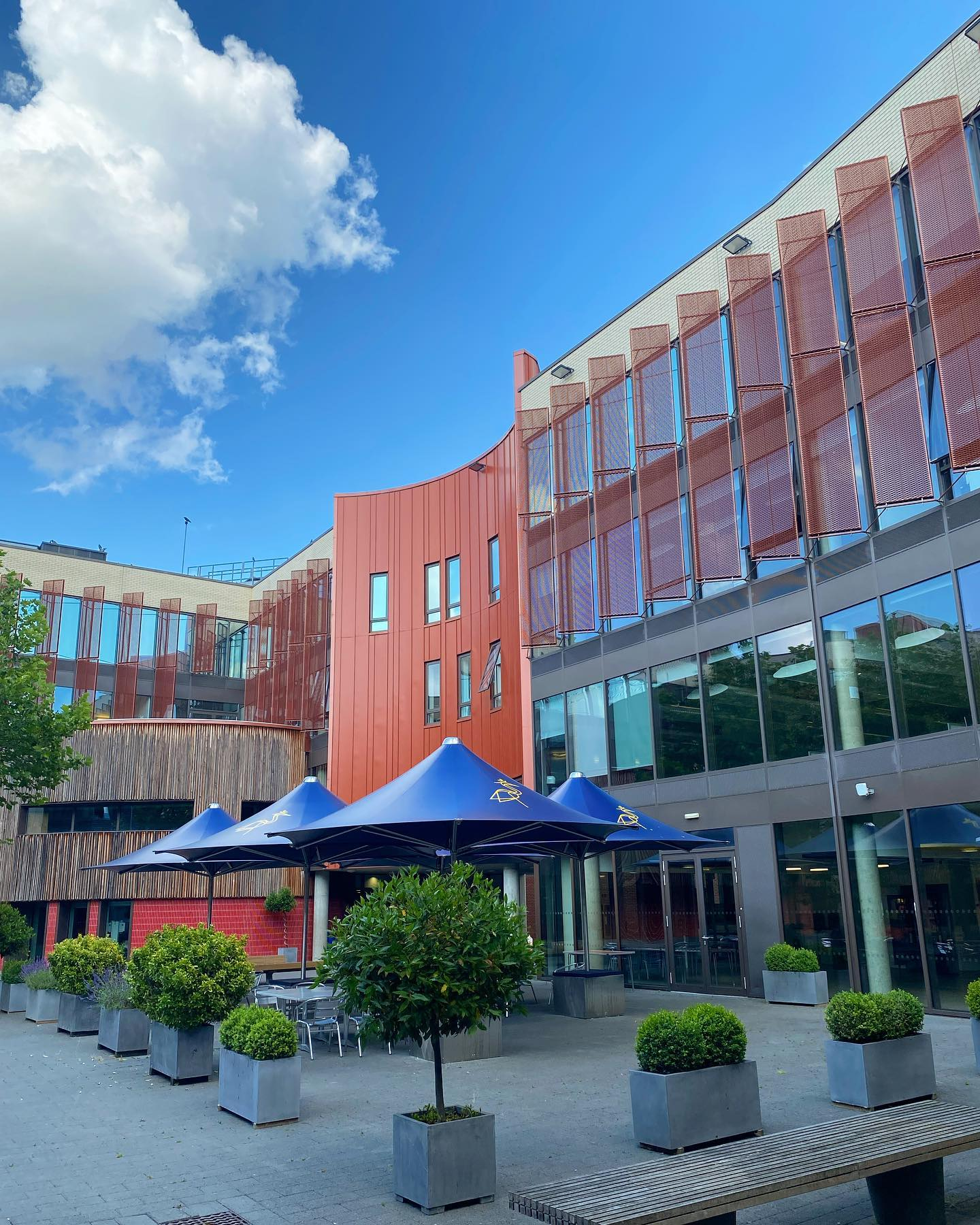
Lord Ashcroft Building, seat of the business school, as seen from inside the campus in Cambridge.

The Lord Ashcroft Buildings are situated at both ARU Cambridge and ARU Chelmsford. Lord Michael Ashcroft, who was the chancellor of the university at the time, contributed £10 million towards the construction of these business school facilities. The Chelmsford building was inaugurated by Prince Edward in 2003, while the Cambridge building opened in 2011. Notably, the facade of the Cambridge business school still displays its former name.

Originally, the Chelmsford building was named the Michael A. Ashcroft Building, and the business school was called the Michael Ashcroft International Business School. After Ashcroft was elevated to life peerage in 2000, the business school was renamed the Lord Ashcroft International Business School.

In 2014, the Bloomberg Financial Markets Lab was opened for finance, banking, accounting, and economics students at the Chelmsford campus.

== Research Centers ==
In 2025, the Faculty of Business and Law had five research centers:

- Anglia Ruskin Innovation Centre (ARIC)
- Centre for Access to Justice and Inclusion (CAJI)
- Centre for Inclusive Societies and Economies (CISE)
- Centre for Intelligent Supply Chains (CISC)
- Centre for Research into the Organization of Work and Consumption (CROWC)

== Anglia Ruskin Enterprise Academy ==
The Anglia Ruskin University Enterprise Academy (AREA) promotes entrepreneurship and is recognised by both the Institute of Enterprise and Entrepreneurs (IOEE) and the National Centre for Entrepreneurship in Education (NCEE).

#ThinkBigARU is a business competition organised by AREA for students and recent graduates.

AREA serves as a business incubator for startups.

- Accounting
- Web development
- Graphic design
- Social media marketing

In 2025, AREA received the Vice Chancellor's Award.

== Arise Innovations Hubs ==
Arise Innovations Hubs are located in Chelmsford and Harlow in Essex. Arise provides an ecosystem for entrepreneurs.

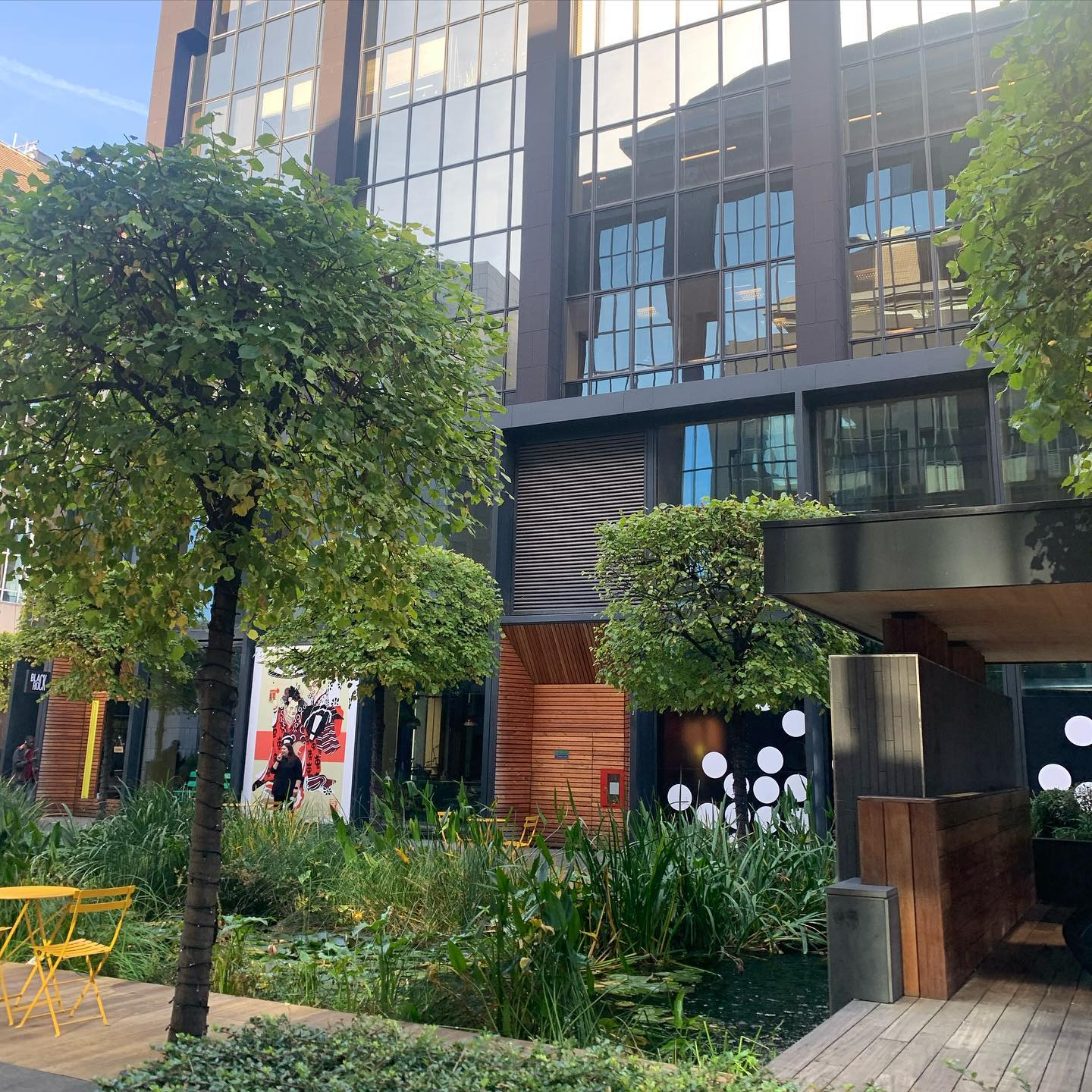
ARU East India Campus in London.

== Partnerships ==
Past and present partners include Barclays, Harrods, Triangular Alliance, British Armed Forces, Russian Railways, UPS, Timberland, Volvo, and other brands.

== Affiliations ==
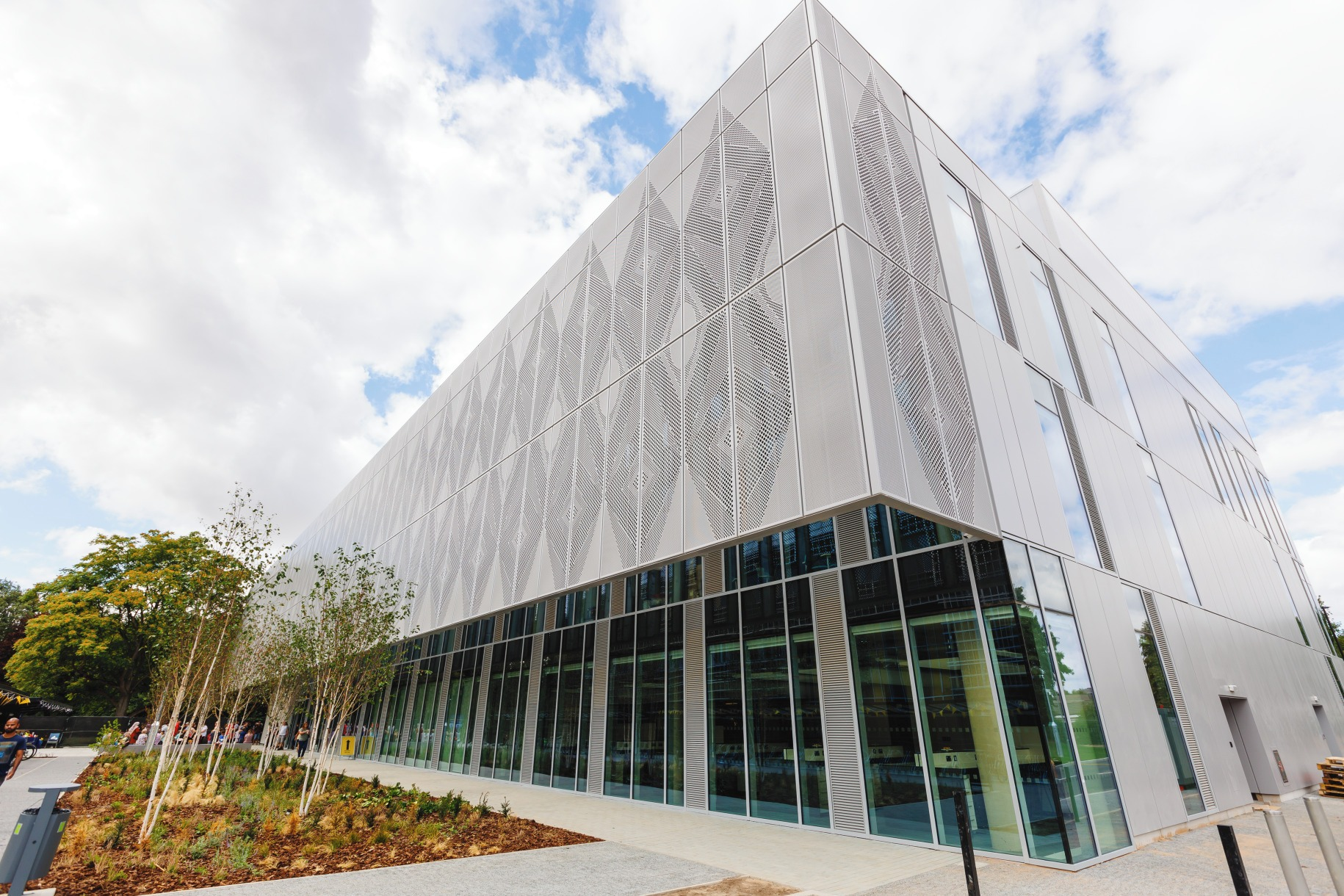
ARU in Peterborough in Cambridgeshire.

ARU is a member of the European Foundation for Management Development, and several programs within the faculty hold accreditation from professional bodies such as the Association of Chartered Certified Accountants and the Chartered Institute of Management Accountants. Additionally, all courses are accredited by the Chartered Management Institute. In 2023, ARU established a partnership with the Chartered Institute for Securities & Investment.

== Awards ==
- In 2014, Anglia Ruskin University was announced as the winner of the Entrepreneurial University of the Year at the Times Higher Education Awards.
- In 2016, the university won the Duke of York Award for University Entrepreneurship at the Lloyds Bank National Business Awards.
- In 2022, Anglia Ruskin’s Faculty of Business and Law received the Small Business Charter Award.
- In 2023, Anglia Ruskin University was awarded the top prize as the University of the Year at the Times Higher Education Awards.
- In 2024, Anglia Ruskin University became the first university in the United Kingdom to win the National Centre for Entrepreneurship in Education (NCEE) Entrepreneurial University Award.
- In 2025, Law Clinic at the Faculty of Business and Law was a finalist for the University Commercial Impact Award at the LexisNexis Legal Awards.
- In 2025, ARU was a finalist for three awards: Co-created Employability Initiatives, Employer and Community Partnerships, and Enterprise and Entrepreneurship at the Academic Employability Awards.
- In 2025, ARU was a finalist at the Medilink Midlands Business Awards for Partnership Between University and Business Award.

== Rankings ==
- In 2024, the Higher Education Statistics Agency (HESA) revelead that ARU was in top 10% in the country for graduates in employment and/or further study. ARU was ranked 5th in the country and 1st in the East of England for graduates who are employed as managers, directors or senior officials.
- In 2024, Anglia Ruskin University was ranked among the top 6.8% of universities worldwide.
- ARU was first in the East of England, and seventh in the UK, for student start-ups, with 123 ventures formed in the 2023/24 academic year.

=== Controversies ===
In March 2018, Lord Ashcroft graduate Pok Wong, from Hong Kong, initiated a lawsuit against Anglia Ruskin University (ARU) for allegedly misrepresenting the career prospects associated with her degree.

In 2024, ARU London accidentally paid £50,000 to the Conservative Party. The donation was intended as a personal contribution from the chairman of ARU London Ravi Gill.

== Alumni ==
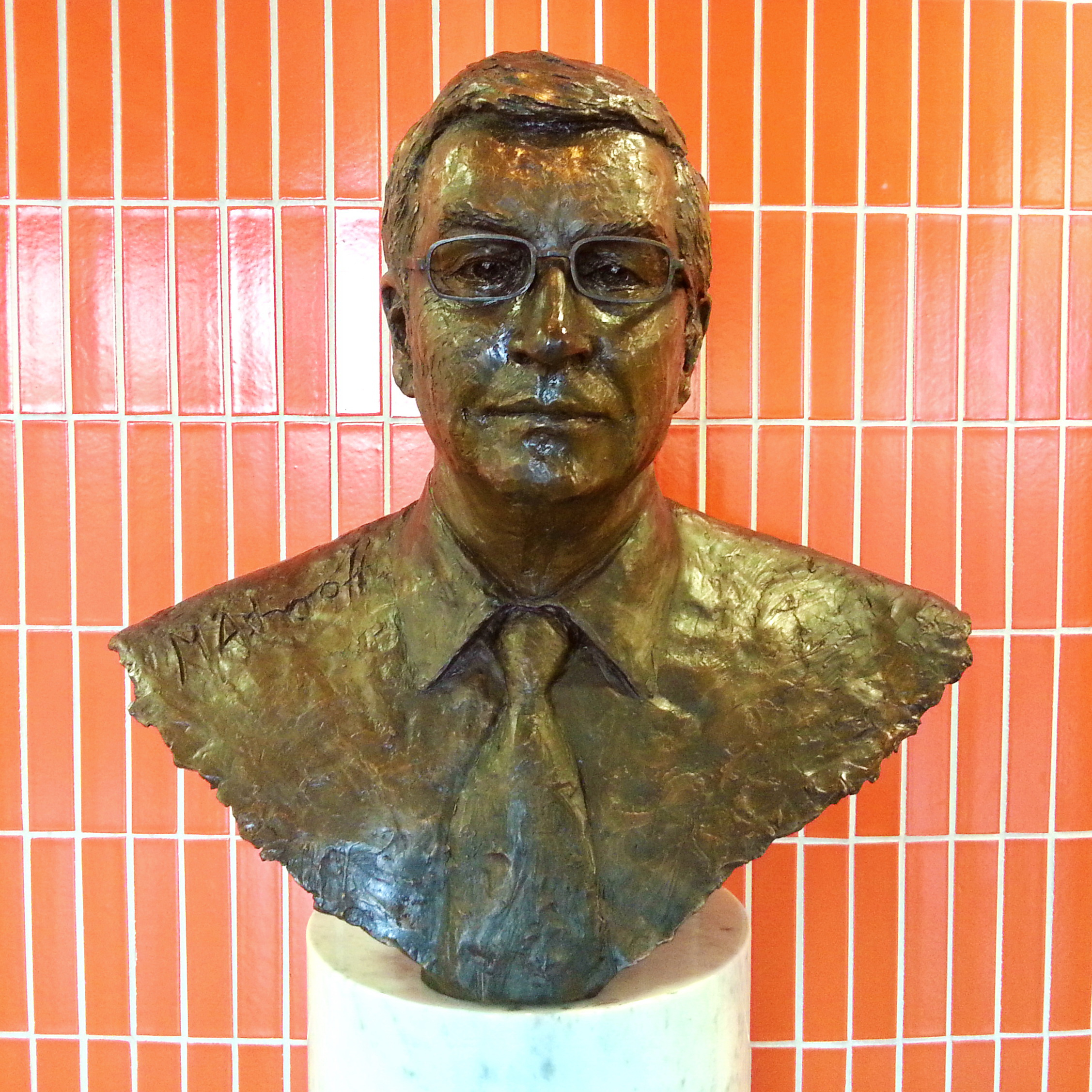
The bust of Lord Michael Ashcroft at the Lord Ashcroft Building, Anglia Ruskin University in Cambridge.

- Jukka Aminoff FRSA — author
- Michael Ashcroft, Baron Ashcroft — English investor, billionaire and former Conservative vice chairman
- Chris Beckett — academic, author and science-fiction novelist
- John Burnside — academic and T. S. Eliot winner author
- Geraldine Finlayson — researcher and director of John Mackintosh Hall
- Angela Hartnett — entrepreneur and chef
- Kim Howells — Labour politician and former Chair of the Intelligence and Security Committee
- Hussain Mohamed Latheef, Vice President of Maldives
- Anders Holch Povlsen — owner and CEO of Bestseller
- Nicky Richards — CEO and chief investment officer MLC Asset Management
- Andrew Sayer — English economist, professor of social theory and political economy at Lancaster University
- Ronald Searle — creator of St Trinian’s
- Patricia Scotland — Baroness Scotland of Asthal, secretary-general of the Commonwealth of Nations, Labour politician, government policy-maker, former minister, attorney general and president of Chatham House
- Tim Stokely — founder of OnlyFans
- Mark Wood — businessman, accountant and chairman of NSPCC

== Honorary Doctors ==
- Keith Attwood
- Alan Barrell
- Christopher Collins
- Peter Cowley
- Ravi Gill
- Joe Greenwell
- Dido Harding
- Hermann Hauser
- Andy Hill
- Anya Hindmarch
- Anders Holch Povlsen
- Andrew Marsden
- Felicia Odamtten
- Andrew Sentance
- Brian Tattersfield
- Bob Weston
- Andy Wood
