= Anglia Ruskin University =

British university

Coordinates: 52°12′11.1″N 0°8′1.3″E

- Coat of arms
- Former name: See history
- Motto: Excellentia per societatem (Latin)
- Motto in English: Excellence through partnership
- Type: Public research university
- Established: 1858 (as a school); 1992 (as a university)
- Affiliations: EFMD; EUA; University Alliance; Universities UK
- Endowment: £0.7 m (2015)
- Chancellor: Bernard Ribeiro, Baron Ribeiro (2021)
- Vice-Chancellor: Roderick Watkins
- Students: 34,370 (2024/25)
- Undergraduates: 25,140 (2024/25)
- Postgraduates: 9,230 (2024/25)
- Location: Cambridge, Chelmsford, Writtle, Peterborough, and London, United Kingdom
- Campus: Urban
- Colours: Blue and yellow
- Website: aru.ac.uk

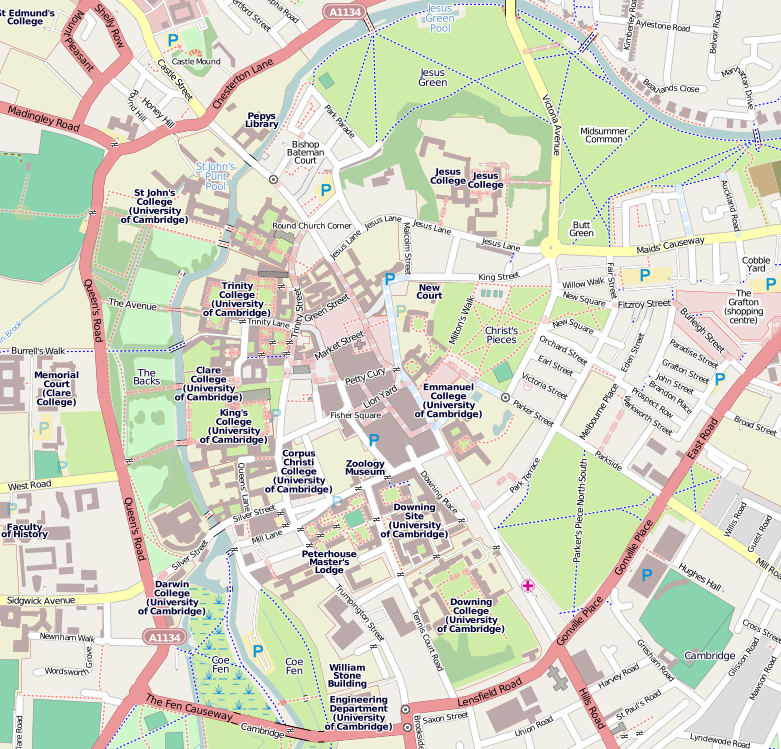
- Location of Cambridge campus

Anglia Ruskin University (ARU) is a public research university in the region of East Anglia, United Kingdom. Its origins date back to the Cambridge School of Art (CSA), founded in 1858 by William John Beamont, a Fellow of Trinity College at the University of Cambridge. The institution became a university in 1992 and was renamed after John Ruskin, the Oxford University professor and author, in 2005. Ruskin delivered the inaugural speech at the Cambridge School of Art in 1858. ARU is classified as one of the "post-1992 universities". The university's motto is in Latin: Excellentia per societatem, which translates to Excellence through partnership in English.

As of 2022, Anglia Ruskin had 35,195 students. ARU has six campuses across the south-eastern portion of the United Kingdom in Cambridgeshire, Essex, and Greater London.

== History ==
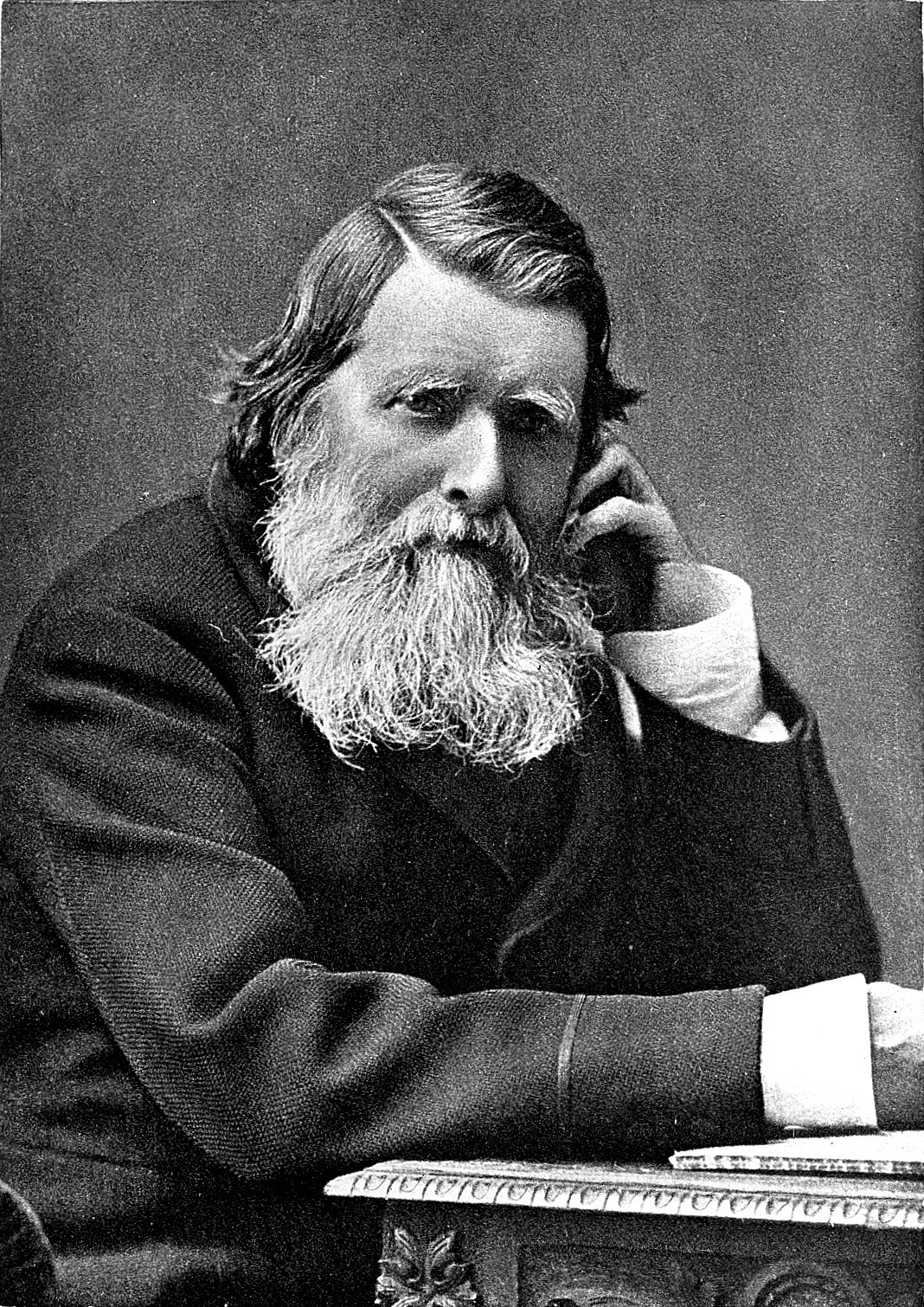
Professor at the University of Oxford, John Ruskin made the inauguration speech at the Cambridge School of Art in 1858. Anglia Ruskin University is built on the foundation of the school of art, which is located at ARU Cambridge.

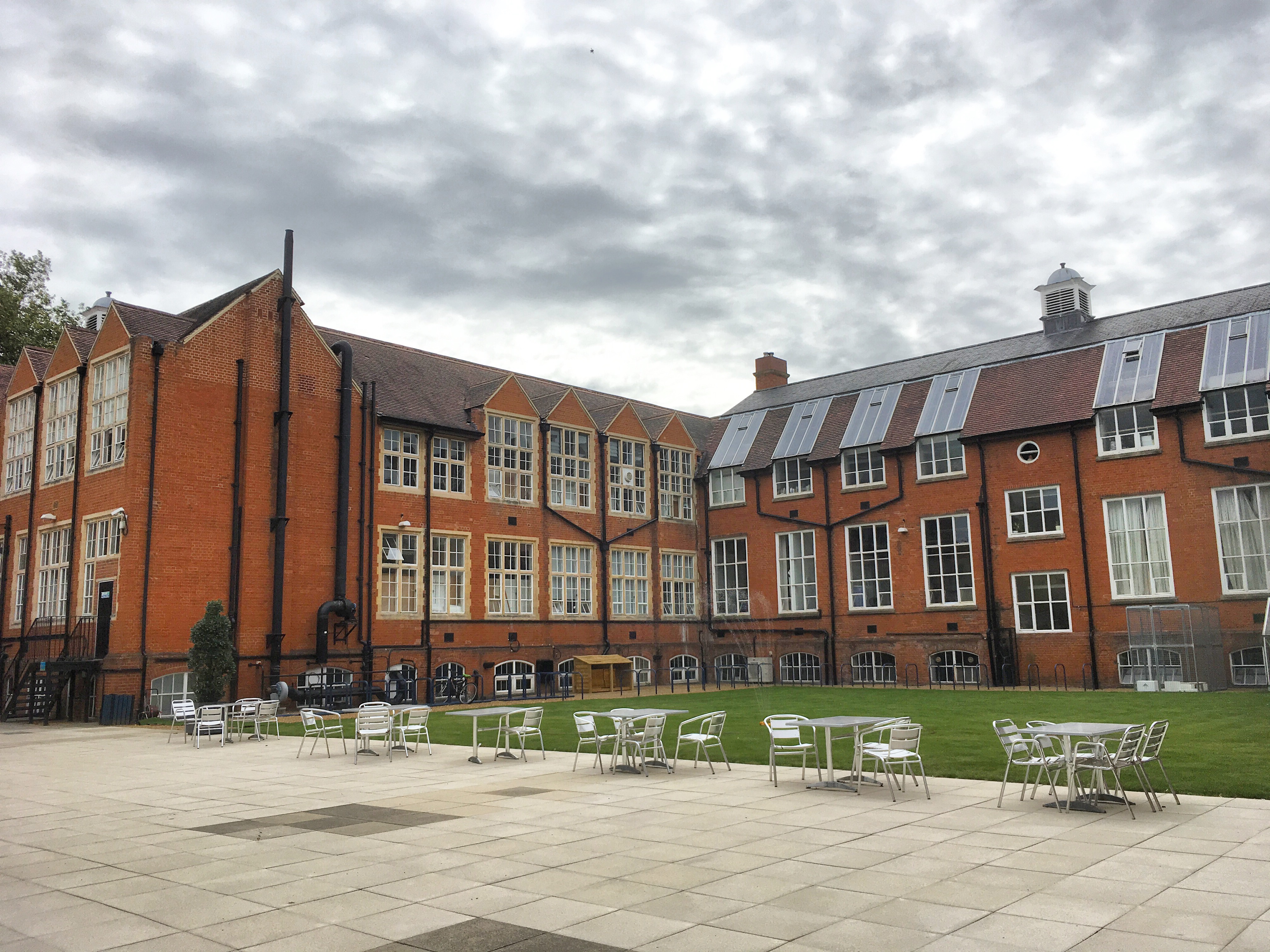
The Cambridge School of Art at ARU Cambridge.

Anglia Ruskin University has its origins in the Cambridge School of Art, founded by William John Beamont in 1858. The inaugural address was given by John Ruskin, who is often incorrectly described as the founder. The original location was near Sidney Sussex College, but it later moved to its current location on East Road, Cambridge.

Drawing was central to its curriculum, reflecting Ruskin's philosophy on art and education.

In the 1920s, the governing body included two remarkable pioneers in the civic history of Cambridge: Clara Rackham and Lilian Mellish Clarke, after whom buildings on the East Road campus were later named.

In 1960, this institution became the Cambridgeshire College of Arts and Technology (CCAT). In 1989, CCAT merged with the Essex Institute of Higher Education, which was originally a vocational school named Chelmsford School of Science and Art and later known as Mid Essex Technical College and Chelmer Institute of Higher Education, to form Anglia Higher Education College.

The merged college became a polytechnic in 1991, adopting the name Anglia Polytechnic, and was awarded university status in 1992. Initially called Anglia Polytechnic University (APU), it retained the term 'polytechnic' in its title because it symbolized the type of education known for equipping students with practical skills for the workforce. However, in 2000 there was some uncertainty about including 'polytechnic' in the title since it was the only university in the country to do so. Wanting to keep the 'APU' abbreviation, a suggestion put forward by the governors was 'Anglia Prior University' (after a former Chancellor Jim Prior), but the Governors decided to keep 'polytechnic' in the title.

The university eventually reconsidered a name change and chose Anglia Ruskin University, incorporating John Ruskin's surname into the title. This change took effect following approval from the Privy Council on 29 September 2005.

In 2007 ARU entered into partnership with London College of Accountancy (LCA; founded in 2000). This resulted in the creation of ARU London.

In October 2023, Anglia Ruskin University became the first university in the United Kingdom to sign UNISON's Anti-Racism Charter.

In 2024, Writtle University College merged with Anglia Ruskin University (ARU), becoming ARU Writtle.

In 2025, ARU became the host institution for the Arc Universities Group, which aims to deliver "innovation, sustainability and inclusive growth across the Oxford-Cambridge corridor".

Former students include the Victorian poet Augusta Webster, who signed John Stuart Mill's petition for women's suffrage in 1866. Past lecturers include Odile Crick, the wife of Francis Crick, who created the iconic image of DNA. The musician Syd Barrett, songwriter and lead guitarist of the band Pink Floyd, is also an alumnus. Author Tom Sharpe served as a lecturer in history at CCAT from 1963 to 1972, and Anne Campbell, the Labour MP for Cambridge from 1992 to 2005, was previously a lecturer in statistics at CCAT.

Lord Michael Ashcroft is an alumnus of ARU and he served as the Chancellor of the university for 20 years. The business school buildings in Cambridge and Chelmsford are named after him.

=== Controversies ===
In a BBC News article from 3 June 2014, it was reported that Anglia Ruskin University received more complaints and appeals from its students than any of the other 120 universities that responded to freedom of information requests. In the 2012/13 academic year, the university received 992 "complaints and appeals".

==== Pok Wong ====
In 2019, Hongkonger Pok Wong, a 2014 graduate of Anglia Ruskin University, received a £61,000 out-of-court settlement from the university after suing for false advertising, alleging a low quality of teaching. The university has maintained that the payout does not indicate fault on its part. In 2018, the London County Court ruled in favor of the university and ordered Wong to pay £13,700 of Anglia Ruskin's legal costs. The university's insurance company offered to settle for £15,000 and to cover Wong's legal costs, which the university later said it did not support.

==== Retracting Junius Ho's honorary award ====
Anglia Ruskin University awarded Junius Ho, a pro-Beijing lawmaker in Hong Kong, the honorary degree of Doctor of Laws in 2011. During the 2019–2020 Hong Kong protests, Ho was accused of supporting those who committed the 2019 Yuen Long attack. In response to Ho's controversial speech, Lord Alton wrote to the university urging it to revoke Ho's degree. The university confirmed that Ho was stripped of his degree on 29 October 2019.

==== Senior nursing lecturer struck off ====
Maurice Slaven, a senior nursing lecturer at ARU Cambridge, was struck off after a two year campaign of bullying, from 2016 to 2018, against a colleague. He mocked the colleague for wearing a turban, which he continually referred to as a "hat" and a "bandage", despite another colleague correcting him. He referred to Sikhs as "you lot", mocked Guru Nanak, the religion's founder, and referred to the kirpan as a "sword". He was struck off after 22 years, despite claiming that the bullying was "banter between friends". He also said that 'Indians came to the UK in a banana boat'. He admitted the charges but did not attend the hearing.

==== Tory donation ====
In 2024, ARU London paid £50,000 to the Conservative Party. The donation was said to have been intended as a personal contribution from the chairman of ARU London Ravi Gill.

==== ARU lecturer struck off for Sexual Offences Act violation ====
On 11 January 2024 at Basildon Magistrates Court, Ben Bathan, nursing lecturer at ARU Chelmsford was convicted of: Recording another person doing a private act with the intention that [he] would, for the purpose of obtaining sexual gratification, look at an image of that other person doing the act, knowing that the other person did not consent to [the] recording ... contrary to section 67(3) and (5) of the Sexual Offences Act 2003.

==== Death of a student ====
On 4 November 2024, an ARU Chelmsford student, Ethan Pieterse, took his own life after a year at the university. He had autism spectrum disorder and during the inquest following his death, his mother said that she "was not allowed to be involved in his education and to know how he was getting on." At university, "he tried to do the best he could and ask the lecturers for help but unfortunately they did not give him the extra support that he needed," Mrs Pieterse said. Following the inquest, the coroner said that he planned to write to the university with "concern" over Ethan's suicide.

==== NMC investigations ====
In 2023, the Nursing and Midwifery Council visited ARU following complaints about their nursing course. In the report following the visit, it was found that ARU could not demonstrate "effective governance systems that ensure compliance with all legal, regulatory, professional and educational requirements". There were also concerns that teaching was not being delivered "by appropriately qualified and experienced professionals" and the NMC couldn't be sure that "educators and assessors always act as professional role models". In June 2026, after yet another complaint about the university, the NMC conducted an extraordinary review assessment to their Cambridge and Chelmsford sites. The report is yet to be released.

== Campuses ==
The university has campuses in Cambridge, Chelmsford, Writtle, Peterborough, and London.

=== Cambridge ===
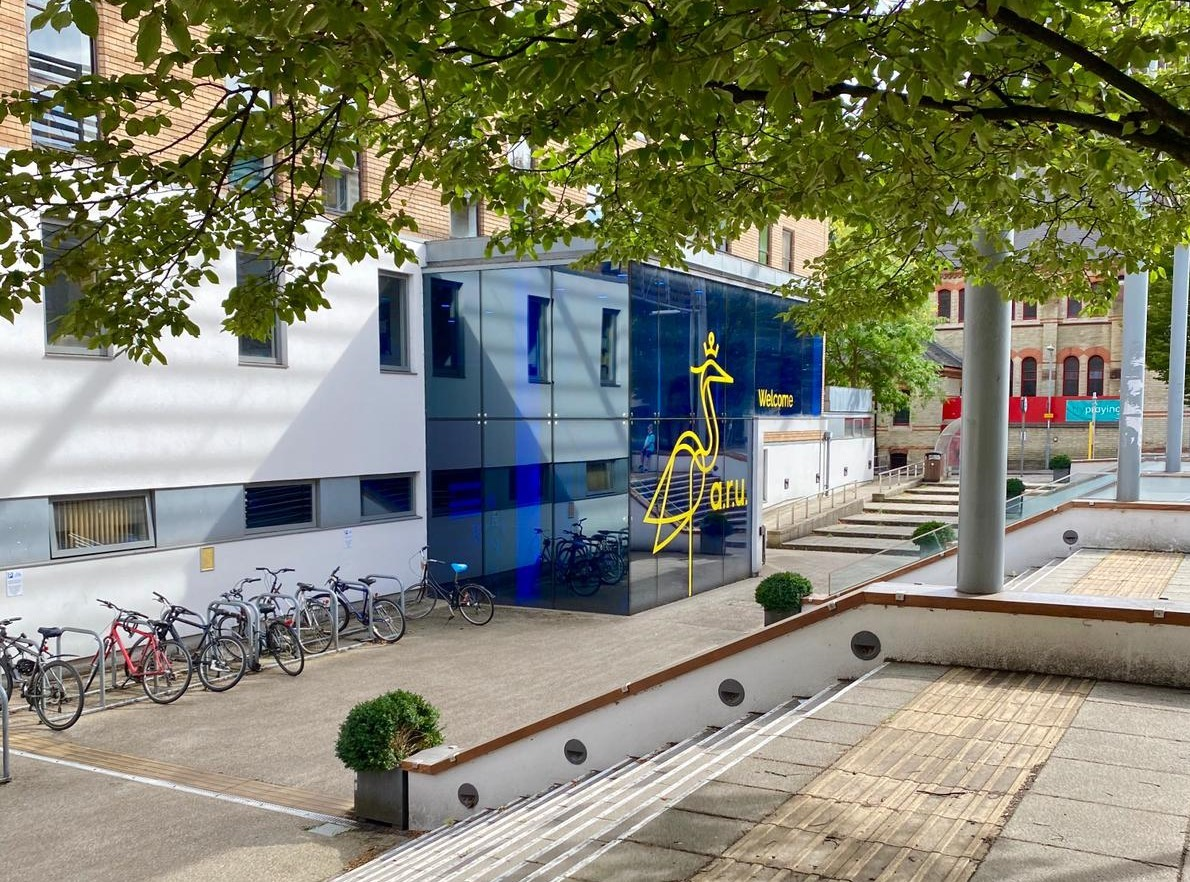
Main entrance to Anglia Ruskin University Cambridge Campus

The Cambridge campus underwent significant redevelopment, beginning with the refurbishment of the main building, Helmore, which was named after Roy Helmore, the principal of the Cambridge College of Arts and Technology from 1977 to 1986. This renovation was completed in 2006. In 2009, one of the university's largest buildings, Rackham, located in the campus center, was demolished to make way for the new Lord Ashcroft International Business School. The new business school was opened in 2011. The campus is also home to the Mumford Theatre.

From 2015, a new building known as Young Street (named for its location between Young Street and New Street) began hosting nursing and health courses, including midwifery, paramedic studies, and operating department practice (ODP). This building is also home to the university's Music Therapy Centre.

As of 2015, all sports, computing, and technology courses were relocated to the newly established Compass House building, which is situated approximately 0.3 miles (0.5 km) along East Road from the main campus.

Anglia Ruskin's Cambridge Campus has its own optometry clinic.

==== Ruskin Gallery ====
The Ruskin Gallery is the university's public art gallery, and admission is free. Exhibits have included both historic and contemporary art, as well as works by students and staff. The gallery is surrounded by studios for fine art, illustration, design, and media. On 9 May 2011, the Ruskin Gallery unveiled its new digital gallery, which displays art in a digital format on high-definition screens, including the world's first Panasonic 103" 3D Full HD plasma screen.

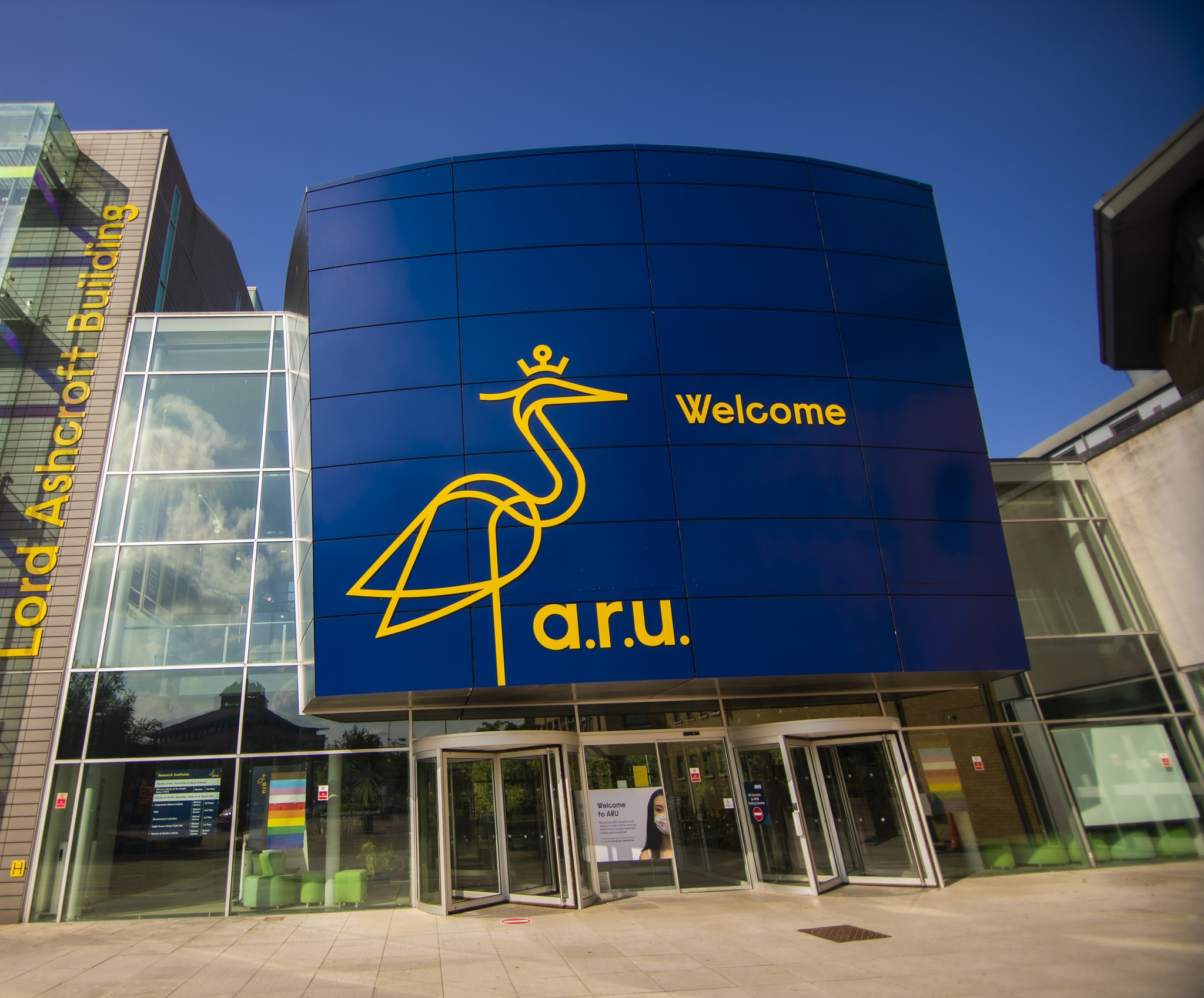
ARU Chelmsford

=== Chelmsford ===
Anglia Ruskin University's Chelmsford campus is situated in the city's University and Innovation Quarter, along the river.

The Chelmsford campus houses several notable buildings, including the Queen's Building (opened in 1995) and the Sawyer's Building (opened in 2001). Queen Elizabeth II inaugurated the Queen's Building.

In 2003, Prince Edward, Earl of Wessex, opened the Michael A. Ashcroft Building, which was later renamed the Lord Ashcroft Building.

The Chelmsford Central campus closed at the end of the 2007/08 academic year, with all facilities moving to the new buildings at the Rivermead campus (now called Chelmsford Campus) on Bishop Hall Lane.

Three buildings were preserved: the East Building (built in 1931), the Frederick Chancellor Building (built in 1902), named after architect Frederic Chancellor, and the Grade II-listed Anne Knight Building, named after social reformer Anne Knight, (constructed in the mid-19th century), which was used by Quakers. The East and Frederick Chancellor buildings are located within a conservation area, meaning they cannot be demolished without planning permission due to their historical significance in the early days of higher education in Essex. The site is currently vacant because the recession halted development that had been planned for many years; however, new plans have been released by Genesis Housing, which currently owns the site.

The Mildmay Sports Centre and the Tindal Building were opened in 2005, followed by the William Harvey Building in 2007. The Faculty Building, opened in 2008, was renamed the Marconi Building in 2011, named after inventor Guglielmo Marconi.

The Postgraduate Medical Institute building, opened in 2011, was later named the Michael Salmon Building in 2017, named after former vice-chancellor, professor Michael Salmon.

Construction of Essex's first School of Medicine began in May 2017, and the facility was officially opened in 2019 by Prince Edward, Duke of Kent.

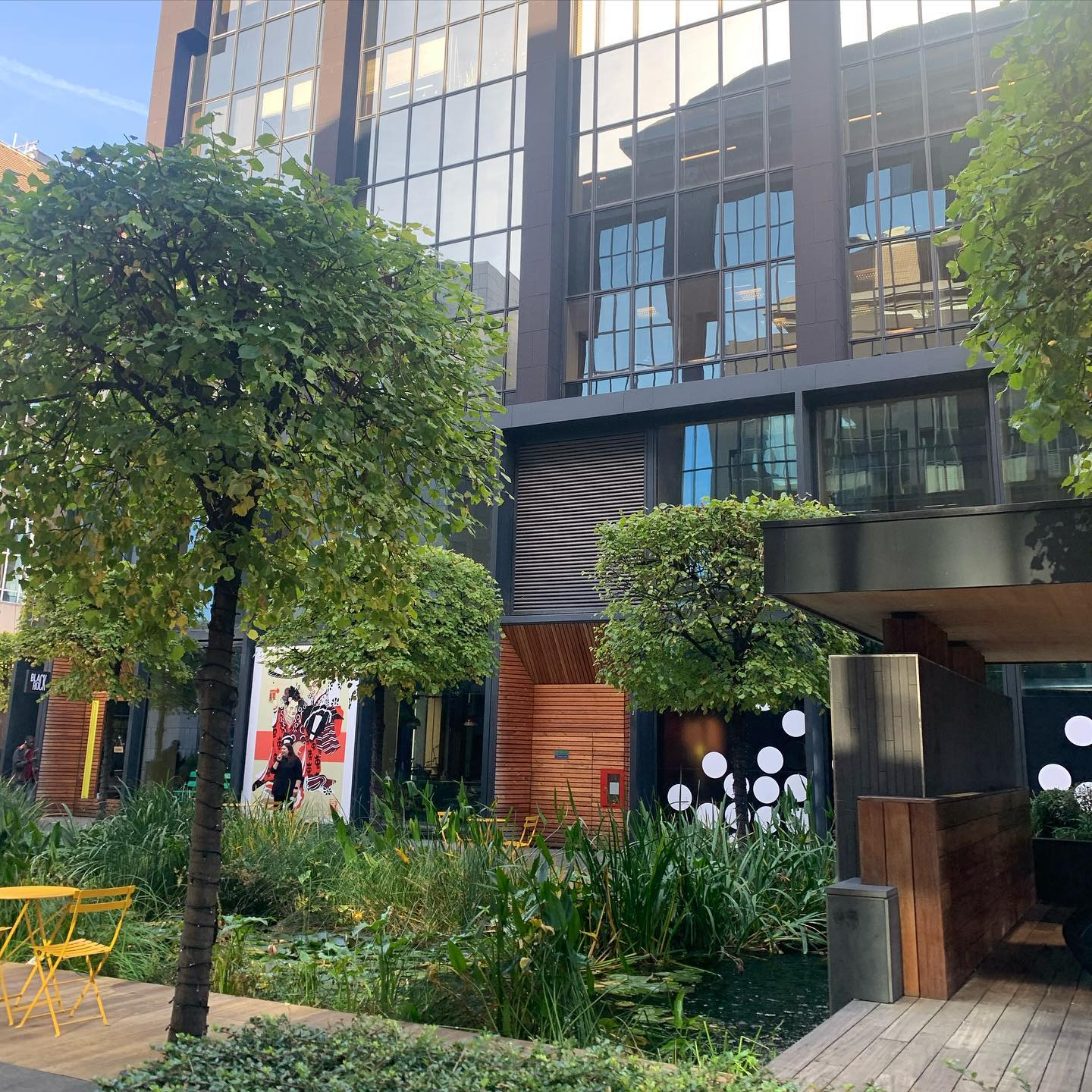
The East India Building of ARU London.

=== London ===
ARU London is located in The East India Building in the former East India Docks, adjacent to Canary Wharf in the London Borough of Tower Hamlets.

=== Peterborough ===
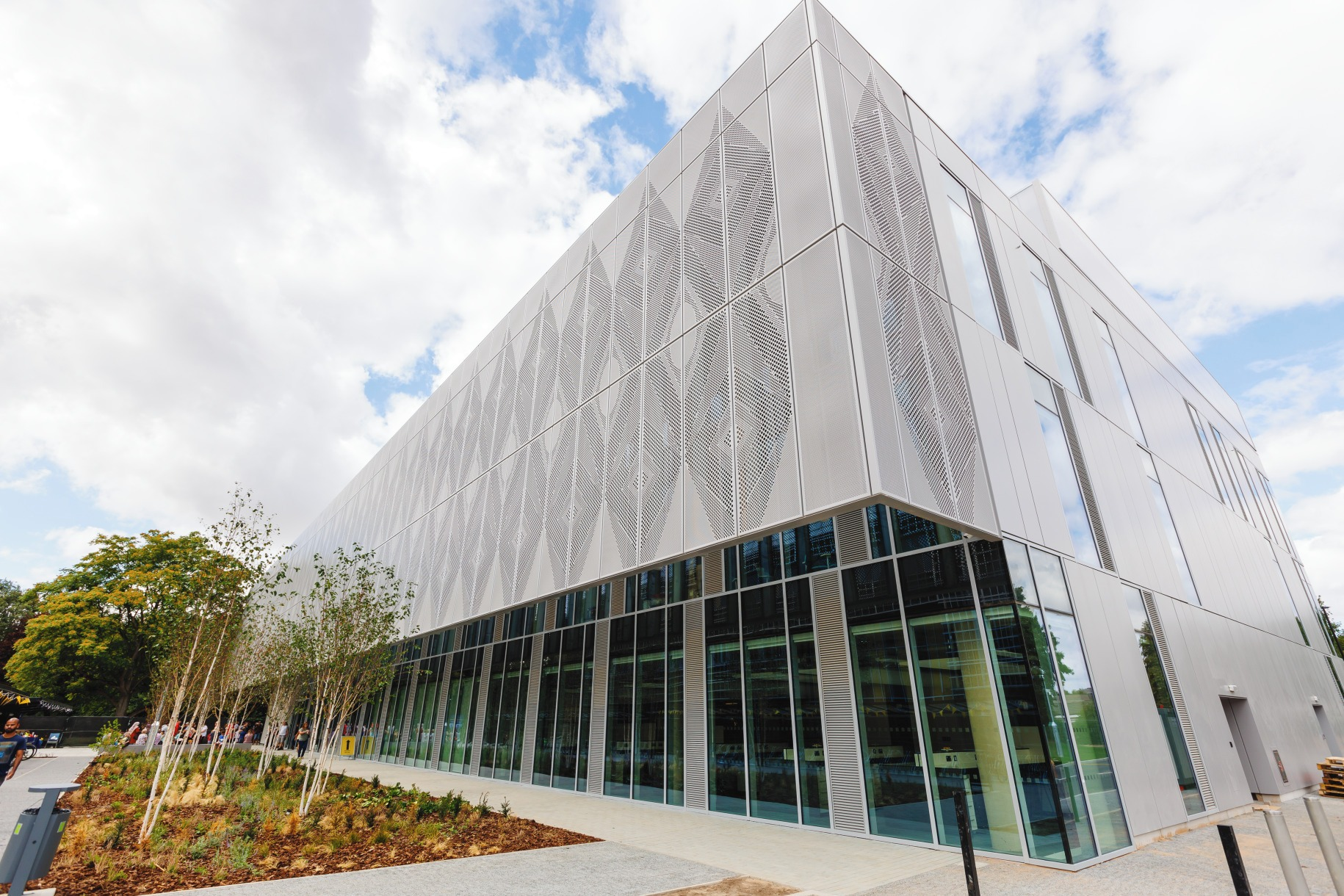
ARU Peterborough

Anglia Ruskin University Peterborough campus, which opened in September 2022, is a purpose-built institution located close to the city center of Peterborough. The campus features a simulated hospital ward, science laboratories, and engineering labs.

On 14 July 2020, the Minister of State for Universities, Michelle Donelan, announced Anglia Ruskin University (ARU) as the official higher education partner for a new employment-focused university in Peterborough. This initiative is a collaboration between the Cambridgeshire and Peterborough Combined Authority (CPCA) and Peterborough City Council (PCC). The campus will also include a materials and manufacturing research and development center operated by 3D printing specialists Photocentric, who have partnered with the CPCA to create the facility on the new Peterborough university campus.

ARU Peterborough opened in 2022, with University House being the first building on the campus. The Peterborough Research & Innovation Centre opened in 2024. In the same year, XRP eXtended Reality Peterborough was inaugurated by writer Sandi Toksvig OBE. The second teaching building, which includes specialized facilities for biomedical sciences and engineering, as well as a Living Lab, was completed in August 2024.

=== Writtle ===
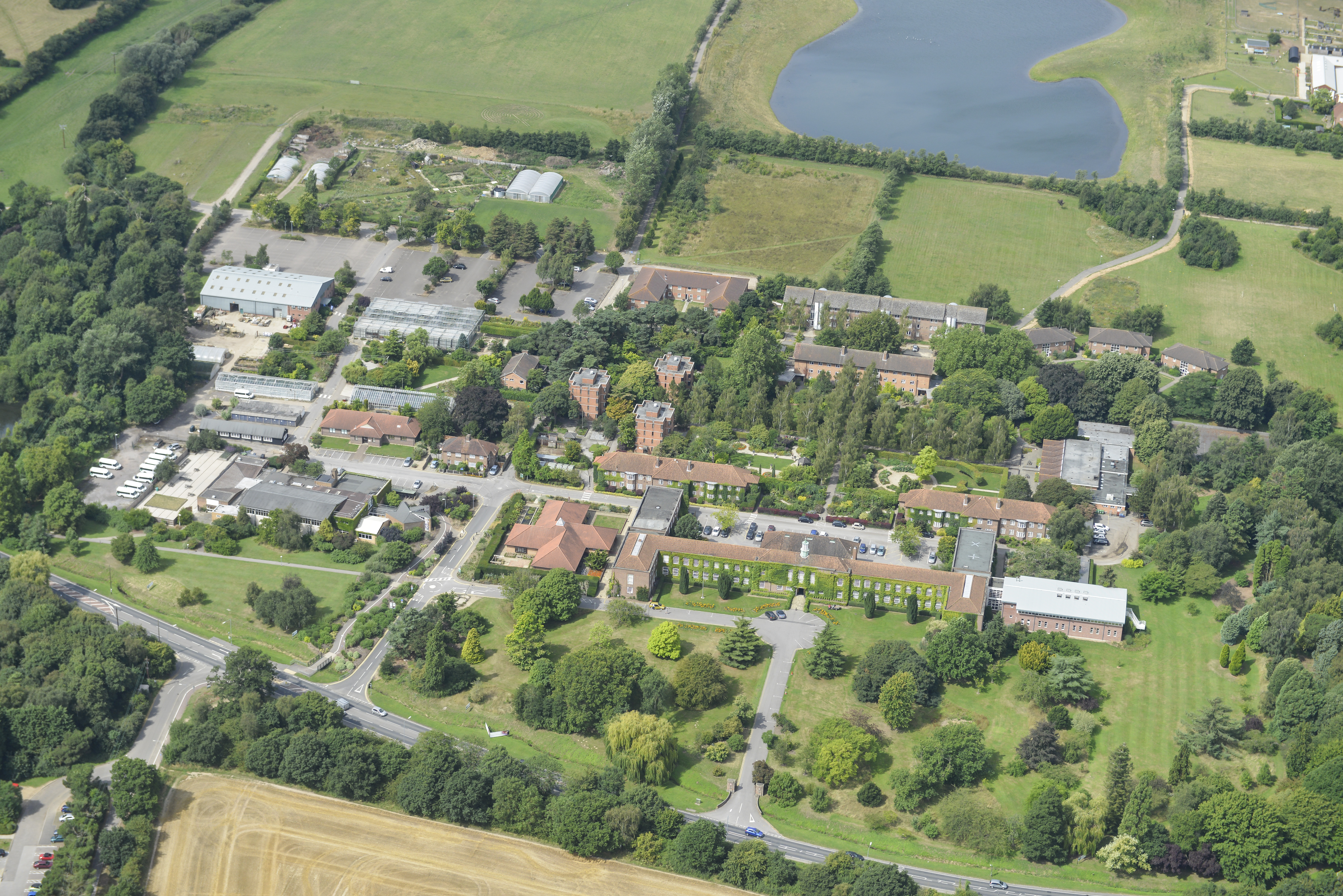
ARU Writtle

Anglia Ruskin University Writtle campus, located in the Essex countryside near Chelmsford, is an educational facility that specialises in land-based, animal sciences, and sport-related programs. The campus spans 150 hectares and features a variety of facilities, including a working farm, equine center, science laboratories, and design studios.

ARU Writtle offers postgraduate, undergraduate, further education, and short courses in agriculture and animal sciences, with a working farm, a specialist small animal unit, and an equine centre on campus. The institution has also developed a range of degree programmes in applied life sciences, sport, and health subjects. Students have been recognized multiple times by the Royal Horticultural Society, including awards at the RHS Chelsea Flower Show in London.

In 2023, Anglia Ruskin University and Writtle University College announced a merger. Writtle University College would become ARU Writtle. The official merger took place on 29 February 2024.

=== Student Housing ===
The Cambridge campus features several accommodations, including Anastasia House, Peter Taylor House, Swinhoe House Hall of Residence, the Railyard, Sedley Court, CB1, and various university houses located throughout the city.

The Chelmsford campus features the Chelmsford Student Village.

At the new Peterborough campus, students utilise private-sector accommodation.

Students at ARU London utilise private-sector accommodation.

== Organisation and administration ==
=== Governance ===
==== Chancellors ====
- James Prior (1992-1999)
- Michael Ashcroft (2001–2020)
- Bernard Ribeiro (2021–2026)
- Sue Black (2026-)

==== Vice chancellors ====
- Michael Salmon (1992-1995)
- Mike Malone-Lee (1995-2004)
- Michael Thorne (2007–2016)
- Iain Martin (2016–2018)
- Roderick Watkins (2019–)

=== Faculties and Schools ===
There are four Faculties at Anglia Ruskin University:

- Faculty of Business and Law
- Faculty of Arts, Humanities, Education & Social Sciences
- Faculty of Health, Medicine & Social Care
- Faculty of Science & Engineering

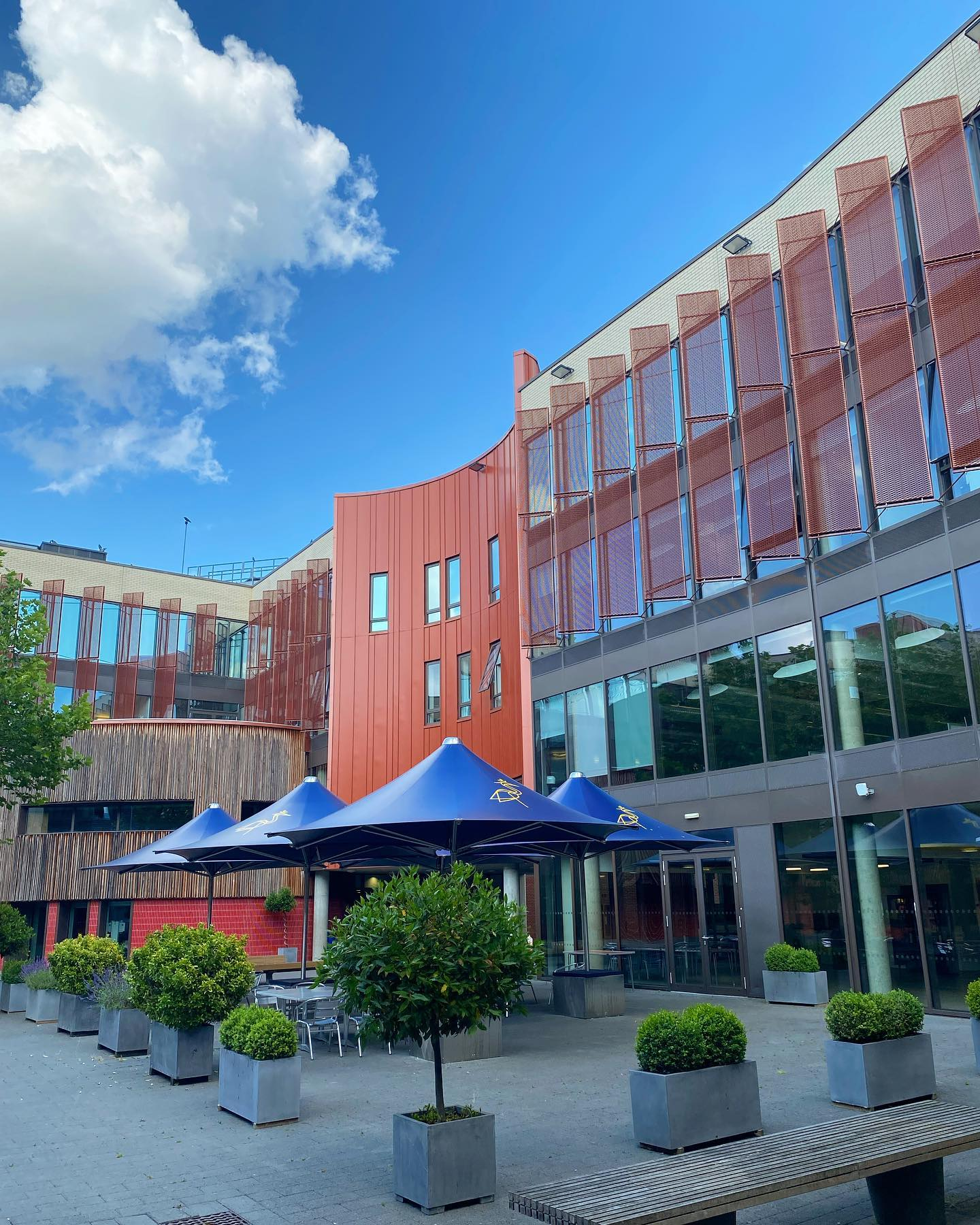
Lord Ashcroft Building in Cambridge.

==== Faculty of Business and Law ====
The Faculty of Business and Law is located in Cambridge, Chelmsford, Peterborough, and London.

The faculty has two schools, the School of Economics, Finance and Law, and the School of Management.

In 2014, Bloomberg Financial Markets Lab was opened for finance, banking, accounting, and economics students at the Chelmsford campus.

During his tenure as Chancellor, Lord Ashcroft made donations totaling £10 million to construct two facilities for the Lord Ashcroft International Business School in Chelmsford and Cambridge. The Lord Ashcroft Building in Chelmsford was inaugurated by Prince Edward, Earl of Wessex, in 2003, while the Lord Ashcroft Building in Cambridge was opened in 2011.

In 2022, the ARU Certificate for Professional Development achieved third place out of over 70 submissions for the Most Innovative Approach to Developing Employability Skills at the Pearson HE Innovate Awards.

In 2022, the Faculty of Business and Law was awarded the Small Business Charter Award.

The business school has an Entrepreneurs in Residence program. In 2023, X-Forces Enterprise joined the program as a strategic partner.

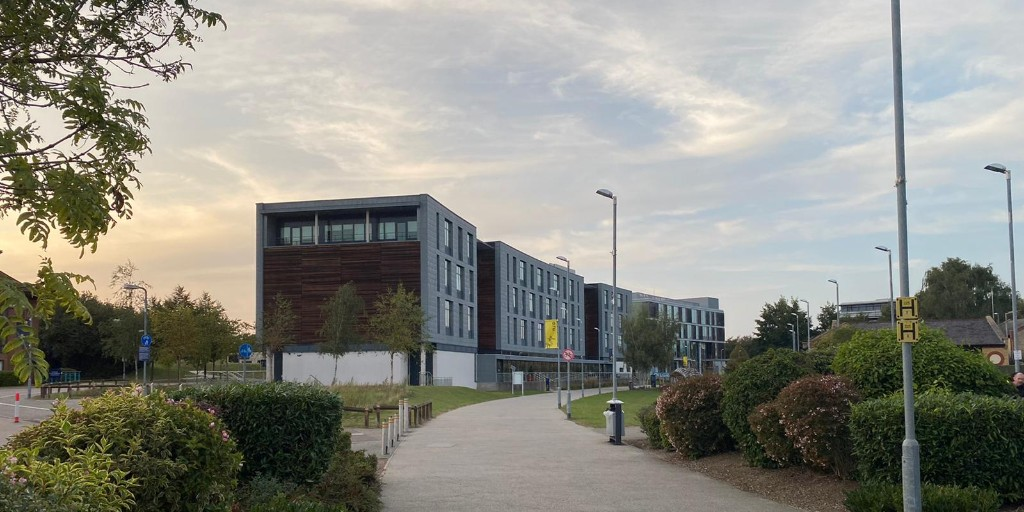
Marconi Building at ARU Chelmsford

==== Faculty of Science & Technology ====
The Faculty of Science and Technology has six departments spread across the Cambridge, Chelmsford, and Writtle campuses.

The Faculty of Science and Engineering consists of six schools: the School of Computing and Information Science, the School of Engineering and the Built Environment, the School of Life Sciences, the School of Psychology, the School of Sport and Sensory Science, and the Writtle School of Agriculture, Animal and Environmental Sciences.

The Department of Built Environment is a multidisciplinary department and is located at the Chelmsford campus.

The Department of Computing and Technology is located at both the Chelmsford and Cambridge campuses. The department maintains close links with the electronics, software, automotive, and creative industries and is a Cisco Systems Regional Networking Academy.

The Department of Life Sciences is located at the Cambridge campus. Teaching equipment includes laboratories, gas and liquid chromatographic systems, and facilities for drug analysis, toxicology, fire investigation, and DNA analysis.

The Department of Psychology is based at the Cambridge campus.

The Department of Vision and Hearing Sciences is based at the Cambridge Campus for Optometry and Ophthalmic Dispensing.

Research in Psychology, Vision, and Environmental Sciences was rated as world-leading or of international quality in the 2008 UK Research Assessment Exercise. Notable successes include the discovery of new animal species, the design of new car bonnets for improved pedestrian safety, and leading studies on the toxic effects of benzylpiperazine (BZP).

In 2023, the Peterborough Innovation and Research Centre launched XRP eXtended Reality Peterborough, an immersive learning environment.

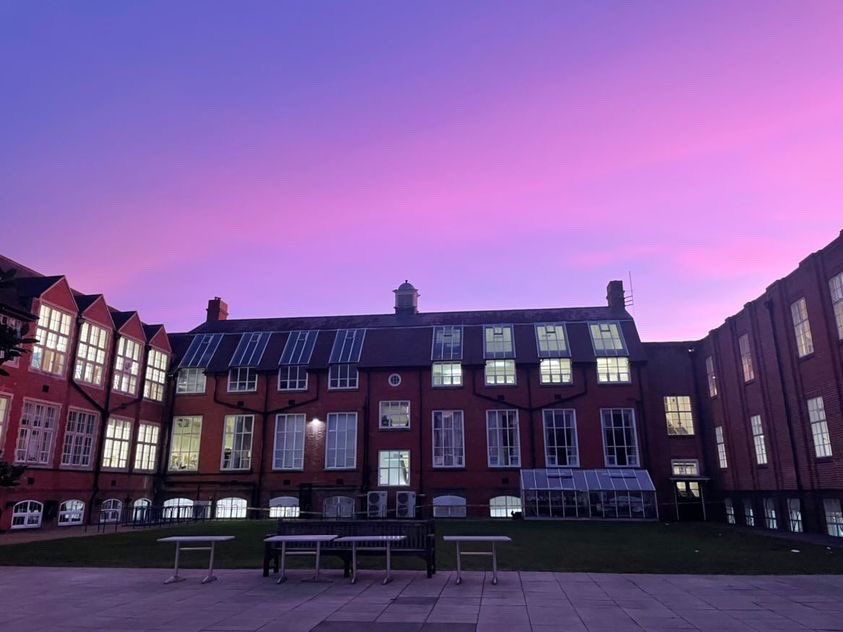
The Cambridge School of Art

==== Faculty of Arts, Humanities, Education & Social Sciences ====
The Faculty of Arts, Humanities, Education, and Social Sciences was formed in 2023, bringing together four schools: the Cambridge School of Art, the Cambridge School of Creative Industries, the School of Education, and the School of Humanities and Social Sciences.

It is also home to three research institutes: the Cambridge Institute for Music Therapy Research (CIMTR), the International Policing and Public Protection Research Institute (IPPPRI), and StoryLab.

In 1953, in collaboration with Francis Crick and James D. Watson at Cambridge University, lecturer Odile Crick drew the original sketch to illustrate the complex concept of DNA's double-helix. Cambridge School of Art was home to students including, caricaturists Roger Law and Peter Fluck, known for their work on TV's Spitting Image, as well as Pink Floyd members Syd Barrett and David Gilmour, who played one of their first gigs in 1966 from the balcony of what is now the illustration studios. Cambridge School of Art is known worldwide for its MA in Children's Book Illustration.

Anglia Ruskin is a member of the Creative East.

In 2023, Anglia Ruskin University and the University of Cambridge formed a partnership to support PhD researchers in the social sciences.

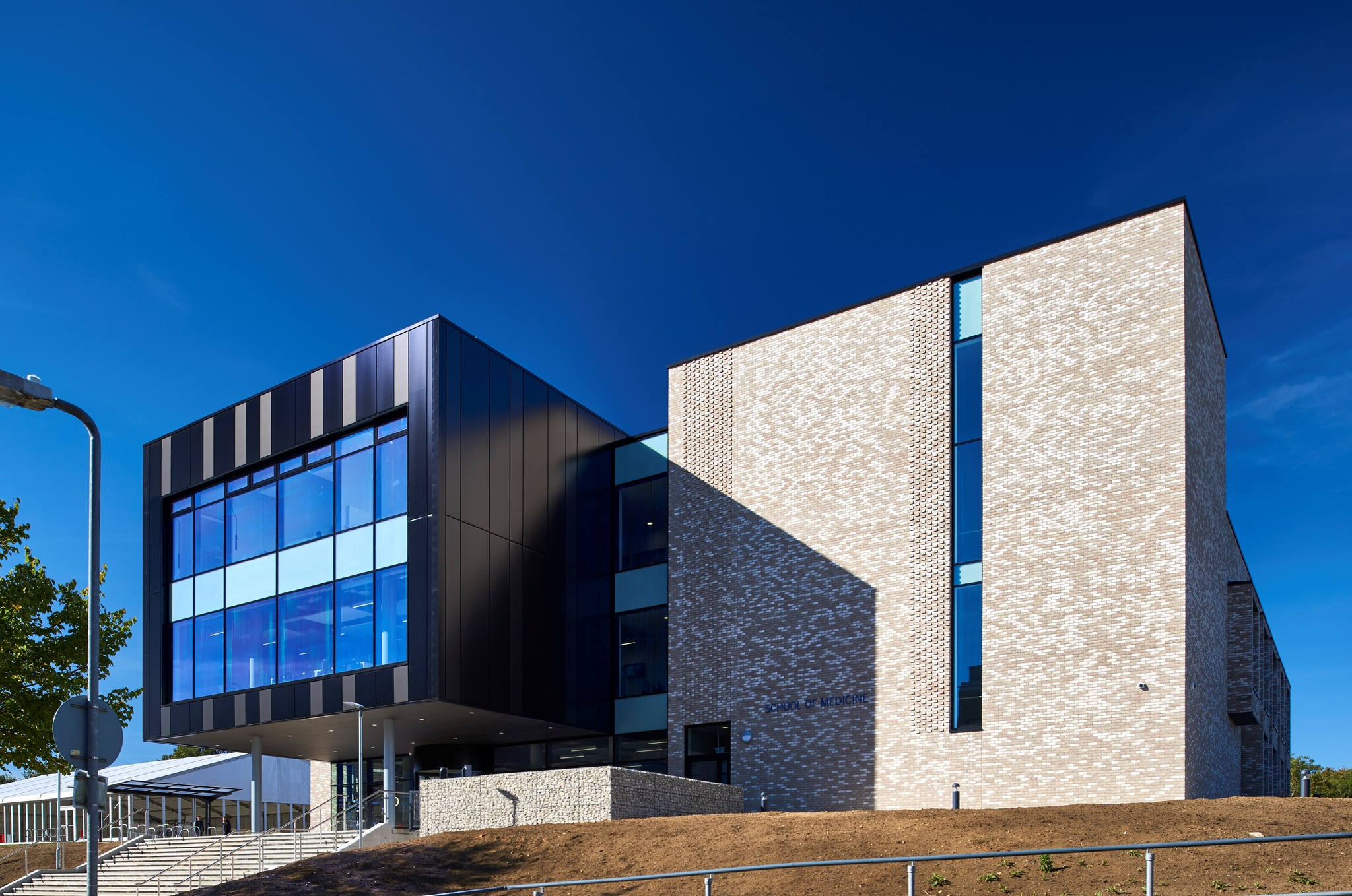
The School of Medicine in Chelmsford

==== Faculty of Health, Medicine & Social Care ====
The Faculty of Health, Medicine, and Social Care comprises four schools: the School of Allied Health and Social Care, the School of Medicine, the School of Midwifery and Community Health, and the School of Nursing.

On 10 October 2016, Anglia Ruskin University announced plans to open Essex's first School of Medicine at its Chelmsford campus. The purpose-built medical school would be the first undergraduate medical school in Essex and would cost £20 million to construct.

On 19 May 2017, Anglia Ruskin University announced that it had begun construction on the purpose-built medical school at its Chelmsford campus, which was scheduled to open in September 2018. Clare Panniker, Chief Executive of Basildon and Thurrock University Hospitals NHS Foundation Trust, Mid Essex Hospital Services NHS Trust, and Southend University Hospital NHS Foundation Trust, attended the event alongside other officials.

On 21 September 2017, the university announced that the General Medical Council had approved its curriculum and that it now had official School of Medicine status. In 2019, the school was formally opened by Prince Edward, Duke of Kent.

In 2022, ARU founded the first university hub in the UK for Samaritans, a charity for emotional support.

In 2023, Anglia Ruskin University was rated tenth among the top ten British universities for social work by The Guardian newspaper.

=== Research Institutes ===
Anglia Ruskin has six research institutes.

- Cambridge Institute for Music Therapy Research
- Global Sustainability Institute
- Policing Institute for the Eastern Region
- StoryLab Research Institute
- Veterans and Families Research Institute
- Vision and Eye Research Institute (formerly Vision and Eye Research Unit, VERU)

=== Partnerships ===
National partners are School of Osteopathy in London, Cambridge Regional College, Cambridge Theological Federation, College of West Anglia, Renew Counselling in Chelmsford, and University Centre Peterborough.

Distance learning partners are CNET Training and Cambridge Spark.

International partners are Imperium International College, First City University College, and MAHSA University in Kuala Lumpur in Malaysia and The School of Accounting and Management, located at the University-Town of St Augustine - Trinidad and Tobago.

Anglia Ruskin University's past and present working life partners are NHS, British Armed Forces, Cambridge University Press, Essex County Council, UPS, Barclays, Capita, Russian Railways, Willmott Dixon, Morgan Sindall Infrastructure, Softwerx, Triangular Alliance, Greenwoods Legal, Virgin Money, Timberland, Volvo, and Harrods.

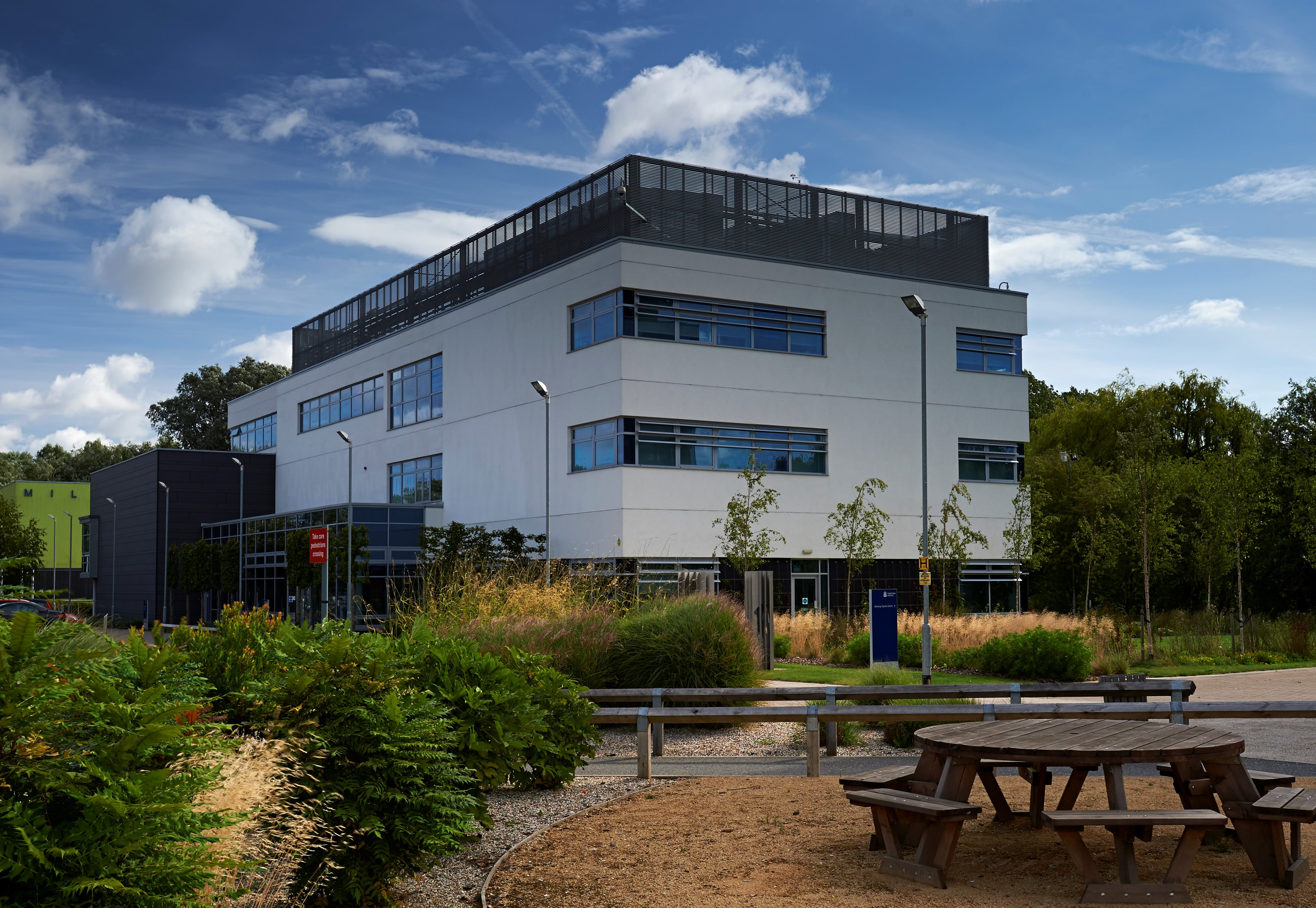
Arise Innovation Hub in Chelmsford

=== Arise Innovation Hubs ===
Anglia Ruskin University founded the Arise Innovation Hubs, which are located in Chelmsford and Harlow. These Essex-based innovation hubs promote entrepreneurship and innovation by supporting startups and scaleups.

=== Anglia Ruskin Enterprise Academy (AREA) ===
Anglia Ruskin Enterprise Academy (AREA) supports entrepreneurship among university students and alumni. AREA organises the annual #ThinkBigARU business plan competition for students and alumni. The Entrepreneurs' Community connects students with alumni and external entrepreneurs. ARU is accredited by the Institute of Enterprise and Entrepreneurs (IOEE) and the National Centre for Entrepreneurship in Education (NCEE).

== Academic profile ==
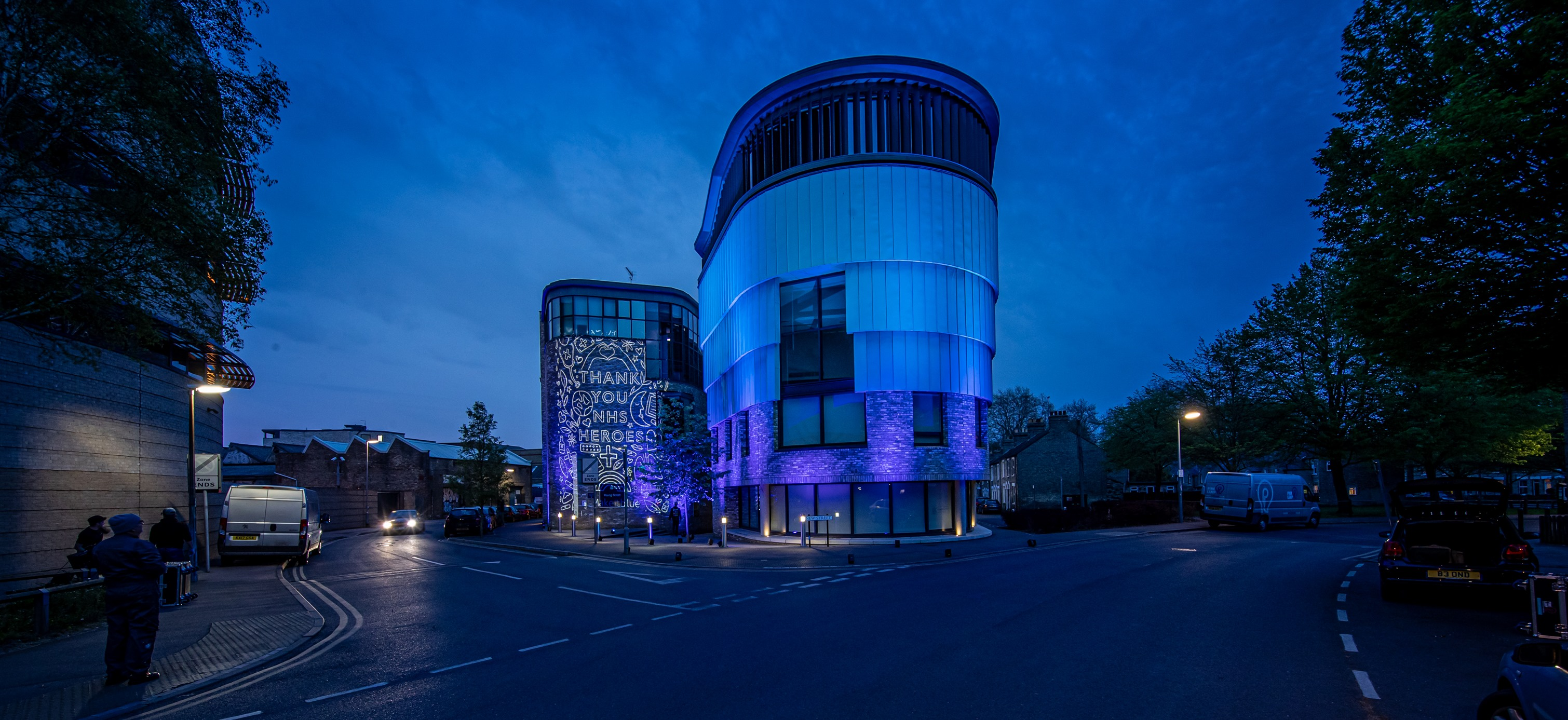
Young Street of ARU Cambridge. A tribute to NHS heroes during the COVID-19 pandemic.

=== Research ===
The twelve subject areas within Anglia Ruskin University classified by the Research Excellence Framework (REF) 2014 as producing "world-leading" research are:

- Allied Health Professions, Dentistry, Nursing, and Pharmacy
- Architecture, Built Environment, and Planning
- Art and Design
- History, Practice, and Theory
- Business and Management Studies
- Communication, Cultural and Media Studies, Library and Information Management
- English Language and Literature
- Geography, Environmental Studies, and Archaeology
- History
- Law
- Music, Drama, Dance, and Performing Arts
- Psychology, Psychiatry, and Neuroscience
- Social Work and Social Policy

=== Rankings ===
Rankings
National rankings
- Complete (2027): 113
- Guardian (2027): 102
- Times / Sunday Times (2027): 123

Global rankings
- QS (2027): 1001–1200
- THE (2026): 601–800

- Anglia Ruskin University (ARU) is ranked within the top 350 universities in the world and ranked joint 38th in the UK by the Times Higher Education World University Rankings 2020.
- In 2021, Anglia Ruskin University (ARU) was in the top 10% of English higher education institutions (HEIs) for skills, enterprise and entrepreneurship and in the top 20% for local growth and regeneration, according to a report by Research England.
- In 2023, the Higher Education Statistics Agency (HESA) revelead that ARU was in top 15% in the country for graduates in employment and/or further study. ARU was ranked 3rd in the country for graduates who are employed as managers, directors or senior officials.
- In 2023, Times Higher Education ranked ARU London as 3rd for overall positivity among higher education institutions in the UK.
- In 2024, Anglia Ruskin University was ranked among the top 6.8% of universities worldwide.
- ARU was first in the East of England, and seventh in the UK, for student start-ups, with 123 ventures formed in the 2023/24 academic year.
- According to the Graduate Outcomes survey conducted by the Higher Education Statistics Agency in 2025, Anglia Ruskin University (ARU) ranked first in the East of England for the proportion of UK undergraduates working as managers, directors, or senior officials 15 months after graduation. In addition, ARU shared the top position in the region for the overall proportion of UK undergraduates in employment.
- In 2025, ARU was ranked 54th out of 107 universities in the UK by the Times Higher Education UK University Rankings.

=== Awards ===
- Anglia Ruskin University was awarded a First in the Green League 2012 by People & Planet. The league is based on ten environmental criteria, both policy and performance related. It incorporates data obtained through the Freedom of Information Act, including the percentage of waste recycled and CO_{2} emissions for each individual institution.
- Anglia Ruskin University has been named as one of the most upwardly mobile universities in the world.
- Anglia Ruskin was awarded Entrepreneurial University of the Year in the 2014 Times Higher Education Awards.
- The university won the Duke of York Award for University Entrepreneurship at the Lloyds Bank National Business Awards 2016.
- In 2021, Anglia Ruskin was awarded The Queen's Anniversary Prize for music therapy research.
- In 2022, the Times Higher Education placed ARU as 1st in the UK for Good Health and Wellbeing.
- In May 2023, ARU was recognised for advancing race equality with a Bronze Race Equality Charter award. ARU was one of 38 UK universities who have achieved Bronze status, while only one has achieved Silver.
- In 2023, ARU Peterborough won the University Impact Initiative of the Year from the Association of University Directors of Estates.
- In 2023, ARU Peterborough won the Alliance Award for successful collaborations.
- In 2023, ARU Peterborough was shortlisted for the AJ Architecture Awards.
- In 2023, Anglia Ruskin University won the University of the Year title at the Social Mobility Awards (SOMO) which is a fundraising initiative for a charity. The Social Mobility Awards have been organized since 2017 and supported by the Prime Minister of the UK.
- In 2023, ARU received Gold Award from The Teaching Excellence Framework. (TEF).
- In December 2023, ARU won the national Green Gown Award for sustainability.
- In 2023, Anglia Ruskin won the University of the Year top prize at the Times Higher Education (THE) 2023 awards.
- In 2024, ARU was awarded the Athena SWAN Silver Award from Advance HE for gender equality progress.
- In 2024, ARU Law Clinic was nominated for the Alliance Award.
- In 2024, ARU became the first university in the United Kingdom to win the National Centre for Entrepreneurship in Education (NCEE) Entrepreurial University Award.
- In 2024, ARU received the Gold Award in the Defence Employer Recognition Scheme from the Ministry of Defence.
- In 2025, ARU Peterborough was nominated in the Best Building category at the Pineapples Awards 2025.
- In 2025, Law Clinic at the Faculty of Business and Law was a finalist for the University Commercial Impact Award at the LexisNexis Legal Awards.
- In 2025, ARU was a finalist for three awards: Co-created Employability Initiatives, Employer and Community Partnerships, and Enterprise and Entrepreneurship at the Academic Employability Awards.
- ARU Peterborough's Lab building won the Best Building Award at the Pineapple Awards in 2025.
- In 2025, Anglia Ruskin Enterprise Academy (AREA) was shortlisted for the Entrepreneurship Catalyst Award at the National Enterprise Educator Awards (NEEA) 2025.
- In 2025, ARU Peterborough's The Lab is shortlisted for the Project of the Year at the national Education Estates Awards.

== Notable people ==
=== Alumni ===
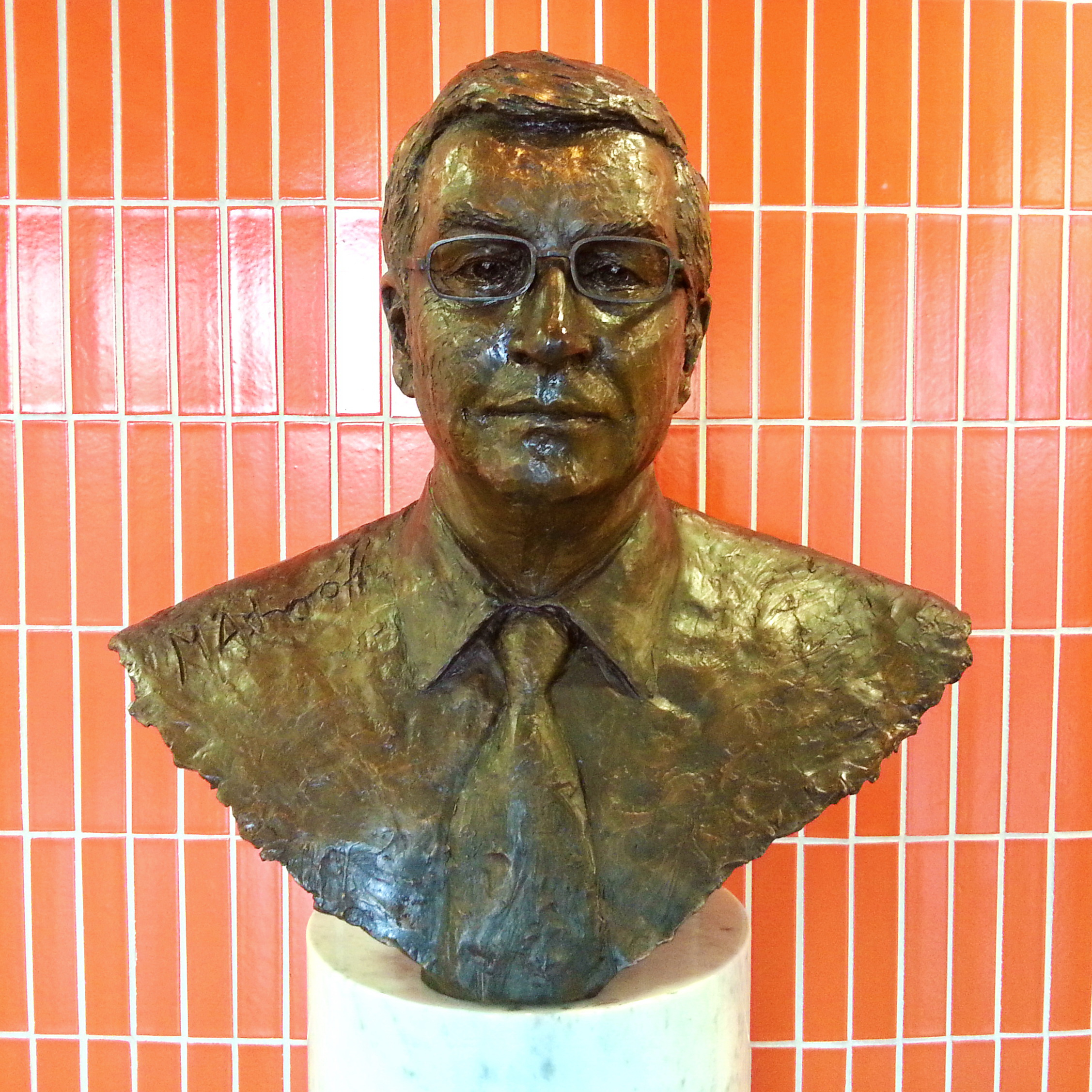
The bust of Lord Ashcroft at the university's Cambridge campus, an alumnus of the university; the business school is named after him.

- Michael Ashcroft, English investor, billionaire and former Conservative vice chairman
- Eddie Ballard, former English cricketer for Cambridge UCCE and Hertfordshire
- Syd Barrett and David Gilmour, Pink Floyd members
- Chris Beckett, academic, author and science-fiction novelist
- Manish Bhasin, sports journalist and BBC presenter
- Henry Brock, specialist linguist at University of Cambridge and illustrator
- Pips Bunce, banking executive and LGBTQ activist
- John Burnside, academic and T. S. Eliot Prize winning author
- Elsie Vera Cole, artist
- Leon Cole, actor and filmmaker
- Nick Crane, English geographer and TV presenter
- Sarah-Jane Crawford, TV presenter, radio presenter, and model
- Hugh Crossley, 4th Baron Somerleyton, restaurateur, hotel owner, landowner, conservationist
- Grahame Davies, poet, novelist, and lyricist
- Geraldine Finlayson, researcher and director of John Mackintosh Hall
- Peter Fluck and Roger Law, creators of Spitting Image
- Angela Hartnett, entrepreneur and chef
- Kim Howells, Labour politician and former Chair of the Intelligence and Security Committee
- Paul Hopfensperger (politician, GB open water swimmer, best-selling author and musician with The Teazers)
- Leila Khan, actress
- Lon Kirkop, Maltese visual artist, award winning published author, songwriter and theatre practitioner
- Hussain Mohamed Latheef, Vice President of Maldives
- Patrick Le Quément, automobile engineer and former chief designer at Renault
- Emilia Monjowa Lifaka, Chairperson of the Commonwealth Parliamentary Association
- Ricardo P. Lloyd, British actor
- Devant Maharaj, former Senator and Minister of Food Production, Trinidad and Tobago
- Ian Miller, English footballer
- Magdalene Odundo, a ceramic artist graduate and 2022 Honorary Doctorate of Arts.
- Tony Palladino, English cricketer
- Sarah Perry, author
- Ama Pomaa Boateng
- Anders Holch Povlsen, owner and CEO of Bestseller
- Shoo Rayner, author and illustrator
- Philip Reeve, author and illustrator of children's books
- Nicky Richards, CEO and Chief Investment Officer MLC Asset Management
- Andrew Sayer, English economist, professor of Social Theory and Political Economy at Lancaster University
- Patricia Scotland, Baroness Scotland of Asthal, Labour politician, Commonwealth Secretary-General, government policy-maker, former minister, attorney general and president of Chatham House
- Pengiran Shamhary, Minister of Transport and Infocommunications of Brunei
- Ronald Searle, creator of St Trinian's
- Michal Shalev, author and illustrator of children's books
- Rio Haryanto, Indonesian former F1 driver
- Tim Stokely, founder and CEO of OnlyFans
- Barbara Yung, Hong Kong actress
- Mark Wood, businessman, accountant and chairman of NSPCC

=== Notable academics ===
- Andrew Bowie, philosophy
- Stephen Bustin, medicine
- Peter Carter, nursing
- Malcolm Gaskill, history
- Jon Hare, game design
- Dave Hill, education
- Ray Iles, biomedics
- John Lawrence, illustration
- Patricia MacCormack, philosophy
- Una McCormack, creative writing
- Farah Mendlesohn, literature
- Anna Nekaris, conservation and environment
- Helen Odell-Miller, music therapy
- Shahina Pardhan, Optometry and Preventing Blindness
- Guido Rings, postcolonial studies
- Ash Sarkar, global politics
- Tom Sharpe, history
- Justin Stebbing, biomedics
- Claudia Wascher, behavioural biology

=== Honorary doctors ===
- Jason Arday (academic and storyteller)
- Michael Ashcroft
- Anne Campbell
- Jilly Cooper
- Richard Dannatt
- Robert Dixon-Smith
- Mark Foster
- Stephen Fry
- Anthony Giddens
- Ravi Gill
- David Gilmour
- Germaine Greer
- Dido Harding
- Hermann Hauser
- Anya Hindmarch
- Wilko Johnson
- Griff Rhys Jones
- Richard Madeley
- Kylie Minogue
- Katie Piper
- Anders Holch Povlsen
- David Prior
- Jim Prior
- Suzi Quatro
- Bernard Ribeiro
- Andrew Sentance
- Barbara Young

== See also ==
- Armorial of UK universities
- Cambridge Theological Federation
- List of universities in the United Kingdom
