= Shahina Pardhan =

Shahina Pardhan OBE
- Education: University of Bradford
- Scientific career
- Workplaces: University of Bradford; Anglia Ruskin University

Shahina Pardhan is the Director of the Vision and Eye Research Unit and the Anglia Ruskin University School of Medicine. She was the first woman to be appointed Professor of Optometry in the United Kingdom.

== Early life and education ==
Pardhan was born in Tanzania and moved to Yorkshire when she was 18 years old. Pardhan graduated from the University of Bradford in 1984. She was awarded the Yorkshire Optical Society's Best Student Prize. She received a scholarship from the College of Optometrists and began her graduate studies, earning a doctorate in 1989.

== Career and research ==
Pardhan joined the University of Bradford, where she was the only woman lecturer. On her first day she was told that she "couldn’t go into the staff common room because secretaries weren’t allowed". In 1993 she was the first woman to be appointed Professor of Optometry and first Asian woman to become Professor of any discipline in the UK. Pardhan joined Anglia Ruskin University as a Professor in 2001. She won the Asian Woman of Achievement Award in 2001, an award presented by Cherie Blair. In 2005 she was awarded the Asian Jewel Award. In 2009 Pardhan was appointed Director of the Vision and Eye Research Institute. Her research focuses on low vision and the difficulties that people suffering with low vision face, including mobility and recreational activities.

She was an invited speaker at the Aspian Pacific Optometry Congree in Kuala Lumpur in 2015. She was the keynote speaker at the 2017 launch of Women in Vision, a networking group for women working on vision in the UK. She led a joint conference with Southern University of Science and Technology to discuss audio and visual impairment.

== Awards and honours ==
- In 2015, Pardhan was awarded the Vice Chancellor's award for strategic leadership.
