= PensionBee =

British online personal pension scheme provider

PensionBee is an online personal pension scheme provider operating in the UK and the US. It was co-founded in 2014 by its chief executive officer, Romi Savova, and chief technology officer, Jonathan Lister Parsons.

It is authorised and regulated by the Financial Conduct Authority in the UK. It is authorised and regulated by the Securities and Exchange Commission in the US.

== History ==
UK Operations

In 2021, PensionBee joined the High Growth segment of the main market of the London Stock Exchange. In April 2022, it transitioned to the Premium segment, and from 20 March 2023 PensionBee has been a constituent of the FTSE All-Share and FTSE SmallCap indices. From December 2023, PensionBee has also been included as a constituent of the FTSE4Good Index.

US Operations

PensionBee launched its US operations in July 2024, partnering with State Street. The platform aims to simplify retirement savings for American consumers by allowing them to consolidate and roll over their 401(k) plans into new Individual Retirement Accounts (IRAs). To support this expansion, PensionBee raised approximately $25 million (£20 million) in October 2024.

In the first half of 2025, the company added 21,000 new "invested customers", for a total of 286,000. Assets under administration grew in the same period to over $8bn globally. In August 2024, the company announced a partnership with investment management firm State Street, for expansion into the US market.

== Leadership ==
- Non-Executive Chair: Mark Wood
- Senior Independent Director: Mary Francis
- Chief Executive Officer: Romi Savova
- Chief Technology Officer: Jonathan Lister Parsons
- Chief Financial Officer: Christoph J.Martin
