= Michal Shalev =

Israeli author and illustrator

- מיכל שלו
- Education: Cambridge School of Art (MA)
- Occupations: Author; illustrator
- Writing career
- Genre: Children's literature

Michal Shalev (Hebrew: מיכל שלו) is an Israeli author and illustrator of children's books. She has an MA in children's book illustration from the Cambridge School of Art. She is also a graduate of WIZO Haifa Academy of Design and Education.

== Select English bibliography ==
- 2016: How to be Famous, 32pp., ISBN 978-1-776570-29-4
