= Odile Crick =

British artist

Odile Crick (11 August 1920 – 5 July 2007) was a British artist best known for her drawing of the double helix structure of DNA discovered by her husband Francis Crick, James D. Watson, and Rosalind Franklin in 1953.

== Early life ==
Odile Crick was born as Odile Speed in King's Lynn, Norfolk, England, to a French mother, Marie-Therese Josephine Jaeger and an English father, Alfred Valentine Speed, who was a jeweller. She was an art student in Vienna when the Nazis occupied Austria in 1938. Returning to England, Speed joined the Women's Royal Naval Service (WRNS) as a lorry driver. However, her skills in German led to work as a code-breaker and translator at the Admiralty where she met Francis Crick in 1945. After the war, she finished her art studies at St. Martin's in London.

== Life with Crick in Britain ==
Odile Speed married Francis Crick in 1949 and lived in Cambridge. Odile Crick worked as a teacher at what is now Anglia Ruskin University before the births of her daughters Gabrielle and Jacqueline.

Francis Crick and James Watson asked her to draw an illustration of the double helix for their paper on DNA for Nature in 1953. The sketch was reproduced widely in textbooks and scientific articles and has become the symbol for molecular biology. Terrence J. Sejnowski of the Salk Institute for Biological Studies said, "It may be the most famous [scientific] drawing of the 20th century, in that it defines modern biology."

However, she was not aware at first of the importance of the discovery. In his memoir What Mad Pursuit, Crick said that she had told him later "You were always coming home and saying things like that, so naturally I thought nothing of it."

Several exhibitions have been held of Crick's paintings of curvaceous nudes. Her models included their au pairs for the children and her husband's secretaries.

The Cricks became famous for their parties in the 1960s either in Cambridge or at a cottage near Haverhill. At one party, a nude model posed on a couch to encourage their guests to become amateur painters.

== Life in California ==
When Francis Crick became a professor at the Salk Institute in the 1970s, the Cricks moved to California.

Odile Crick outlived her husband and died from cancer in La Jolla, California, aged 86. The Odile Crick Memorial Exhibition of her art was held at the Salk Institute, La Jolla, on 12 October 2007.

She was survived by a brother Philippe, her two daughters Gabrielle and Jacqueline (1954–2011), two grandchildren, and her stepson, Michael.

== Resources ==
- Robert Olby; Oxford National Dictionary article: 'Crick, Francis Harry Compton (1916–2004)', Oxford Dictionary of National Biography, Oxford University Press, January 2008;
- Robert Olby; "Crick: A Biography", Cold Spring Harbor Laboratory Press, ISBN 978-0-87969-798-3, to be published in August 2009.
- Matt Ridley; Francis Crick: Discoverer of the Genetic Code (Eminent Lives) first published in June 2006 in the US and in the UK September 2006, by HarperCollins Publishers; 192 pp, ISBN 0-06-082333-X.
