= Roderick Watkins =

English composer

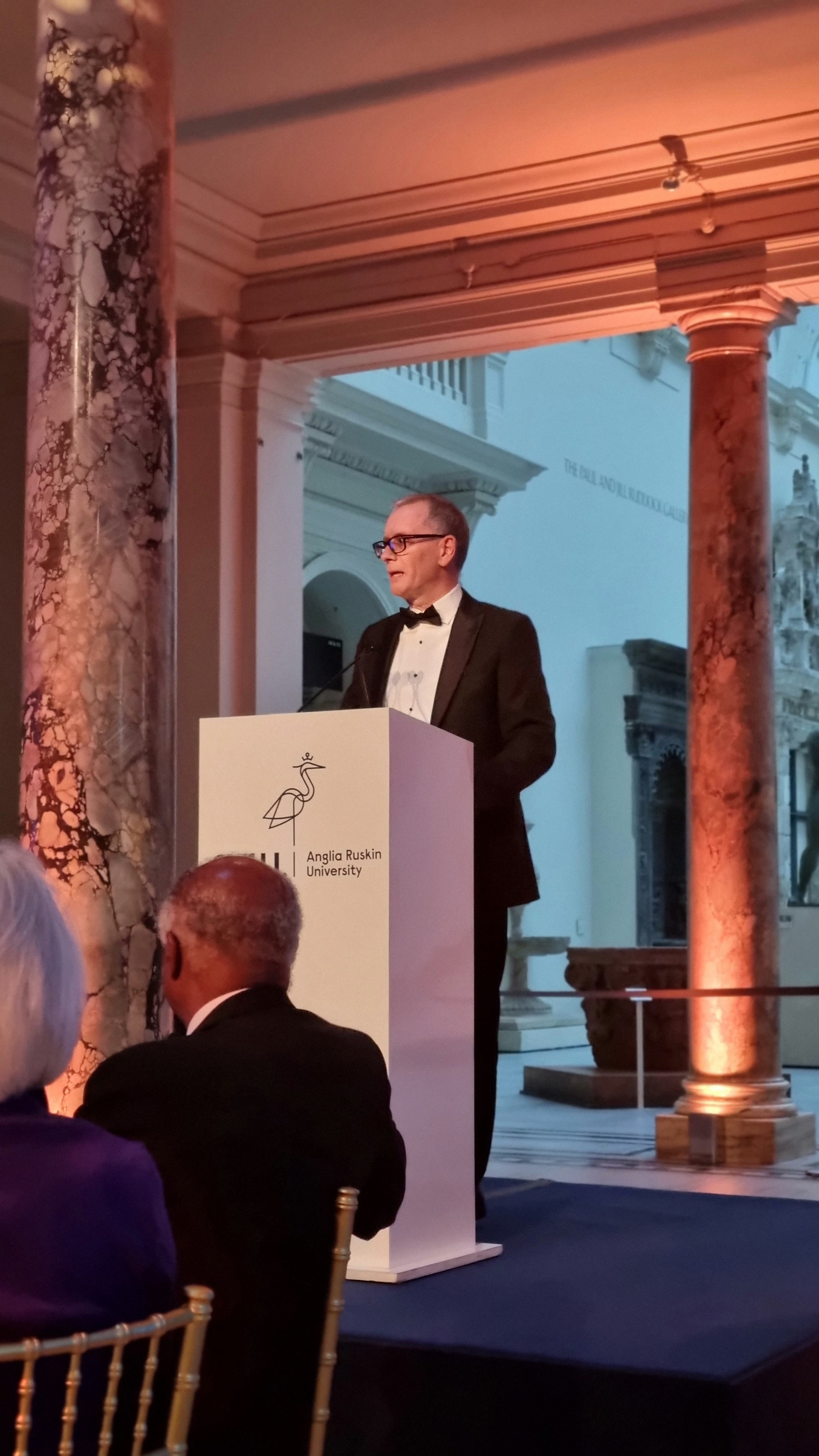
Vice Chancellor of Anglia Ruskin University Roderick Watkins speaking at ARU's Friends and Supporters Gala Dinner at the Victoria and Albert Museum in May 2023 in London.

Roderick Evan Watkins DL (born 1964) is an English composer and the Vice Chancellor of Anglia Ruskin University, in East Anglia.

== Early life ==
Watkins was educated at Gresham's School, the Oberlin Conservatory in the United States, where he took a degree in Philosophy and Composition, and then at the Royal Academy of Music. He won all of the Academy's most important prizes for composition, completed his doctorate, and became a Leverhulme Fellow. He also spent a year at the Institute for Research and Coordination in Acoustics and Music in Paris, where he later returned as a research composer. His teachers included Hans Werner Henze, Richard Hoffmann, and Paul Patterson.

== Career ==
Watkins taught composition and contemporary music at Canterbury Christ Church University, Kent, becoming Programme Director for Undergraduate Music. He was Professor of Composition and Contemporary Music there from 2005 to July 2014. In 2014, he was appointed as Pro-Vice Chancellor and as Dean of the Faculty of Arts, Law, and Social Sciences at Anglia Ruskin. In 2015, he became Deputy Vice Chancellor for Research and Innovation, then in 2019 Vice Chancellor.

== Honours ==
Watkin was appointed a Deputy Lieutenant of Cambridgeshire in 2021, one of the deputies for the county's Lord Lieutenant.

== Compositions ==
Watkins's compositions include a full-length opera, The Juniper Tree, premiered at the Munich Biennale in April 1997, and given its UK premiere at the Almeida festival in July of that year by the London Sinfonietta conducted by Markus Stenz. In 2003 he produced the electronic material for Henze's opera L’Upupa. His orchestral compositions include Red Light, Who Walked Between, Still, and Light's Horizon. Electro-acoustic compositions include The Looking Glass and Sound in Space.

Chamber music includes A Valediction: of Weeping, Last Light (for clarinet and piano), and At the Horizon (for flute and piano), a Clarinet Quintet and Breath. A piece for harpsichord and electronics, entitled After Scarlatti, was premiered on 29 April 2009 at the Sounds New Festival in Canterbury.

== Sources ==
- Independent review of Watkins's The Juniper Tree (3 July 1997), accessed 5 February 2010
- Review of Watkins' The Juniper Tree in The Musical Times, Vol. 138, No. 1852 (Jun., 1997), pp. 42-44, accessed 5 February 2010
