= Helen Odell-Miller =

British music therapist

Helen Odell-Miller OBE is a researcher and clinician in music therapy. She is Professor of Music Therapy and Director of the Cambridge Institute for Music Therapy Research (CIMTR) at Anglia Ruskin University in Cambridge, United Kingdom.

== Early life ==
Odell-Miller is originally from London, UK. The daughter of two medical doctors, Ruth and John Odell, she entered Nottingham University in 1973 to study music . Whilst at Nottingham, her musician teacher sister Jill was studying music in another university, and discovered literature on music therapy which inspired Odell-Miller. Later, while playing in Williams' orchestra, The Apollo Symphony Orchestra in Oxford, Odell-Miller met Jenny Wigram, wife of the late pioneer of music therapy, Tony Wigram. Wigram had completed his music therapy training with Juliette Alvin at the Guildhall School of Music and Drama, which led to Odell-Miller applying for music therapy training. Following completion of her BA Hons in music in 1976 at Nottingham University, she began her post-graduate diploma in music therapy at Guildhall School of Music at the age of 21. Odell-Miller completed her first clinical placement with Juliette Alvin at St. Charles' Hospital in West London, on a surgical ward with men with physical disabilities from amputations.

== Personal life ==
Odell-Miller married Michael Miller, a psychotherapist, in 1981, meeting him at Fulbourn Hospital when she was setting music therapy up there. They have two children.

== Early career ==
Following completion of her post-graduate diploma in 1977, Odell-Miller began working in a new full time post at St Ida Darwin Hospital, near Cambridge, setting up a new music therapy service for adults and children with learning disabilities. Her clinical practice mainly involved group work, following an active and multidisciplinary approach in working with physiotherapists, nurses and occupational therapists. Here she developed an interest in research under the supervision of Malcolm Adams, investigating priorities for music therapy services by gathering data from the staff team in 1978-79.

Through her involvement with the organisation SCOPE, a community of creative arts therapies advocates, Odell-Miller came to develop and defend music therapy and its autonomous position as a psychological therapy. This led to the creation of a full-time music therapy post at Fulbourn Hospital in 1980. She subsequently developed four new music therapy posts and the first music therapy post in Cambridge in Child and Family. She continued to work in adult mental health and family psychiatry, pioneering links between psychotherapy and psychoanalytic theory, and music therapy in particular. During these posts she developed improvisational approaches in music therapy practice. She was especially interested in navigating through the balance between talking and playing with a music therapy session.

== Music therapy profession ==
Odell-Miller, along with her colleagues Tony Wigram and Leslie Bunt, was instrumental to early development of the music therapy profession in the UK, negotiating with the government and achieving professional recognition for music therapists. She was involved in the establishment of the Courses Liaison Committee for the Association of Professional Music Therapists, as well as the training standards for the Council for Professions Supplementary to Medicine Arts Therapists' Board, served as the advisor to the Department of Health for music therapy for 11 years, and took a lead role in the documentation for the Health Professions Council (now known as the HCPC) for Standards of Practice and Standards of Education for Arts Therapists.

Once the profession had gained greater recognition, she advocated for the switch from Postgraduate Diploma to MA level training to practice as a music therapist, thereby aligning the UK with European curriculums. In 2016 she was awarded Officer of the British Empire (OBE) for her services to music therapy.

== Music therapy training at Anglia Ruskin University ==
Odell-Miller has been affiliated with Anglia Ruskin University since 1994 when she co-founded the MA Music Therapy training at then Anglia Polytechnic, with Amelia Oldfield. Since then she has continued to teach and supervise students on the MA Music Therapy and achieving professorship in Music Therapy in 2008. She has supervised twelve PhDs to completion, and is currently supervising twelve PhD students in music therapy and dramatherapy. She set up the music therapy clinic at the Jerome Booth Music Therapy Centre in 2007, which is also now used for music therapy training. The clinic is also used for music therapy sessions by freelance and private music therapists.

== Cambridge Institute for Music Therapy Research ==
Odell-Miller set up the Cambridge Institute for Music Therapy Research (CIMTR) in 2017 with colleagues, including Prof Jörg Fachner. CIMTR is a research institute based at Anglia Ruskin University, aiming to impact policy and practice by "advancing understandings of music therapy and its ability to effect positive change in health and human wellbeing." CIMTR is directed by Odell-Miller and co-directed by Jörg Fachner, Professor of Music, Health and the Brain. It focuses on five major music therapy areas: healthy ageing and dementia; children, young people, and families; mental health; neurorehabilitation and stroke; neuroscience of music therapy.

== Research ==
Odell-Miller's early work in mental health and psychiatry led to the completion of an MPhil at City University, where she worked with psychotherapists and psychiatrists to develop some of the psychodynamic theories that now inform music therapy practice. Her research led to further exploration of the client''s relationship with music, specifically improvisation and how these findings contributed to the approaches music therapists were using in practice. Her MPhil examining music therapy and dementia was completed in 1989. In 2008 she completed her PhD at the University of Aalborg, with a thesis "The Practice of Music Therapy for Adults with Mental Health Problems: the Relationship Between Diagnosis and Clinical Method", a mixed methods study using qualitative phenomenological methodologies (IPA) and statistical quantitative methodologies. She has recently been involved in developing the Music and Dementia Strategy in the UK, produced by the International Longevity Centre.

=== Homeside ===
Odell-Miller is principal investigator of the Homeside randomised controlled trial in the UK. Prior to managing the UK team, she was involved in the original research design. As well as leading the UK research team, she is also clinical supervisor for therapists delivering interventions as part of the trial, and PhD supervisor for doctoral students undertaking PhDs affiliated with Homeside.

== Publications ==
Bieleninik, L., Geretseger, M., Mossler, K., Assmus, J., Thompson, G., Gattino, G., Elefant, C., Gottfried, T., Igliozzi., Muratori, F., Suvini, F., Kim, J., Crawford, M., Odell-Miller, H., Oldfield A., Casey, O., Finneman, J., Carpente, J., Park A-La, Grossi, E., and Gold, C. (2017) 'Effects of improvisational music therapy vs standard care on symptom severity among children with autism spectrum disorder: The TIME-A randomized clinical trial', JAMA: 318 (6); 525-535.

Compton Dickinson, S.; Odell-Miller, H. and Adlam, J.; (2013) Forensic Music Therapy. London: Jessica Kingsley.

Baker, F.A., Bloska, J., Braat, S., Bukowska, A., Clark, I.N., Hsu, M.H., Kvamme, T., Lautenschlager, N.T., Lee, Y-E.C., Smrokowska-Reichmann, A., Sousa, T., Stensæth, K., Tamplin, J., Wosch, T., and Odell-Miller, H. (2019) HOMESIDE: Home-based family caregiver-delivered music and reading interventions for people living with dementia: Protocol of a randomised controlled trial. BMJ Open.

Gavrielidou, M and Odell-Miller, H., (2016) "An Investigation of Pivotal Moments in Music Therapy in Adult Mental Health". The Arts in Psychotherapy An investigation of pivotal moments in music therapy in adult mental health

Gold, C., Eickholt, J., Assmus, J., Stige, B., Wake, J., Baker, F., Tamplin, J., Clark, I., Lee, C., Jacobsen, S., Ridder, H., Kreutz., Muthesius, D., Wosch. T., Ceccato, E., Raglio, A., Ruggeri. M., Vink. A., Zuidema, S., Odell-Miller, H., Orrell, M., Schneider, J., Kubiak, C., Romeo, R. and Geretsegger, M., 2019. Music Interventions for Dementia and Depression in Elderly care (MIDDEL): protocol and statistical analysis plan for a multinational cluster-randomised trial. BMJ Open.

Hsu, M. H., Flowerdew, R., Parker, M., Fachner, J., & Odell-Miller, H. (2015). The impact of music therapy on managing neuropsychiatric symptoms for people with dementia and their carers: a randomised controlled feasibility study. BMC Geriatrics. 15:84 doi:10.1186/s12877-015-0082-4

Odell-Miller, H. (1988) 'A music therapy approach in mental health'. Psychology of Music and Music Education, 16:62-70.

Odell-Miller, H. (1989) An investigation into the effects of music therapy with elderly mentally ill people. M.Phil thesis City University, London.

Odell-Miller, H. (2001) 'Music therapy and its relationship to psychoanalysis' in Y.Searle and I. Streng (eds.) Where analysis meets the arts (pp. 127–152). London: Karnac Books.

Odell-Miller, H. (2003) 'Are words enough? Music therapy as an influence in psychoanalytic psychotherapy' in L. King and R. Randall (eds.) The Future of psychoanalytic psychotherapy. London: Whurr.

Odell-Miller, H., Hughes, P. and Westacott, M. (2006) 'An investigation into the effectiveness of the arts therapies for adults with continuing mental health problems'. Psychotherapy Research 16(1), 122-139.

Odell-Miller, H. (2007) The Practice of Music Therapy for Adults with Mental Health Problems: The relationship between diagnosis and clinical method .PhD thesis, Aalborg University, Faculty of Humanities.

Odell-Miller, H.; Richards, E. (2009) Supervision of music therapy: a theoretical and practical handbook. London: Routledge.

Odell-Miller, H. (2018) Response to Justine Schneider's article 'Music therapy and dementia care practice in the United Kingdom: A British Association for Music Therapy membership survey. British Journal of Music Therapy Volume: 32 issue: 2, page(s): 70-73.

Odell-Miller, H., Bloska, J., Browning, C. and Hannibal, N. (2019). Process and experience of change in the self-perception of women prisoners attending music therapy: The qualitative results of a mixed-methods exploratory study. Approaches, [online] Available at: Process and experience of change in the self-perception of women prisoners attending music therapy: The qualitative results of a mixed-methods exploratory study — Helen Odell-Miller, Jodie Bloska, Clara Browning & Niels Hannibal – Approaches.

Schaverien J. & Odell-Miller, H. (2005) 'The arts therapies' in G. Gabbard, J. Beck and J. Holmes. (eds) Oxford Textbook of Psychotherapy (pp. 87–94) Oxford: Oxford University Press.

Strange, J., Odell-Miller, H. and Richards, E. (2016) Collaboration and assistance in music therapy practice: roles, relationships, challenges. London: JKP.
