= Claudia Wascher =

Austrian behavioural biologist

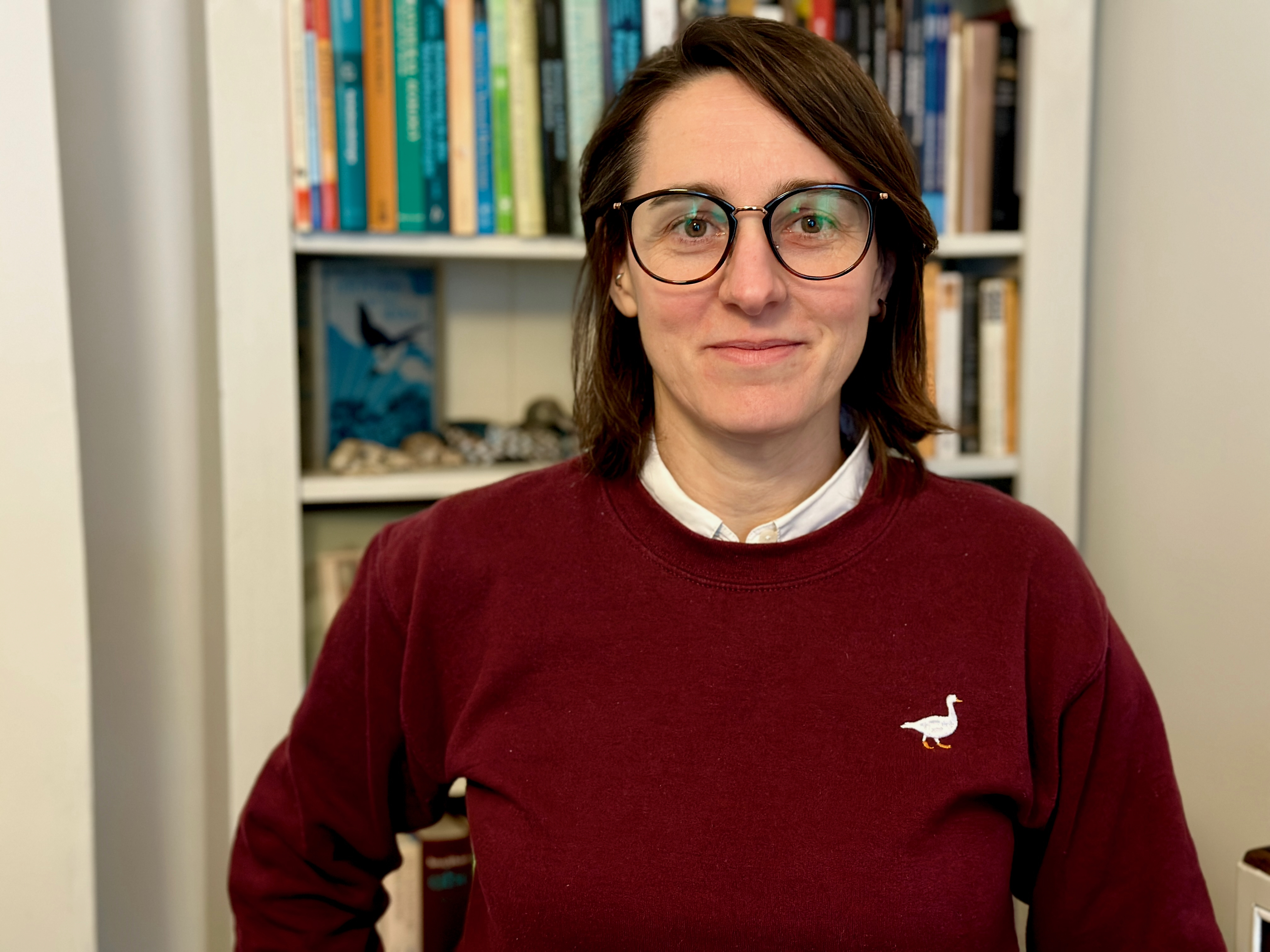
Professor Claudia Wascher, behavioural biologist at Anglia Ruskin University

Claudia A.F. Wascher is an Austrian behavioural biologist, specialising in avian cognition and the evolution of social behaviour, mainly studying corvids and greylag geese. She is a Professor of Behavioural Biology at Anglia Ruskin University (ARU), where she has been employed since 2015.

Wascher is an LGBTQIA+ academic and a strong advocate for equity, diversity, and inclusion in higher education, expressing a commitment to making academia more welcoming for everyone.

== Early life and education ==
Wascher, originally from Styria, Austria, showed an early interest in animal behaviour during an internship at the Konrad Lorenz Research Station (KLF) in Grünau, where she later conducted part of her research. She completed her Diplomstudium (equivalent to a combined bachelor’s and master’s degree) in Biology at the University of Graz between 2000 and 2005, and her PhD in Zoology/Animal Behaviour at the University of Vienna between 2005 and 2009. Her doctoral research examined heart rate modulation in greylag geese in social contexts.

== Career ==
After completing her PhD, Wascher held a series of postdoctoral research positions across Europe. Between 2009 and 2010 she worked at the University of Vienna and the KLF in Austria, followed by a postdoctoral appointment at CNRS and the Institut Pluridisciplinaire Hubert Curien in Strasbourg, France in 2011. She subsequently held positions at the Max Planck Institute for Ornithology in Seewiesen, Germany in 2011, the Norwegian University of Science and Technology (NTNU) in Trondheim, Norway between 2011 and 2012, and the University of Valladolid in Spain between 2013 and 2015.

In 2015 Wascher joined Anglia Ruskin University (ARU) in Cambridge as a Lecturer, and was promoted to Associate Professor in 2021. She became Professor of Behavioural Biology in August 2025 and delivered her inaugural lecture Social by Nature on the 11th of February 2026, coinciding with the International Day of Women and Girls in Science, remarking that it was “particularly special to mark this career milestone on a day that recognises the achievements and potential of women and girls in science around the world”.

Between 2019 and 2024, Wascher chaired the Athena SWAN Science & Engineering faculty committee at ARU Cambridge, contributing to the faculty’s silver award in 2024. She also served as co-Deputy Head of School for Research, Innovation and Income Generation, School of Life Sciences at ARU between 2021 and 2025 and has chaired the Animal and Environmental Biology Group’s Research Ethics Committee as well as serving on the Faculty of Science and Engineering’s Research Ethics Committee.

Since January 2025, Wascher has been Secretary of the Equality, Diversity, Inclusivity, and Accessibility (EDIA) committee for the Association for the Study of Animal Behaviour (ASAB).

In August 2026, Wascher was appointed Editor-in-Chief of Animal Cognition, a journal she had served as Associate Editor for since 2023 She has also held editorial board positions with Animal Behaviour (2018-2020), Avian Biology Research (2014-2024), Royal Society Open Science (2017-2024), and Frontiers in Comparative Psychology (2017-2021).

== Public engagement ==
In 2006, Wascher appeared on NETZ NATUR, a German-language TV documentary series produced by the Swiss channel Schweizer Radio und Fernsehen (SRF), discussing her doctoral research on heart rate modulation in greylag geese.

Wascher spoke about crow behaviour in relation to a crow named George, who has been attacking car windscreen wipers in Braintree, on the BBC The One Show in April 2020.

In August 2023 Wascher has appeared on the German-language Podcast Vogelguckerin, where she discussed avian cognition.

Wascher signed the New York Declaration on Animal Consciousness in April 2024, an international statement affirming scientific support for the study of subjective experience in non human animals.

Wascher also published, was interviewed for or mentioned in various international media articles.

== Research ==
Wascher’s research centres on the cognitive and physiological foundations of social behaviour, with a particular focus on the associated individual-level costs and benefits. Her primary study species are carrion crows, which live in flexible social systems, but she also works extensively on other social birds, including greylag geese. Her work has been influential in demonstrating that animal cognition is a process embedded within - and shaped by - social context, emotional processes, and the structure of social relationships, supporting a shift away from viewing cognition as a set of isolated abilities. She helped establish corvids as a model system for studying self‑control by conducting some of the first delayed‑gratification experiments in this group. She combines behavioural, physiological, and social network approaches to study how animals perceive and respond to their environment. More recently, Wascher has led research on the effects of anthropogenic disturbance on wildlife, with a particular focus on how fireworks and other sudden noise events affect the behaviour and physiological stress responses of greylag geese.

=== Social physiology and heart rate modulation ===
Wascher’s early research on heart rate modulation has shown that social interactions have measurable physiological effects, increasing the heart rate significantly not only during direct interactions but also when individuals observe interactions involving their mate or close affiliates. These findings indicate that social birds experience differentiated emotional arousals in response to social events and monitor and respond to third‑party social dynamics.

In a later review, Wascher synthesised four decades of research showing that heart‑rate modulation provides a reliable proxy for emotional arousal in social and cognitive contexts in animals and can be more cost‑effective than other commonly used non‑invasive physiological stress response measures, such as faecal hormone sampling.

=== Delayed gratification and fairness ===
Wascher’s experimental work with corvids has been central to expanding the taxonomic scope of research on delayed gratification and inequity aversion, topics previously dominated by primate studies A foundation of future‑oriented decision‑making is self‑control, which she examined using delayed gratification tasks with corvids. Her research showed that when presented with an immediate reward but given the opportunity to wait for a higher quality or higher quantity alternative, corvids were willing to wait for the higher quality option but not the higher quantity one, with some individuals waiting for up to ten minutes.

Together with Thomas Bugnyar, Wascher was the first to document a behavioural response to inequity in crows and ravens, showing that in a token exchange task, individuals who witnessed a partner receiving a higher‑quality reward or obtaining a reward without working, decreased their performance in the task and may refuse their own reward. This indicates that corvids are sensitive to both inequity in outcome (unequal rewards) and inequity in work effort, mirroring a cognitive mechanisms thought to have been crucial in the evolution of human cooperation.

=== Social recognition and communication ===
Wascher also investigates social recognition and communication, and provided first evidence that carrion crows can discriminate between familiar and unfamiliar heterospecific calls, suggesting that social knowledge extends across species boundaries and is encoded in acoustic cues. She, alongside other contributors, was also the first to document differential responses to food-associated calls in ravens, showing that individuals responded more frequently to calls from familiar birds and, within this group, more often to calls from females and lower‑ranking individuals.

=== Anthropogenic noise disturbance ===
Wascher’s research on anthropogenic disturbance demonstrated that New Year’s Eve firework displays cause substantial physiological stress in wild greylag geese. Using transmitters that recorded heart rate and core body temperature, she showed that during the peak of the fireworks the geese’s heart rate nearly doubled and their body temperature rose by around 3%. The study found that elevated stress levels persisted for several hours after the fireworks ended, and that geese do not become desensitised to repeated annual firework events. This work highlights fireworks as a significant but under‑recognised source of wildlife disturbance, with implications for energy expenditure, winter survival, and animal welfare.

=== Citations and Funding ===
Wascher’s research has attracted significant scholarly attention, with more than 1,980 citations as of May 2026 (h-index: 24, i10-index: 44). She has secured over £900,000 in competitive research funding across her career, and in 2009 received a L’Oréal Austria Women in Science Fellowship for Young Female Scientists in Basic Research for her project Fairness and inequity avoidance in carrion crows, which was funded with €15,000.
