= Pips Bunce =

British bank executive and LGBT campaigner

Pippa "Pips" Bunce
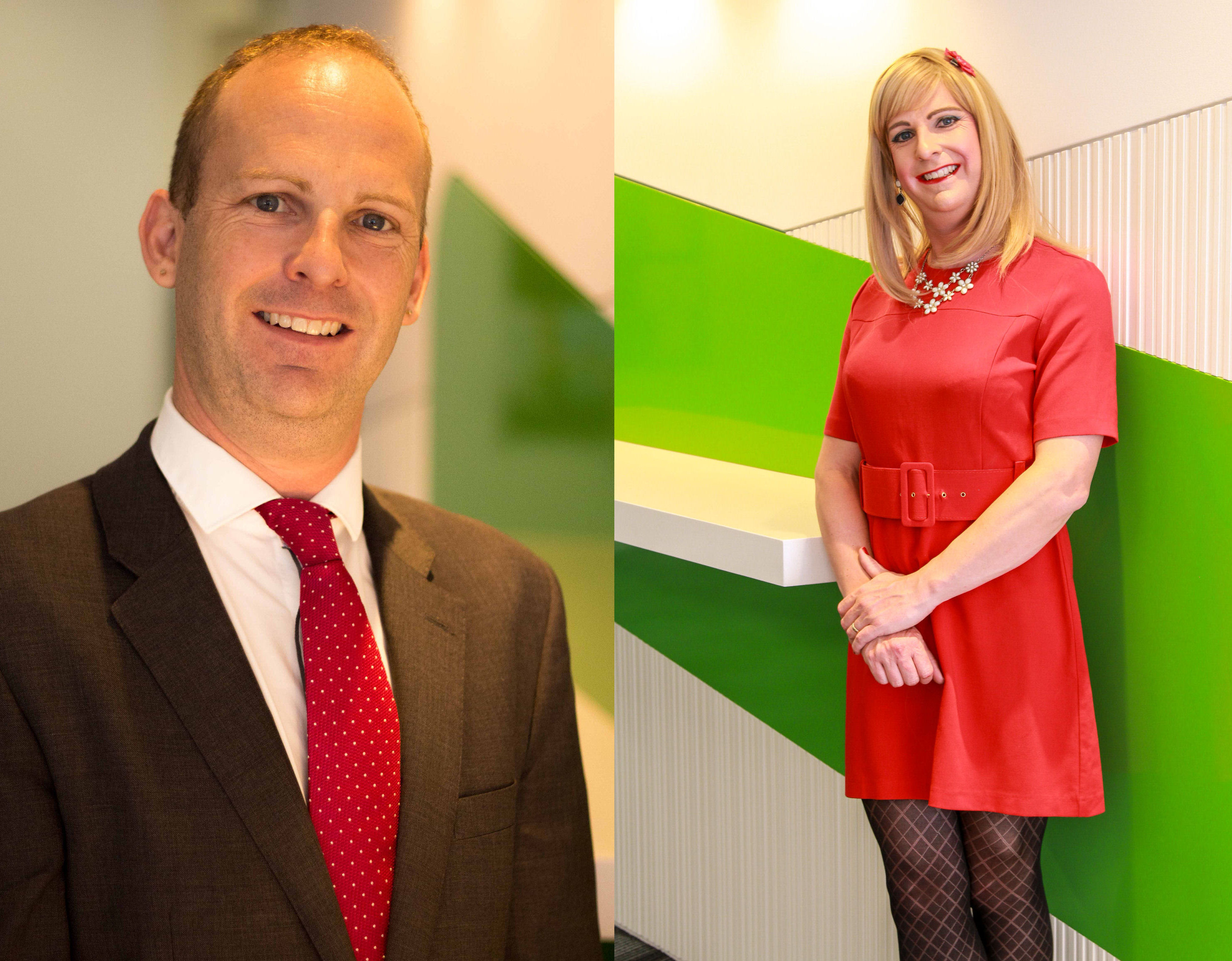
- Bunce presenting masculine (left) and feminine (right)
- Born: 2 June 1972 (age 54); England
- Education: Anglia Ruskin University
- Occupations: Technical Architect, Director, Leadership Fellow, Coach and Mentor, Keynote Speaker

Pippa "Pips" Bunce (born Philip Bunce) is a British banking executive who works to promote LGBTQIA+ and ally inclusion and advocacy. Bunce, who is non-binary and genderfluid, is a senior director at Credit Suisse. They serve as the Head of Global Markets Core Engineering Strategic Programs and as the co-chair of the LGBT Ally Program at Credit Suisse.

In 2018, Bunce won the Inspirational Leader award at the British LGBT Awards. Since 2017, they have featured in the Top 100 LGBTQI+ Executives list (hosted by the Financial Times and now Yahoo! Finance). In 2018, Bunce featured in the Top 100 Women Executives list by HERoes and published by the Financial Times. In 2021, they featured in the Business Insider LGBT+ Finance Top 7 Power list and in 2023 they featured in the BAM/LLYC Top LGBT+ execs in Tech and Venture Capital list. Bunce was also shortlisted for the 2023 Bank of London Rainbow honours Inspirational Role Model award. In 2022, Bunce won the Inspirational Role Model award in the British Diversity Awards.

Bunce is a global public speaker, panellist, presenter and media contributor across many fields of diversity and inclusion.

== Career ==
Bunce is a senior director at Credit Suisse, serving as the Head of Global Markets Core Engineering Strategic Programs. They also serve as co-chair of Credit Suisse's LGBT Ally Program, organizing diversity and inclusion activities and producing educational resources on LGBT inclusivity in the workplace.

Since 2019, Bunce has been an appointed Leadership Fellow at St George's House (Windsor Castle). They are a certified Enterprise Architect as provided by The Open Group Architecture Framework and hold a diploma and certificate as a HENKA Institute coach.

Prior to Credit Suisse, Bunce was an executive director at Goldman Sachs, worked at UBS and IT consultancies, and was a Technical Officer at BT Research.

== Advocacy and recognition ==
On receiving the Inspirational Leader award at the British LGBT Awards in 2018, Bunce made a statement that they were, "Amazed and humbled to win given how many amazing people where present and all who are making such a difference for all LGBTQI+ people, working to make the world a more inclusive space for all and sharing thanks to all for being part of that change".

Since 2017, they have featured in the Top 100 LGBTQI+ Executives list (hosted by the Financial Times and now Yahoo! Finance). In 2021, they featured in the Business Insider LGBT+ Finance Top 7 Power list and in 2023 they featured in the BAM/LLYC Top LGBT+ execs in Tech and Venture Capital list. Bunce was also shortlisted for the 2023 Bank of London Rainbow honours Inspirational Role Model award. In 2022, Bunce won the Inspirational Role Model award in the British Diversity Awards.

In 2018, Bunce was listed on the Financial Times and HERoes Champions of Women in Business list, which was open to trans and cisgender women and also non-binary people. They ranked thirty-second. Upon receiving the award, Bunce made a statement saying, "I am truly honoured and humbled by this award and am proud of the progress we are making towards all forms of gender diversity and equality."

== Diversity and inclusion ==
Bunce has been interviewed by the BBC exploring the identity of non-binary, gender fluidity in the workplace, and the connection between gender fluidity and the question of whether a Jaffa Cake is a cake or a biscuit.

Bunce features in the DiverCity Podcast talking about creating space for complete inclusion, the Human Centred Leadership Podcast talking about the importance of authenticity in the workplace and humility in leadership and the series Flex and the city on the topic of inclusion in financial services.

Bunce contributed to research by the Financial Reporting Council on supporting the progression of LGBTQ+ people to senior leadership positions through inclusive company policies. They have written in the Financial Times about the importance of the gender-neutral title Mx. They have spoken on a panel at the London School of Economics and Political Science, looking at the behavioural science behind the Pride movement, alongside Jane Hill.

They featured in a photo series published by Vice Media about the lives of women and genderfluid people and in the CorporateQueer exhibition, which was shown at the Houses of Parliament. They are a member of McKinsey & Company's Global LGBTQI+ Alliance, participating in research on discrimination.

They have featured in the WeAreTheCity inspirational profiles, the PwC Inspirational 50, the global Mindr Top 50, and People Management's D&I power list 2020.

Bunce has spoken at a panel on trans equality at Speaker's House in the Houses of Parliament and served as a judge at the Diversity, Equity and Inclusion in Tech Awards.

== Personal life ==
Bunce is a graduate of Anglia Ruskin University. They identify as genderfluid and non-binary and use she/her and they/them pronouns.

In an interview with the Financial News in 2017, Bunce said they knew they were "different" since the age of four and that they waited until their career at Credit Suisse was established before publicly coming out.

Bunce is married and has two children.
