= Mark Wood (businessman) =

British entrepreneur (born 1953)

- Born: 1953 (age 72–73); County Durham, England, UK
- Citizenship: British
- Occupation: Chairman of Paternoster
- Children: One son, two daughters

Gregory Mark Wood CBE (born 1953 in County Durham) has been at the helm of several financial services and technology start-ups, both in the UK and New York City.

== Career ==
Wood began his career with the accountancy firm Price Waterhouse (PwC). He also held posts in Commercial Union, MAI plc, British & Commonwealth, and Barclays.

After running the AA's insurance arm for three years, Wood was made chief executive of Axa Equity & Law. Buying into Sun Life put him in charge of a FTSE 100 company which subsequently bought Guardian Royal Exchange and set about integrating the group. In 2001, Wood moved from Axa to join Prudential plc and became its UK and European Chief Executive. In 2006, Wood's work in re-establishing Prudential plc as a leader in the UK insurance market became the subject of a case study by the International Institute for Management Development.

In 2005 he founded and became chief executive of Paternoster; a regulated insurance company that takes on the risks associated with companies’ final salary/defined benefit pension schemes. The company received backing of £500 million, led by Deutsche Bank. In 2009, Wood became the deputy chairman.

He is chairman of Digitalis, which specialises in Online Reputation Management; and audit committee chairman and non-executive director of the RAC Limited. He was formerly chairman of Beta London Advertising and Lloyds Insurer Chaucer PLC. He was CEO of Jardine Lloyd Thompson Employee Benefits from 2011 to 2014. He is a regular commentator in the press on pensions and insurance. Wood is also chairman of PensionBee Limited, Acquis Insurance, Utility Bidder, and Leakbot.

In 2010, Wood received an honorary doctorate in business administration from Anglia Ruskin University.

== Charity work ==
Wood is the former chairman of the NSPCC (National Society for the Prevention of Cruelty to Children), serving for nine years until he left the role in October 2019. He also ran the Full Stop campaign to raise £280m through events such as a dinner with Bill Clinton and Elton John in St Petersburg.

Woods is a Trustee at the Brooklands Museum in Surrey, and also sits on the Appeal Board of the Multiple Sclerosis Society.

Wood was appointed Commander of the Order of the British Empire (CBE) in the 2017 Birthday Honours for services to children and young people for his work with the NSPCC.
