= Aramis (disambiguation) =

Aramis is one of the title characters in the novel The Three Musketeers by Alexandre Dumas, père.

Aramis may also refer to:

- Aramis (personal rapid transit), personal rapid transit test project run by Matra in the 1980s in Paris
  - Aramis, or the Love of Technology, a book about the transit project by Bruno Latour
- Aramis (horse), (1977-1989) , a German show jumper who competed for Canada in the US (Los Angeles) 1984 Summer Olympics
- Aramis (fragrance), brand produced by Estée Lauder Inc.
- USS Aramis
- a variety of hops grown in France
- Aramis Group, a French company that operates in online multi-brand purchase and sale of used and refurbished cars

== Places ==
- Aramis, Ethiopia, where fossil of Australopithecus afarensis have been found
- Aramis Range, a mountain range in Antarctica
- Yeremes, Armenia, also called Aramis

== People ==
- Aramis (wrestler), Mexican professional wrestler, also known by ring name Hologram
- Aramis Alvarez Pedraza, (born 1988) Cuban chess grandmaster
- Aramis Ayala, (born 1975) American lawyer
- Aramis Garcia, (born 1993) American baseball player
- Aramis Haywood, (born 1985) Panamanian footballer
- Aramis Knight, (born; 1999) American actor
- Aramis Kouzine, (born 1998) Canadian soccer player
- Aramis Naglić, (born 1965) Croatian former basketball player and coach
- Aramis Ramírez, (born 1978) Dominican baseball player
- Aramis Sartorio, (born 1976) real name of adult film actor Tommy Pistol

== See also ==
- Henri d'Aramitz
