= Stephen Boler =

English entrepreneur

Stephen Eckersley Boler (23 August 1943 – 1998) was an English entrepreneur who founded a business dynasty and in later life became a conservationist in South Africa.

He was born on 23 August 1943, in Middleton, Heysham, Lancashire. Boler started as a 16-year-old trainee at the multinational Unilever.

He made his first fortune in the 1970s, selling cut-price tyre and exhaust systems together with business partner Tom Farmer, who went on to launch the Kwik Fit chain. One of the trainee managers at the time was later founder of the High Street buy-and-sell business Cash Generator, Brian Lewis, who credits Boler with a major impact on his business life.

In 1980, Boler bought recession-hit Kitchen Queen, a fitted kitchen retailer from Moben Group. The company went into receivership in February 1982 and Boler quickly established a new venture; Kitchens Direct, before selling this to Kean and Scott (part of Michael Ashcroft's group; Hawley Leisure) in April 1984.

By 1989, Kean and Scott had become Home Improvement Holdings, under control of Henlys Group in 1987 and Boler purchased the group in May 1989. Boler renamed the business Limelight in 1991 and took the company public in a disastrous floatation in November 1996 which saw the firms value plunge from £175 million to £40 million by March 1998, although Boler personally made £40 million through the floatation. Limelight, later known as the HomeForm Group, included household names such as Dolphin Showers, Kitchens Direct, Moben Kitchens and Sharps Bedrooms. Homeform went into administration in 2011, and had quotes honoured by brand Wren Kitchens to protect consumer confidence in UK kitchen companies.

In 1983, he bought Mere Golf and Country Club in Cheshire, handing this over to his son Mark in 1994, when he was 22. Boler had separated from his wife, and his son, whom he sent to the independent school Millfield, recalls him as teaching lessons of working hard. Boler was the largest shareholder of Manchester City Football Club.

In later life, he turned his attention to conservation in South Africa, creating the Tswalu Kalahari Reserve in the Kalahari Desert. He bought dozens of farms covering more than a thousand square kilometres to create the reserve. His will specified that Nicky Oppenheimer, the South African entrepreneur, should have first refusal on Tswalu, and the Oppenheimer family now owns and operates it.

Boler died in Johannesburg of a heart attack in 1998, aged 55, while traveling to his game reserve. Another son, Nick, died in 2004, aged 33. Boler also had two daughters, Sarah Jane and Camilla.
