= We Buy Any Car =

British company

We Buy Any Car Limited
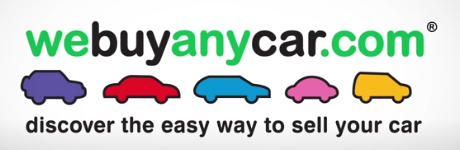
- Logo for We Buy Any Car Limited
- Trade name: webuyanycar; webuyanyvan
- Type: Subsidiary
- Industry: Motor trade
- Founded: 2 March 2006; 20 years ago
- Founders: Noel McKee; Darren McKee
- Headquarters: Hook, Hart, Hampshire, England, UK
- Number of locations: 550+
- Revenue: £1.1billion (2019)
- Parent: BCA
- Website: webuyanycar.com

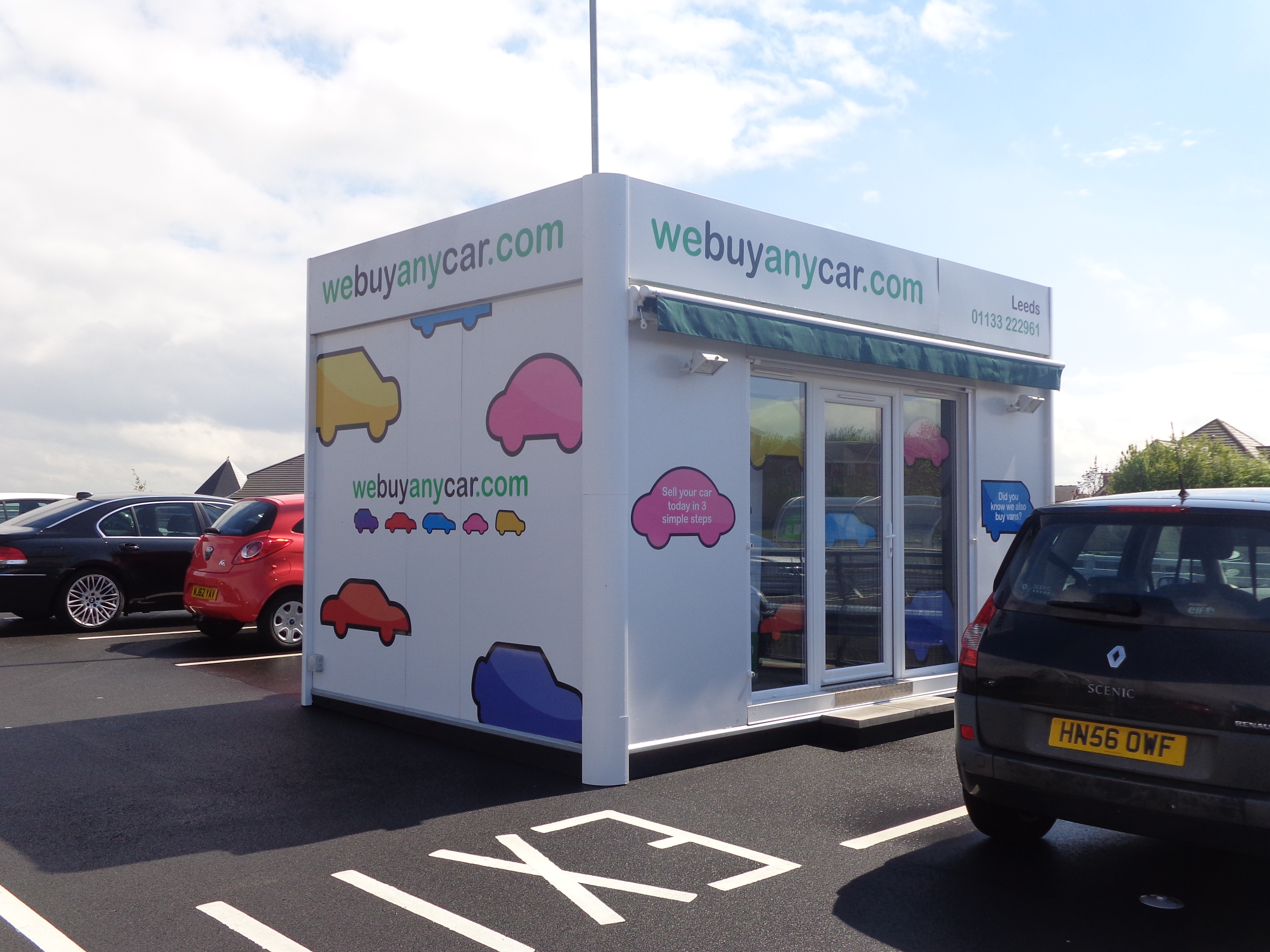
We Buy Any Car office in Asda car park at Middleton, Leeds

We Buy Any Car (stylised as webuyanycar) is a British online car-buying service and a subsidiary of Constellation Automotive Group, which also owns British Car Auctions (BCA).

== History ==
The company was founded by Noel and Darren McKee in 2006.

In 2013, the UK business was sold to British Car Auctions (BCA), now part of the Constellation Automotive Group.

The U.S. entity was later acquired by Frontier Car Group (FCG) in 2018, which subsequently became a subsidiary of the global consumer internet group Prosus (OLX Group) in 2020.

In November 2019, private equity group TDR Capital completed the purchase of webuyanycar.com's parent company, BCA, for a reported £1.9bn. In October 2020, BCA was renamed Constellation Automotive Group.

In 2025, webuyanycar.com was sold by Prosus (OLX Group) to a small US-based private equity fund. While originally founded in the UK, the brand operates as two entirely separate corporate entities in the United Kingdom and the United States. As of 2026, the company operates more than 550 locations across the United Kingdom.

== Research ==
In 2014, the company released the results of a mock Driving Theory Test on its website, revealing that six in ten drivers who sat the test, failed. The study showed that drivers in the 17-21 age group had the lowest pass mark of any age group, while drivers in the 46 to 65-year-old group had the highest pass rate.

In late 2018, research conducted by the company found that seven in ten Britons spend 11 hours in their cars during the Christmas period. Revealing that on average, families travel 311 miles, just under the distance of London to Edinburgh, to see extended family over the festive period. Collectively, British motorists travel over 5.9bn miles in cars over Christmas.

== See also ==
- Aramis Group
- Motorway (brand)
- CarsDirect
- Carwow
