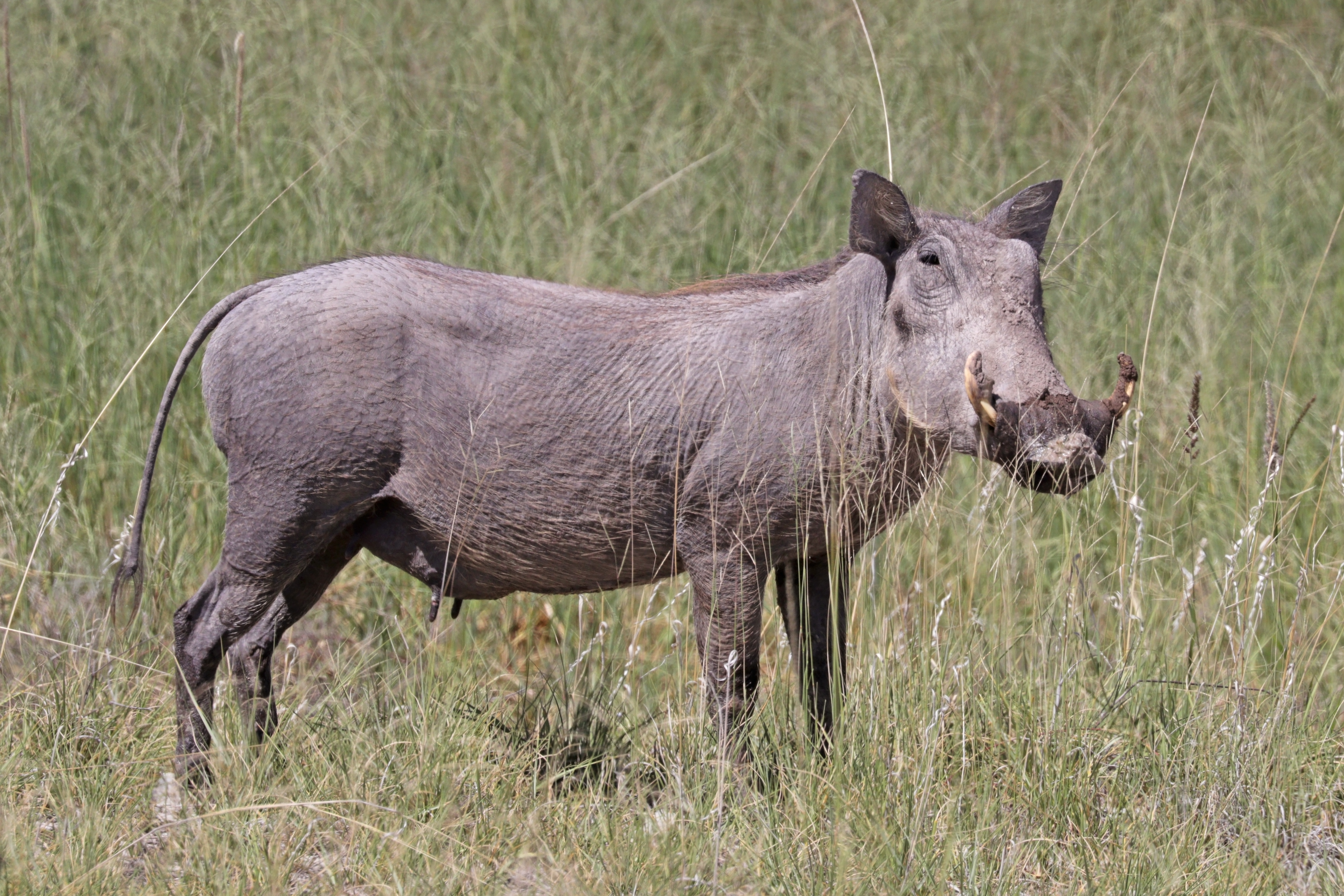
- Female P. a. sundevallii Etosha National Park, Namibia

Conservation status
- Least Concern (IUCN 3.1)

Scientific classification
- Kingdom: Animalia
- Phylum: Chordata
- Class: Mammalia
- Order: Artiodactyla
- Family: Suidae
- Genus: Phacochoerus
- Species: P. africanus

Binomial name
- Phacochoerus africanus (Gmelin, 1788)

Subspecies
- 4 subspecies; see text
- Distribution of the common warthog Possible range or accidental records

= Common warthog =

- Male P. a. sundevallii Tswalu Kalahari Reserve, South Africa

Wild member of the pig family

The common warthog (Phacochoerus africanus) is a wild member of the pig family (Suidae) found in grassland, savanna, and woodland in sub-Saharan Africa. In the past, it was commonly treated as a subspecies of P. aethiopicus, but today that scientific name is restricted to the desert warthog of northern Kenya, Somalia, and eastern Ethiopia.

== Subspecies ==
Image	Subspecies	Distribution
	Nolan or northern warthog (P. a. africanus) Gmelin, 1788	Benin, Burkina Faso, Cameroon, Central African Republic, Chad, Democratic Republic of the Congo, Ethiopia, Gambia, Ghana, Guinea-Bissau, Ivory Coast, Mauritania, Nigeria, Senegal, South Sudan, Sudan, Togo
	Eritrean warthog (P. a. aeliani) Cretzschmar, 1828	Eritrea, Ethiopia, Djibouti, Somalia
	Eastern or Central African warthog (P. a. massaicus) Lönnberg, 1908	Burundi, Kenya, Rwanda, Tanzania, Uganda
	Southern warthog (P. a. sundevallii) Lönnberg, 1908	Angola, Botswana, Eswatini, Malawi, Mozambique, Namibia, South Africa, Zambia, Zimbabwe

== Description ==
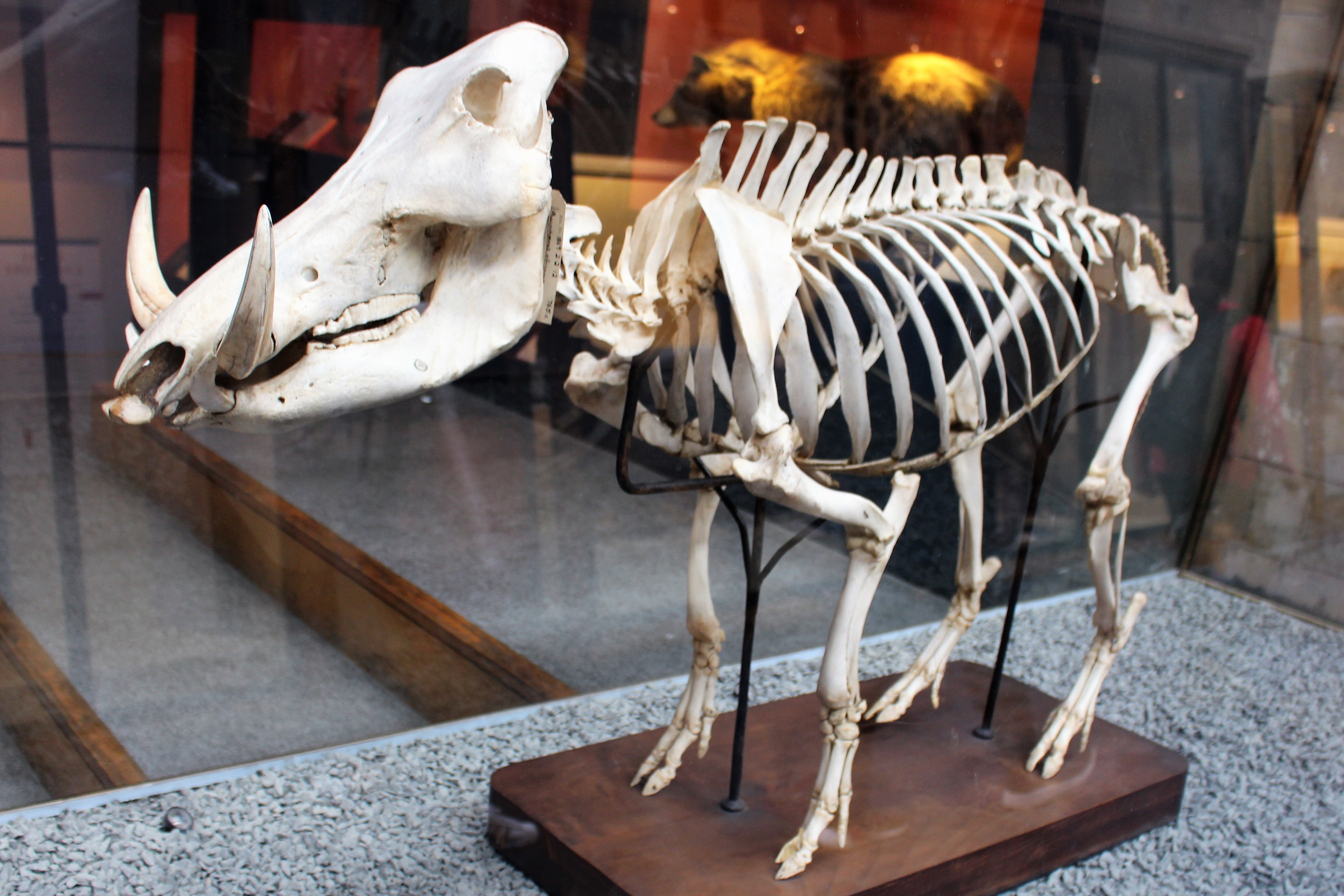
Skeleton at the Natural History Museum in London, England

The common warthog is a medium-sized pig species, with a head-and-body length ranging from 0.9 to 1.5 m (3 to 5 ft), and shoulder height from 63.5 to 85 cm (25 to 33 in). Females, at 45 to 75 kg (99 to 165 lb), are smaller and lighter than males, at 60 to 150 kg (130 to 330 lb). A warthog is identifiable by the two pairs of tusks protruding from the mouth and curving upwards. The lower pair, which is far shorter than the upper pair, becomes razor-sharp by rubbing against the upper pair every time the mouth is opened and closed. The upper canine teeth can grow to 25 cm (10 in) long and have a wide elliptical cross section, being about 4.5 cm (1.8 in) deep and 2.5 cm (0.98 in) wide. A tusk will curve 90° or more from the root, and does not lie flat, as it curves somewhat backwards as it grows. The tusks are not used for digging, but are used for combat with other warthogs and in defence against predators; the lower set can inflict severe wounds.

Common warthog ivory is taken from the constantly growing canine teeth. The tusks, particularly the upper set, work in much the same way as elephant tusks with all designs scaled down. Tusks are carved predominantly for the tourist trade in eastern and southern Africa.

The head of the common warthog is large, with a mane down the spine to the middle of the back. The skin is grey to brownish-grey or pinkish-grey, and sometimes blackish on the legs; sparse hair, variably black to pale brown or whitish, covers the body. The tails are long, and end with a tuft of hair. Common warthogs do not have subcutaneous fat and the coat is sparse, making them susceptible to extreme environmental temperatures.

== Ecology ==
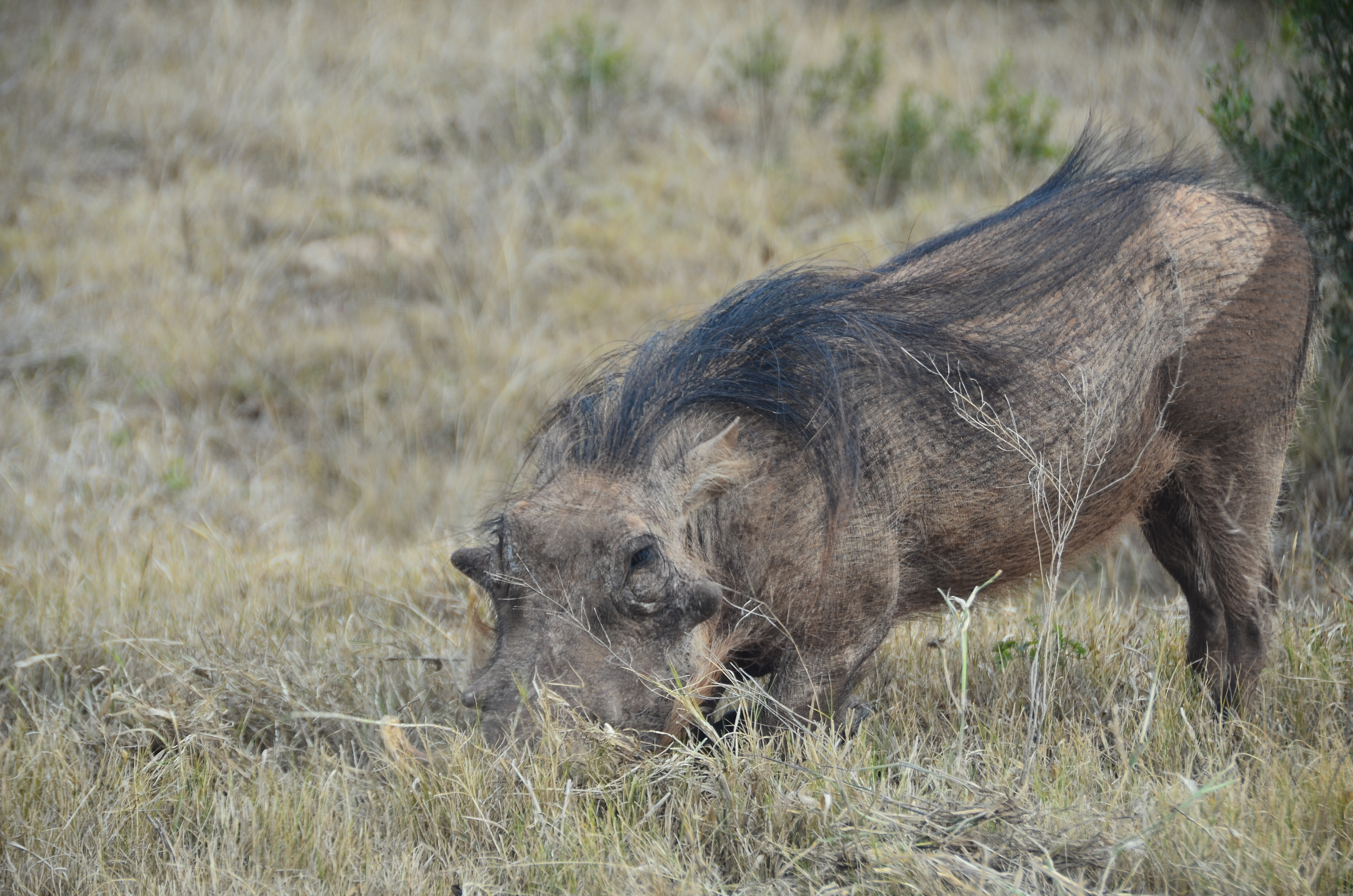
A warthog grazing at Addo Elephant National Park in South Africa

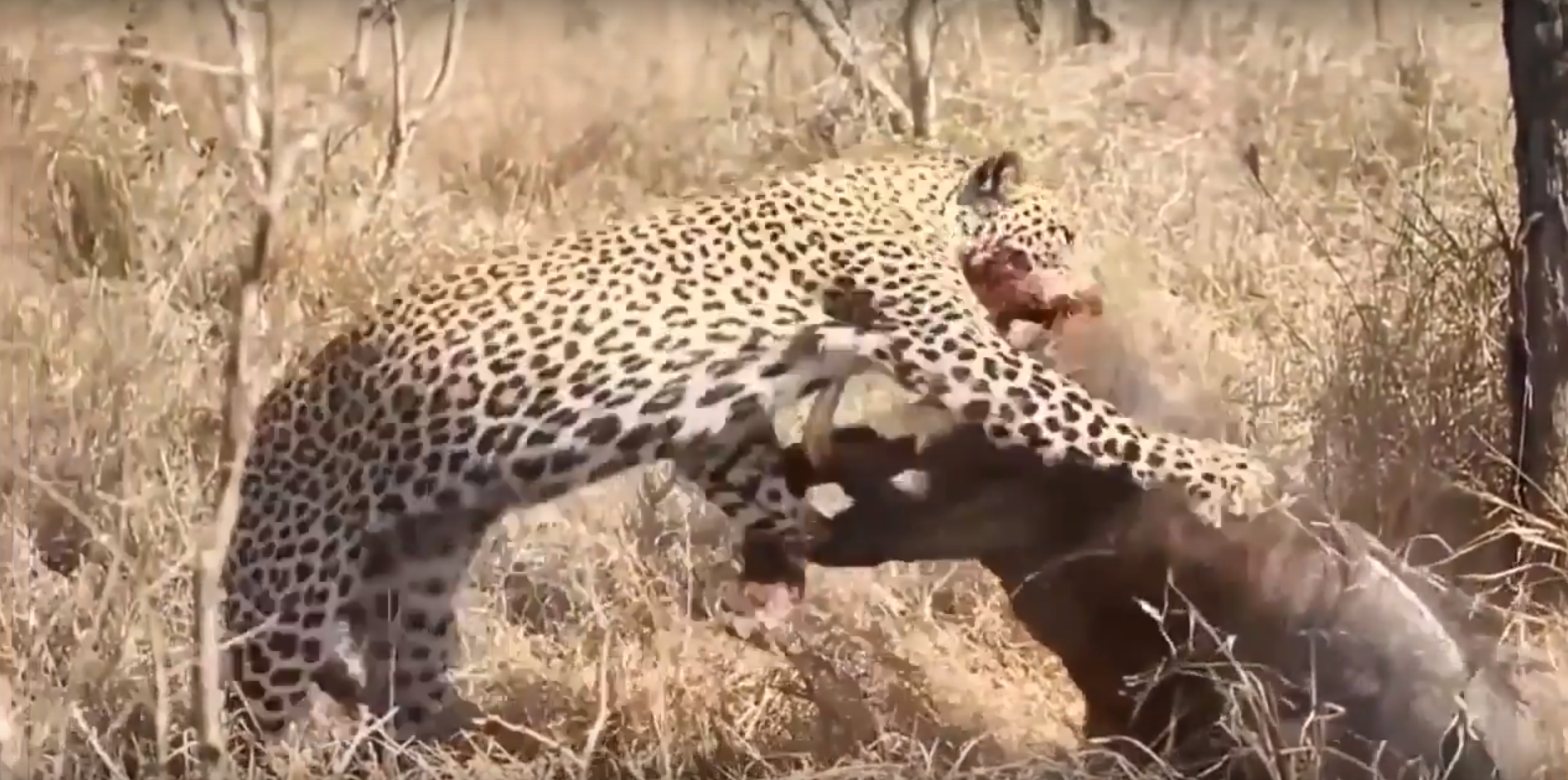
Warthog fighting a leopard

The common warthog is the only pig species that has adapted to grazing and savanna habitats. Its diet is omnivorous, composed of grasses, roots, berries and other fruits, bark, fungi, dung, insects, eggs and carrion. The diet is seasonably variable, depending on availability of different food items. During the wet seasons, warthogs graze on short perennial grasses. During the dry seasons, they subsist on bulbs, rhizomes, and nutritious roots.

Warthogs are powerful diggers, using both their snouts and feet. When feeding, they often bend their front feet backwards and move around on the wrists. Calloused pads that protect the wrists during such movement form early in the development of the foetus. Although they can dig their own burrows, they often occupy abandoned burrows of aardvarks and other animals. The common warthog commonly reverses into burrows, with its head facing the opening and ready to burst out if necessary. Common warthogs will wallow in mud to cope with high temperatures and huddle together to cope with low temperatures.

Although capable of fighting (males fight each other during mating season), the common warthog's primary defence is to flee by means of fast sprinting. When threatened, warthogs can run at speeds of up to 48 km/h (30 mph); they run with their tails sticking up and enter their dens rear first with tusks facing out. The main predators of common warthogs are humans, lions, leopards, cheetahs, crocodiles, wild dogs and spotted hyenas. Jackals, Verreaux's eagle owls and martial eagles sometimes prey on piglets. However, a female common warthog will defend her piglets aggressively. On occasion, common warthogs have been observed charging and even wounding large predators. Common warthogs have also been observed allowing banded mongooses and vervet monkeys to groom them to remove ticks.

== Social behaviour and reproduction ==
Common warthogs are not territorial, but instead occupy a home range. Common warthogs live in groups called sounders. Females live in sounders with their young and with other females. Females tend to stay in their natal groups, while males leave, but stay within the home range. Subadult males associate in bachelor groups, but males live alone when they become adults. Adult males only join sounders with oestrous females. Warthogs have two facial glands, the tusk gland and the sebaceous gland. Common warthogs of both sexes begin to mark around six to seven months old. Males tend to mark more than females. They mark sleeping and feeding areas and waterholes. Common warthogs use tusk marking for courtship, for antagonistic behaviour, and to establish status.

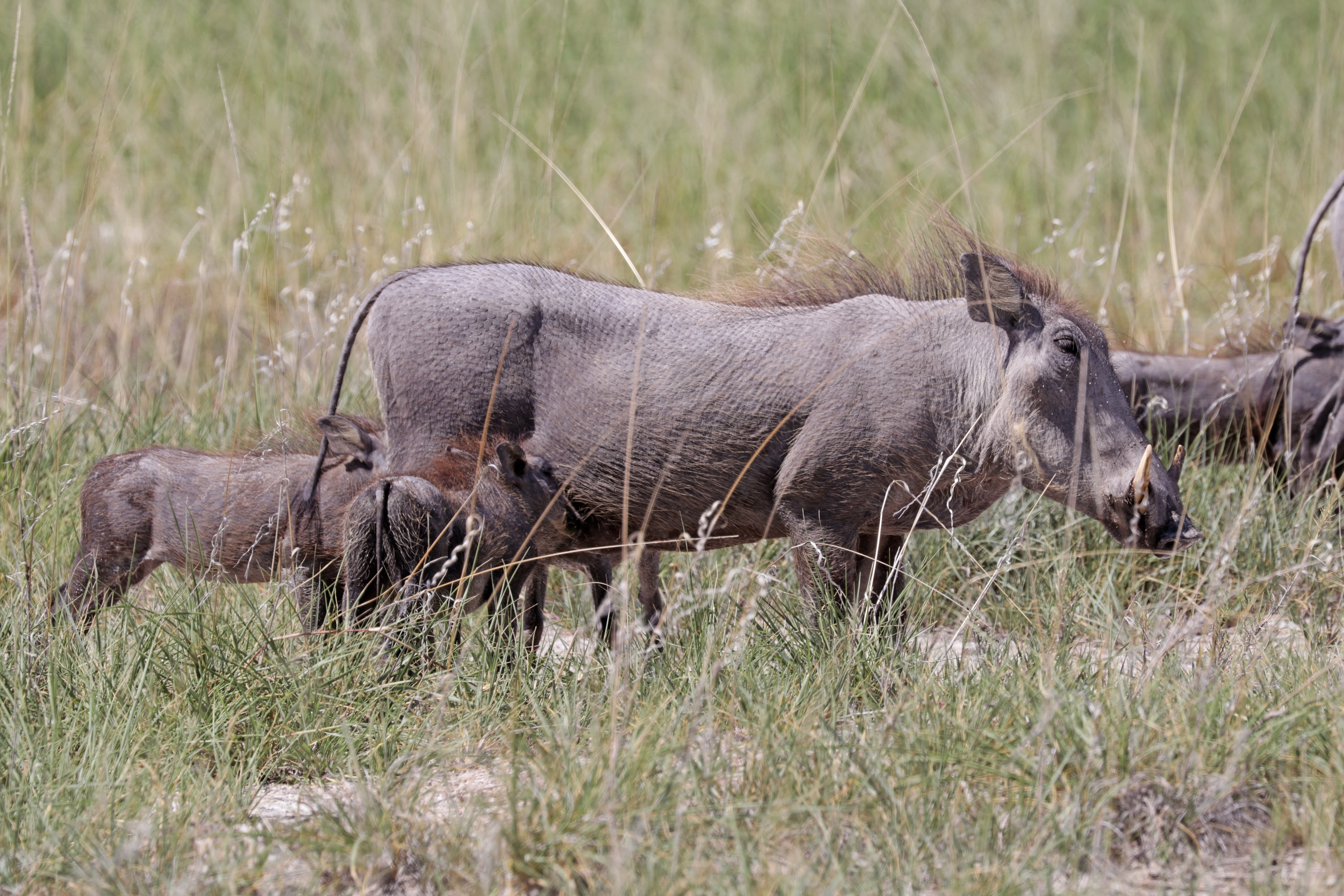
Suckling
Etosha National Park, Namibia

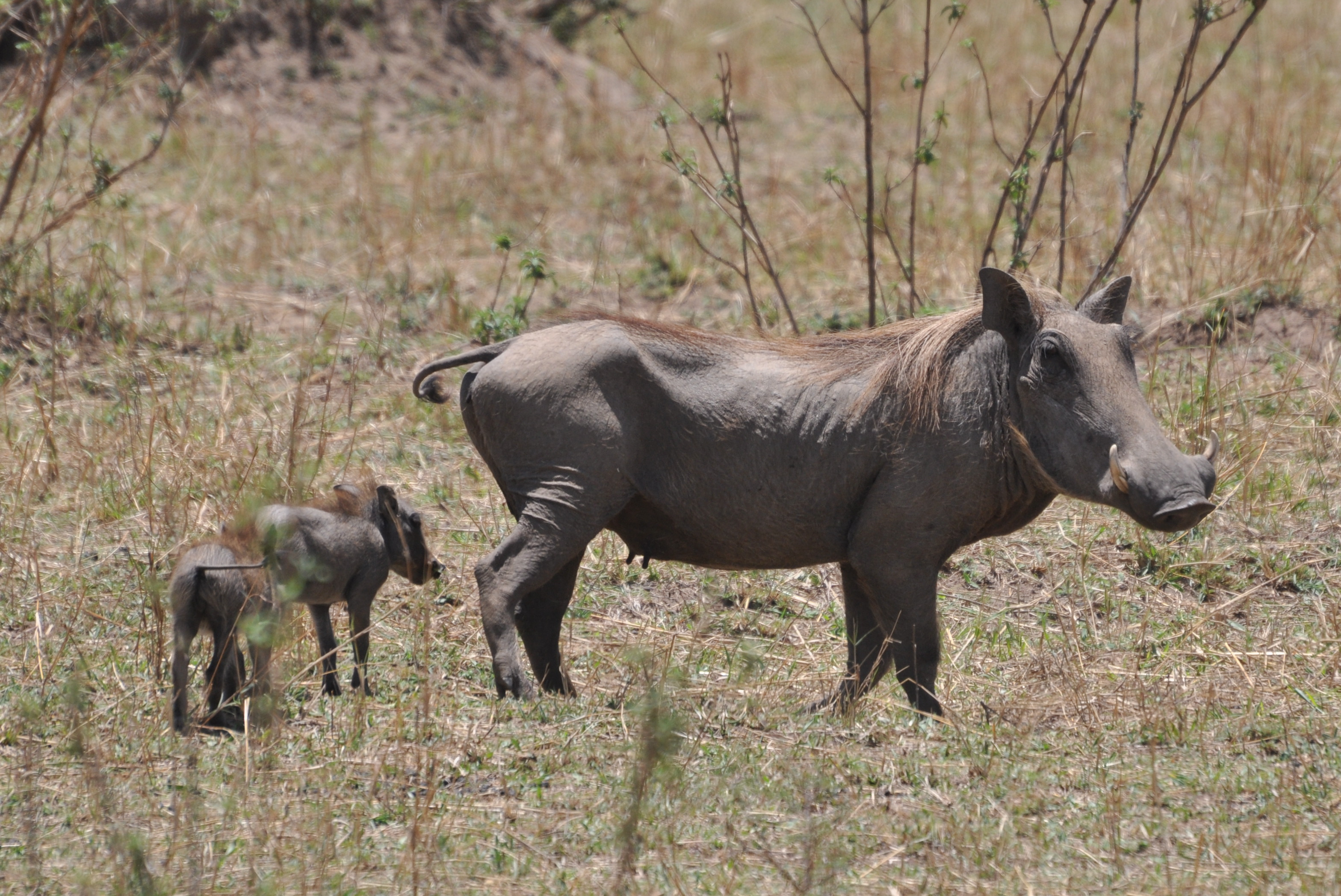
Female with young
Etosha

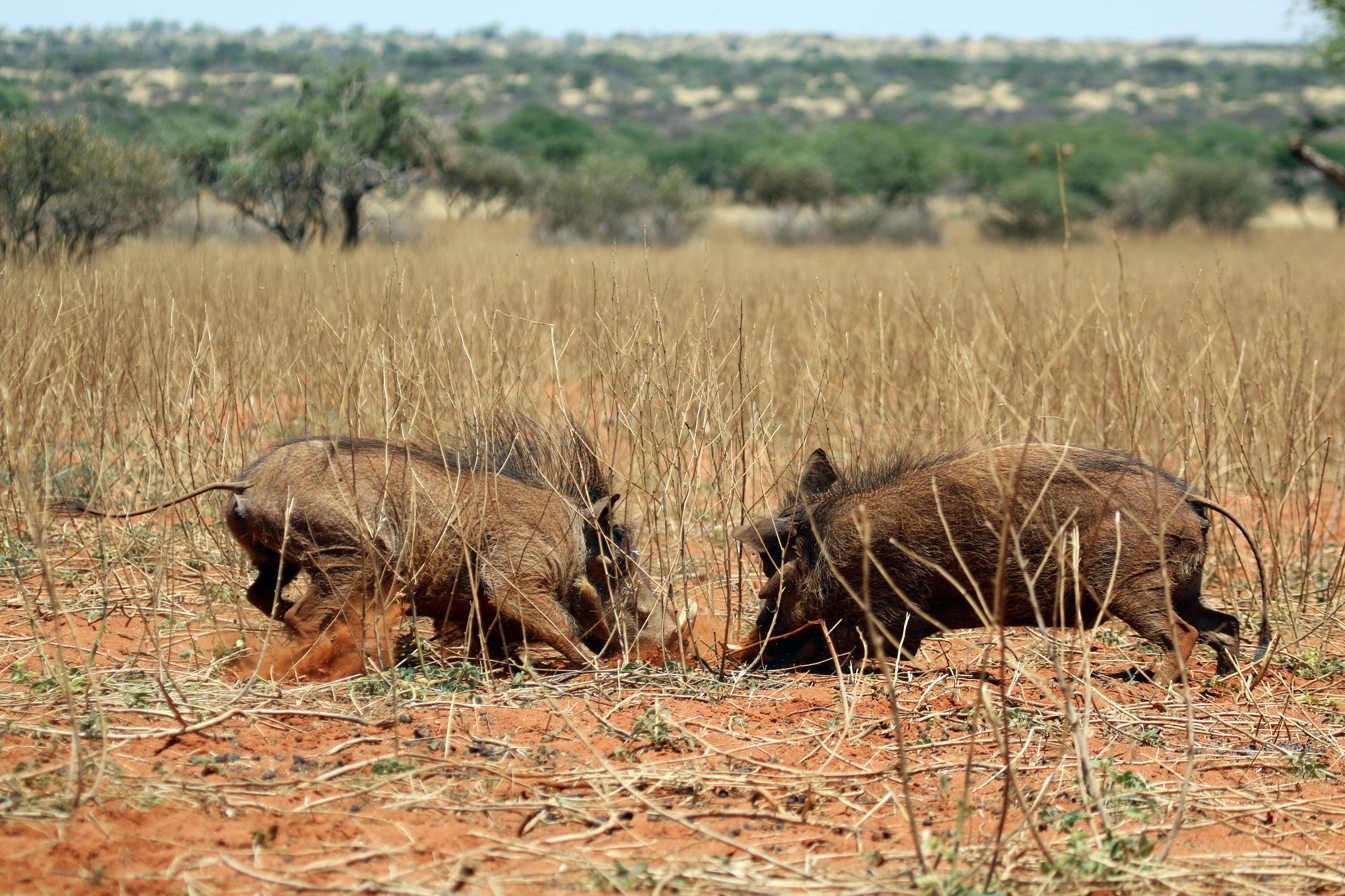
Young males fighting
Tswalu Kalahari Reserve, South Africa

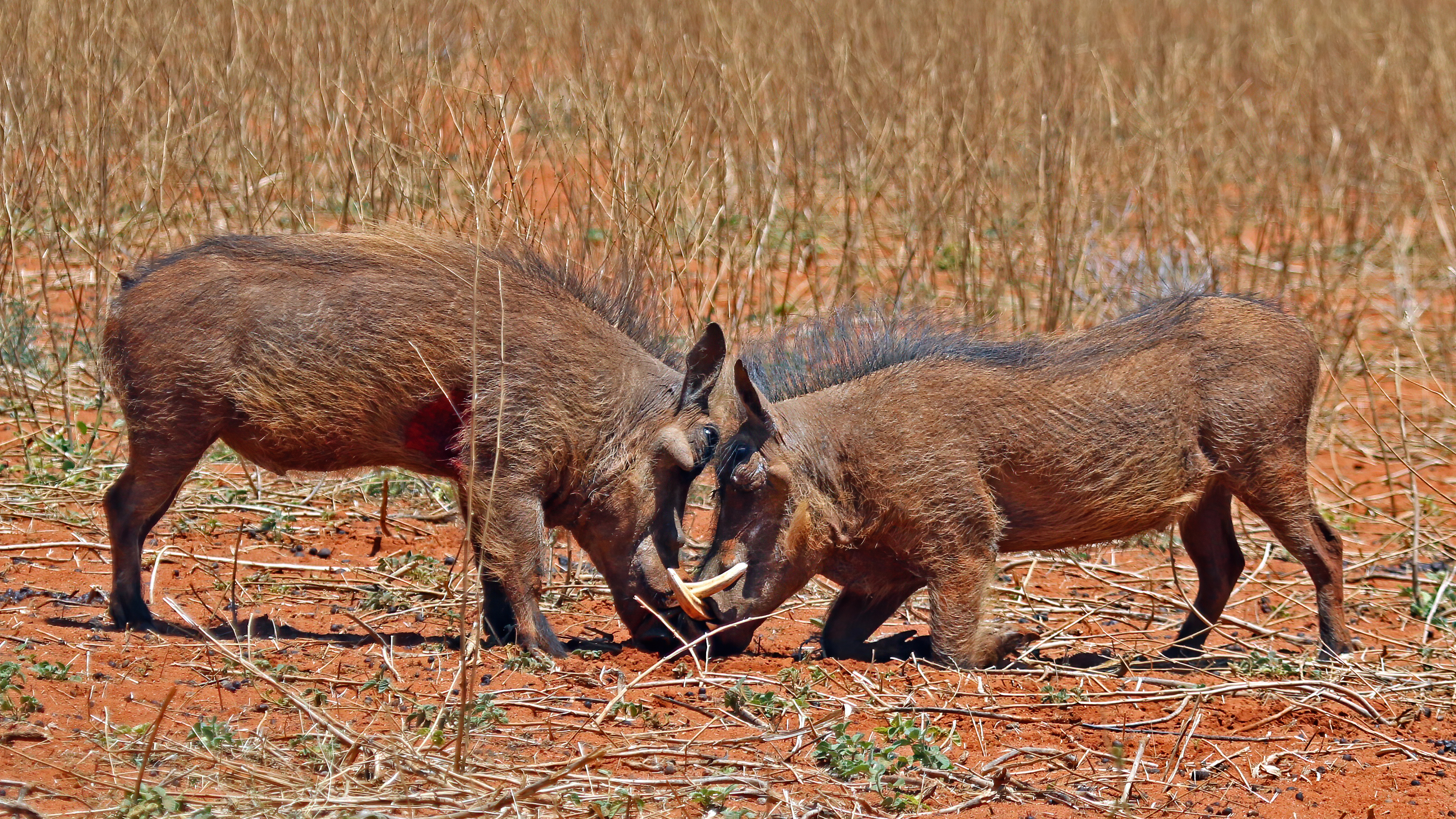
Young male kneels to protect throat
Tswalu

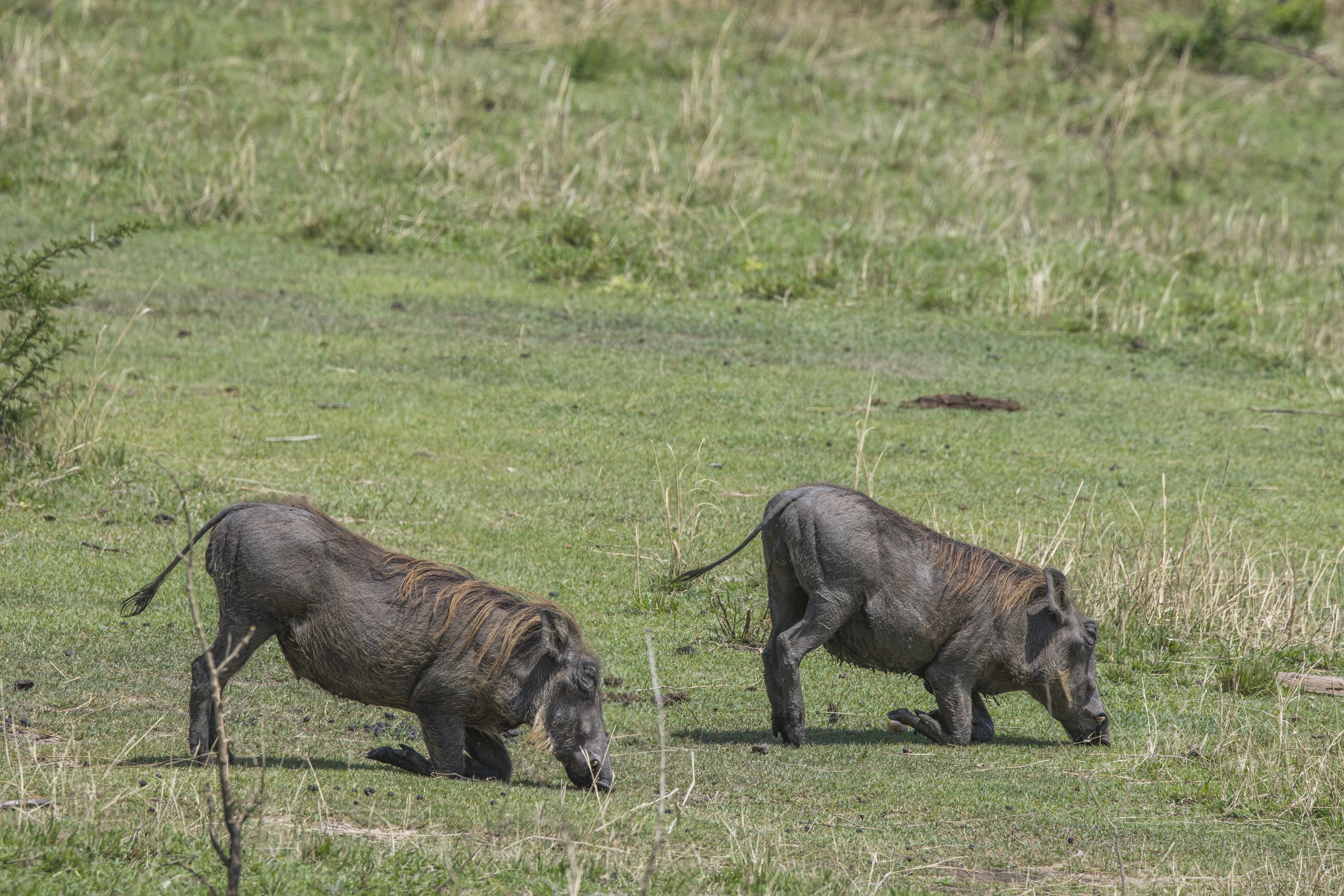
juvenile P. a. massaicus kneel to feed, Tanzania

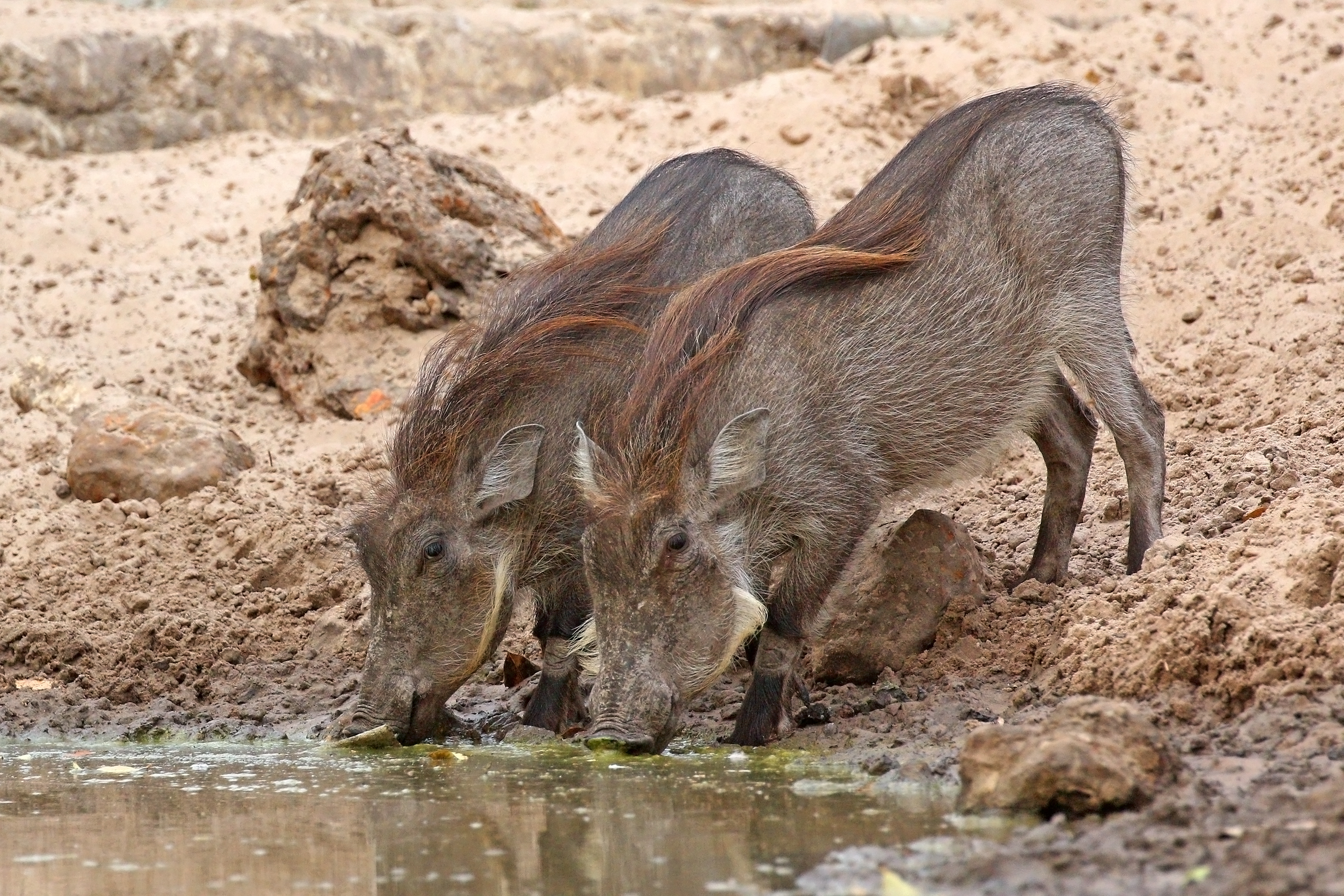
P. a. africanus juveniles
Senegal

Common warthogs are seasonal breeders. Rutting begins in the late rainy or early dry season and birthing begins near the start of the following rainy season. The mating system is described as "overlap promiscuity": the males have ranges overlapping several female ranges, and the daily behaviour of the female is unpredictable. Boars employ two mating strategies during the rut. With the "staying tactic", a boar will stay and defend certain females or a resource valuable to them. In the "roaming tactic", boars seek out oestrous sows and compete for them. Boars will wait for sows to emerge from their burrows. A dominant boar will displace any other boar that also tries to court his female. When a sow leaves her den, the boar will try to demonstrate his dominance and then follow her before copulation. For the "staying tactic", monogamy, female-defence polygyny, or resource-defence polygyny is promoted, while the "roaming tactic" promotes scramble-competition polygyny.

The typical gestation period is five to six months. When they are about to give birth, sows temporarily leave their families to farrow in a separate hole. The litter is two to eight piglets, with two to four typical. The sow will stay in the burrow for several weeks, nursing her piglets. Common warthog sows have been observed to nurse foster piglets if they lose their own litter. This behaviour, known as allosucking, makes them cooperative breeders. Allosucking does not seem to be a case of mistaken identity or milk theft, and may be a sign of kin altruism. Piglets begin grazing at about two to three weeks and are weaned by six months. Piglets quickly attain mobility and stay close to their mothers for defence. Common warthogs live for an average of 7 to 11 years in the wild. Captive specimens on the other hand can live for an average of 21 years.

== Conservation status ==
As of 1999, the common warthog population in southern Africa was estimated to be about 250,000. Typical densities range between 1 and 10 km^{2} (0.39 and 3.86 sq mi) in protected areas, but local densities of 77 km^{2} (30 sq mi) were found on short grass in Nakuru National Park in Kenya. The species is susceptible to drought and hunting (especially with dogs), which may result in localised extinction. The common warthog is present in numerous protected areas across its extensive range.

== As an invasive species ==
In 2020, it was noted that a population of warthogs, descendants of escaped individuals from game ranches, were running free in southern Texas in the United States.
