= CarSupermarket.com =

British used car retailer

- Trade name: CarSupermarket.com
- Type: Subsidiary
- Industry: Used car retail
- Predecessor: Motordepot
- Founded: 2001
- Founder: Philip Wilkinson
- Headquarters: Hessle, East Riding of Yorkshire, England
- Area served: United Kingdom
- Key people: Matt Barrick (director)
- Products: Used cars
- Services: Online vehicle sales, dealership sales, home delivery, vehicle financing
- Parent: Aramis Group (2021–present)
- Website: www.carsupermarket.com

CarSupermarket.com is a British used car retailer based in Hessle, East Riding of Yorkshire. The company operates an omnichannel model, selling used vehicles online with store collection and home delivery available. Since March 2021, CarSupermarket.com has operated as a subsidiary of the Aramis Group, a European used-car retailer majority-owned by Stellantis.

== History ==
The company was founded in 2001 by Philip Wilkinson and opened its first retail store on Clarence Street, Hull, in 2002. A second store opened in Hessle in 2004. The company traded as Motordepot before beginning a rebranding programme around 2020, under which several stores, including those in Barnsley, Hessle, Newcastle, Preston and Stoke, adopted the CarSupermarket.com brand. In December 2020, the company took over a former Car Store showroom on Newark Road, Lincoln. It became the sixth site to trade as CarSupermarket.com and the twelfth in the wider Motor Depot group. By the time of its 2021 sale, the group operated twelve stores in Barnsley, Birmingham, Grimsby, Hessle, Hull, Lincoln, Newcastle, Preston, Scunthorpe, Sheffield, Stoke and Worksop, along with vehicle preparation centres in Goole and Hull, and employed more than 400 staff.

In March 2021, a majority stake in the business was acquired by the Aramis Group, a Stellantis-backed pan-European used-car retailer.

Aramis, which had previously expanded into Spain through Clicars (2017) and Belgium through Cardoen (2018), floated on the Euronext Paris exchange in June 2021, with Stellantis retaining its majority holding.

Companies House list Aramis Group SAS as a person with significant control holding more than 50% but less than 75% of the shares and voting rights from 1 March 2021.

In July 2025, Aramis Group agreed to acquire the remaining 40% shareholding from founder Philip Wilkinson. Following the agreement, Wilkinson resigned, and Aramis Group chief executive Guillaume Paoli became a director. The transaction was completed on 30 January 2026, when the Wilkinson family holding company ceased to be a person with significant control.

== Operations ==
The company operates a hybrid retail model, allowing customers to buy vehicles either online or at its stores. By 2023, the group operated 11 showrooms in Hull, Hessle, Birmingham, Grimsby, Barnsley, Newcastle, Scunthorpe, Stoke, Sheffield, Preston and Lincoln. The company prepares and reconditions its used vehicles before sale, opening a dedicated reconditioning centre in Hull in December 2022.

It closed its Worksop site during 2023 and, in January 2024, closed its original Hull store, with staff transferred to nearby stores. As of 2025, the business operated 10 physical stores and two reconditioning centres. In 2026, the company opened its first store in 6 years in Stockport. Within the Aramis Group, the UK business operates as one of the group's national markets alongside France, Spain and Belgium.
