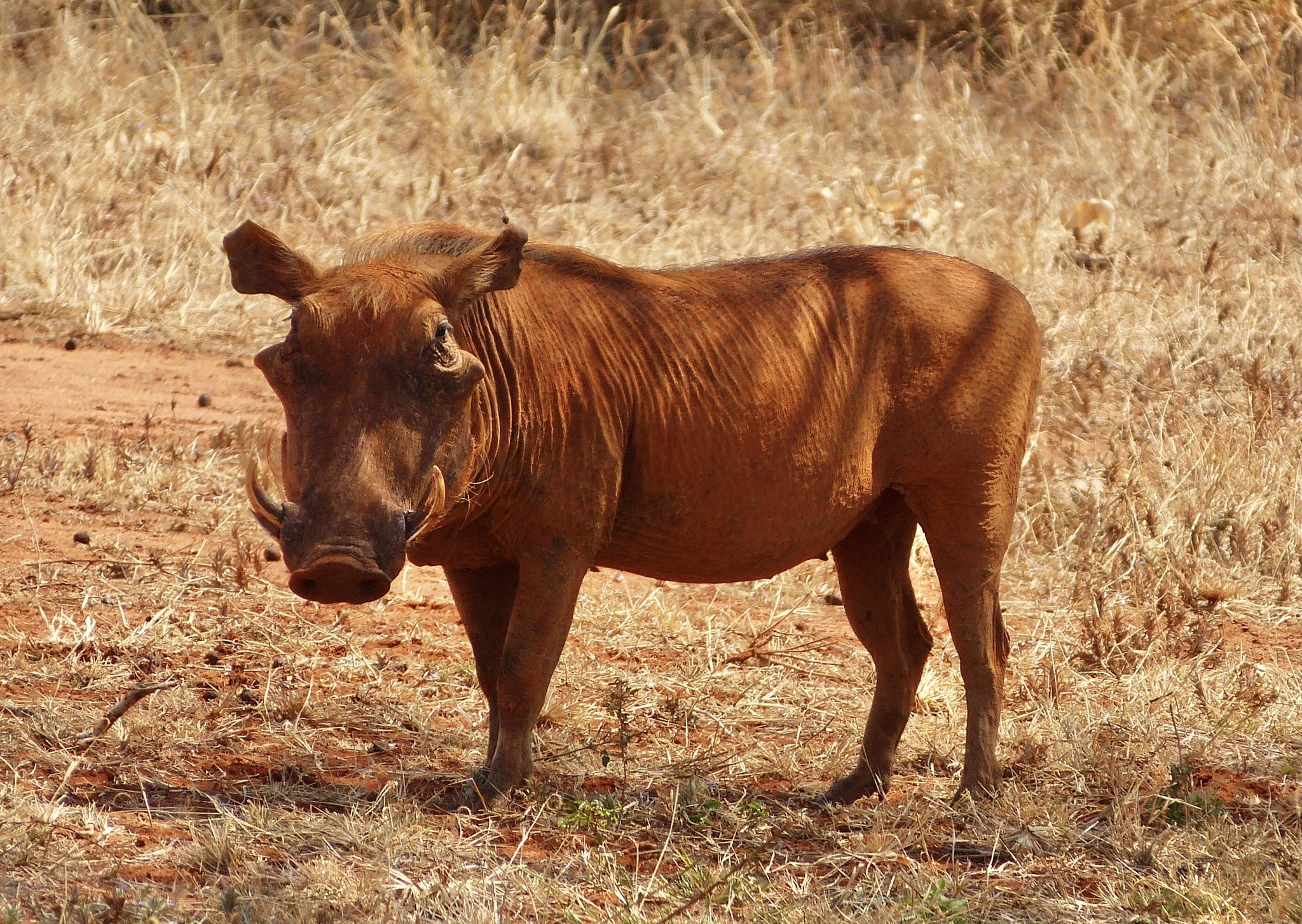
- P. aethiopicus delamerei

Conservation status
- Least Concern (IUCN 3.1)

Scientific classification
- Kingdom: Animalia
- Phylum: Chordata
- Class: Mammalia
- Order: Artiodactyla
- Family: Suidae
- Genus: Phacochoerus
- Species: P. aethiopicus

Binomial name
- Phacochoerus aethiopicus (Pallas, 1766)

Subspecies
- †P. a. aethiopicus Pallas, 1766; P. a. delamerei Lönnberg, 1909

= Desert warthog =

Species of mammal

The desert warthog (Phacochoerus aethiopicus) is a mammalian, artiodactyl-ungulate species of the pig and swine family (Suidae) native to the Horn of Africa region of East Africa. Two subspecies have been named: the Cape warthog (P. a. aethiopicus), which became extinct around 1865, had once inhabited South Africa, while the extant Somali warthog (P. a. delamerei) is largely found in Kenya and Somalia, some areas of Ethiopia, and potentially still inhabits parts of Djibouti and Eritrea.

== Evolutionary history ==
Fossils have been found from the Holocene epoch showing that two divergent lines of warthogs (Phacochoerus spp.) were in existence thousands of years ago. The ancestors of the present-day common warthog (P. africanus) had a different number of incisors from the ancestors of the desert warthog (P. aethiopicus) line. During the late 19th century, P. aethiopicus became extinct in South Africa. Subsequently, study of mDNA and morphological analysis has shown that the East African population of warthogs, previously thought to be a variant of the common warthog, are, in fact, surviving members of the putatively extinct P. aethiopicus.

== Description ==
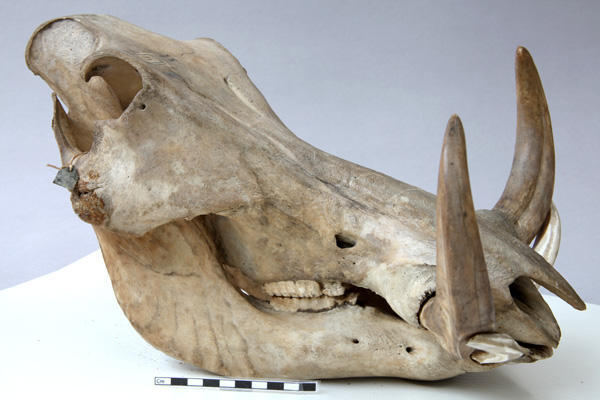
Skull of a desert warthog

The desert warthog is a stockily built animal growing to an average length of 125 centimetres (49 in) and weight of 75 kilograms (165 lb), with males being larger than females. It has a rather flattened head with distinctive facial paired protuberances ("warts") and large curving canine teeth that protrude as tusks. These are not present in juveniles, but grow over the course of a few years. They are larger in males than in females. The body is sparsely covered with bristly hairs and a denser region of hairs runs along the spine and forms a crest. The tail is long and thin and is tipped with a small brush of coarse hair. The general colour is mid- to dark brown, but the crest is sometimes whitish. The desert warthog differs from the bushpig (Potamochoerus porcus) and the giant forest hog (Hylochoerus meinertzhageni) in having facial warts and proportionately larger tusks.

Desert warthogs can be differentiated from the common warthog by their distinctive facial features, including curled-back tips at the end of the ears, lack of incisors, and generally larger snout. The suborbital areas in desert warthogs are swollen in the form of pouches that often extend to the base of the genal warts; these same areas in common warthogs have no such pronounced swelling. The species also has more strongly hook-shaped "warts", a more egg-shaped head, thickened zygomatic arches, and enlarged sphenoidal pits.

== Distribution and habitat ==
The desert warthog is native to the Horn of Africa. Its current range extends from southeastern Ethiopia through western Somalia to eastern and central Kenya. The subspecies P. a. aethiopicus, commonly known as the Cape warthog, once occurred in the southeastern parts of Cape Province and the adjacent parts of Natal Province, but became extinct around 1871. The habitat of the desert warthog is open, arid countryside including thin woodland with scattered trees, xerophytic scrubland, and sandy plains, but not upland areas. It needs regular access to waterholes, so may occur near villages and places where water seeps to the surface in otherwise dry areas.

== Behaviour ==
Desert warthogs live in social groups called "sounders", consisting mostly of females and their offspring, while males tend to live in solitude or form bachelor groups. A sounder occupies a home range of about 10 square kilometres (3.9 sq mi), which is usually centred on a water hole. The warthogs dig a number of burrows, or take over holes excavated by other animals, and move from one to another. Where the ranges of two different groups overlap, each may use the same burrow on different occasions. The groups do not interact to any great extent.

Desert warthogs are diurnal and are largely herbivorous. One of the older females leads the group and they forage for grasses, leafy plants, flowers, and fruit. They dig up rhizomes, edible tubers, and bulbs with their snouts and tusks, and will eat insects when food is scarce, and even carrion. They sometimes eat dung, including their own, and tear bark from trees.

Females come into oestrus every six weeks in the breeding season, which usually coincides with the end of the rainy season between March and May. Their frequent urination leaves scent markers that inform males of their receptive state. The gestation period is about 170 days, and a litter of usually two or three piglets is born in one of the burrows. The young begin to emerge from the burrow for short periods when about three weeks old, and as they get bigger, they follow their mother closely. They are weaned at three or more months, but remain dependent on their mother for several more months after that. She defends them from predators such as lions, leopards, cheetahs, and spotted hyenas. The desert warthog has specific warning grunts that alert the rest of the group to danger. They may freeze initially, but then rely on their speed to escape. They can travel for short distances at 55 kilometres (34 mi) per hour as they run to the safety of one of their burrows. The young dive in headfirst, but the older animals reverse direction and back in so that they can defend themselves with their tusks. The juveniles become sexually mature at one to one and a half years, and life expectancy is 10 or more years.

== Research ==
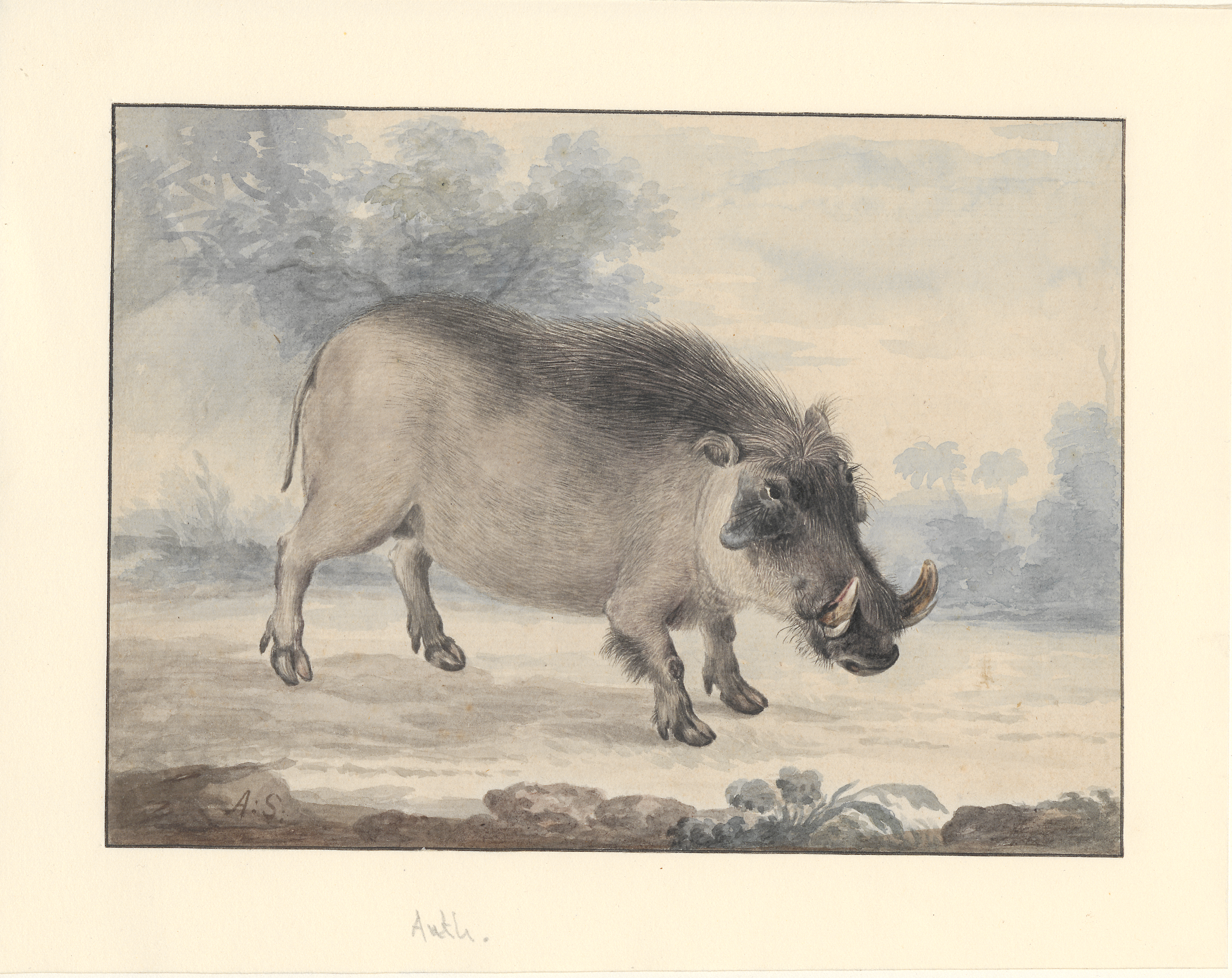
The extinct Cape warthog depicted in an 18th century print.

Desert warthogs were experimentally infected with the virus that causes African swine fever. The warthogs showed no external signs of the infection, but they remained infective to domestic pigs for at least 33 days, when the experiment terminated. To reduce the risk of their animals being infected with this disease, farmers used to shoot desert warthogs. The disease was found to be actually transmitted by the tick Ornithodoros moubata, so elimination of warthogs to try to protect domestic swine serves no useful purpose.

The desert warthog is an important host of the tsetse fly, and in some parts of its range efforts are being made to reduce warthog numbers because of this. Specifically, P. aethiopicus was the preferred host for Glossina swynnertoni and G. pallidipes in a study by Weitz 1963. These resulted in variously 16% or 12% (depending on sample) of P. aethiopicus infected with trypanosomes. The trypanosomes found included Trypanosoma brucei by Geigy et al 1967 and T. congolense by Baker 1968. In cases of peracute infection, Ashcroft 1959 and Geigy found P. aethiopicus to be suffering widespread haemorrhaging of serous membranes of their vital organs, hepatomegaly, splenomegaly, lymphadenopathy, and body fat atrophy. Torr 1994 found that the presence of P. aethiopicus may be more or less of a problem, depending on whether their associated Glossina can be controlled, which varies widely with the availability of specific attractants.

Warthogs are prolific breeders, and research is being performed into their breeding and recruitment patterns as a means of deciding how best to control them.

== Status ==
In its Red List of Endangered Species, the International Union for Conservation of Nature lists the desert warthog as being of "least concern", because it is common in some parts of its range and the population is thought to be stable. It occurs in a number of national parks and wildlife sanctuaries, and it faces no significant threats, although it may locally be hunted for bushmeat. It also faces competition at waterholes and for grazing with domestic livestock.
