= David Wickins =

English businessman

- Born: 15 February 1920; Tilehurst, Berkshire, England
- Died: 28 January 2007 (aged 86); Mallorca, Spain
- Education: St George's College, Weybridge
- Occupation: Businessman
- Known for: founding British Car Auctions
- Children: 6

David Allen Wickins (15 February 1920 – 28 January 2007) was an English accountant-turned-entrepreneur, best known for founding the vehicle remarketing business British Car Auctions, and saving Lotus Cars.

== Early life ==
David Allen Wickins was born in Tilehurst, near Reading, Berkshire on 15 February 1920. The seventh child of an architect-turned-builder who was 64 when David was born, his father was one of the first civilian casualties killed in London at the start of the Luftwaffe air raids during the Second World War.

His mother was a successful antiques dealer, enabling him to be educated at St George's College, Weybridge, by Josephites. Wickins described his schooling as "very academic, very hard", though an aptitude for figures allowed him to run a betting book for fellow pupils.

== Early career ==
On leaving school he was recommended to apply to take articles with accountants Deloitte & Co in London. On gaining his chartered membership, he volunteered to be posted to Cape Town, South Africa, working on financial audits for Rhodesian copper mines and Zambian sawmills.

== Second World War ==
At the start of the Second World War, due to the death of his father he decided to avoid the heavy conflict in Europe and joined the South African Navy. Seconded to the Royal Navy after 18 months, he reluctantly returned to England. Serving as a lieutenant in motor torpedo boats based in East Anglia patrolling the North Sea, he served alongside both Edward du Cann (later a Conservative politician) and Owen Aisher (later a noted yachtsman/entrepreneur).

== British Car Auctions ==
In 1946 and still a Royal Navy officer, Wickins was offered a commission in the South African Navy, with immediate deployment on their duties in managing the reconstruction of Japan.

Deciding to take the offer, he needed to sell his Riley Lynx tourer. Placing an advert in the local newspaper, he offered to sell the car to the first person who turned up at his mother's house with £200. Arriving home late, he found a crowd of eager buyers, and so auctioned the car off for £420.

Wickins then rented a farmer's field at Frimley Bridges, now under junction 4 of the M3 motorway, and set up his first public auction. The 14 cars auctioned sold for a total of £8,250. Wickins and one of his brothers immediately founded Southern Counties Car Auctions Ltd, which after exiting the Royal Navy shortly afterwards he expanded across the UK by selling surplus ex-British Army and Royal Air Force vehicles for the Ministry of Defence.

Wickins then expanded the company across Europe and the United States through acquisition. This included, in the late 1970s, the purchase of the car auctions division of British conglomerate Hawley Goodall, owned by Michael Ashcroft, Baron Ashcroft. This proved to be the start of a lifelong friendship between Wickins and Ashcroft, and through his Bermuda and Belize based holdings in various banks, Ashcroft would finance a number of Wickins later ventures. In 1987, Ashcroft bought out the existing shareholders of BCA via Hawley Goodall, and closed down Wickins treasured aviation division, which flew both Jet Ranger helicopters and Beechcraft King Air turbo prop aircraft.

The company initially had offices at the Frimley Bridges site, but later moved to purpose-built premises at Blackbushe Airport, Yateley, where the aviation division was based. Employing 160 at its head office, Wickins had built the company into the largest car auction business in the world by the time of his retirement in 1990.

Today, still based at Blackbushe but owned by an investment banking division of HSBC, BCA claims to be Europe's largest vehicle auctioning company, employing 5,000 people, and selling 1.3 million vehicles that generate a turnover of £3.3billion.

== Other ventures ==
After British Leyland decided to close the MG Cars factory at Abingdon in 1980, Wickins became involved with a group of businessmen aiming to finance Aston Martin's purchase of the brand and factory. Led by Alan Curtis (Chairman of Aston Martin), the group consisted of Wickins, Peter Cadbury, Lord George-Brown and the Norwest construction. The consortia commissioned William Towns to design an updated MG MGB, which was produced at Newport Pagnell in six days, ready for the publicity presentation. However, rejected outright by BL, this project failed to materialise.

After the death of founder Colin Chapman in 1982, Wickins became involved with Lotus Cars in 1983, taking a 29% stake in the then troubled company. After bringing in other investors and negotiating with the Inland Revenue, he oversaw a turnaround in the sports car manufacturer's fortunes, which resulted in him being called "The saviour of Lotus". Wickins oversaw the sale of the business to General Motors in 1986.

In March 1983, Wickins was asked to lead a private-sector consortia to help save the Meriden Workers Co-operative. The co-op owned the Triumph Engineering company, the stuttering residual and by then near-bankrupt component of the once world dominant British motorcycling industry, by then solely producing the Triumph Bonneville T140. Wickins gathered a £500,000 private investment fund together from five investors, including BCA, United Dominions Trust and GEC/Binatone. But civil servants, with advising merchant bankers and commercial accountants, considered that at least £1 million was required to save the company and reconstruct it. Despite briefly considering buying the bankrupt Hesketh Motorcycles, and touting a 900cc prototype water-cooled twin at the 1983 National Exhibition Show to attract outside investment, the Conservative-led UK government refused to back the co-op, resulting in Triumph Motorcycles (Meriden) Ltd becoming bankrupt on 23 August 1983.

By early 1983, Lord Ashcroft's Hawley Goodall Ltd had built up a 20% stake in pharmaceutical packaging manufacturer Cope Allman. Ashcroft offered to increase his stake to 29.9%, just below the 30% level at which a formal bid for the entire company must be launched. Ashcroft and Cope Allman fought bitterly over the purchase share price and current holdings, with Cope Allman reporting Ashcroft and Wickins to the Takeover panel, after discovering that BCA had built up a 13.5% in the company. But the takeover panel found that the Ashcroft and Wickins were operating independently, so Hawley was able to increase its holding to 29.9%. At this point the combined holdings of Hawley/BCA in Cope Allman amounted to 43.5%, giving them the power to introduce sweeping changes without launching a full bid. Cope Allman was eventually sold to an MBO backed by Hawley and financed by Bain Capital, and then sold to Bowater in 1992 in a complex swap of assets with ADT/Hawley.

In 1985 Ashcroft and Wickins bought car sales dealership Henlys Group via a Canadian-registered company. Controlled by Ashcroft's Hawley Goodall, Henlys was merged with funeral hearse makers Coleman Milne to form a Motoring Division. In 1989, Hawley Goodall sold its Motoring Division consisting of Henlys and Coleman Milne to the Plaxton Group, the bus and coach manufacturer based in Scarborough, North Yorkshire.

Wickins became involved with Charles Forte, Baron Forte, joining the board of Forte Group to enable the family to sell-off the catering and restaurant business to concentrate on their hotel business.

In the 1970s, Wickins bought "The Mariners" public house in Frensham, in an ill-fated attempt to turn it into a high-class restaurant. It was one of his many business ventures, not all of which succeeded, he commenting later that his motto was: "If you don't bet on a few losers, you'll never bet on a winner."

== Sports ==
Wickins learnt to ride in his 40s, and founded the Priory Equestrian Centre at Frensham. Through this he became involved in horse racing as both a breeder and owner, later sponsoring champion National Hunt racing jockey Bob Champion.

A near-scratch golfer, Wickins sponsored Nick Faldo. Through golf and his long association with the Conservative Party, he met and befriended Denis Thatcher. Wickins later agreed to sponsor Mark Thatcher's motor racing activities through BCA. Denis later served on one of Wickins companies boards, while Mark Thatcher served as chairman of Lotus Cars in North America.

In 1989, the year of his retirement from BCA, the company sponsored the ladies tennis competition the Wightman Cup in his honour, the last time that it was played. As a result, Prime Minister Margaret Thatcher threw a party at 10 Downing Street.

== Personal life ==
Wickins was married at least five, possibly six times. He had been married at least once and possibly twice before he left South Africa. On leaving the Royal Navy he married Diana Gordon, with whom he had his first two children. His subsequent two marriages bore one daughter, with his final marriage to Karen Young in 1969 enduring the rest of his life, and bringing the couple three daughters.

Having lived at 99 Park Lane in London during his business career, the former home of the Sheriff of London Sir Moses Montefiore (1784/1885), Wickins died at his home in Mallorca, Spain aged 86, on 28 January 2007.
