= Moben =

Moben may refer to:

- Maurice Benayoun, contemporary new media artist (a.k.a. MoBen or Mo Ben. In Chinese：莫奔, that could be translated by: the one who "doesn't run")
- Moben Kitchens, a defunct kitchen fittings and design retailer
