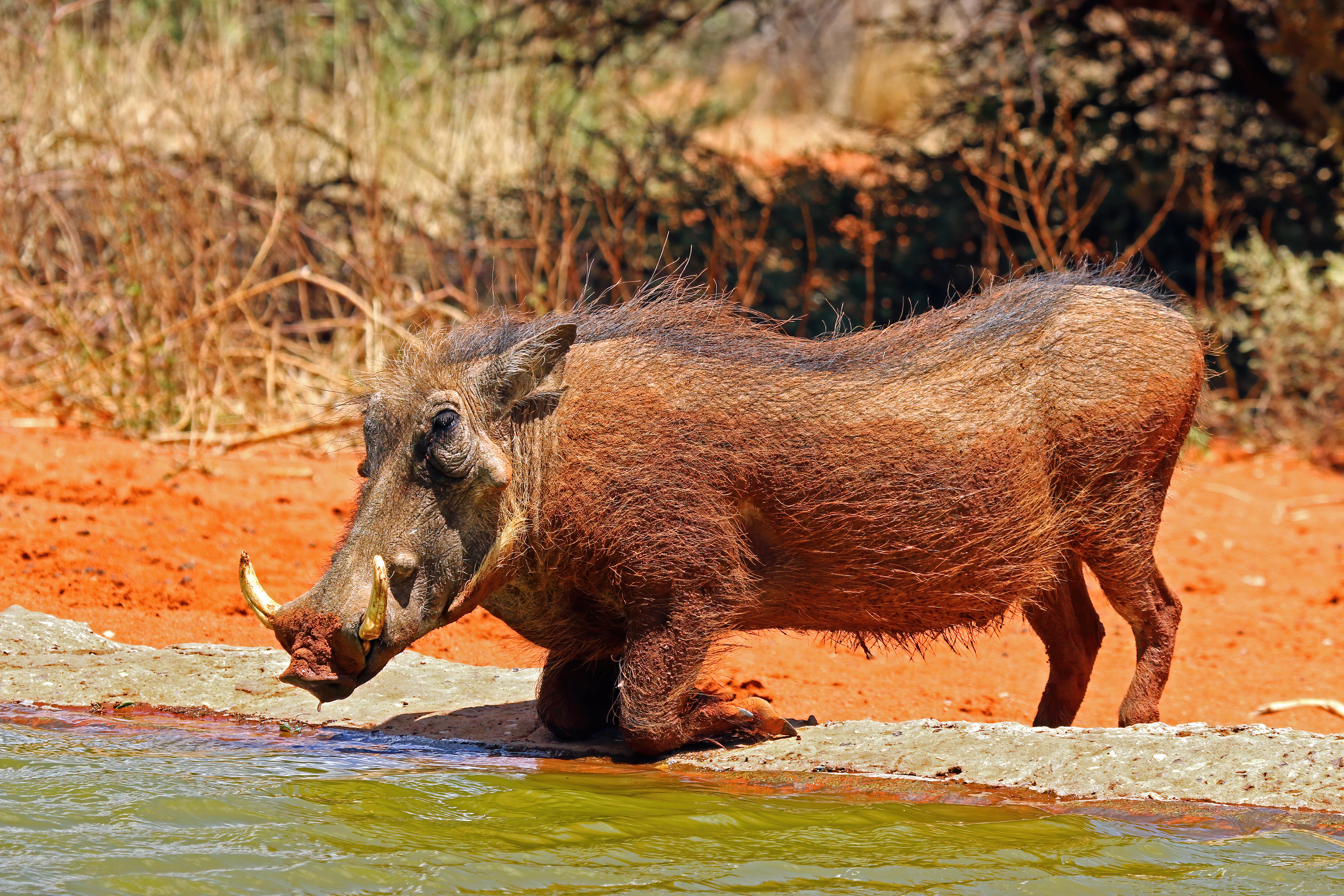
- Male common warthog Phacochoerus africanus Tswalu Kalahari Reserve, South Africa

Scientific classification
- Kingdom: Animalia
- Phylum: Chordata
- Class: Mammalia
- Order: Artiodactyla
- Family: Suidae
- Tribe: Phacochoerini
- Genus: Phacochoerus; F. Cuvier, 1826

Type species
- Aper aethiopicus Pallas, 1766

Species
- Phacochoerus aethiopicus Phacochoerus africanus

Synonyms
- Aper Pallas, 1766, nom. rej.; Dinochoerus Gloger, 1841; Eureodon G. Fischer von Waldheim, 1817; Macrocephalus Frisch, 1775; Macrocephalus Palmer, 1904; Phacellochaerus Hemprich & Ehrenberg, 1832; Phacellochoerus Hemprich & Ehrenberg, 1832; Phacochaeres Gray, 1821; Phacocherus Fleming, 1822; Phacochoerus G. Cuvier, 1816; Phascochaeres Cretzschmar, 1828; Phascochaerus Desmarest, 1822; Phascochoeres Ranzani, 1821; Phascochoerus Ranzani, 1821

= Warthog =

Genus of wild pigs

Phacochoerus is a genus in the family Suidae, commonly known as warthogs (/ˈwɔːrtˌhɒɡ/ WORT-hog). They are pigs which live in open and semi-open habitats, even in quite arid regions, in sub-Saharan Africa. The two species were formerly considered conspecific under the scientific name Phacochoerus aethiopicus, but today this is limited to the desert warthog, while the best-known and most widespread species, the common warthog (or simply warthog), is Phacochoerus africanus.

== Description ==
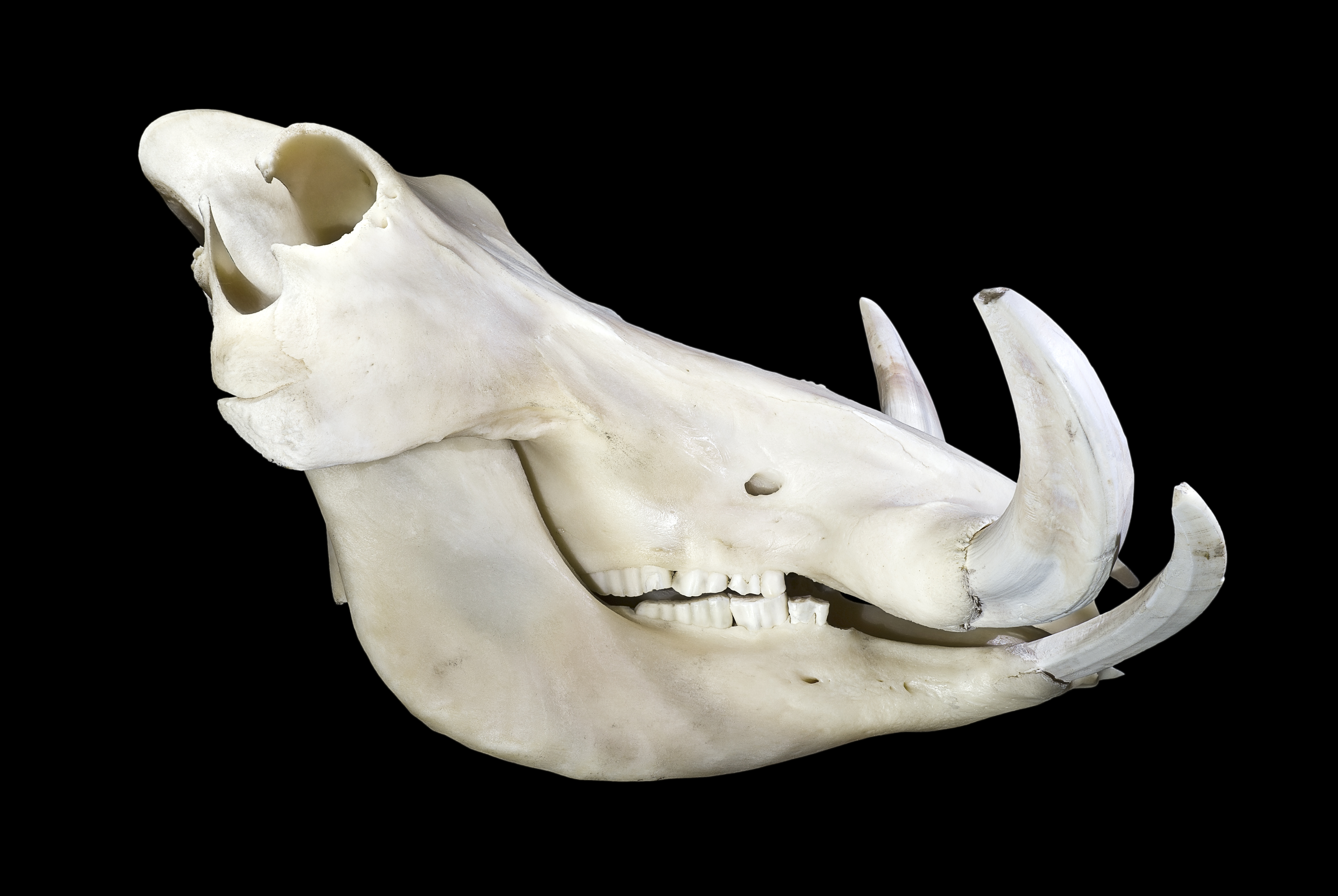
Skull

Although covered in bristly hairs, a warthog's body and head appear largely bare, from a distance, with only a crest of hair along the back and the tufts on the face and tail being obvious. The English name "wart" in warthog refers to their facial wattles, which are particularly distinct in males. The males also have very prominent tusks, which reach a length of 25 to 65 centimetres (9.8 to 25.6 inches); females' tusks are always smaller. They are largely herbivorous, but, like most suids, opportunistically eat invertebrates or small animals, even scavenging on carrion. While both species remain fairly common and widespread, and considered to be of Least Concern by the IUCN, the nominate subspecies of desert warthog, commonly known as the Cape warthog (P. a. aethiopicus) was extinct by around 1865.

== Species ==
The genus Phacochoerus contains two species. The two species emerged from ecological barriers. The two species differ in dentition; P. africanus lacks upper incisors, while P. aethiopicus has a full set; and also in the shape of the head, notably the largest facial warts, straight conical in P. africanus, and downcurved or hooked in P. aethiopicus.

Genus Phacochoerus – F. Cuvier, 1826 – two species
| Common name | Scientific name and subspecies | Range | Size and ecology | IUCN status and estimated population |
|---|---|---|---|---|
| Common warthog | Phacochoerus africanus (Gmelin, 1788) Four subspecies: Nolan (northern) warthog (P. a. africanus) Gmelin, 1788; Eritrean warthog (P. a. aeliani) Cretzschmar, 1828; Central African warthog (P. a. massaicus) Lönnberg, 1908; Southern warthog (P. a. sundevallii) Lönnberg, 1908 | Widespread in the savannah of Sub-Saharan Africa from Senegal to Ethiopia down to South Africa, absent from heavily forested or desert areas. | Size: A head-and-body length ranging from 0.9 to 1.5 m (2 ft 11 in to 4 ft 11 in), and shoulder height from 63.5 to 85 cm (25.0 to 33.5 in). Females, at 45 to 75 kg (99 to 165 lb), are smaller and lighter than males, at 60 to 150 kg (130 to 330 lb). Habitat: Diet: | LC |
| Desert warthog | Phacochoerus aethiopicus (Pallas, 1766) Two subspecies: †P. a. aethiopicus (Pallas, 1766); P. a. delamerei Lönnberg, 1909 | Northern Kenya and Somalia, and possibly Djibouti, Eritrea, and Ethiopia. | Size: Average length of 125 centimetres (49 in) and weight of 75 kilograms (165 lb) with males being larger than females. Habitat: Diet: | LC |
