= Avril Palmer-Baunack =

British businesswoman

- Born: April 1964 (age 61)
- Occupation: Businesswoman
- Title: CEO, British Car Auctions

Avril Palmer-Baunack (born April 1964) is the chief executive of British Car Auctions, which auctions around 750,000 used cars in the United Kingdom every year. She is the former chairman of Stobart Group.
