= HomeForm Group =

Former furniture retailer based in Northern England

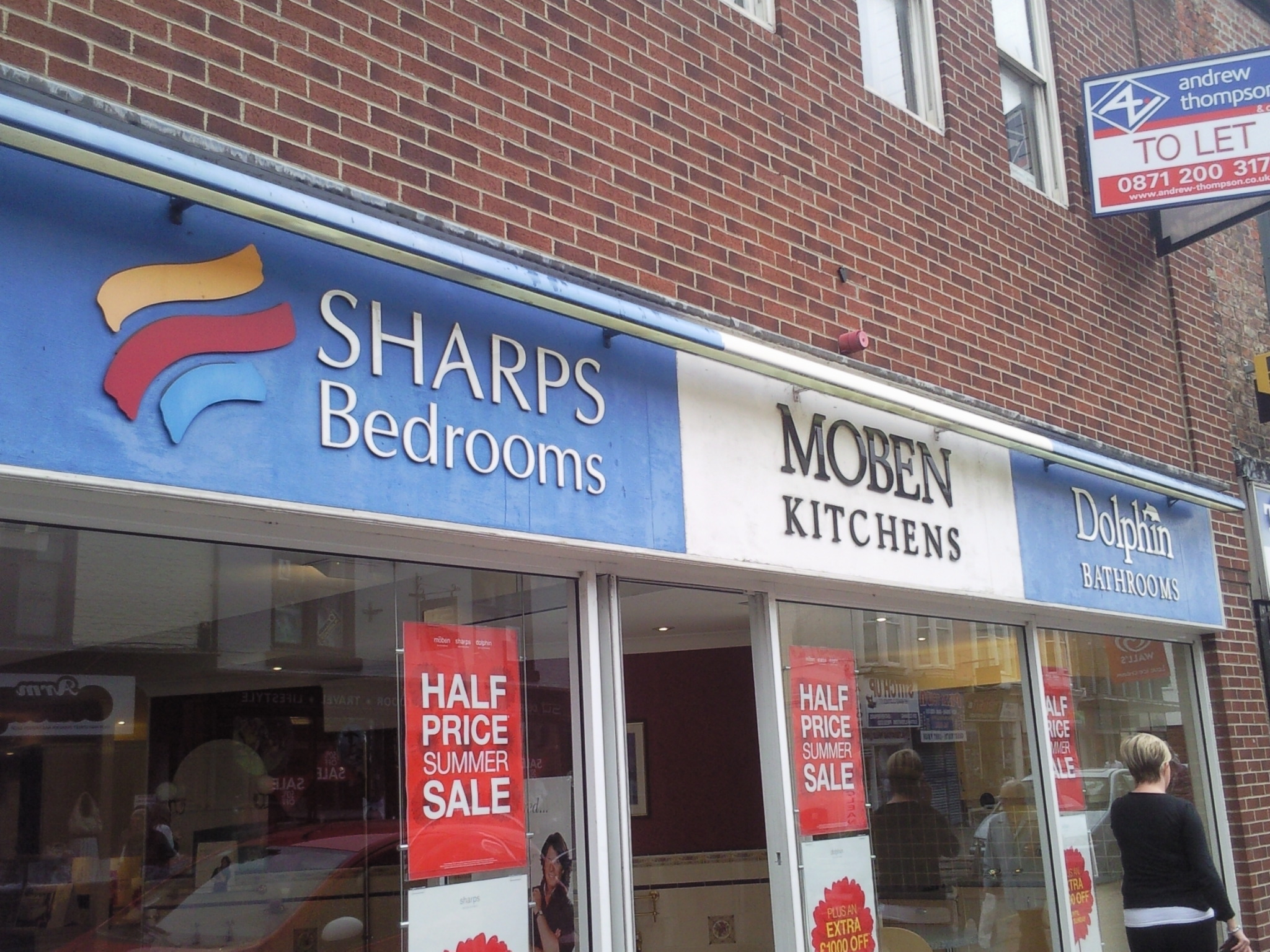
- Type: Public
- Industry: Retail
- Founded: August 2000
- Defunct: June 2011
- Fate: Administration
- Headquarters: Cornbrook, Manchester, United Kingdom
- Products: Kitchens; Bathrooms; Bedrooms
- Number of employees: 1,800 (2011)

Founded in 2000, the HomeForm Group was one of the largest retailers of fitted home improvement products in the United Kingdom. The head office was in Cornbrook, Manchester. HomeForm operated several brands, namely Möben Kitchens, Sharps Bedrooms, Dolphin Bathrooms and Kitchens Direct.

== History ==
Dolphin Showers was formed in the 1960s by Geoffrey Farmiloe, and was purchased in 1978 by the double glazing group run by James Gulliver; Alpine.

Sharps Bedroom Design was established in the 1970s in Leicester as a custom bedroom furniture manufacturer and installer. The company was purchased by Michael Ashcroft's group; Hawley Leisure in 1979. Hawley merged Sharps with the newly-acquired Kean and Scott in 1980.

The combination of the names of Len Morris and Jim Bentham gave Moben Kitchens its name upon foundation in 1976. Morris and Benson had previously founded double glazing firm, Cold Shield Windows, in 1967 before selling it to Doulton Glass in 1971. Moben was built on a model of forceful direct advertising, a tool employed by Morris and Bentham at Cold Shield, with campaigns led by the same advertising executive they had used then; Morrie Tabak, now employed in the Manchester office of Saatchi & Saatchi. Moben was taken over in July 1979 by Kitchen Queen, a company founded by Neville Johnson in 1965. After Kitchen Queen hit financial difficulties in the recession of 1980, Morris and Bentham took over as Chairman and Managing Director respectively, selling Kitchen Queen to Stephen Boler. Moben bought Cold Shield back in 1982, acquiring Mullberry Home Extensions and Wallguard, a damp treatment company, in the process. Bentham left in December 1983 due to ill-health and later founded a fitted bathroom company.

Stephen Boler placed Kitchen Queen into receivership in February 1982 and quickly established a new venture; Kitchens Direct.

Kean and Scott purchased Alpine Holdings from Gulliver in April 1983, Kitchens Direct in April 1984 and Moben Group in October 1984.

The merged group had a number of underperforming businesses and by December 1984, Kean and Scott had put former Moben group companies; Cold Shield Windows and Mulberry Home Improvements into the hands of the receivers, with Len Morris walking away from the companies he'd led on and off since 1967. A rearrangement of Michael Ashcroft's companies saw Kean and Scott come under the control of Henlys Group in 1987 and renamed Home Improvement Holdings in 1989. This proved not to be the last ownership change of the 1980s for the group with the group being purchased by Stephen Boler in May 1989.

Boler renamed the business Limelight in 1991 and took the company public in a disastrous floatation in November 1996 which saw the firms value plunge from £175 million to £40 million by March 1998.

The company, by now comprising Sharps, Moben, Kitchens Direct, Dolphin and Portland Consevatories (which Boler had separately acquired), was taken private again in a management buyout in 2000 to become HomeForm Group. HomeForm went into a 'pre-pack' administration in April 2007 which saw the business purchased by US private equity firm; Sun Capital Partners.

HomeForm went into administration in June 2011. The Möben, Dolphin and Kitchens Direct businesses were subsequently closed down, and Sharps Bedrooms was sold.

Prior to entering administration, the company had 160 showrooms across the UK and employed more than 1,300 showroom staff. Additionally, it employed more than 1,500 fitters and designers.
