= Sharps Bedrooms =

British Home furnishing retailer

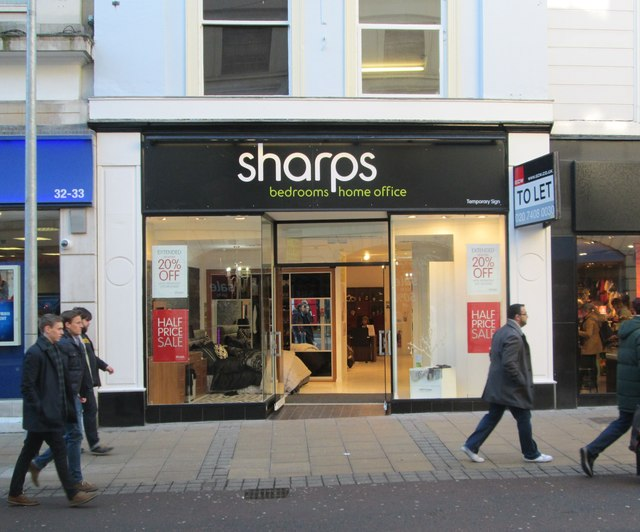
- A branch of Sharps Bedrooms in Leeds from December 2014
- Type: Private company
- Industry: Manufacturer; Retail
- Founded: 1973; 53 years ago
- Headquarters: Bilston, West Midlands, United Kingdom
- Key people: (Managing Director)
- Products: Fitted Bedroom; Home Office Furniture
- Owner: Epiris LLP
- Number of employees: 600
- Website: www.sharps.co.uk

Sharps Bedrooms is a British privately owned fitted bedroom and home office retailer and manufacturer. The company has 31 showrooms across the United Kingdom, with its factory and headquarters in Bilston, West Midlands.

== History ==
Sharps was established in the 1970s in Leicester as a custom bedroom furniture manufacturer and installer. The company was purchased by Michael Ashcroft's group; Hawley Leisure in 1979. Hawley merged Sharps with the newly-acquired Kean and Scott in 1980, a business which would go on to take over Dolphin Showers and Alpine Double Glazing owner Alpine Holdings from James Gulliver in April 1983, Kitchens Direct in April 1984 and Moben Group in October 1984.

The merged group had a number of underperforming businesses and by December 1984, Kean and Scott had put former Moben group companies; Cold Shield Windows and Mulberry Home Improvements into the hands of the receivers. A rearrangement of Michael Ashcroft's companies saw Kean and Scott come under the control of Henlys Group in 1987 and renamed Home Improvement Holdings in 1989. This proved not to be the last ownership change of the 1980s for the group with the group being purchased by Kitchens Direct founder Stephen Boler in May 1989.

Boler renamed the business Limelight in 1991 and took the company public in a disastrous floatation in November 1996 which saw the firms value plunge from £175 million to £40 million by March 1998.

The company, by now comprising Sharps, Moben, Kitchens Direct, Dolphin and Portland Consevatories (which Boler had separately acquired), was taken private again in a management buyout in 2000 to become HomeForm Group. HomeForm went into a 'pre-pack' administration in April 2007 which saw the business purchased by US private equity firm; Sun Capital Partners.

In June 2011, Homeform entered administration and Sharps was repurchased by Sun Capital Partners the following month. By June 2019, the company's annual turnover exceeded £100 million. In June 2021, Sharps Bedrooms was purchased by Epiris.

== Products ==
Sharps Bedrooms designs and manufactures fitted bedroom, living and home office furniture.

== Related companies ==
Sharps Bedrooms was a subsidiary of a private equity fund managed by Sun European Partners, the European arm of Sun Capital Partners, an American-based private investment firm. Since 2019, Sharps Bedrooms has been owned by Epiris, a private equity firm based in London.
