= Clicars =

Spanish used car company

- Type: Subsidiary
- Industry: Automotive, Ecommerce
- Founded: 2016
- Founders: Pablo Fernández, Carlos Rivera
- Headquarters: Madrid, Spain
- Key people: Alejandro Garcia Mella (CEO)
- Products: Reconditioned cars
- Parent: Aramis Group (Stellantis)
- Website: clicars.com

Clicars is a Spanish company that sells reconditioned cars. It was founded in 2016 and has been part of the Aramis Group, a subsidiary of Stellantis, since 2021. The company is among the 1,000 largest by revenue in Spain, with accumulated sales of more than €1.5 billion and over 85,000 cars sold.

Clicars specialises in reconditioned vehicles, which are second-hand cars without structural damage or major faults that have been certified under strict quality standards. Each car undergoes a process of inspection covering more than 320 points, including electronic diagnostics and dynamic testing, before being refurbished mechanically and cosmetically.

== History ==
Clicars was founded by Pablo Fernández and Carlos Rivera in 2016. The company was the first ecommerce platform dedicated to selling used cars in Spain. The company raised a €1 million seed round and generated more than €5 million in revenue in its first year.

In 2018, Clicars relocated its headquarters to Villaverde, Madrid, where it established a 40,000-square-metre site that became the largest car reconditioning plant in Europe. In 2025, the company opened a second reconditioning facility in Valencia, expanding its annual capacity to 30,000 vehicles.

Following an initial strategic alliance with Aramisauto.com in 2017, Clicars was acquired in 2021 by the Aramis Group. At the time of the acquisition, José Carlos del Valle was appointed chief executive officer of Clicars in Spain.

From 2023, the company began to expand nationally with the opening of physical sales points in Zaragoza, Valencia, Alicante, Córdoba and Málaga, in addition to its base in Madrid. In 2024, Clicars launched its first “Clicars Point” in Alicante, an experiential retail format that combines online sales with personalised consulting and interactive showrooms.

In 2025, Clicars introduced a new brand identity. The company promoted reconditioned cars as a “third category” of vehicle, positioned between new and used cars. In December, Aramis Group appointed Alejandro Garcia Mella as the CEO of Clicars.
