= Aramis Alvarez Pedraza =

Cuban chess grandmaster (born 1988)

Aramís Álvarez Pedraza
Personal information
- Born: July 27, 1988 (age 37) Santa Clara, Cuba

Chess career
- Country: Cuba
- Title: Grandmaster (2010)
- FIDE rating: 2433 (July 2026)
- Peak rating: 2565 (November 2011)

Aramís Álvarez Pedraza (born 1988) is a Cuban chess player who received the Grandmaster title in 2010.

== Results in competition ==
- 2001: Silver medal in the National School Games in the second board, in the category 13–14.
- 2003: Gold Medal in the 15–16 category.
- 2004: National youth runner-up.
- 2005: Champion place in the Cup April 9. Runner-up in the Marcelo Salado Cup and ESPA Cup.
- 2006: He made his debut in the Capablanca tournaments with a commendable ninth place among 50 contestants that earned him his first IM standard.
- 2007: He was the 14th of 24 players and obtained the second IM standard. At Capablanca he was 16th out of 84 players and achieved his third and final IM standard.
- 2008: He played six tournaments with a gold medal, two silver, and fourth place. Runner-up in the Oviedo Open where he achieved his first GM standard for players under 27. He defended Club Escacs Lleida in the Spanish Tournament for teams in the First Division, and his contribution of 5½ points with a performance of more than 2600 Elo contributed to the second collective position. He was champion of the Oviedo Open, obtaining his first rule.
- 2009: He was champion at the Cuenca Open. Third, in the La Roda International Tournament, obtaining his second GM standard.
- 2010: He was champion of the XXXIII Open International City of San Sebastian, obtaining his third and final GM standard.
- 2011: He defended the first board of Club Escacs Lleida in the Catalan League with an excellent performance of 2680 ELO. Invited at the last minute to the Premier group of the Capablanca Tournament, he was third and best Cuban. He was third in the VIII Catalan Circuit thanks to the sub - championship of the Open City of Balaguer and to the third positions in the open ones of Figueres, Pobla de Lillet, and Sants. He won the Open of the National University of Colombia and finished in third place in the Open of Panama.
