= Glossina pallidipes =

Scientific classification
- Kingdom: Animalia
- Phylum: Arthropoda
- Clade: Pancrustacea
- Class: Insecta
- Order: Diptera
- Family: Glossinidae
- Genus: Glossina
- Species: G. pallidipes

Binomial name
- Glossina pallidipes Austen, 1903
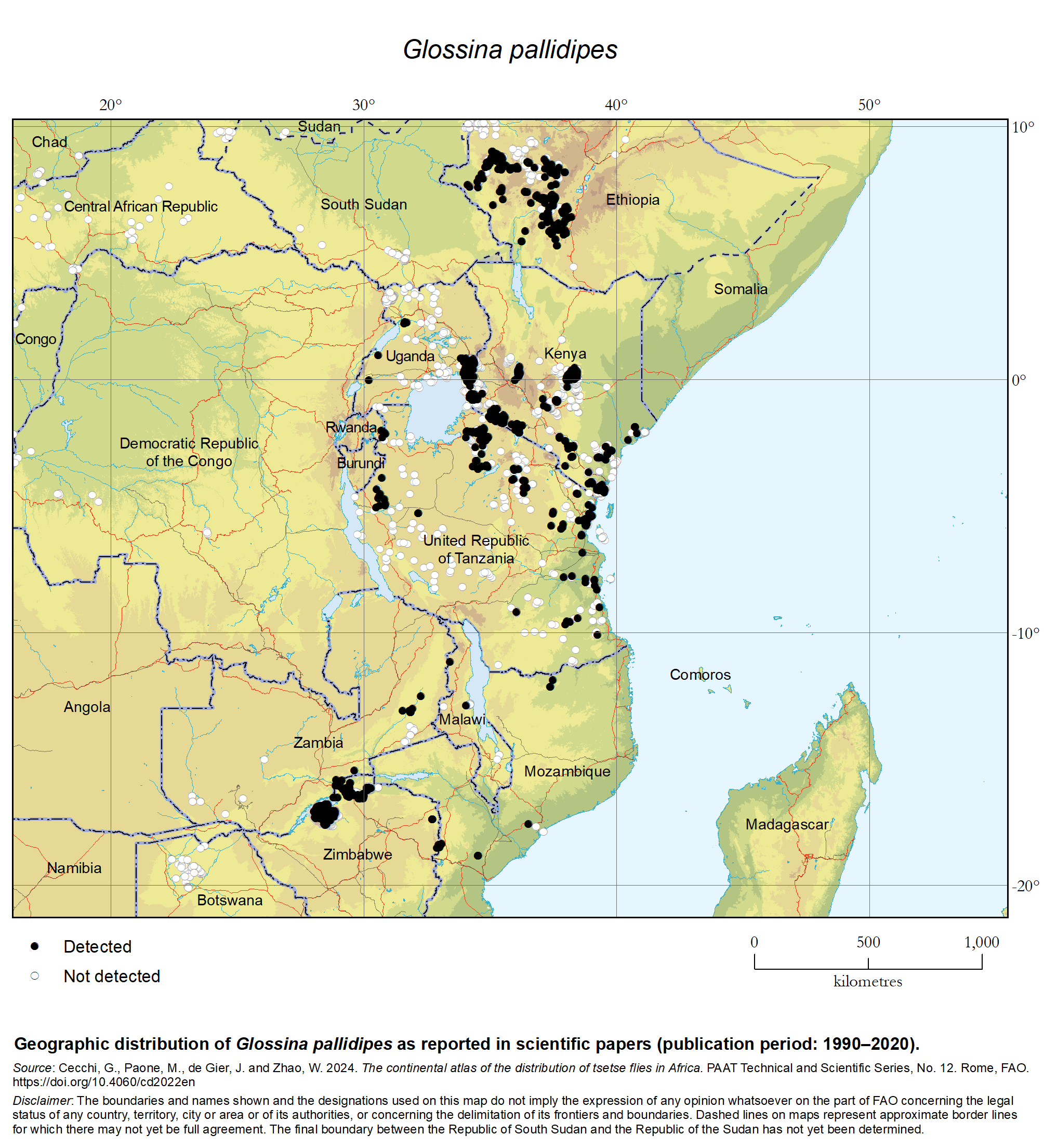
- Geographic distribution of Glossina pallidipes as reported in scientific papers – Publication period 1990–2020

Species of tsetse fly

Glossina pallidipes is one of the 23 recognized species of tsetse flies (genus Glossina), and it belongs to the savannah/morsitans group (subgenus Glossina s.s.). Glossina pallidipes is a major vector of African trypanosomiasis, both for the human and the animal form of the disease.

== Distribution ==
Glossina pallidipes was known to be patchily distributed across East Africa, from Ethiopia to Mozambique. A review of the peer-reviewed scientific literature for the period 1990–2020 revealed that there is abundant data on the occurrence of G. pallidipes, with over 200 papers published. The data indicate that the species presently infests 9 countries: Ethiopia, Kenya, Malawi, Mozambique, Rwanda, Uganda, the United Republic of Tanzania, Zambia and Zimbabwe.
