= Constellation Automotive Group =

Used vehicle marketplace

- Type: Vehicle remarketing and logistics
- Industry: Automotive
- Founded: 1946: as Southern Counties Car Auctions; October 2020: Constellation Automotive Group
- Founder: David Wickins
- Headquarters: Bedford, England
- Key people: Avril Palmer-Baunack (executive chairman); Tim Lampert (CFO)
- Products: Physical and online vehicle auctions
- Owner: TDR Capital
- Subsidiaries: BCA; CarNext; cinch; elmo; The Car Buying Group (acquired through purchase of Aston Barclay); Marshall Motor Group; We Buy Any Car
- Website: www.constellationautomotive.com

Constellation Automotive Group is a used vehicle marketplace. It was founded in the United Kingdom in 1946, as Southern Counties Car Auctions, and was a publicly traded company, BCA Marketplace, when acquired and taken private by TDR Capital in November 2019. TDR rebranded it to the current name in October 2020.

== History ==
In 1946, Royal Navy officer David Wickins decided to sell his Riley Lynx tourer. Placing an advert in the local newspaper, he offered to sell the car to the first person who turned up at his mother's house in Farnham, Surrey with £200. Arriving home late, he found a crowd of eager buyers, and so auctioned the car off for £420.

Wickins then rented a farmer's field at Frimley Bridges, now under junction 4 of the M3 motorway on the A331 by Hawley Road in Frimley, Surrey, and set up his first public auction. The 14 cars sold for a total of £8,250. Wickins and one of his brothers immediately founded Southern Counties Car Auctions, which, when he left the Royal Navy soon after, he expanded across the UK by selling surplus ex-British Army and Royal Air Force vehicles for the Ministry of Defence.

Wickins renamed the company British Car Auctions, and expanded it across Europe and the United States through acquisition. This included the purchase of the car auctions division of British conglomerate Hawley Goodall, owned by Michael Ashcroft, which started a lifelong friendship between them. Ashcroft, through his Bermuda and Belize based holdings in various banks, financed a number of Wickins' later business ventures.

The company had head offices at the Frimley Bridges site, but later moved to purpose-built premises at Blackbushe Airport, Yateley to accommodate the now-closed aviation division. It still occupies the site. Employing 160 at its head office, Wickins built the company into the largest car auction business in the world before retiring in 1990. A near-scratch golfer, through this and his long association with the Conservative Party, Wickins met and befriended Denis Thatcher. Wickins later agreed to sponsor Mark Thatcher's motor racing activities in the 1980s through BCA. Denis Thatcher later served on one of Wickins' company boards, while Mark Thatcher served as chairman of Lotus Cars and later BCA in North America, which Wickins had led from near-bankruptcy to survival.

In the late 1980s, Belize-based Hawley Goodall undertook a reverse takeover of ADT Security Services, and renamed itself ADT. Focusing on security systems, ADT sold the North American and European arms of BCA in separate deals. While the residual North American arm was broken-up and sold to trade buyers, the European arm was acquired by a consortium of some 40 private investors, including Lord Ashcroft via his Belize-based investment company, in 1995. In September 2006, the European arm was bought by the investment banking arm of private bank Samuel Montagu & Co., a division of HSBC.

In February 2010, BCA was acquired by the private equity investment firm Clayton, Dubilier & Rice. In March 2015 Haversham Holdings, an investment business, undertook a reverse takeover of BCA and renamed itself BCA Marketplace.

In July 2019, the company launched cinch, an online used-car marketplace aimed at the consumer market. The cinch marketplace has been the major sponsor of the Scottish Premiership, Scotland's top football-division, since the 2021-2022 season, also acquiring naming rights.

The company was acquired by TDR Capital in November 2019, and was renamed Constellation Automotive Group in October 2020.

In December 2021, details of the £323 million purchase of the Marshall Motor Group were announced, although completion was delayed until May 2022 due to a regulatory review by Financial Conduct Authority.

Following Cazoo's May 2024 collapse, Constellation acquired some Cazoo assets.

In April 2025, the company announced that it would acquire Aston Barclay and its subsidiary, The Car Buying Group. Following the announcement, the UK's Competition and Markets Authority (CMA) launched an investigation into the merger, issuing an enforcement order that required the two companies to operate independently during the review. The CMA officially cleared the acquisition in March 2026. By July 2026, the integration process was completed, and all former Aston Barclay auction sites were rebranded under the BCA name.

== Operations ==
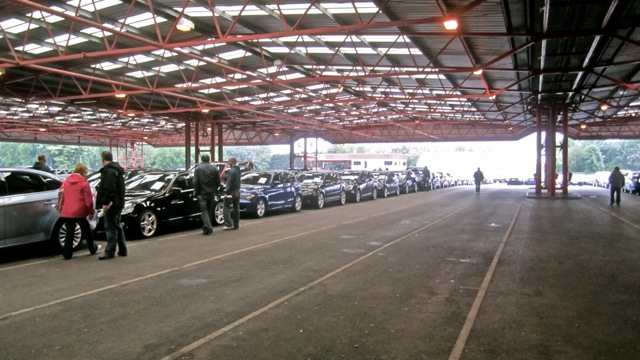
BCA Belle Vue, Manchester

The company operates the largest vehicle auction site in Europe and auctions over 50% of all cars sold by auction in the UK.
