= Henlys Group =

Henlys Group PLC was a major London motor distributor and dealer founded in 1917 in London's Great Portland Street. In the 1980s it was taken over by a company associated with Michael Ashcroft, then some years later sold to Yorkshire bus manufacturer Plaxton.

Long-established Plaxton took the Henlys name in March 1992, sold the motor business in 1997 and with the freed capital became a major player in the bus and coach business in North America.

Henlys Group, previously known as Plaxton, found it was unable to service the debt taken on for its North American expansion, liquidated what it could and closed its business in 2004.

== Henlys Limited ==
Frank Hough (1888-1935) —who also had his own motor business in Walsall which he had started in 1909— and Herbert Gerald Henly (1891-1973) began business in 1917 as car dealers at 89 Great Portland Street, London. When their private company was listed on the London Stock Exchange in 1928 they claimed to have one of the largest retail motor organisations in the country. It carried on business in London and Manchester dealing in "new and second hand cars of all descriptions". Showrooms and petrol stations gave the Henlys name to Henlys Corner, the junction of the North Circular Road, A1 and Finchley Road in Hampstead Garden Suburb and to Henlys Roundabout at the start of the A30 ( at the A4 ) at Hounslow West / Cranford. The business's scale may be gauged by the chairman's catalogue of their wartime activities given to shareholders in January 1946: assembly of 25,000 army vehicles of all types, repairs and maintenance of all types of service vehicles. In addition providing nearly 250,000 tank and aircraft assemblies and parts, repair or dismantling of 1,000 aircraft, handling over 80,000 tanks and packing more than a million spare parts. In 1946 Henlys distributed Armstrong Siddeley, Austin, Bentley, Jaguar, Riley, Rolls-Royce and Rover cars along with Studebaker vehicles for the whole of England and those of the Willys Overland Corporation including their famous Jeep. When Herbert Henly died in 1973 a brief obituary in The Times reported the business he had helped found ran 110 petrol stations, works departments and showrooms throughout Britain.

Henlys expanded by natural growth and by acquisition of major competitors. By 1981 car sales and profits were down. Aside from the British Leyland brands Henlys distributed Ford, Renault and Talbot. By 1984 takeover bids were in the air. In August 1984 Michael Ashcroft's Midepsa subsidiary, Coleman Milne, reported it held 59.8 per cent of Henly's shares.

== Plaxton Group ==
Henlys was bought by the Lord Ashcroft-backed Hawley Goodall, owners of Coleman Milne, the makers of funeral hearses. The bid was made via a Canadian-based company part-owned by David Wickins of British Car Auctions. On completion of the takeover, Hawley Goodall formed a Motoring Division comprising Henlys and Coleman Milne. In 1989, Hawley Goodall sold its Motoring Division consisting of Henlys and Coleman Milne to the Plaxton Group, the bus and coach manufacturer based in Scarborough, North Yorkshire. In May 1992, the Plaxton Group PLC was renamed Henlys Group PLC. Coleman Milne was sold to a management buy-out in late 1992.

== Henlys Group plc ==
Henlys pursued a strategy of diversification and expansion through the 1990s. The established Wigan bus bodybuilder Northern Counties was bought in 1995 for £10 million. The UK bus and coach manufacturing business, trading under the Plaxton brand, continued to produce a range of bus and coach bodywork. It also owned one of the largest UK coach dealers, Kirkby, and provided after-sales services to coach and bus operators.

=== North America ===
Henlys acquired a 49 percent share in Prévost, a leading North American manufacturer of coaches and bus shells in 1995. The other 51 percent of Prévost was owned by Volvo.

Car dealerships produced less than one fifth of Henlys' 1996 profits. The motor division, with 32 dealerships covering most major manufacturers, was sold in August 1997 to HMG, formed for the purpose by venture capitalist Legal and General Ventures. The motor division merged with Hancock Motors of Sevenoaks but HMG Holdings entered administration in February 2001. At that time HMG operated 38 sites represented 12 manufacturers and employed 1,800 to 2,000 people.

Most of Henlys' substantial net cash surplus went to pay for Canada's Nova Bus Corporation. The Nova Bus deal was reported just before Christmas 1997.

In February 1998, Prévost acquired Nova Bus, a city bus manufacturer for the Canadian and US market.

=== Dennis ===
In July 1998 Henlys made an agreed (with Dennis) bid of £190 million for bus and utility vehicle maker Dennis. A hostile bidding war ensued with engineering group Mayflower, owners of Scottish bus builder Walter Alexander. Volvo lent its support to the Henlys bid, which was raised to £247 million, but the Dennis board ultimately accepted Mayflower's £268.9 million offer.

The next year Henlys announced they were planning to spend up to £100 million on acquisitions, the money intended to be spent on the acquisition of Dennis, in order to expand its bus building activities in the US. After discussions with several companies, Henlys purchased Blue Bird, the US school bus manufacturer, for £267 million. This prompted speculation that Volvo might bid for Henlys. Henlys raised £111 million in a rights issue in order to fund the acquisition.

=== TransBus International ===
In August 2000, with continuing domestic sales difficulties, a joint venture was formed with Mayflower, now owners of the Dennis and Alexander brands. The joint venture, known as TransBus International, included only the United Kingdom bus manufacturing operations, including Plaxton and Northern Counties. Henlys held a 30 percent stake in the joint venture, which employed 3,300 employees at seven locations. The traditional brands of Alexander, Dennis and Plaxton were replaced by TransBus International.

TransBus International went into administration on 31 March 2004. TransBus Plaxton (Henlys) was sold to its managers, Brian Davidson and Mike Keane with the support of a private equity group. (Note: TransBus Dennis and TransBus Alexander were bought by a consortium which included —in a private capacity— Brian Souter and Ann Gloag, shareholders of Stagecoach Group.(Mayflower chiefs 'may be liable for pension hole'. The Times, Saturday, 22 May 2004; pg. 54; Issue 68082) The consortium named the combined business Alexander Dennis. Alexander Dennis rescued Plaxton in 2007.)

Henlys hoped to preserve their North American operations which had strong order books. However, servicing debt had placed too heavy a burden on those businesses. The North American operations were restructured, including closure of the Nova Bus factory in Roswell, New Mexico.

== Liquidation ==
In May 2004 a new chairman, David James, was appointed to help rescue Henlys. In June 2004 it was announced that a restructuring of Henlys would leave the shares with little or no value, and that Henlys' problems were caused by paying too high a price for the Blue Bird business in 1999. Henlys' shares were delisted from the Stock Exchange.

In October 2004 the Blue Bird operations were restructured with Volvo and creditor banks taking over the Henlys share. Volvo also took over the Prevost and Nova Bus operations.

Henlys Group Limited was wound down over the course of 2004 and early 2005.

== See also ==
- Plaxton
- Northern Counties Motor & Engineering Company
- Dennis Specialist Vehicles
- Walter Alexander Coachbuilders
- Prévost Car
- TransBus International
- Nova Bus
