= Coleman Milne =

British coachbuilder

- Company type: Private
- Industry: Coachbuilder
- Headquarters: Westhoughton, England
- Key people: Guido Dumarey, Director
- Number of employees: 200+

Coleman Milne is a coachbuilder in the United Kingdom that specialises in converting cars into funeral vehicles, stretched limousines, preparation of police vehicles and other specialist vehicles. Coleman Milne creates, builds, and sells hearses and limousines in the UK.

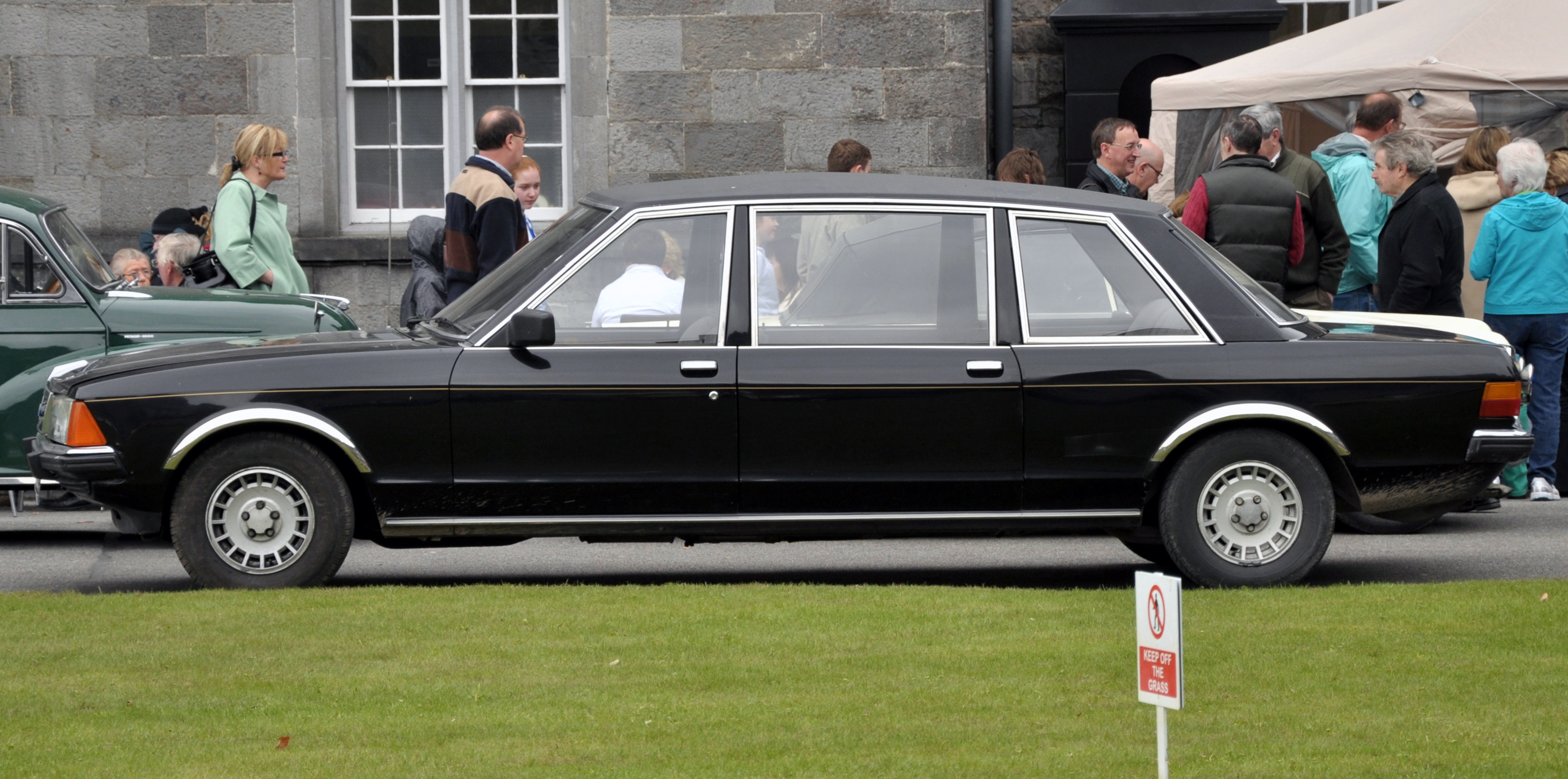
1980's Ford Granada-based Coleman Milne Grosvenor limousine

The company’s range of customers includes corporations, financial institutions, nationalised industries, local authorities, government departments, police constabularies, limousine hire companies and funeral directors. Vehicles have also been supplied to British and overseas royal families. They originally stretched the Ford Zephyr, later moving on to the Ford Granada upon which a number of versions such as the Minster, Dorchester, and Grosvenor were based. As of the autumn of 1982 the Granada-based Dorchester was also available in an estate version with elongated rear doors, called the "Windsor".

== Vehicles ==
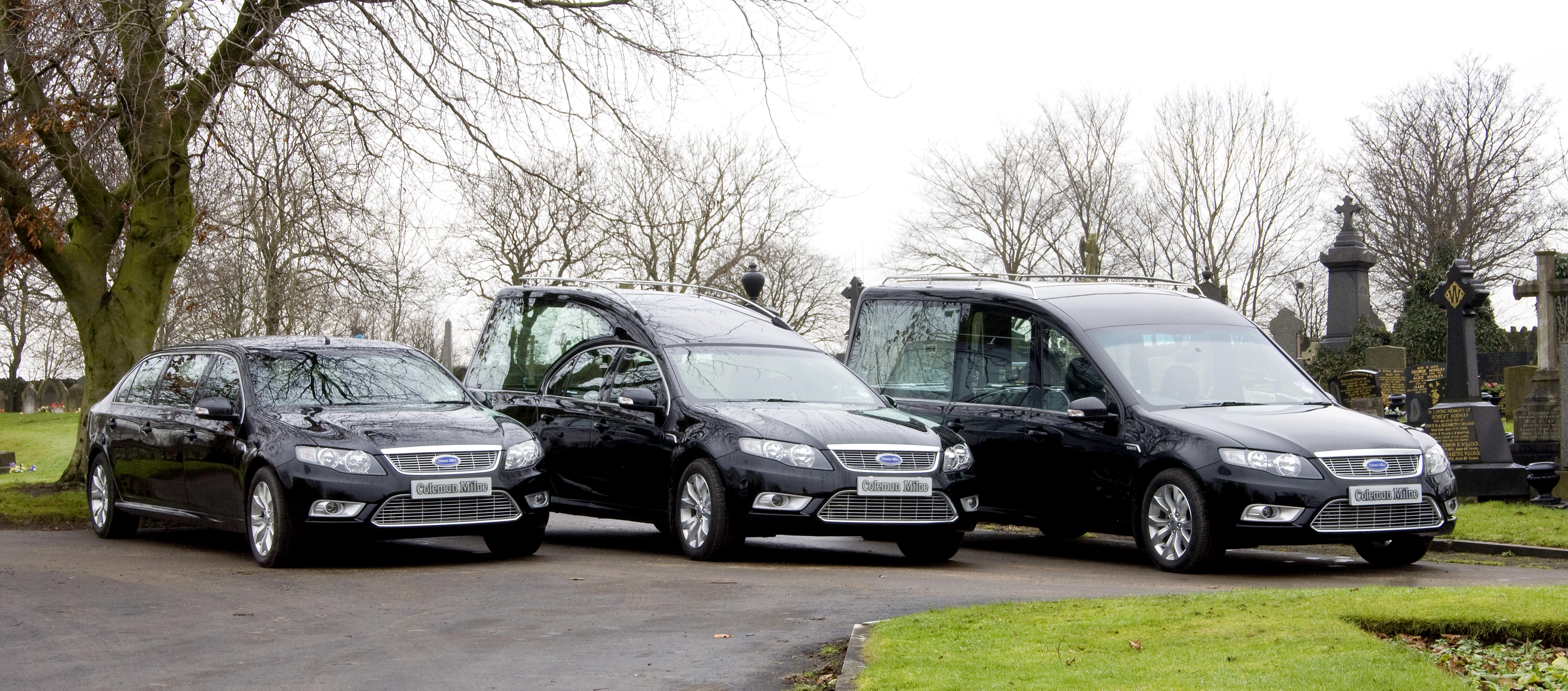
Coleman Milne Fairlane Range

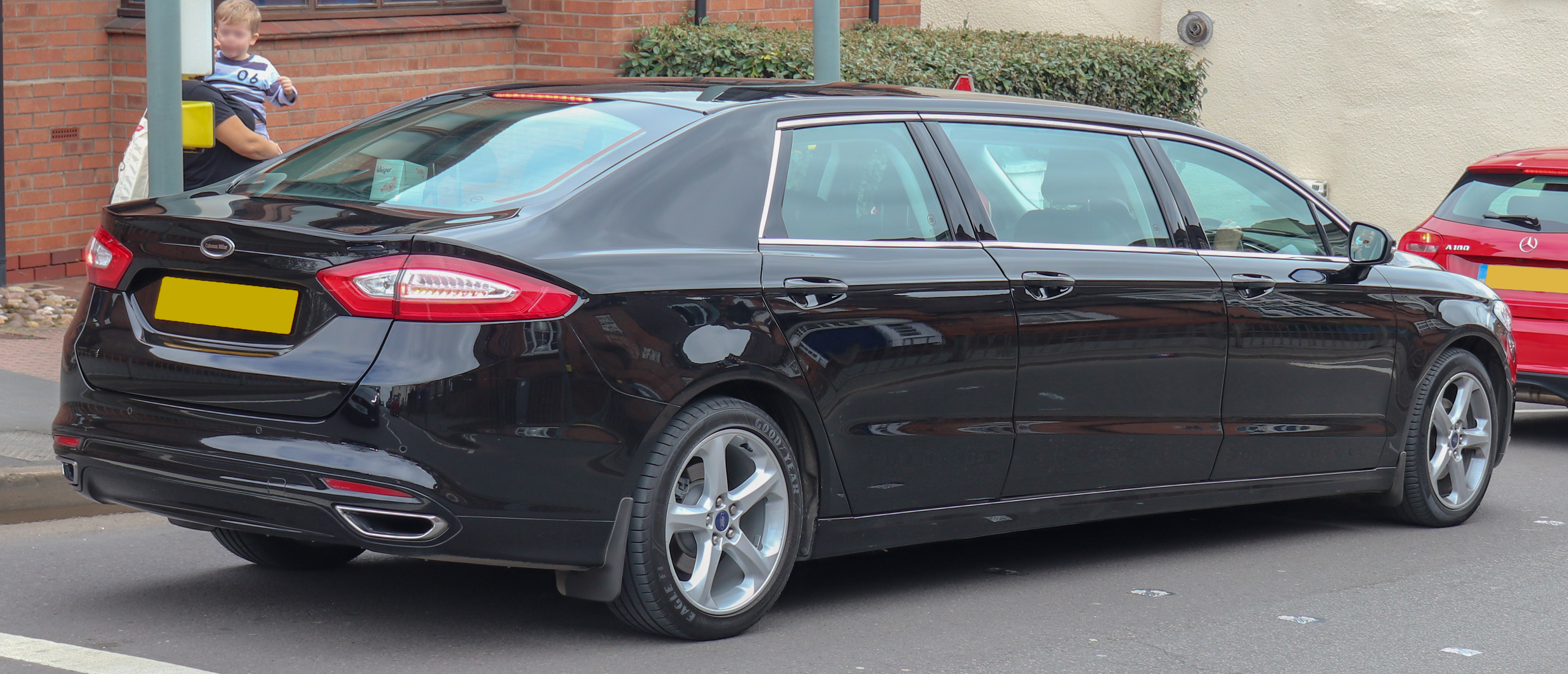
Coleman Milne Rosedale; based on a Ford Mondeo Mk V

- Mercedes 214 - Hearse and Limousine
- Ford Etive - Hearse and Limousine
- Ford Cardinal Hearse
- Ford Dorchester Limousine
- Ford Grosvenor Limousine
- Mercedes E-Class-based Hearse / Limousine
- Rolls-Royce - based Hearse and Limousine
- Mustang Mach-E Hearse and Limousine
- Mondeo Estate Removal Vehicle
- The Sure-Lift Removal Ambulance
- Galaxy Removal Vehicle

== History ==
Coleman Milne was founded by John Coleman and Roderick Milne in 1953. At first they specialised in vehicle body repairs and horse boxes. They quickly found a niche in using those skills to create limousines and funeral hearses. In 1992 a management buy-out resulted in becoming a trading division under the holding company name of Woodall Nicholson Limited.

As of 20 November 2023 the company entered administration - the notice which appeared on their website read: "Daniel James Mark Smith and Julian Heathcote were appointed Joint Administrators over Treka Bus Limited, Promech Technologies Limited, Vehicle Conversion Specialists Limited, WN Vtech Holdings Limited, JM Engineering (Scarborough) Limited and WN Vtech Limited (together "the Companies") on 20 November 2023. The affairs, business and property of the Companies are managed by the Joint Administrators. The Joint Administrators act as agents of the Companies and contract without personal liability."

In 2024, Belgian industrial entrepreneur Guido Dumarey acquired the businesses of Coleman Milne, VCS Police, Mellor Bus, Treka Bus, Promech, and JM Engineering. These operations have since been consolidated under a new holding company, Woodall Nicholson, which continues the group’s legacy as a specialist vehicle manufacturer in Europe.
