= Tswalu Kalahari Reserve =

Privately-owned game reserve in South Africa

Coordinates: 27°14′35″S 22°24′18″E

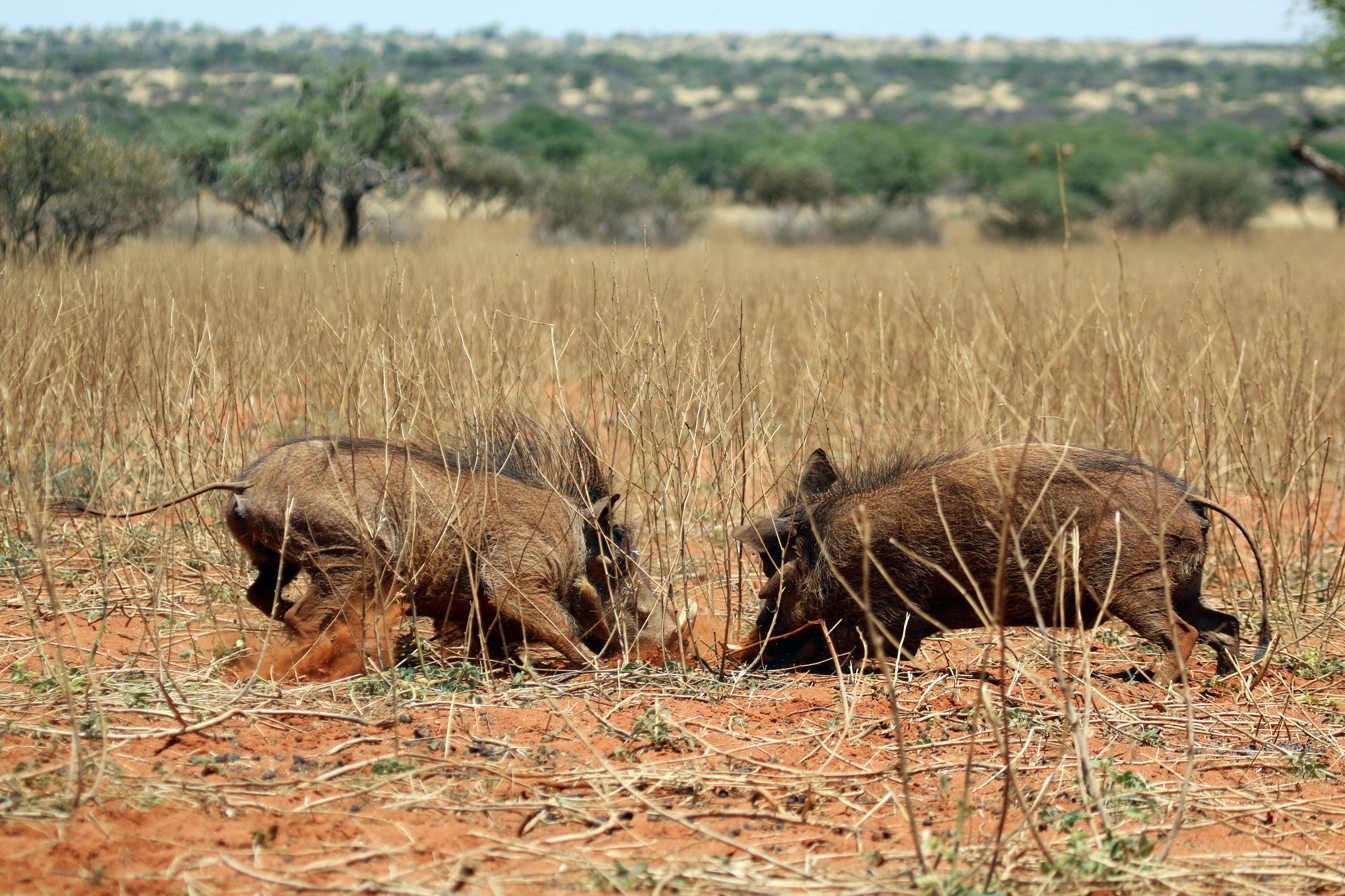
Warthogs fighting in Tswalu Kalahari Reserve

The Tswalu Kalahari Reserve is a privately owned game reserve in the Northern Cape, South Africa. It is South Africa's largest private game reserve, covering an area of over 1,110 km^{2} (430 sq mi).

== History ==
The Tswalu Game Reserve in the Southern Kalahari was created by Stephen Boler. He bought dozens of farms to create a conservation reserve, introducing African wildlife back into their natural habitat, including lions, rare types of antelope, giraffes, buffalos, black rhinos and zebras. To control the numbers and create a form of revenue to support the estate, there was a controversial hunting site called Tarkuni. After Boler's untimely death in Johannesburg in 1998 on his way to Tswalu, he specified in his will that Nicky Oppenheimer should have first refusal on Tswalu, and the Oppenheimer family now owns and operates it.

Trophy hunting was banned by the Oppenheimers and some man-made structures, farm buildings and fences were removed. New land was added to extend and protect habitats and territories. Tswalu now holds black rhino alongside other threatened species like the pangolin and canid African wild dog.

== Tswalu Kalahari (lodge) ==
Tswalu Kalahari is a luxury private lodge in the reserve, a member of National Geographic Unique Lodges of the World. There are nine suites at the Motse Lodge, with the private Tarkuni having five suites.

== Big Five game ==
The reserve boasts four of the 'big five', the exception being elephant.

== Conservation ==
Tswalu Kalahari reserve is part of the Diamond Route. The conservation work of Nicky and Strilli Oppenheimer was recognized with the WWF-Lonmin Award from the World Wide Fund for Nature in 2007.
