= Aramis Group =

French used car sales company

- Traded as: Euronext: ARAMI
- ISIN: FR0014003U94; CAC Small
- Industry: Sale of refurbished cars
- Founded: 2001
- Founder: Guillaume Paoli and Nicolas Chartier
- Headquarters: Arcueil, France
- Area served: France, Italy, Belgium, UK, Spain, Austria
- Website: aramis.group

Aramis Group is a French company that operates in online multi-brand purchase and sale of used and refurbished cars. It was founded in 2001 under the brand Aramisauto by Guillaume Paoli and Nicolas Chartier and is present in 6 European countries.

== History ==
Aramisauto was founded on September 25, 2001, by Guillaume Paoli and Nicolas Chartier.

In 2007, due to its growth, the company was awarded the "Gazelle" status by the Minister of Small and Medium-Sized Enterprises and Commerce, Renaud Dutreil.

In January 2009, the company began offering used vehicles. Starting in September 2010, it introduced a used vehicle trade-in service with no obligation to purchase a vehicle.

In 2013, the website was ranked sixth among French online sales websites in terms of revenue. At the end of 2013, the company opened its first used vehicle refurbishment factory in Donzère. In 2015, more than 5,000 used cars were refurbished.

In 2016, PSA Peugeot Citroën (now Stellantis) and Aramisauto formed a capital and strategic alliance, with PSA becoming the majority shareholder in Aramis Group, the parent company of Aramisauto.

In 2017 Aramis Group acquired Clicars, a Spanish online platform specializing in the trade, financing, buying, and selling of new and refurbished cars.

In 2018, Aramis Group acquired Cardoen, a major car retailer in Belgium. In the same year, in France, the Donzère site refurbished more than 12,000 cars.

In 2020, Aramis Group generated a revenue of 1.1 billion euros, sold 66,000 vehicles to individuals, had 1,400 employees, a network of 60 agencies, and three industrial refurbishment sites.

On June 18, 2021, Aramis Group went public and raised c. 250 million euros to accelerate its international expansion in Europe. Aramis Group is listed on Euronext Paris

In 2021, the Group also acquired a majority stake in the British platform CarSupermarket. In May 2022, the group announced its first-half results for 2021–2022, showing a revenue of 872.6 million euros, a 78% increase compared to the previous year, despite a net loss of 20.3 million euros due to decreased availability of new vehicles.

In June 2022, Aramis Group acquired Onlinecars, a B2C used cars seller in Austria.

In October 2022, Aramis Group expanded to Italy by acquiring Brumbrum, an online car retailer and car subscription company.

As of November 2022, the group operates in six European countries. owns 8 industrial scale refurbishing centers, generates nearly two billion euros in revenues, and sells more than 90,000 B2C cars annually. It receives over 70 million visitors on its digital platforms each year.

== Company structure ==
Aramisauto is a company's brand in France which operates two in-house refurbishing centers: in Donzère and Nemours.

BrumBrum is Aramis Group's brand headquartered in Milan, Italy that operates a vehicle refurbishing center in Reggio Emilia.

Cardoen is the Group's brand in Belgium, that owns 15 maintenance centers spread throughout the country and a refurbishing center in Antwerp.

CarSupermarket is Aramis Group's platform dedicated to buying and selling used cars in the UK. In addition to its platforms, it operates 12 customer centers and 1 refurbishment center.

Clicars is the Group's brand in Spain, that operates an in-house refurbishment center in Madrid.

Onlinecars is the Group's brand in Austria, which is present in three locations in Austria (Velden, Vienna, and Graz) and has its own refurbishing center near Graz.
