= The National Anthem (Black Mirror) =

- Black Mirror episode
- Prime Minister Michael Callow (Rory Kinnear) before having filmed sexual intercourse with a pig
- Episode no.: Series 1 Episode 1
- Directed by: Otto Bathurst
- Written by: Charlie Brooker
- Cinematography by: Jake Polonsky
- Editing by: Chris Barwell
- Original air date: 4 December 2011
- Running time: 44 minutes

Guest appearances
- Rory Kinnear as Michael Callow; Lindsay Duncan as Alex Cairns; Donald Sumpter as Julian Hereford; Tom Goodman-Hill as Tom Blice; Anna Wilson-Jones as Jane Callow; Patrick Kennedy as Section Chief Walker; Alastair Mackenzie as Martin; Chetna Pandya as Malaika; Alex Macqueen as Special Agent Callett; Jay Simpson as Flynn/Rod Senseless; Lydia Wilson as Princess Susannah

Episode chronology
← Previous —	Next → "Fifteen Million Merits"

"The National Anthem" is the series premiere of the British science fiction anthology series Black Mirror. Written by series creator and showrunner Charlie Brooker, it was directed by Otto Bathurst and first aired on Channel 4 on 4 December 2011.

In the episode, a member of the British royal family is kidnapped and will only be released if the British prime minister Michael Callow (Rory Kinnear) has sexual intercourse with a pig on live television. Scenes follow government attempts to track the kidnapper, news coverage of the unfolding events and public reaction. "The National Anthem" had several inspirations, the idea originally conceived by Brooker years previous, with broadcaster Terry Wogan in place of a prime minister. It had a deliberately serious tone.

Reviewers identified themes including the spread of information across social media, the relationship between politicians and the public, and the role of news media. The episode garnered seven-day ratings of 2.07 million viewers, alongside many viewer complaints to broadcasting regulatory body Ofcom. Mostly positive professional reviews found the episode to be a good opener for the series, plausible in its storyline and well-acted, though some critics dissented. On average, reviewers have ranked the episode middling in comparison to other Black Mirror instalments.

The episode was later compared to Piggate, an anecdote published in the 2015 biography Call Me Dave, which alleged that British prime minister of the time, David Cameron, had placed a "private part of his anatomy" into a dead pig's head as an initiation rite at university.

== Plot ==
British prime minister Michael Callow (Rory Kinnear) is woken at night to learn that Princess Susannah (Lydia Wilson), a beloved royal, has been kidnapped. As ransom, the kidnapper demands that the prime minister have sexual intercourse with a pig, live on national television. These demands were posted on YouTube and have been viewed by tens of thousands of people, whilst the topic is trending on Twitter. In the morning, news media stop complying with a D-Notice issued by the government which requested that they not broadcast the story. Within hours, tens of millions have seen the video.

Unbeknownst to Callow, Home Secretary Alex Cairns (Lindsay Duncan) orders Special Agent Callett (Alex Macqueen) to arrange for footage to be fabricated. Callett plans for Callow's head to be digitally composited on porn star Rod Senseless (Jay Simpson), a difficult task given the kidnapper's technical specifications for the broadcast. After a person at the studio tweets an image of Senseless, the kidnapper sends a news channel a severed finger and a video of Susannah writhing in pain as punishment. In a sharp change of opinion, a majority of the public now expect Callow to follow the kidnapper's demands, to the distress of Callow's wife Jane (Anna Wilson-Jones).

Meanwhile, an armed team raid a building from where the YouTube video was first uploaded, but it is a decoy. The journalist Malaika (Chetna Pandya) learned of the raid from a government staff member to whom she has sent sexually explicit selfies. Having filmed the scene, Malaika is shot in the leg as she tries to flee.

Cairns tells Callow that he will jeopardise his public image and family's safety if he refuses to comply with the kidnapper. He reluctantly agrees. As a deterrent to viewers, a painful tone plays before the broadcast begins; possession of a recording will become illegal at midnight. Gravely, Callow has intercourse with a pig while 1.3 billion people watch.

Cairns is informed that Princess Susannah was released unharmed in London on the Millennium Bridge 30 minutes before the broadcast, a fact she keeps secret from Callow. The finger sent to the news station was actually the kidnapper's—Turner Prize-winning artist Carlton Bloom, who hanged himself during the broadcast. As Callow vomits in a toilet, ignoring Jane's phone calls, Cairns tells him that Susannah is safe. A year later, Susannah is pregnant and Callow's approval rating has improved. However, behind closed doors, he begs Jane to speak to him as she silently walks away.

== Production ==
The executive producers Charlie Brooker and Annabel Jones began work on Black Mirror in 2010, having previously worked together on other television programmes. The series was commissioned for three hour-long episodes by Channel 4, taking its budget from the comedy department. Brooker's production company Zeppotron produced the show for Endemol. "The National Anthem" was the first episode of Black Mirror to air, premiering on 4 December 2011 at 9 p.m. The following two episodes, "Fifteen Million Merits" and "The Entire History of You", premiered a week and a fortnight later, respectively. "The National Anthem" was the third script to be pitched to Channel 4, the first of which was "Fifteen Million Merits" and the second of which was not produced.

=== Conception and writing ===
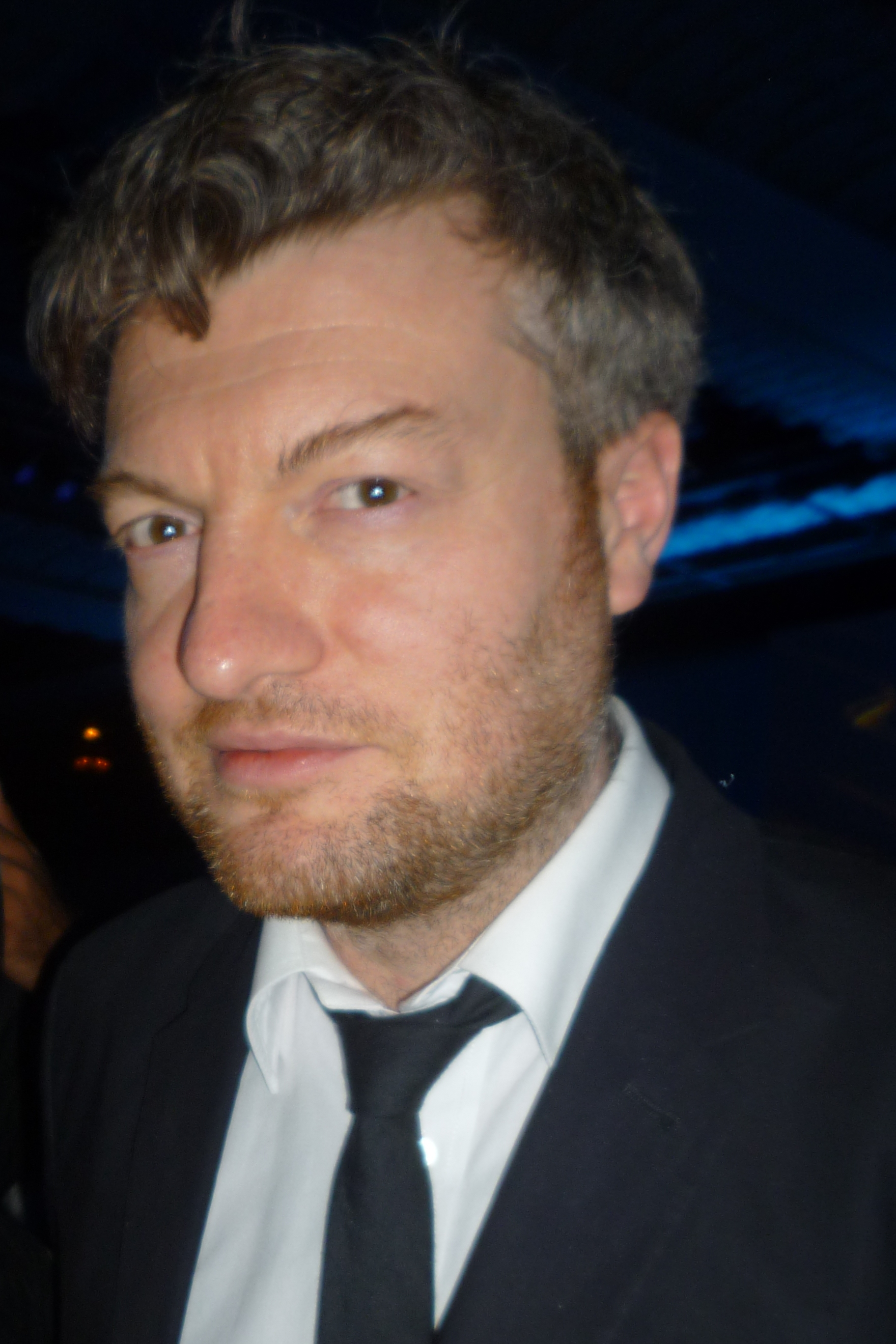
Series creator Charlie Brooker wrote the episode.

The initial idea for the episode involved a celebrity carrying out the sex act. Series creator Charlie Brooker had previously conceived of a short story where the broadcaster Terry Wogan would have to have "full sexual intercourse with a sow" on television in order to secure the release of a kidnapped princess, later mentioning the idea in a 2002 column for The Guardian. Brooker later became interested in parodying the American action series 24. Whilst working on the story, he realised it would not be humorous. Like his previous work Dead Set, a 2008 horror series about zombies, he decided to "take something preposterous but make the tone very straight". The title of the episode refers both to "God Save the Queen", the UK's former national anthem, and Radiohead song "The National Anthem".

Brooker also took inspiration from a controversy where Gordon Brown called a member of the public "a bigot" after speaking with her, and also a Fabulous Furry Freak Brothers comic where he believed recalling that "a police chief is required to have sex with a hog". Another inspiration was the reality show I'm a Celebrity...Get Me Out of Here!, particularly an episode where a celebrity was tasked with consuming a mixture of disgusting animal parts. Annabel Jones described the episode's topic as "humiliation and the public's appetite for humiliation".

Brooker noted that other animals similar to a pig were considered for the sex act. A duck was believed too small and absurd, whilst a horse or donkey would be too difficult for filming; Brooker also objected to a chicken. Even considered was "a giant wheel of cheese", but a pig was chosen to "[straddle] the line between comic and horrifying." A scene in which Callow spoke to Rod Senseless was removed, as its comedic style was out of place. Another cut scene showed Malaika taken to hospital and left on a gurney as the staff watch Callow have sex with the pig; removing this meant the setting of a hospital for some scenes was unexplained.

=== Filming ===
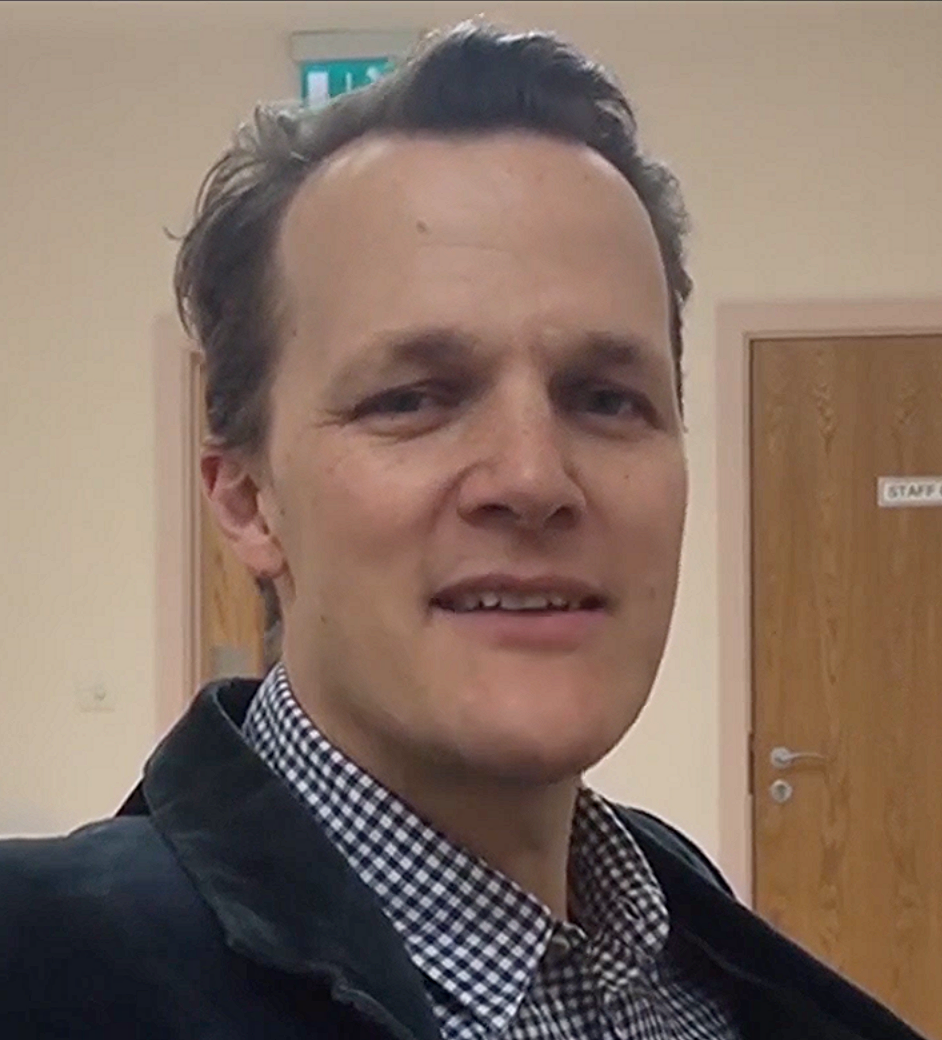
Otto Bathurst directed the episode.

Rory Kinnear stars in the episode as Prime Minister Michael Callow. Lindsay Duncan plays the Home Secretary Alex Cairns and Alex Macqueen plays Special Agent Callett, whilst Anna Wilson-Jones had the role of Callow's wife Jane. During the casting process, executive producer Annabel Jones was keen to hire non-comedy actors so that a humorous tone could be avoided. Director Otto Bathurst commented that the production's first choice for every role was hired. Callow's political party is not stated, though Brooker says his blue tie implies that he is a member of the Conservative Party, a right-wing party in Britain. Jones commented that it would have been easy to make the audience hate Callow, but the focus was on the public's appetite for humiliation.

Filming overlapped with the London riots of August 2011. Brooker and his wife Konnie Huq watched the filming of the scene where Callow has sex with the pig. Brooker reported that in the first take, Bathurst did not call "cut", and instead let Kinnear carry on getting closer to the pig, putting his hand on the pig's back, until Kinnear refused to go further. The scene was completed in only a couple of takes and was never designed to be more graphic than the final cut.

The scene in which Callow attacks Cairns was written to be "visceral", with Brooker noting that he was unsure how a prime minister would act in the situation, and Bathurst commenting that though Callow should be "kicked out of politics", his actions go without consequence. In regards to the scene in which Callow's wife expresses distress to her husband, Brooker registered surprise that some viewers were angry at her character. The scene was intended for her to "‍[communicate] how upset she is".

== Marketing ==
During UK pre-publicity, the central concept of a pig was deliberately unmentioned; the Channel 4 trailers, which were briefly run on ITV and in cinemas, also avoided mentioning this. This led to some viewers expecting a political thriller. The episode aired in Australia in June 2013, a year and a half after the UK premiere, as part of Studio's "Festival of WTF!" A billboard featuring Callow about to have intercourse with the pig was shown in Kings Cross, New South Wales, in May 2013, but soon removed, with a spokesperson for the channel apologising and plans to show the image in print and online suspended.

== Analysis ==
"The National Anthem" is a black comedy and political satire, played straight as a drama. Reviewers varied in finding the episode overall comedic, or only finding humour in limited parts of the episode, such as Rod Senseless's character. A theme identified in the episode was the spread of information amongst a country with both news media and social media such as Twitter. Richard Edwards of GamesRadar+ wrote that "nobody has any control of the spread of information any more", whilst David Lewis of Cultbox said that the society depicted was "so constantly bombarded with data that it is no longer able to process information". Emily Yoshida of Grantland commented that this "information [...] is not making us better or smarter or happier".

Reviewers also identified the relationship between politicians and the public as a key theme, with Lewis describing the episode as an "exploration of the potency of public opinion". Michael Ahr of Den of Geek commented that the internet serves as a "weapon of attack" in the episode, whilst Jim Goodwin of Bleeding Cool noted that "anonymously vented opinions can not only fuel but also help form the actions of government". Ahr believed that the episode is a "condemnation of empty rhetoric and slippery politicians", and Edwards found it "scarily believable" that "politicians are no longer making decisions based on their own judgement, but on the way the story is trending on Twitter". Additionally, Goodwin commented that viewers are made to examine "their own culpability in the media frenzies that surround such events" as that of the kidnapping. Similarly, Corey Atad of Esquire found that the episode examines how mainstream news and social media can both "bring out some of the very worst in collective human instincts". The result of the incident, according to John Crace of The Guardian, is that Callow "lost the love of his wife and gained the sympathy of the nation". In regards to the plot twist that the kidnapper is a famous artist, David Sims of The A.V. Club suggested that the kidnapper views the recording of Callow "as a new form of artistic expression".

The episode was compared to the American 1959 television anthology The Twilight Zone, a programme from which Brooker took inspiration. Michael Hogan of The Telegraph made further comparisons to British political satire The Thick of It, with its "corridors-of-power voyeurism", and the British spy drama Spooks, with its "clock-ticking tension".

=== Comparisons to Piggate ===
In September 2015, four years after "The National Anthem" was first broadcast, the Daily Mail published allegations that David Cameron—the British prime minister at the time—had placed a "private part of his anatomy" into the mouth of a dead pig as an initiation rite at university. The allegations came from an unauthorised biography of Cameron, Call Me Dave by Michael Ashcroft and Isabel Oakeshott. This incident is widely known as "piggate". Black Mirror trended on Twitter following the Daily Mail article's publication, and some people used the hashtag #snoutrage, which appears onscreen during the episode, to refer to the incident. Brooker responded on Twitter on the day allegations were first made, denying prior knowledge and describing it the day after as "a complete coincidence, albeit a quite bizarre one". Finding the story perturbing, he remarked that: "I did genuinely for a moment wonder if reality was a simulation, whether it exists only to trick me."

== Reception ==
Airing on Channel 4 on 4 December 2011 at 9 p.m., the episode garnered 2.07 million viewers, according to seven-day figures from the Broadcasters' Audience Research Board (BARB). It was nominated for Best Single Drama at the 2013 Broadcast Awards. However, out of television broadcasts in 2011, "The National Anthem" received the eighth-most complaints to Ofcom, a total of 145 ranging from the use of profanity to the themes of bestiality, kidnapping, suicide, terrorism and torture. An additional complaint came from a woman featured briefly in a vox pop, whose claim of invasion of privacy was not upheld by Ofcom.

=== Critical reception ===
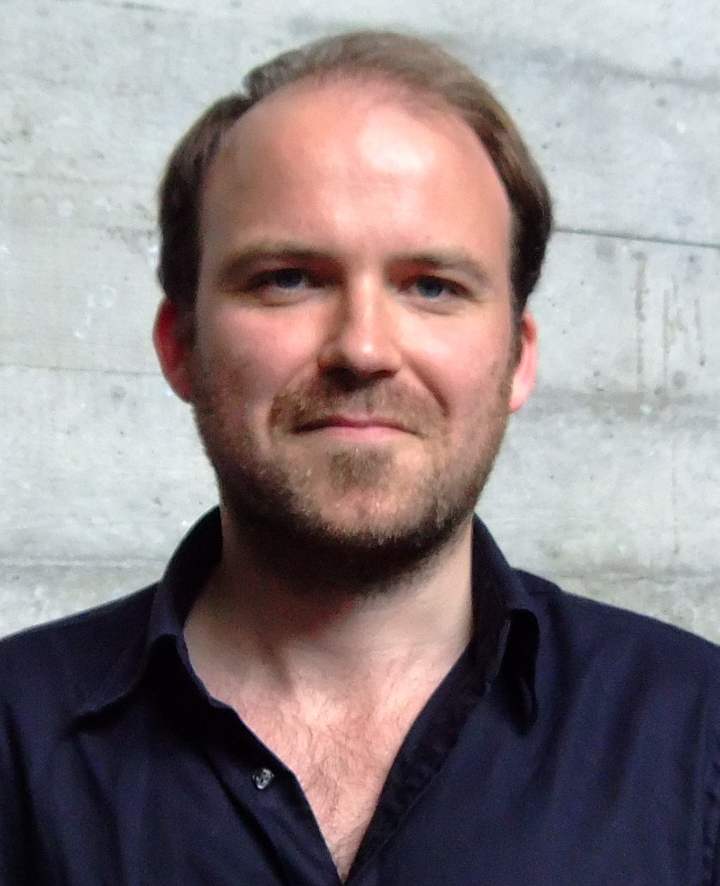
Rory Kinnear

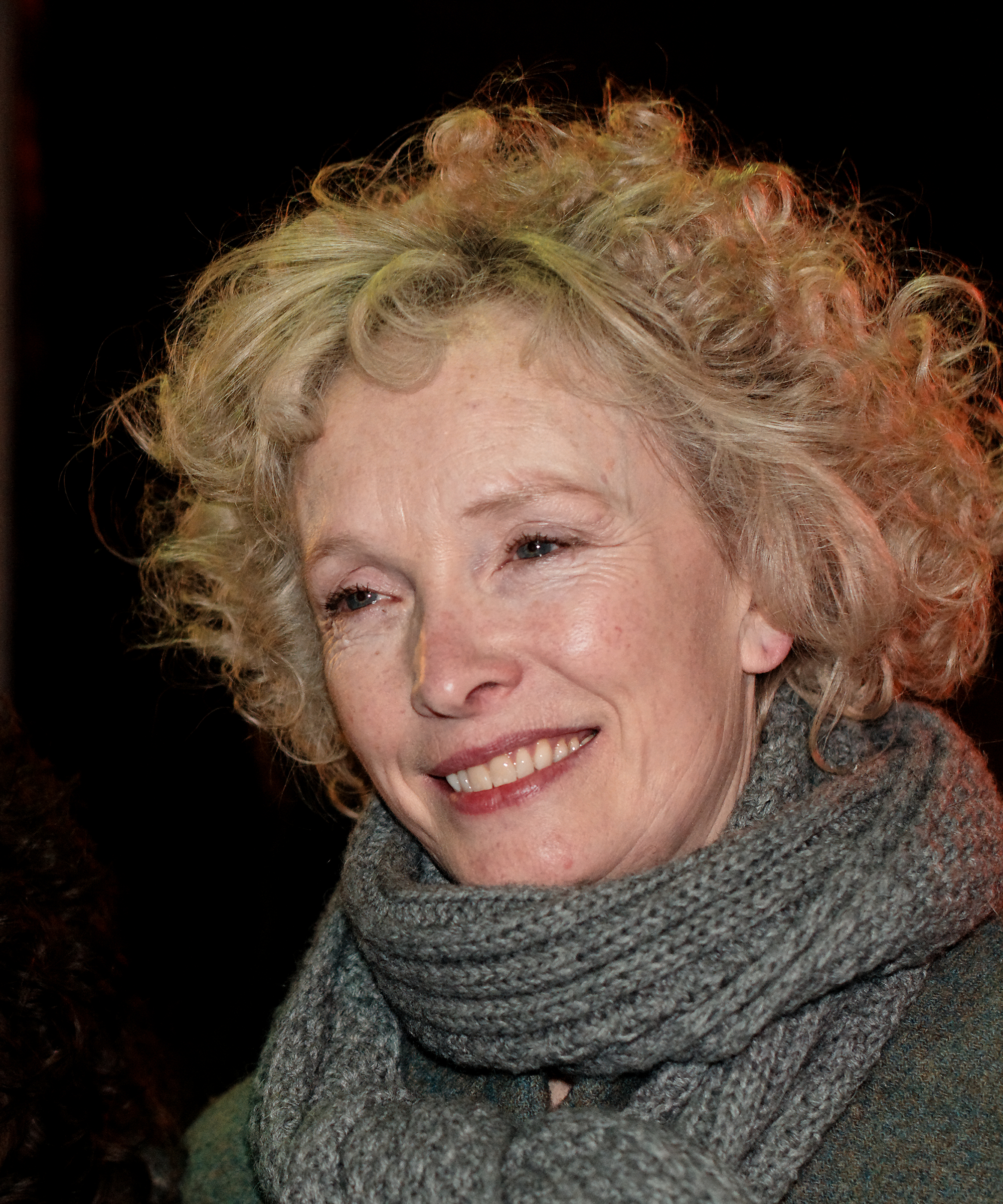
Lindsay Duncan

Kinnear and Duncan's performances as Michael Callow and Alex Cairns respectively, were positively received by critics.

The episode received mostly positive critical reviews. On the review aggregator website Rotten Tomatoes, it holds an approval rating of 100% based on 18 reviews, with an average rating of 9.00/10. The website's critics consensus reads: "This inaugural tale of political machinations and elite perversions works as a scalding satire and a nightmare of burgeoning technology gone awry, making it a perfect sampler for viewers seeking to step through the looking glass." It received an A rating in The A.V. Club, 4.5 out of five stars in The Telegraph, four out of five stars in Cultbox, and 3.5 out of five stars in GamesRadar+. Ahr called the themes of politics and social media "prophetic". Yoshida and reviewers at TheWrap both found it the perfect opener for Black Mirror, with Ahr concurring that it was "an effective opener despite its off-putting premise". However, James Hibberd commented that the episode is "divisive" and reported that fans often recommend beginning with a different episode. The episode's premise, of the prime minister having sex with a pig, was called "devastatingly, horrifyingly simple" by Sims. Edwards felt amusement initially, and later "revulsion and pity" as the episode progressed.

Most reviewers found the episode plausible. Sims commented that "every twist seems organic" and "every decision rational", leading the audience to overlook "the insanity of the premise or any minor plothole". Yoshida believed that the episode has "an airtight internal logic", and Lewis wrote that it was "exactly what you might expect to happen if the situation ever arose". However, Crace found that the premise lacked credibility, and the episode was less believable as it progressed. Edwards criticised that the episode does not provide new insight into social media.

The acting received a positive critical reception, with Goodwin describing the cast as "high calibre". Ranking Kinnear as Michael Callow to be the 10th best performance in the Black Mirror franchise, Brian Tallerico of Vulture reviewed that the episode only works due to Kinnear's "emotional commitment to the character and concept". Hogan praised Kinnear's acting "particularly compelling" in his emotional journey "from disbelief to dutiful self-sacrifice". Crace thought his character arc was "both touching and funny". Lewis found him "dignified, stoic and – crucially – likeable", with Goodwin describing him as "flawed yet entirely sympathetic". Lindsay Duncan's role, as Callow's Home Secretary, was also received positively. Crace found her "understated" acting "a delight", whilst Goodwin praised her "ruthless" performance. Goodwin further praised Tom Goodman-Hill in his role of "the morally malleable face of political spin" and Anna Wilson-Jones as Callow's wife, for bringing "grounded emotional connection" to the episode.

=== Black Mirror episode rankings ===
"The National Anthem" received middling rankings on many critics' lists of the 23 instalments of Black Mirror, from best to worst:

- 2nd – Corey Atad, Esquire
- 4th – Charles Bramesco, Vulture
- 6th – Ed Power, The Telegraph
- 7th – James Hibberd, Entertainment Weekly
- 10th – Morgan Jeffery, Digital Spy
- 12th – Aubrey Page, Collider
- 14th – Matt Donnelly and Tim Molloy, TheWrap
- 15th – Travis Clark, Business Insider

Other critics ranked the 13 episodes in Black Mirror's first three series, where "The National Anthem" received varied reviews:

- 1st – Mat Elfring, GameSpot
- 5th (of the Top Ten) – Brendan Doyle, Comingsoon.net
- 8th – Andrew Wallenstein, Variety
- 10th – Jacob Hall, /Film
- 12th – Adam David, CNN Philippines

== See also ==
- List of fictional prime ministers of the United Kingdom
