= Piggate =

British political scandal

"Piggate" refers to a claim that, during his time at Oxford University, future British prime minister David Cameron inserted his penis or scrotum into a dead pig's mouth as part of an initiation ceremony for the Piers Gaveston Society. The anecdote was reported by Michael Ashcroft and Isabel Oakeshott in their unauthorised biography of Cameron, Call Me Dave, attributing the story to an anonymous Member of Parliament who was allegedly a contemporary of Cameron's at the University of Oxford. Extracts from the book were published in the Daily Mail on 20 September 2015, prior to its publication.

Downing Street sources responded by saying that Cameron would not dignify the anecdote with a response, while friends reported him saying that it was "utter nonsense." Cameron said later that "a very specific denial was made a week ago." Ashcroft and Oakeshott failed to receive a response from the purported owner of a photograph of the alleged incident. No corroborating evidence has been produced to support the anecdote. In an interview, Valentine Guinness, one of the Piers Gaveston Society founders, said that as far as he knew, Cameron "may well have attended one of their parties" but was never a member.

== Anecdote ==
It was alleged in Call Me Dave – an unauthorised biography of the former British prime minister David Cameron by Michael Ashcroft and Isabel Oakeshott – that, as a student at Oxford University, former British prime minister David Cameron inserted "a private part of his anatomy" into the mouth of a dead pig, as part of an initiation ceremony for the Piers Gaveston Society. Ashcroft and Oakeshott recount that a Member of Parliament and contemporary of Cameron's at the University of Oxford told them the anecdote at a business dinner in June 2014. They initially assumed the statement to be a joke, but the MP repeated the anecdote some weeks later, and for a third time with more detail some months after that. The MP said he saw photographic evidence of the event, describing the dimensions of the alleged photograph and naming an individual who he claimed now possessed the image.

Ashcroft and Oakeshott failed to receive a response from the purported owner of a photograph of the alleged incident, and since the extract's publication no corroborating evidence has as yet been produced to support the anecdote. In their book, Ashcroft and Oakeshott commented that "Perhaps it is a case of mistaken identity. Yet it is an elaborate story for an otherwise credible figure to invent." Speaking to Channel 4 News in September 2015, Oakeshott said: "We couldn't get to the bottom of that source's allegations ... So we merely reported the account that the source gave us ... We don't say whether we believe it to be true". Speaking at the Cheltenham Literature Festival in October 2015, Oakeshott said that the source of the allegation "could have been slightly deranged" and said that "there is no need for burden of proof on a colourful anecdote where we’re quite upfront about our own reservations about whether to take it seriously".

The anecdote first came to public attention when extracts from the book were published in the Daily Mail on 20 September 2015, prior to its publication. A YouGov poll shortly after the story originally broke showed that 66% believed the allegations, compared to 24% who did not.

== Background ==
Ashcroft had long been a supporter of the British Conservative Party and was its biggest donor, having donated around £10 million, before dropping his support for the party in 2013 due to conflicts with David Cameron, especially his refusal to give Ashcroft a senior role in government despite his donations. Some commentators have interpreted the pig story and other anecdotes in the book as Ashcroft's revenge and reignition of the feud.

== Response ==
After being asked about the anecdote, Downing Street said that it would not "dignify" the claim with a response. The Independent reported that Cameron had told friends the claim was "utter nonsense".

Cameron joked about the situation during a talk in Oxford later that week, stating: "I've had an interesting week. It's a week in which thousands of trees have died in vain, sales of Supertramp albums have gone through the roof and one man's reputation lies in ruins. I don't think Michael Ashcroft will ever recover." Six days after the story broke, Cameron responded to a question about the issue saying: "Everyone can see why the book was written and everyone can see straight through it. As for the specific issue raised, a very specific denial was made a week ago and I've nothing to add to that." At the time of the statement, Downing Street had made no on-the-record denial of the anecdote. Cameron also stated that he was deferring taking action at the present time to sue Ashcroft over the allegations because he was "too busy running the country".

With the specific detail that the source of the story was a contemporary of Cameron's at Oxford, speculation mounted about which of the limited number of candidates could be the source of the story. Conservative Party vice-chairman and former MP Mark Field was initially suspected within his own party as having been the source of the anecdote due to having briefed the co-author Isabel Oakeshott. Government sources accused Field of fabricating the anecdote as a part of a leadership plot, an allegation he furiously denied. Other MPs would go on to deny being the source, including Boris Johnson and Ed Vaizey, as Downing Street announced the launch of an investigation into the identity of the MP in question.

Valentine Guinness, one of the founders of the Piers Gaveston Society, was quoted by journalist Toby Young as saying that although David Cameron "may well have attended one of their parties", as far as he knew Cameron "was never a member of the Piers Gaveston Society", so would not have taken part in such an initiation ceremony. Guinness called the story "purely malicious gossip". Young and Cameron attended Oxford together.

On 21 September 2015, James Kirkup in The Daily Telegraph wrote: "Toby Young, a Telegraph writer, [...] has investigated Mr Cameron’s university antics and found no evidence of the pig incident. 'I think it’s a figment of someone’s imagination,' he says."

In his 2019 autobiography, For the Record, Cameron wrote: "The first I heard of putting private parts in pigs was when Craig told me about the allegation on the morning of 21 September 2015. My first reaction wasn’t anger or embarrassment or worry about the impact. It was hilarity. I couldn't believe someone could be so stupid as to research and write a book about me and include a story which was both false and ludicrous."

== Reactions ==
Within minutes of the Daily Mail posting an article about the anecdote, #piggate, #snoutrage and #hameron became trending topics on Twitter. The "Piggate" name was quickly accepted by the media reporting on it. This example of social media distraction was so great that there were concerns from some employers about the impact on workplace productivity.

After the anecdote appeared, social media users quickly made connections to "The National Anthem", the premiere episode of Black Mirror, wherein a fictional prime minister is forced to have sex with a pig. Series creator Charlie Brooker, who wrote the episode, quickly denied any prior knowledge of the allegations, calling the situation "a complete coincidence, albeit a quite bizarre one."

Suzanne Moore in The Guardian compared the incident to the story related by Hunter S. Thompson on Lyndon B. Johnson's campaign tactics early in his political career. Johnson supposedly planned to spread a fabricated story that his opponent had a penchant for "carnal knowledge of his own barnyard sows". Although the story was unbelievable, Johnson's purpose, according to Thompson, was to force his opponent to discuss it even in a refutation: "But let's make the sonofabitch deny it."

Journalist Solomon Hughes has argued that Ashcroft "has an 18th century attitude towards buying a place in government" and says that Ashcroft thought that his donations to the Conservative Party would provide him with a "shortcut" to a ministerial position. He says that, when Cameron "didn't let Ashcroft buy a place in government", Ashcroft filled his book with "barely political smears". Hughes argues that this means the book "tells us something about our political world, but not much about David Cameron".

Claims were made that the story was deliberately avoided by some media sources. The initial decision not to report on the anecdote by the BBC and some other broadcasters was criticised by the assistant editor of The Independent, Ian Burrell, who described its choice to "dodge" the story of the day as "unacceptable". The BBC covered the story from 21 September.

The publication of the anecdote elicited responses from other politicians as well as media, such as a clip by Cassetteboy parodying Will Smith's song "Gettin' Jiggy wit It" and an animated enactment from Next Media Animation. HBO's satirical news program, Last Week Tonight with John Oliver, also covered the published anecdote, saying 'bizarre is a kind way of describing it'.

Labour Party leader Jeremy Corbyn criticised the media's handling of the accusations, telling ITV News: "The media treatment of any politician [over] unsubstantiated allegations, be it David Cameron, me or anyone else is wrong, too much of our media is obsessed with personality politics."

Then UKIP leader, Nigel Farage referred to the matter in the context of the build up to the referendum on the United Kingdom's membership of the European union in 2016. After noting that there was the "In" campaign and the "Out" camp, he reflected: "And then we've got the Prime Minister. Or should I call him, in this context, piggy in the middle". Nicola Sturgeon of the SNP also made reference to the incident, accusing Cameron of being "pig-headed" with regards to the 2014 Scottish independence referendum.

On 4 October 2015, a protest rally outside the Conservative Party conference in Manchester city centre was attended by a reported 60,000 people. A number of demonstrators carried signs or wore costume items referring to the anecdote. At one of the country's biggest Bonfire night celebrations in Lewes, a large effigy of Cameron with a pig's head was processed through the town and then burnt.

In November 2015, solicitor Myles Jackman said that performing a sexual act with a dead animal would not be illegal under the Sexual Offences Act 2003. He stated that possessing a photograph of such an act would be illegal under the Criminal Justice and Immigration Act 2008 if it was produced for pornographic purposes, but not if the purpose was "satire, political commentary or simple grossness".
