= Isabel Oakeshott =

British political journalist

- Born: 12 June 1974 (age 52)
- Education: University of Bristol
- Occupation: Political journalist
- Spouse(s): Nigel Rosser (divorced) Richard Tice (m. 2026)
- Children: 3

Isabel Oakeshott (born 12 June 1974) is a British political journalist.

Oakeshott was the political editor of The Sunday Times and is the co-author, with Michael Ashcroft, of an unauthorised biography of former British prime minister David Cameron, Call Me Dave, and of other non-fiction titles, including White Flag? An Examination of the UK's Defence Capability, also written with Ashcroft, Farmageddon, co-written with Philip Lymbery, and Pandemic Diaries, co-written with Matt Hancock, which provides an account of Hancock's tenure as the UK's Health Secretary during the COVID-19 pandemic.

== Early life ==
Oakeshott was educated at St George's School, Edinburgh, and then at Gordonstoun School in Moray, Scotland. In 1996, she graduated with a BA in history from the University of Bristol.

== Journalism career ==
Oakeshott is regarded as a right-wing journalist.

Oakeshott began her career in journalism in Scotland, working for the East Lothian Courier, Edinburgh Evening News, Daily Record, Sunday Mirror and Daily Mail, before moving to London and joining the Evening Standard as the health correspondent. After three years, she moved to The Sunday Times in 2006 as deputy political editor, becoming political editor in 2010, and remained until 2014. She was awarded the title Political Journalist of the Year at the 2011 Press Awards.

In 2013, while at The Sunday Times, she persuaded Vicky Pryce to implicate Pryce's estranged husband, former Liberal Democrat MP and Cabinet minister Chris Huhne, in having committed the offence of perverting the course of justice, leading to the case R v Huhne, and to both Pryce and Huhne being convicted and imprisoned.

Oakeshott has appeared as a panelist on the BBC's Daily Politics and Question Time, and has been a contributor to Sky News' Press Preview programme.

Between February 2016 and early 2017, Oakeshott was the Daily Mail's political editor-at-large. In 2019, she wrote a series of articles for The Mail on Sunday based on leaked diplomatic memos written by the British Ambassador to the United States Sir Kim Darroch, in which he criticised the Trump administration. The leak led to his resignation.

In July 2019, The Guardian amended an article by its parliamentary sketch writer John Crace which contained a sentence that had potentially implied that Oakeshott obtained the Darroch emails by sleeping with Nigel Farage or Arron Banks. At the time, she called the comment "demonstrably false and extraordinarily sexist". The newspaper later published an apology.

In September 2021, GB News announced that Oakeshott would be hosting a weekly show on the channel. She left to join TalkTV as its International Editor in April 2022. Her prominence in these roles led to the New Statesman naming her as the 32nd most influential right-wing political figure in the UK in 2023.

In October 2024, the Black Triangle Campaign, a disability organisation, referred Oakshott to Ofcom after a TalkTV interview in which she criticised Chancellor Rachel Reeves for failing to announce a "crackdown" on young people on sickness benefits in the 2024 Budget, and described young people on out-of-work benefits as "parasites". TalkTV responded to the complaint by stating: "Isabel Oakeshott failed to caveat her comments to reflect she did not mean all benefit claimants were gaming the system. In debates on this issue, she frequently emphasises the importance of supporting those in genuine need." Ofcom issued its decision in May 2025, dismissing the Black Triangle Campaign's complaint, noting that while Oakshott's words "had the potential to cause offence to some viewers", Ofcom's rules allowed for "the broadcast of controversial and provocative opinion… which regular viewers would expect from this programme".

== Writing career ==
Oakeshott has written a number of non-fiction books. Inside Out, co-written with, or ghostwritten for, Labour Party insider Peter Watt, is an inside look at New Labour. Farmageddon: the true cost of cheap meat, co-written with Philip Lymbery, addresses the effects of industrial-scale meat production.

Call Me Dave, co-written with Michael Ashcroft, is an unauthorised biography of former British prime minister David Cameron. One of the details in the book – that Cameron, during his university days, allegedly performed a sex act involving a dead pig – caused controversy upon publication. The unsubstantiated story was dependent on hearsay, and Oakeshott subsequently conceded her source could have been "deranged".

In 2018, she co-authored with Ashcroft a book on the state of the British Armed Forces, White Flag?.

The Bad Boys of Brexit is an inside account of the Leave.EU campaign during the run-up to the Brexit referendum, which she had ghostwritten for UKIP donor and Leave.EU funder Arron Banks. She was in possession of details about Russia's cultivation and handling of Banks, that he was in regular contact with Russian officials from 2015 to 2017, but publicly downplayed Russian involvement with him.

Oakeshott helped former Health Secretary Matt Hancock write his book, Pandemic Diaries, The Inside Story Of Britain's Battle Against Covid.

=== Lockdown Files ===
Oakeshott then passed more than 100,000 of Hancock's WhatsApp messages to The Daily Telegraph, who began to publish them in February 2023 in a series called the Lockdown Files. She had been given the messages for the purpose of using them to help write Hancock's book, and she was subject to a contractual confidentiality restriction. The files revealed details of the health and public-order decision-making during the COVID-19 lockdown, and various political figures and civil servants including Hancock himself, then Prime Minister Boris Johnson, the UK's most senior civil servant, the Cabinet Secretary Simon Case, Chief Medical Officer Chris Whitty, and Chancellor of the Exchequer Rishi Sunak.

Oakeshott said that leaking the messages was in the public interest. Oakeshott said Hancock sent a "threatening" message alleging she had made a "big mistake" and added "He's since followed through with threats of legal action." Oakeshott herself has been described as "a journalist who has long made clear her disdain for his lockdown policies" and as an "anti-lockdown campaigner".

== Personal life ==
Oakeshott married Nigel Rosser and has three children. In 2018, she began a relationship with businessman and Reform UK (then The Brexit Party) deputy leader Richard Tice and married him in 2026.

During the COVID-19 pandemic in the United Kingdom, neither Oakeshott nor Tice denied their attendance at a garden barbecue (allegedly against the regulations at the time). Instead, they made reference to testing their eyesight – an apparent signal to an earlier Dominic Cummings scandal.

In January 2025 Oakeshott confirmed she had moved to Dubai in the United Arab Emirates with her children several months earlier, stating the move was prompted by the introduction of VAT on private school fees by the Labour government. Richard Tice confirmed he was splitting time between Dubai and Skegness.

Oakeshott is a supporter of Brexit and has close links to the Conservative Party donor Michael Ashcroft.

She is the sister of Veronica Oakeshott, a professional campaigner for children's and women's charities and Labour candidate for Bicester and Woodstock in the 2024 General Election.

== Bibliography ==
- Watt, Peter (2010). Inside Out: My Story of Betrayal and Cowardice at the Heart of New Labour. Biteback Publishing. ISBN 978-18-4954-038-4.
- Lymbery, Philip; Oakeshott, Isabel (2014). Farmageddon: The True Cost of Cheap Meat. Bloomsbury. ISBN 978-14-0884-644-5.
- Ashcroft, Michael; Oakeshott, Isabel (2015). Call Me Dave. Biteback Publishing. ISBN 978-18-4954-914-1.
- Ghostwriter of Banks, Arron (2016). The Bad Boys of Brexit. Biteback Publishing. ISBN 978-17-8590-182-9.
- Ashcroft, Michael; Oakeshott, Isabel (2018). White Flag? an examination of the UK's defence capability. Biteback Publishing. ISBN 978-17-8590-410-3.
- Ashcroft, Michael; Oakeshott, Isabel (2022). Life Support: The state of the NHS in an age of pandemics. Biteback Publishing. ISBN 978-17-8590-625-1.
- Hancock, Matt; Oakeshott, Isabel (2022). Pandemic Diaries: The inside story of Britain's battle against Covid. Biteback Publishing. ISBN 978-17-8590-774-6.

Media offices
Preceded by Jonathan Oliver	Political Editor of The Sunday Times; 2010–2014	Succeeded by Tim Shipman
