= Garth Owen-Smith =

Namibian environmentalist (1944–2020)

- Born: 22 February 1944
- Died: 11 April 2020 (aged 76); Windhoek, Namibia
- Occupation: Environmentalist
- Partner: Margaret Jacobsohn
- Awards: Goldman Environmental Prize (1993); Global 500 Roll of Honour (1994); The 1997 Knights of the Order of the Golden Ark Award from the Netherlands.

Garth Owen-Smith (22 February 1944 – 11 April 2020) was a South African-Namibian environmentalist. He was awarded the Goldman Environmental Prize in 1993, jointly with Margaret Jacobsohn, for their efforts on conservation of wildlife in Namibia, where illegal hunting was threatening species such as elephants, lions and black rhinos.

Garth Owen-Smith realised local communities are the solution to conservation, not the problem they were at that time believed to be. From this basic philosophical shift, flowed the community-based natural resource management concept, which is at the root of Namibia’s spectacular successes in large-scale conservation.

He was awarded the Global 500 Roll of Honour in 1994.

== Works ==
Garth and his wife are commonly known as outspoken proponents of community preservation, and their collaborative endeavors have established Namibia’s conservation strategy as a blueprint to be admired and replicated throughout the African continent. They jointly established Integrated Rural Development and Nature Conservation (IRDNC) by building on their innovative alliance with community leaders in the 1980s to put an end to the rampant poaching and devastation that was rampant in the northwestern region of Namibia. After stepping down from the co-directorship of IRDNC, Garth and Margie Jacobsohn helped to mentor Conservancy Safaris Namibia, a tourism company owned by five Himba conservancies themselves.

== Awards ==
In 2015 the Prince William Award for Conservation in Africa was awarded to Garth Owen-Smith in recognition of his lifetime contribution alongside Dr. Margaret Jacobsohn to the restoration and conservation of wildlife in Namibia.

The 1997 Knights of the Order of the Golden Ark Award from the Netherlands

In 1993, Owen Smith was awarded the Goldman Environmental Prize which is also known as the "Green Nobel". The award is used to recognize annually the grassroots environmental activists.

He also received the 1994 United Nations Global Environmental 500 Award.
