= Margaret Jacobsohn =

Namibian environmentalist

- Born: Pretoria, South Africa
- Occupation: Environmentalist
- Partner: Garth Owen-Smith
- Parents: Cyril Jacobsohn (father); Dorothy Jacobsohn (mother)
- Relatives: Neil Jacobsohn; Brian Jacobsohn; Bianca Jacobsohn; Jade Jacobsohn; Triston Jacobsohn; Craig Jacobsohn
- Awards: Goldman Environmental Prize (1993); Global 500 Roll of Honour (1994)

Margaret Jacobsohn is a Namibian environmentalist. She was awarded the Goldman Environmental Prize in 1993, jointly with Garth Owen-Smith, for their efforts on conservation of wildlife in rural Namibia.

== Biography ==
She was born in Pretoria, South Africa. She became an NGO worker in community-based natural resource management, in Namibia. Since 1983, in the northeast of Namibia, with Garth Owen-Smith, they have been fighting against the endemic of illegal hunting, which has decimated species such as black rhinos and desert elephants, and for the economic and social development of local populations. Through their actions, poaching is better controlled. Game guards are designated by the rural community. Other natural resources, such as palm trees, thatch grass, plant dyes and water lilies, are monitored. She became interested in semi-nomadic Himba people, devoting a book published in 2003 to them, Himba, nomads of Namibia. They are one of the few African groups that use red ochre, as a full-body make-up called otjize. The Himba originally belonged to the group of the Herero.

She was awarded the Goldman Environmental Prize in 1993, jointly with Garth Owen-Smith, and the Global 500 Roll of Honour in 1994. In 1996, following their initiatives, the Namibian government has adopted what is known as the Communal Areas Conservation Act. This amendment allows rural communities living on state-owned land to manage and benefit from their own wildlife in the same way as farmers on private farms.

== Works ==
- Himba, nomads of Namibia, photographs by Peter and Beverly Pickford, text by Margaret Jacobsohn, 2003.
- Margaret Jocobsohn and her partner are commonly known as the masterminds behind community preservation, and their collaborative endeavors have established Namibia’s conservation strategy as a blueprint to be admired and replicated throughout the African continent. They jointly established Integrated Rural Development and Nature Conservation (IRDNC) by building on their innovative alliance with community leaders in the 1980s to put an end to the rampant poaching and devastation that was rampant in the northwestern region of Namibia. After stepping down from the co-directorship of IRDNC, Garth and Margie Jacobsohn helped to mentor Conservancy Safaris Namibia, a tourism company owned by five Himba conservancies themselves.

== Awards ==
Margaret Jacobsohn was awarded “The Goldman Environmental Prize” in 1993 for their work to assist rural communities to link social and economic development to the conservation of the region’s spectacular.

In 2015, the Prince William Award for Conservation in Africa was awarded to Garth Owen-Smith in recognition of his lifetime contribution alongside Dr. Margaret Jacobsohn to the restoration and conservation of wildlife in Namibia.
