= Pandemic Diaries =

2022 book about the British politician Matt Hancock

Pandemic Diaries: The Inside Story of Britain's Battle Against Covid
- Author: Matt Hancock; Isabel Oakeshott
- Subject: Matt Hancock's tenure as Health Secretary
- Published: London
- Publisher: Biteback Publishing
- Publication date: 6 December 2022
- Publication place: United Kingdom
- ISBN: 9781785907746

Pandemic Diaries: The Inside Story of Britain's Battle Against Covid is a 2022 book by Matt Hancock, a Conservative Party politician, and Isabel Oakeshott, a right-wing political journalist, about Hancock's tenure as Secretary of State for Health and Social Care during the COVID-19 pandemic. It is published by Biteback.

== Synopsis ==
The book was not based on a diary but was written after the fact based on Hancock's recollections as well his records of communications. It dismisses allegations that moving patients into care homes caused deaths arguing that the staff in care homes were the vector of disease. The book is critical of Dominic Cummings.

== Publication and reception ==
In April 2022, it was announced that Hancock would publish his diaries during the COVID-19 pandemic called Pandemic Diaries with Biteback Publishing, cowritten by Isabel Oakeshott. The royalties were planned to be donated to NHS charities. The book was to be released in December 2022.

Reviews comment that the book presented too positive an image, making Hancock seem unduly prescient with the benefit of hindsight, arguing there may be elements of revisionism.

Gaby Hinsliff reviewing in The Guardian said that there were kernels of truth about how politicians make decisions in the account but comments on how the book was written with the benefit of hindsight, allowing Hancock to make himself seem prescient. Rod Dacombe writing in the i said that was absurd and devoid of literary flair. Adam Wagner, writing in Prospect magazine, said that the book had a focus on score settling and self-aggrandisation but that there were some genuine revelations, noting that more will be known when the UK Covid-19 Inquiry reports. Wagner argues Hancock's removal of exceptions for protest from proposed lockdown regulations on the grounds that protests could undermine public trust in measures and his criticism of protestors in the book are suggestive that protests were banned based on the political views of protestors, which Wagner thinks would likely constitute government overreach.

== WhatsApp messages ==
Oakeshott leaked some of the private WhatsApp messages she had access to in a Daily Telegraph article published in February 2023. One message from April 2020 suggests Hancock told aides that professor Chris Whitty had done "an "evidence review" and recommended "testing of all going into care homes, and segregation whilst awaiting result". Hancock allegedly stated this was a "good positive step". Later, Hancock allegedly stated he would rather avoid a commitment to test all people going into care homes from the community and "just commit to test & isolate ALL going into care from hospital". A spokesman for Hancock said, "These stolen messages have been doctored to create a false story that Matt rejected clinical advice on care home testing".
