= James Wharton =

James Wharton may refer to:

- James Wharton, Baron Wharton of Yarm (born 1984), British politician
- James Wharton (author) (born 1987), author and LGBT activist
- James Wharton (boxer) (1813–1856), English boxer
- James Wharton (cricketer) (born 2001), English cricketer
- James Wharton (racing driver), Australian racing driver
- James Edward Wharton (1894–1944), United States Army officer
- J. Ernest Wharton (1899–1990), U.S. Representative from New York
