= Farmageddon (book) =

2014 book by Philip Lymbery and Isabel Oakeshott

- Author: Philip Lymbery; Isabel Oakeshott
- Publisher: Bloomsbury
- Publication date: 2014
- ISBN: 978-1-40884-644-5
- OCLC: 900181396

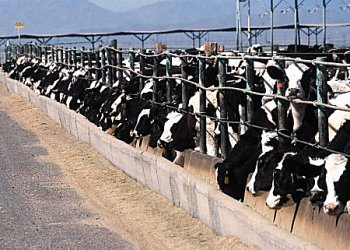
A dairy concentrated animal feeding operation

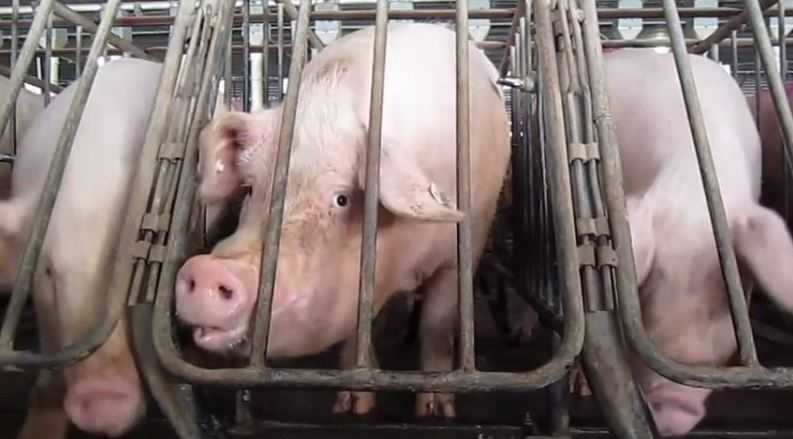
A sow will often stay in a gestation crate for the four-month period of her pregnancy.

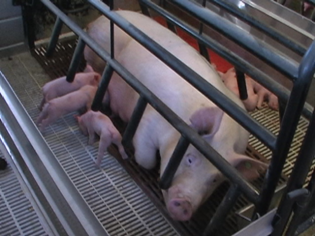
A nursing sow in a farrowing crate.

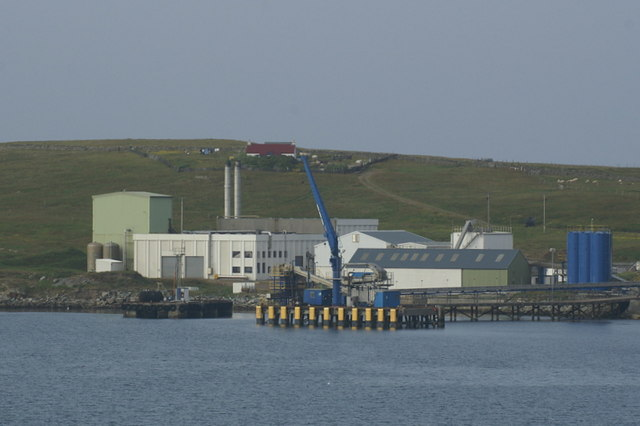
Fish meal factory

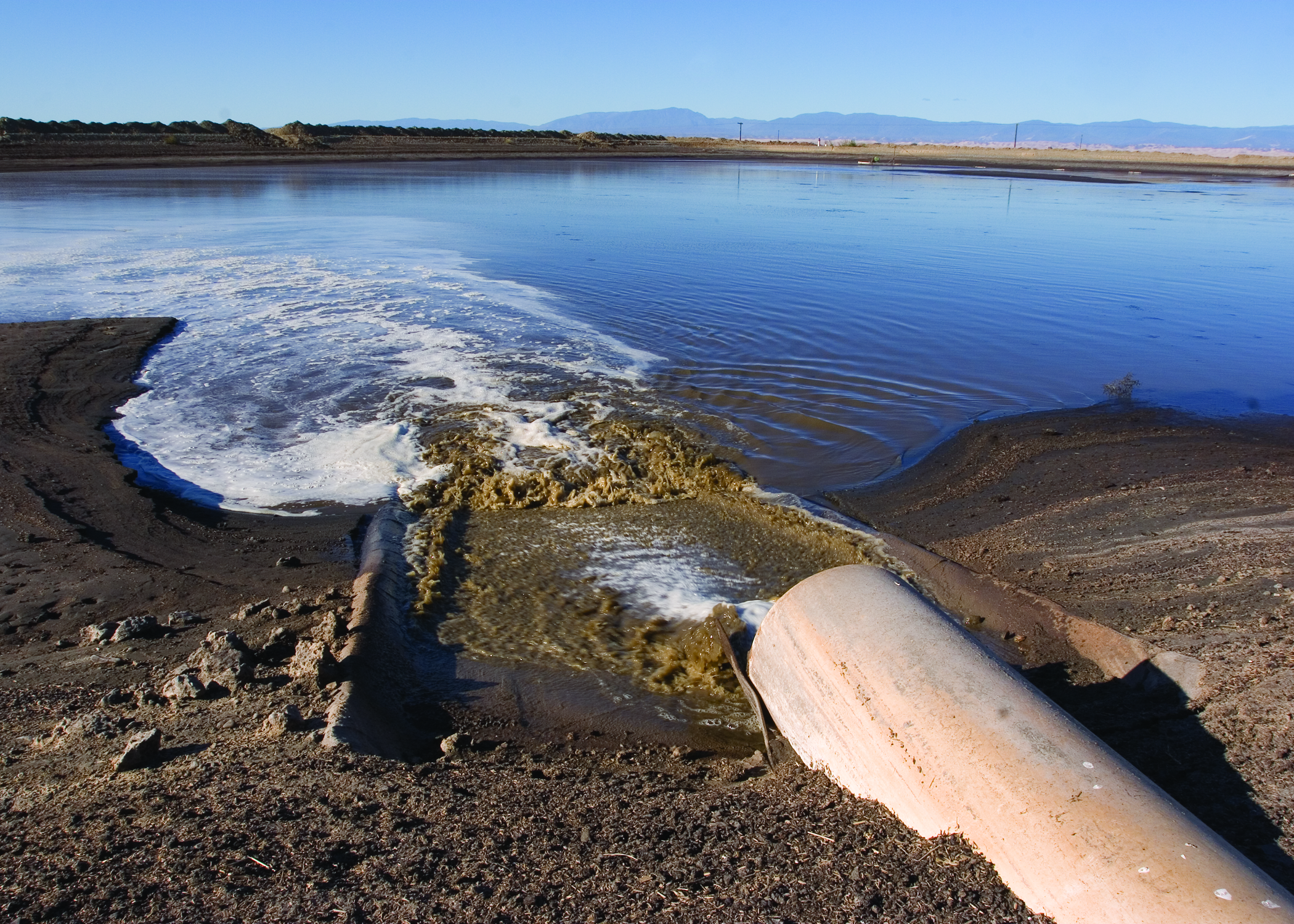
Manure lagoon in California

Farmageddon: The True Cost of Cheap Meat is a 2014 non-fiction book by Philip Lymbery and Isabel Oakeshott. It surveys the effects of industrial livestock production and industrial fish farming around the world. The book is the result of Lymbery's investigations for which he travelled the world over three years. Isabel Oakeshott is the political editor of The Sunday Times, Lymbery is CEO of Compassion in World Farming. The book was published by Bloomsbury.

== Synopsis ==
The thesis examined in the book is that globalised production chains of industrialised agricultural systems negatively affect farmed animals, human health, the countryside, rivers and oceans, biodiversity in rainforests and many of the world's poorest people. The authors seek to shed light on the conditions in intensive agriculture which, according to them, often differ from the image that the industry wants to sell to the public. Intensification in animal farming goes along with a growing demand of cropland to grow animal feed – factory farming is thus not a means to save space. They argue consequently that to feed the world population factory farming is not the solution but a threat, not least since more than a third of the world's arable harvests are being used to supply farmed animals. According to the book the consumer price of cheap meat does not include the overall costs of industrial meat production.

The reader follows Lymbery's journey from his start in California's Central Valley. There he finds dairies where 10,000 cows can be milked at once. He travels to enormous piggeries in China and visits the fishmeal industry of Peru, which converts millions of tonnes of anchovies to fishmeal for supplying the livestock industry with feed. In Taiwan he visits a farm (labelled "organic") where 300,000 laying hens are being starved and held in batteries. A visit is paid to the Chesapeake Bay in Virginia, US where he finds the marine ecosystem impacted by waste from the poultry industry. The author talks to a community in Mexico in an area dominated by pig sheds. There he documents a lake of effluent and air and water pollution, and discusses the outbreak of swine flu.

One chapter of Farmageddon is dedicated to the question "What happened to the vet?" Lymbery says that veterinarians work in an industry with an "inbuilt flaw". He states that veterinarians often comply with the industrialization of animals, for example in the prophylactic use of antibiotics which are applied in the mass production of animals, eggs and milk instead of demanding a different (pasture-based) agricultural system. According to Lymbery, veterinarians should not support systems that are "inherently bad for animal welfare", which allegedly is the case in "mass production of broiler chickens, caged production of eggs, the large-scale permanent housing of dairy cows (so-called mega dairies) and highly intensive pig production where mothering pigs are kept in confinement where they can't turn around for weeks at a time".

In order to prevent Farmageddon the authors come up with suggestions for consumers, policy makers and farmers: Consumers should eat less meat. Fish should be fed to people rather than converted into fishmeal. Animals should be fed with grass and animal farming should be a pasture-based system. These changes would save resources by reducing the competition of humans and animals for food and land.

== Table of contents ==
The book is divided into the following sections:

- I Rude Awakenings (chapters 1-2)
- II Nature (chapters 3-6)
- III Health (chapters 7-8)
- IV Muck (chapters 9-10)
- V Shrinking Planet (chapters 11-13)
- VI Tomorrow's Menu (chapters 14-19)

The following is a list of chapter titles:

1. California Girls: a vision of the future?
2. Henpecked: the truth behind the label
3. Silent Spring: the birth of farming's chemical age
4. Wildlife: the great disappearing act
5. Fish: farming takes to the water
6. Animal Care: what happened to the vet?
7. Bugs 'n' drugs: the threat to public health
8. Expanding Waistlines: food quality takes a nose-dive
9. Happy as a Pig: tales of pollution
10. Southern Discomfort: the rise of the industrial chicken
11. Land: how factory farms use more, not less
12. Thicker than Water: draining rivers, lakes and oil wells
13. Hundred-dollar Hamburger: the illusion of cheap food
14. GM: feeding people or factory farms?
15. China: Mao's mega-farm dream comes true
16. Kings, Commoners and Supermarkets: where the power lies
17. New Ingredients: rethinking our food
18. The Solution: how to avert the coming food crisis
19. Consumer Power: what you can do

== Reception ==
Tristram Stuart wrote in a review for The Guardian that although he is critical towards the "orthodoxy that large-scale farms and industrial agricultural technology are inherently wrong", "this catalogue of devastation will convince anyone who doubts that industrial farming is causing ecological meltdown".

== See also ==
- We are fed up
