= The Left's Jewish Problem =

2016 book by Dave Rich

The Left's Jewish Problem: Jeremy Corbyn, Israel and Anti‑Semitism
- First edition
- Author: Dave Rich
- Language: English
- Genre: Non-fiction
- Publisher: Biteback Publishing
- Publication date: 2016

The Left's Jewish Problem: Jeremy Corbyn, Israel and Anti‑Semitism is a 2016 book by Dave Rich. The book argues that new antisemitism is "masked as anti-Zionism" in left-wing politics.

Rich began the book as a doctoral thesis at Birkbeck, University of London, with his studies funded by his employer, the Community Security Trust.

The work traces the origins of contemporary left-wing antisemitic and anti-Israel rhetoric, including its presence in the British Labour Party, to the early 1970s. Rich cites figures like Peter Hain and Louis Eaks of the Young Liberals, who described Zionism as a colonialist and imperialist project to impose Israeli apartheid on the Palestinian people. Rich argues that anti-Zionism has evolved into a form of antisemitism masked as political critique.

== Reception ==
The book received mixed reviews. Philip Spencer, Professor of Holocaust and Genocide Studies at Kingston University, in reviewing the book for the Britain Israel Communications and Research Centre, accuses the left of inverting reality to blame Jews, "the victims of the most murderous racism, were now the real racists, inverting the Holocaust." Nick Cohen described the book as an "authoritative history of left antisemitism but that "If Rich has a fault, it is that as a rational historian, he cannot speculate on the psychological appeal of left antisemitism" Leslie Wagner described it as "an important one that should be read by all those seeking to understand the New Left’s obsession with anti-Zionism and its inability to recognize, let alone deal with, its own antisemitism" and Benjamin Ramm wrote that "...as a guide to a contemporary malady that is undermining the integrity of the left, Rich’s book is essential reading"

Adam Sutcliffe, reviewing the book in Patterns of Prejudice, says that Rich's criticism of Jewish Voice for Labour does not give "a fair-minded consideration of the perspectives of these Jews and their supporters". He also states that Rich fails to "set these issues within a comparative context. This reflects a wider lack of proportionality in current debates on prejudice in British politics" while also making exaggerations.
