= Dave Rich =

British activist

Dave Rich is a British activist who is Head of Policy at the Community Security Trust and is a leading expert on left-wing antisemitism, according to The Jewish Chronicle. He is an associate research fellow at the Pears Institute for the Study of Antisemitism, where he completed his PhD.

Rich's first book, published in 2016, The Left's Jewish Problem: Jeremy Corbyn, Israel and Anti‑Semitism, began as his doctoral dissertation.

He has since written Everyday Hate: How Antisemitism Is Built Into Our World – And How You Can Change It, published in 2023 to largely positive reception. Writing for The Guardian, Natasha Walter wrote that "Rich’s most precious contribution to the current debate is undoubtedly the line that he draws from historical antisemitism to the crazy conspiracy theories of today. These theories, which put Jewish bankers at the heart of an oppressive global elite, are not only threatening Jews – they are threatening everyone’s hope of making progress towards a more sustainable and equal world." Stephen Bush, writing for the Financial Times, described the book as “brilliantly thorough, data-driven and at times very witty”.

== Bibliography ==
- Rich, Dave (2016). The Left's Jewish Problem - Jeremy Corbyn, Israel and Anti-Semitism. London: Biteback Publishing. ISBN 978-1785901201.
  - Rich, Dave (2018). The Left's Jewish Problem - Jeremy Corbyn, Israel and Anti-Semitism (Updated ed.). London: Biteback Publishing. ISBN 978-1785904271.
- Rich, Dave (2023). Everyday Hate: How Antisemitism Is Built Into Our World – And How You Can Change It. London: Biteback Publishing. ISBN 978-1785907906.
