= Michael Ashcroft =

British-Belizean businessman, pollster and politician (born 1946)

The Right Honourable The Lord Ashcroft KCMG PC
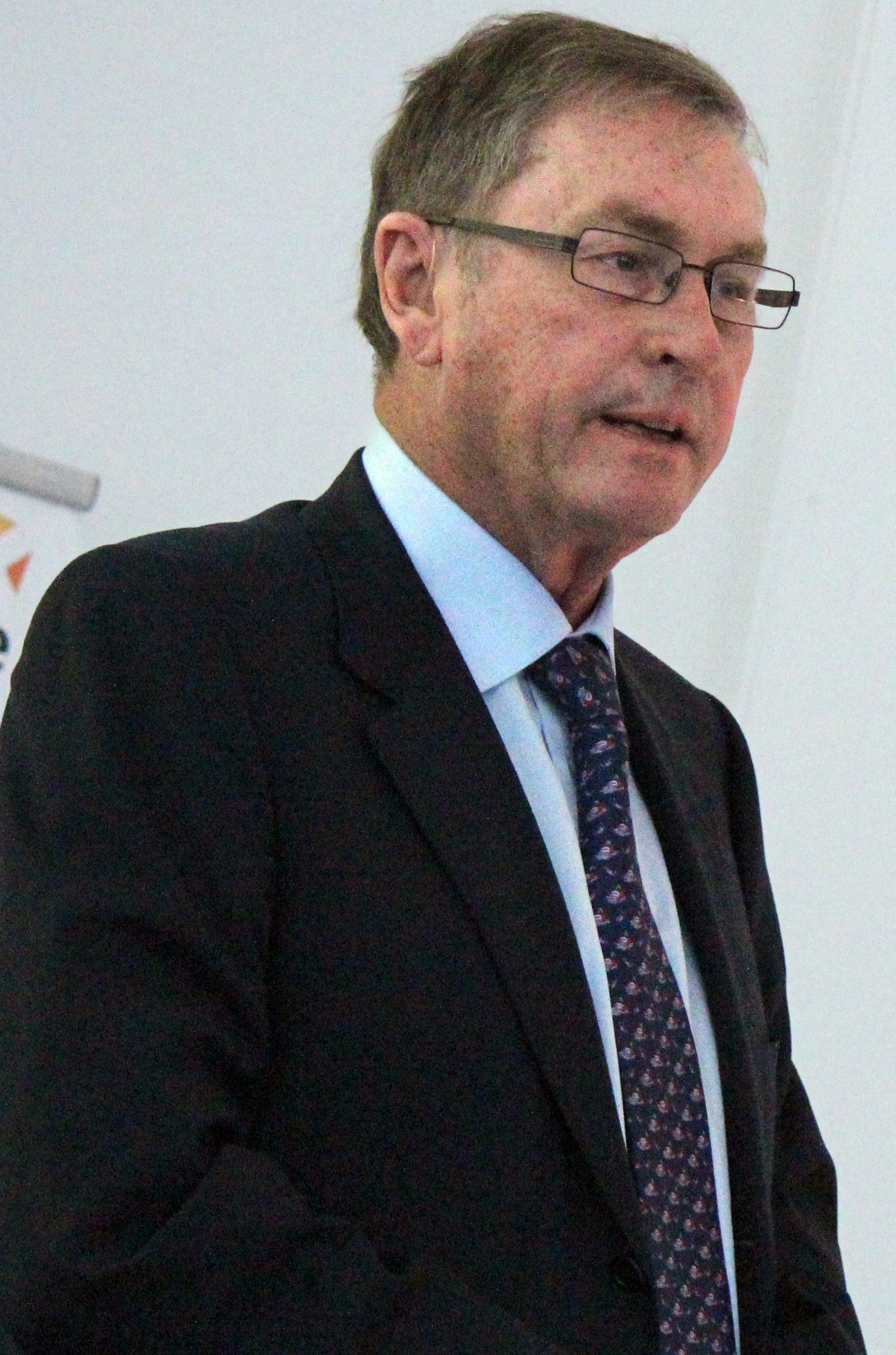
- Ashcroft in 2015

Member of the House of Lords
- Lord Temporal
- Life peerage 20 October 2000 – 3 April 2015

Personal details
- Born: Michael Anthony Ashcroft; 4 March 1946 (age 80) Chichester, West Sussex, England
- Citizenship: British; Belizean
- Party: Conservative
- Spouses: Wendy Burrell (m. 1972, div. 1984) Susan Anstey (m. 1986)
- Children: 3
- Education: Norwich School; Royal Grammar School, High Wycombe
- Alma mater: Anglia Ruskin University
- Occupation: Businessman, politician
- Known for: Hawley Goodall; ADT; British Car Auctions; Flooved

Michael Anthony Ashcroft, Baron Ashcroft, KCMG, PC (born 4 March 1946) is a British-Belizean businessman, pollster and politician. He is a former deputy chairman of the Conservative Party. Ashcroft founded Michael A. Ashcroft Associates in 1972 and was the 132nd richest person in the UK, as ranked by the Sunday Times Rich List 2021, with an estimated fortune of £1.257 billion.

He was created a life peer in 2000, and sat on the Conservative benches of the House of Lords until resigning in 2015. The Cabinet Office stated that he would take up permanent residence in the UK for tax purposes, but it was reported a decade later that he had not done so.

Ashcroft holds dual British and Belizean nationality, and is a belonger of the Turks and Caicos Islands.

== Early life and education ==
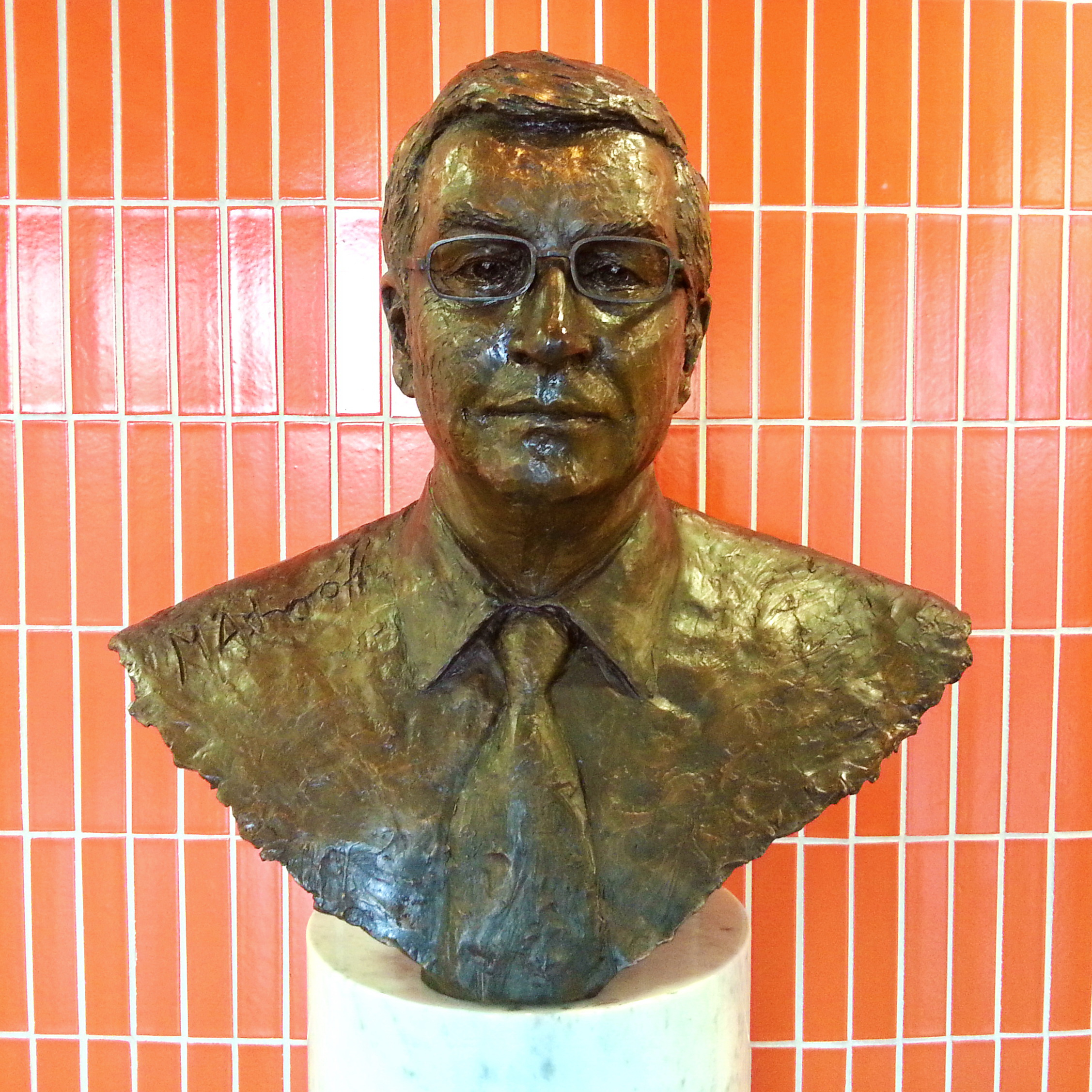
Ashcroft's bust in the lobby of the Lord Ashcroft Building at the business school of Anglia Ruskin University in Cambridge, from where he earned a Higher National Diploma in business studies.

Michael Anthony Ashcroft was born in Chichester, West Sussex. His father, Eric, was a British colonial civil servant; Ashcroft spent some of his early years in British Honduras (now Belize) and Malawi.

He was educated at Norwich School, Royal Grammar School, High Wycombe, and Mid-Essex Technical College (now Anglia Ruskin University), where he obtained a Higher National Diploma in Business studies.

== Business career ==
Following a period in Belize after completing his education, Ashcroft returned to hitchhike around Europe, and then for a short period of time became the manager of a rock and roll band.

In 1967, Ashcroft joined Carreras Tobacco as a management trainee. He left Carreras in 1969, joining Pritchard Services Group, a cleaning and business services company, after several months unemployed. In 1972, at the age of 26, he started his own business, Michael A. Ashcroft Associates, which he used to launch several profitable acquisitions.

=== Acquisitions and divestments ===
Ashcroft's first acquisition was Uni-Kleen—a loss-making cleaning company with 1,000 employees, which he purchased for just £1 in 1974, with a £15,000 bank loan (equivalent to £100,000 in 2025). He worked to turn the company around, selling it just three years later for £1.3 million.

On exiting Uni-Kleen in 1977, his next purchase was Hawley Goodall, another poorly performing company, this time in camping equipment manufacture. Ashcroft used Hawley to make a series of acquisitions, transforming the company into a business services group, ranging from janitorial services for hospitals and offices, to car auction services, and later with a focus on the security services industry. Through the sale of the car auctions division to the fast-expanding British Car Auctions (BCA), he formed a lifelong friendship with David Wickins, whom he would later help take a majority stake in Lotus Cars, as well as provide finance for other joint-ventures. By 1981, Hawley had made its first acquisitions in the United States, and its total revenues had grown to $27 million.

By early 1983, Hawley had built up a 20% stake in pharmaceutical packaging manufacturer Cope Allman. Ashcroft offered to increase his stake to 29.9%, just below the 30% level at which a formal bid for the entire company must be launched. Ashcroft and Cope Allman fought bitterly over the purchase share price and current holdings, with Cope Allman reporting Ashcroft and Wickins to the Takeover panel, after discovering that BCA had built up a 13.5% in the company. But the takeover panel found that Ashcroft and Wickins were operating independently, so Hawley was able to increase its holding to 29.9%. At this point the combined holdings of Hawley and BCA in Cope Allman amounted to 43.5%, giving them the power to introduce sweeping changes without launching a full bid. Cope Allman was eventually sold to an MBO backed by Hawley and financed by Bain Capital, and then sold to Bowater in 1992 in a complex swap of assets with ADT/Hawley.

In 1985 Ashcroft and Wickins bought car sales dealership Henlys Group via a Canadian-registered company, Mipec. Controlled by Ashcroft's Hawley Goodall, Henlys was merged with the already-owned funeral hearse maker Coleman Milne to form a motoring division. In 1989, Hawley Goodall sold its motoring division consisting of Henlys and Coleman Milne to the Plaxton Group, the bus and coach manufacturer based in Scarborough, North Yorkshire.

1987 was a key year for Hawley. In the early part of the year, it bought Crime Control Inc. based in Indianapolis, for $50 million, placing the company in fourth place in the U.S. security market. Later in the year it bought ADT Security Services, the largest electronic security company in the United States. This purchase transformed Hawley into the leading security services business in the United States, and resulted in the majority of its revenues coming from the North American market. As a result of the acquisition, Bermuda-registered Hawley changed its name to ADT Inc. and decided to refocus its business around security services. At the end of 1987, the company sold its North American-based facility services business to Denmark's ISS A/S.

In 1987, Ashcroft bought out the existing shareholders of Wickins' BCA via Hawley Goodall. Based at Blackbushe Airport to allow Wickins access to his treasured aviation division, which flew both Jet Ranger helicopters and Beechcraft King Air turbo prop aircraft, Ashcroft, who has a disliking for such flippant expenditure, immediately sold off the aircraft. Wickins joined the board of Hawley Goodall, remaining there until the Tyco takeover. He retired from BCA in 1990. In 1995, to allow for the Tyco transaction, the group decided to divest itself of BCA. The residual North American arm was sold to trade buyers, while the European arm was sold to a consortium of some 40 private investors, including Ashcroft via his Belize-based investment company. In September 2006, BCA was bought by the UK-based investment banking arm of private bank Samuel Montagu & Co., a division of HSBC, personally netting Ashcroft over £200 million.

In 1997, ADT was sold by a reverse takeover to US conglomerate Tyco International for $6.7 billion, allowing Tyco to become tax-efficient.

Ashcroft disposed of large amounts of the Tyco stock which he had acquired as a result of the sale of ADT, stating that he needed the capital to diversify into other things and that he never retained a substantial stake in any enterprise which he did not control. Ashcroft nevertheless continued as a non-executive director of Tyco, a role he still held in 2002 when Tyco CEO Dennis Kozlowski was arrested in New York in connection with personal tax offences. Unease had already been expressed at Tyco at some of Kozlowski's corporate decisions and Ashcroft was amongst the directors who appointed lawyer David Boies to investigate irregularities in the company.

=== Belize and cross holdings ===
Ashcroft has close business and other connections with the Commonwealth country of Belize, and served as the country's ambassador to the United Nations between 1998 and 2000. In 2009, the Prime Minister of Belize Dean Barrow told its parliament:

Ashcroft is an extremely powerful man. His net worth may well be equal to Belize's entire GDP. He is nobody to cross.

Barrow also warned David Cameron that relations with the United Kingdom would be damaged if Ashcroft were given a senior position in government. In 1984 Ashcroft formed Belize Holdings (BHI).

In 1987, BHI led the formation of Belize Bank Holdings (BBH), which took control of Belize Bank from the Royal Bank of Canada. Belize Bank has become the country's largest financial institution, controlling some 50 per cent of the market. BBH developed local and international interests in facilities services, finance and telecommunications. Belize Bank itself formerly held a majority stake in Belize Telemedia Limited (BTL), until it was nationalised by the Government of Belize.

=== Other business activities ===
Ashcroft also has significant interests in the following companies quoted on the Alternative Investment Market: Restore plc, WeAre20:20 and Impellam Group.

Having attempted a takeover of Corporate Services Group in 1999, in June 2006 he increased his stake to 28.5%, prompting speculation that he might make an offer for the remaining shares in the company. In May 2008 the merger of Carlisle Group and Corporate Services Group to form Impellam Group was announced.

In September 2007, Ashcroft agreed to the sale of AIM listed cleaning services supplier OneSource. Based mainly in the United States, it was the old North American cleaning business of ISS that Ashcroft had sold to them when refocusing Hawley in 1987. Bought in 1997 for $1, he agreed the sale of the company at a value of £179m.

In March 2006, he became the major shareholder in English professional football club Watford, owning up to 42% of the club's shares. In September 2006, he accepted a bid for British Car Auctions (BCA) worth £450m, netting him a personal gain of £200m.

Ashcroft has a 72.3% stake in English sparkling wine producer Gusbourne, which he acquired in 2013 for £7 million.

== Personal life ==
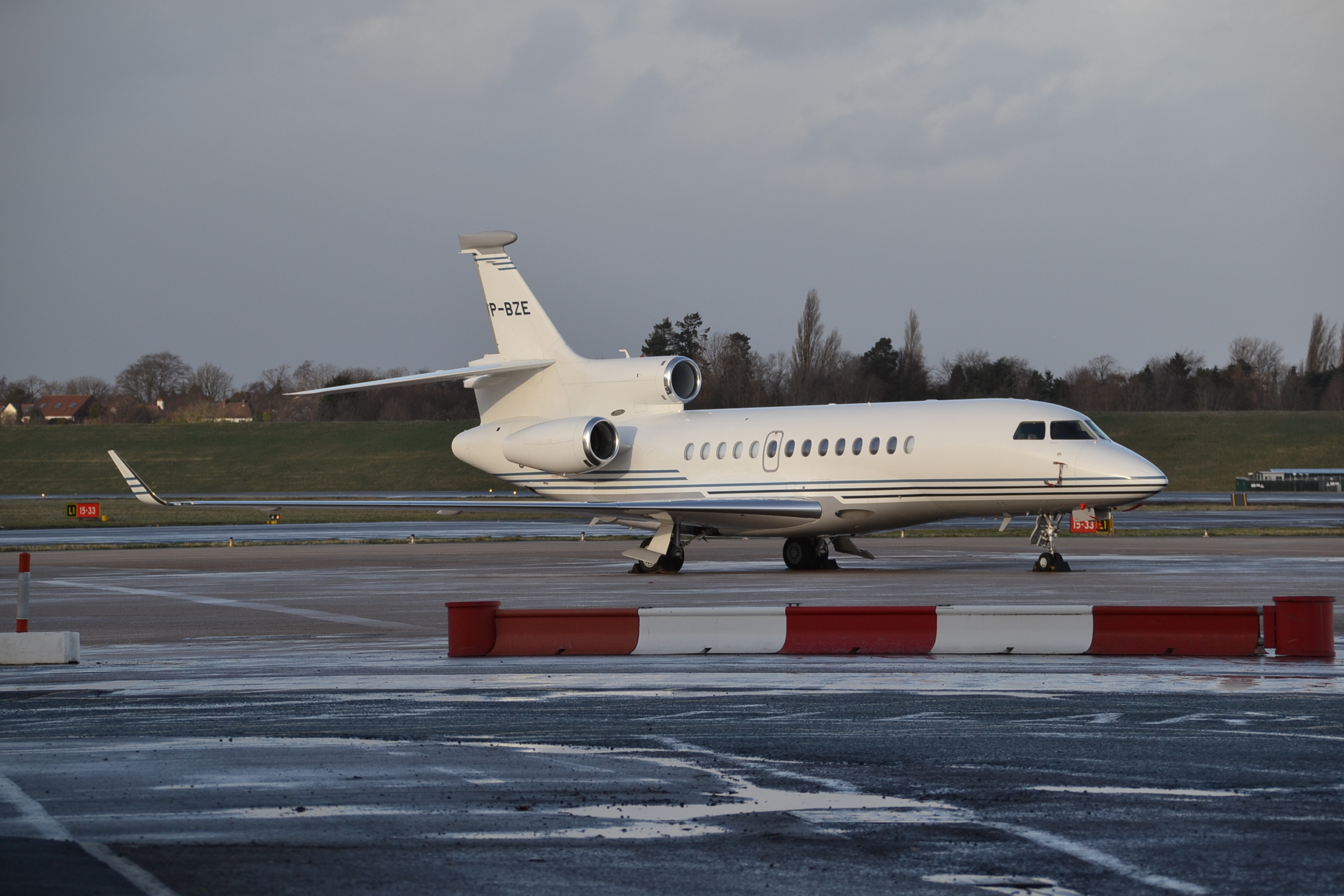
VP-BZE, Ashcroft's private jet, at Birmingham Airport in 2014

In April 1972, Ashcroft married Wendy Mahoney. They had two sons and one daughter; the marriage was dissolved in 1984. His second marriage in 1986 was to Susan Anstey. The couple have homes in London, Maidenhead in Berkshire, and Belize.

Ashcroft owns a Dassault Falcon 7X, registration VP-BZE, via his Bermudian registered company, Flying Lion. On 27 December 2017, while parked at the Malta International Airport, the plane careened off the apron, smashed into a fence and a road before crashing into an office building. The incident is believed to have occurred after the plane's wheel chocks were blown away due to strong winds. No injuries were reported but the plane suffered extensive damage.

He owns two 150-foot (46 m) yachts, both registered in Belize:

- Lady M – built in the Netherlands
- Atlantic Goose – built originally for Sir Donald Gosling as Brave Goose in 1987 by Tough Brothers of Teddington, on the River Thames.

== Politics ==
=== Conservative Party ===
In the UK, he was a major donor to and Treasurer of the Conservative Party from 1998 to 2001, under William Hague. His tenure was marked by a number of controversies: he was seen to pay little UK income tax because of his domicile in Belize, and he was at the centre of a debate about openness and accountability of political funding. Unsubstantiated speculation about his business affairs was concluded when he pursued a libel action against The Times. This was settled on 9 December 1999, when The Times issued a front-page statement saying "The Times is pleased to confirm that it has no evidence that Mr Ashcroft or any of his companies have ever been suspected of money-laundering or drug-related crimes... Litigation between the parties has been settled to mutual satisfaction, with each side bearing its own costs."

In 2004, he clashed with Conservative leader Michael Howard when he offered a £2m donation on the condition that it should go to his specified candidates rather than into general Conservative Central Office funds. Ashcroft stated in 2005: "I much prefer to be involved, to make sure that my investment is wisely placed."

In December 2005, he was appointed Deputy chairman of the Conservative Party. During the "Cash for Peerages" controversy, on 31 March 2006 Ashcroft was named by the Conservative Party as having lent it £3.6m.

Significant donations made to the Conservative Party by Bearwood Corporate Services, a company controlled by Ashcroft, have also come under scrutiny. The trading status of the company, and thus the validity of donations totalling £5.1m between 2003 and 2008, is unclear and became the subject of an investigation by the Electoral Commission begun in October 2008. Both Labour MPs and the Prime Minister had called for the process to be concluded in time for the next general election, due by mid-2010. Liberal Democrat Lord Oakeshott stated: "Democracy is in danger if Lord Ashcroft has been pouring millions into Conservative campaigns through an offshore pipeline from a Caribbean tax haven." However, in March 2010 sources from the Electoral Commission described the donations as being "legal and permissible".

On 1 March 2010, Ashcroft said that he was not domiciled in the UK for tax purposes. On 4 March 2010 the House of Commons Public Administration select committee decided to hold a "special one-off inquiry" into Ashcroft's peerage and his tax affairs. The committee's three Conservative MPs are said to have refused to take part in the inquiry.

In September 2010, Ashcroft announced he would be stepping down as Deputy Chairman of the Conservative Party. His resignation came as he published Minority Verdict, his critical analysis of why the Conservative Party failed to gain an overall majority in the general election; leading to the Conservatives forming the Coalition government with the Liberal Democrats. He was replaced by the MP Michael Fallon.

In 2012, The Daily Telegraph credited Ashcroft, owner of both the ConservativeHome and PoliticsHome website with "stopping the Coalition working", by moving policy on Europe, welfare, education and taxation to the right. Prior to the 2010 election, Cameron gave Ashcroft a large office and a significant role in the election campaign but he received no reward in the form of ministerial job. Although claiming not to exercise editorial control, Ashcroft, a "brutal critic of the Coalition from the start" has established "megaphone presence" in the online media and the Lib Dems are described as blocking economic and welfare system reforms. The parties have separate and contradictory agendas and—as exemplified by Michael Gove's education reforms intended for Tory ears only'-do not even consult each other. Cameron's philosophy of liberal conservatism has been destroyed by "coordinated attacks on the Coalition." Although voters may have liked Coalition government, "the two parties are no longer trying to pretend that they are governing together" and Cameron seems unwilling to celebrate midterm successes. "Ashcroft, who has been against it all along, looks like getting his way."

Ashcroft became the largest donor to the Conservative's candidate for the 2021 London mayoral election. Of the £255,000 raised by the candidate, Shaun Bailey, Ashcroft donated £100,000.

In 2022, he published a book about the wife of the then Prime Minister Boris Johnson, Carrie Symonds, to whom he attributed a negative influence on her husband.

==== Peerage ====
On 31 March 2000, Ashcroft was appointed as a life peer, and the title Baron Ashcroft, of Chichester in the County of West Sussex was gazetted on 20 October 2000. He was nominated by Conservative party leader William Hague on the condition that he became a UK resident, although at the beginning of 2010 he announced his "non-domiciled" tax status. Ashcroft had announced that he intended to take the title "Baron Ashcroft of Belize", a suggestion that infuriated his political opponents. He later said this had been a joke, and his title was created as simply "Baron Ashcroft".

On 31 March 2015, the day after the prorogation of Parliament ahead of the 2015 general election, he announced his resignation from the House of Lords with immediate effect, stating he would continue in politics.

=== Belize ===
Ashcroft allegedly gave the People's United Party in Belize $1m when it was in opposition. During its period in power, it introduced laws that are claimed by opponents and media commentators to be financially advantageous to Ashcroft.

=== Australia ===
Ashcroft has become a significant figure in Australian politics having been identified as the single largest individual donor to any Australian political party during the 2004–05 financial year. The Australian Electoral Commission reported in February 2006 that Ashcroft (who gave his address as "House of Lords, Westminster, London") had donated $1 million to the Liberal Party in September 2004, shortly before the 2004 federal election. It was, at the time, the biggest single private donation in Australian political history. He also made donations of $250,000 to the party on 28 July 2010 and in September 2013.

=== UK electoral polling ===
Developing from work he did for the Conservative Party in his Deputy chairman role, since 2010. Lord Ashcroft has been a major independent public pollster of British political opinion. This has included polling at constituency level, which is rare in British psephology. Lord Ashcroft Polls' results are freely available online and are frequently discussed in various media outlets.

== Charity and philanthropy ==
In 2013, Ashcroft stated that he has given tens of millions of pounds to good causes over the years. In May 2013, he pledged to donate more than half of his money to good causes, and became a signatory of The Giving Pledge.

=== Anti-crime supporter ===
Ashcroft is the founder and chairman of Crimestoppers.

On 12 October 2009, Ashcroft pledged NZ$50,000 for the safe return of two-year-old toddler Aisling Symes. Aisling had gone missing a week earlier in West Auckland, New Zealand.

In 2022, Ashcroft issued a £100,000 reward in the search for the gunman who killed Olivia Pratt-Korbel in Liverpool.

=== Education ===
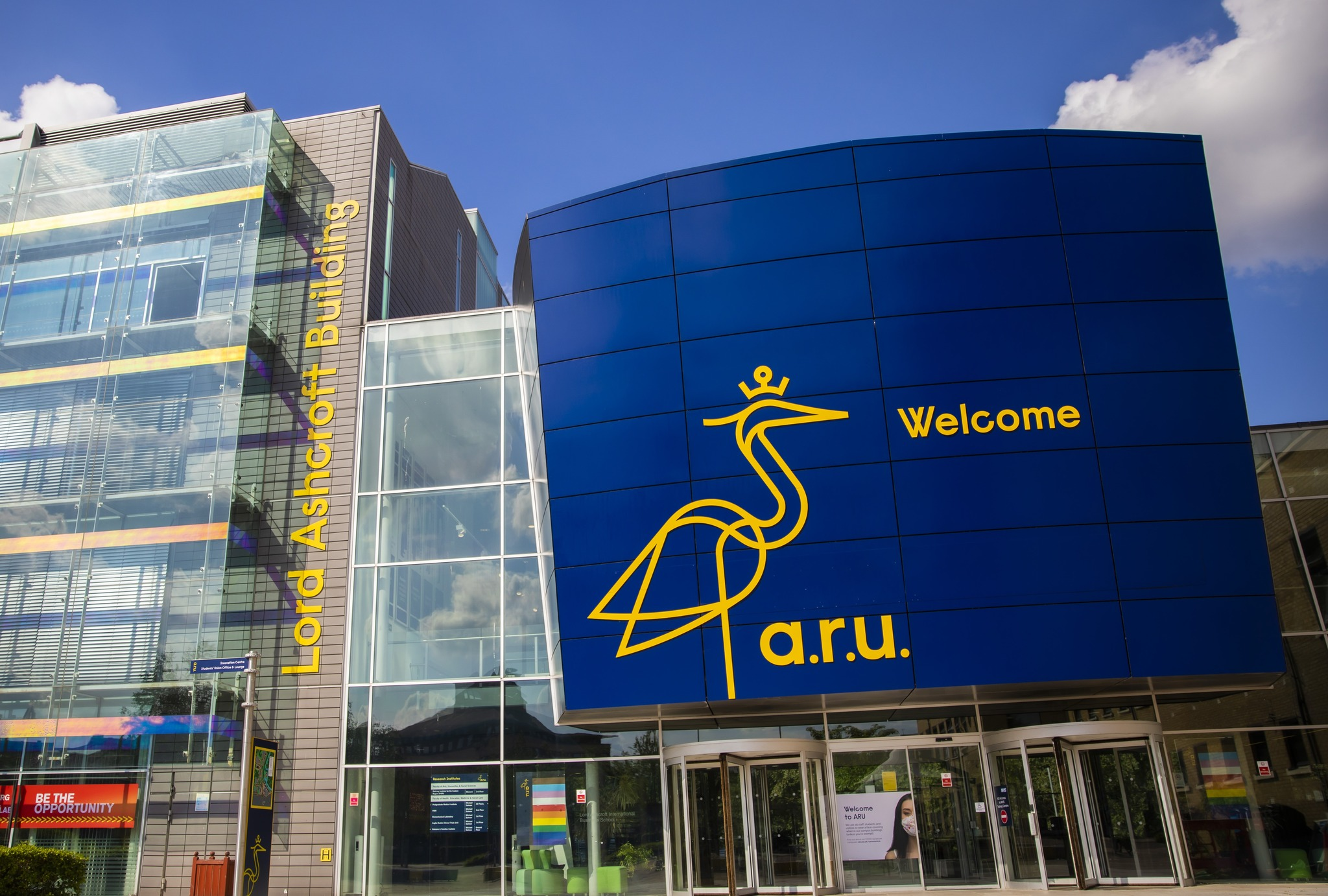
Anglia Ruskin University's Lord Ashcroft Building, opened in 2003 in Chelmsford by HRH Prince Edward, Earl of Wessex. It houses the Faculty of Business and Law.

Ashcroft was the Chancellor of Anglia Ruskin University from November 2001 to January 2021. He donated £5 million in 1999 for the university's business school at Chelmsford, formerly called Lord Ashcroft International Business School, and another £5 million gift in 2009 to create a new business school building in Cambridge. Lord Ashcroft Building in Chelmsford was inaugurated in 2003 and Lord Ashcroft Building in Cambridge was opened in 2011.

He is the sponsor of Ashcroft Technology Academy in Wandsworth, a state secondary school within the English academy programme.

He became the main backer, along with Stephan Shakespeare (CEO and co-Founder of YouGov) of Flooved, an education technology startup.

He has provided a copy of Britain's Treasure Islands to every secondary school in the UK and its overseas territories.

Ashcroft is also an Ambassador for the education and veterans charity SkillForce which, under Chief Executive Ben Slade devised and developed the Prince William Award.

=== Jacob's Ladder on Saint Helena Island ===
Ashcroft funded the 2022 restoration of Jacob's Ladder, a 699-step concrete staircase built into the side of a mountainous valley on Saint Helena Island in the South Atlantic Ocean. A plaque honoring Ashcroft's donation notes it was done in the memory of his father, who had carried him up the entire staircase when Michael was a child.

=== Environmentalist ===
Ashcroft is a whale spotter, through which interest he has financially supported various environmental groups and campaigns. He financially supported the Environmental Investigation Agency, who persuaded him to back a television campaign in six Caribbean countries, aimed at coaxing them to withdraw their support for whaling. The countries had received $16 million (£8 million) a year in fisheries aid from Japan. The campaign coincided with the 2006 International Whaling Commission conference in St Kitts.

=== Military ===
Ashcroft has also supported military causes; in September 2011 he hosted a reception at the House of Lords for the launch of the Felix Fund, the charity for bomb disposal experts and their families.

Ashcroft pledged to donate all of the author's royalties from his book Special Forces Heroes to the Help for Heroes charity, and from his book George Cross Heroes to the Victoria Cross and George Cross Association.

He donated £1 million of the £7 million cost of the Bomber Command Memorial in London's Green Park.

== Victoria Cross collection ==
Ashcroft collects Victoria Crosses, which are awarded for valour and devotion to duty to members of various armed forces. His collection is by far the largest in the world, spanning 128 years from acts of valour at the start of the Crimean War in 1854 to an act of courage during the Falklands War in 1982. He wrote Victoria Cross Heroes to mark the 150th anniversary of the Victoria Cross.

Following the theft of a number of Victoria Crosses awarded to New Zealand servicemen from the Army Museum at Waiouru in late 2007, Ashcroft pledged NZ$200,000 for their return. Those stolen included the VC & Bar of Charles Upham. The medals were recovered three months later and at a presentation in Wellington on 15 April 2008 he pledged a further NZ$200,000 for information leading to the conviction of those responsible for the thefts.

In July 2008, Ashcroft announced a donation of £5 million for a gallery at the Imperial War Museum, where the fifty Victoria Crosses held by the museum are now on display alongside his own collection of more than 200 VCs (and a smaller collection of George Crosses). It was announced that the Lord Ashcroft Gallery will close from 1 June 2025 so the area could be used for galleries "to share more stories of conflicts that are within many of our visitors’ living memory.".

Following the closure of his collection at the Imperial War Museum, in March 2026, Ashcroft announced that his collection would now be housed at the National Army Museum.

== Controversy ==
=== Tax status ===
Ashcroft has been described as a "tax exile", and for a number of years lived in the UK enjoying the controversial non-domiciled tax status. At the time of his ennoblement the Cabinet Office said that Ashcroft would be taking up permanent residence in the UK for tax purposes, an undertaking described in the newspapers as a "pledge" and a "gentleman's agreement", but he did not in fact claim to do so until a decade later, when a change in the law would have required him to quit the Lords, had he not done so.

In 2017 it was revealed following the Paradise Papers leak of offshore investment documents that Lord Ashcroft remained domiciled in Belize despite having claimed to have given up his non-dom tax status in 2010. The documents also showed that between 2000 and 2010, Ashcroft received payments of around £150 million (US$210 million) from an offshore trust in Bermuda, which as a non-dom he did not have to pay taxes on.

=== U.S. DEA leak ===
In 1999, Ashcroft was first nominated by Conservative Party leader and friend William Hague for the Lords. During their investigation, the House of Lords Appointments Commission was fed via the media with certain information, which originated from Jonathan Randel, an intelligence research specialist for the United States Drug Enforcement Administration.

Randel leaked Ashcroft's name as being in the DEA's files, although it later emerged that Ashcroft was one of five million people they routinely had files on. Randel claimed that the DEA was ignoring Ashcroft in its investigation of money laundering, allegations which The Times newspaper later printed on its front page. However, later investigation by various British media sources from information released under the US Freedom of Information Act showed that at no point did the DEA personally investigate Ashcroft.

After his second successful nomination to the Lords and his ascent to the house, Ashcroft sued The Times in the High Court. The two parties eventually reached an out of court agreement which resulted in Rupert Murdoch agreeing to The Times printing a full front page retraction of its allegations. Ashcroft later recounted his own side of the story in his book Dirty Politics, Dirty Times.

=== Business style ===
In 2003, Ashcroft was criticised by a High Court judge, Mr Justice Peter Smith, in Rock (Nominees) Ltd v RCO (Holdings) Plc. Smith condemned Ashcroft's tactics in relation to the takeover of cleaning company RCO by the Danish firm ISS. Smith said,

Euphemistically this practice – which I understand is a not unheard-of practice in the City – is described as "greenmail". The proper word to my mind is blackmail. It is the kind of thing which brings the City into disrepute ... Where matters are dealt with in speculation and profits are made, which are then gathered offshore, when there is no merit and no exposure to the kind of risks associated with companies, that to my mind is not legitimate.

— Justice Peter Smith

Smith went on to say that Ashcroft "was not content with a small £250,000 profit earned in a matter of weeks. He now seeks to extract millions." Ashcroft responded by telling journalists that "being accused of blackmail by a man who states that speculation has no part to play in the City is rather like finding that you are sharing a railway carriage with a drunk. It's best not to take too much notice."

In 2008, The Economist ran an article on the web of loans and court cases surrounding Belize Bank (owned by Ashcroft), a private hospital company called Universal Health Services and the government of Belize. It was alleged that Belize Bank had wrongly appropriated monies sent from the government of Venezuela for housing purposes to settle debts relating to loans to UHS and illegally guaranteed in secret by the Belizean premier.

The Guardian said that sources claimed the bills were paid by a company owned by Ashcroft in Belize, meaning that he did not pay VAT. The newspaper estimated that the total VAT bill could have totalled more than £40,000; however, paying the bill in this way removed the legal obligation to pay VAT.

In 2012, BBC's Panorama programme alleged that Lord Ashcroft continued to control the Caribbean construction company Johnston International after its sale in 1999 until it went bankrupt in 2010, and that he concealed his continuing control. Ashcroft denied he owned Johnston after 1999, though he avoided answering questions about whether he continued to "control" it.

=== Call Me Dave ===
Ashcroft's book Call Me Dave: The Unauthorised Biography of David Cameron, published on 5 October 2015, was criticised by Conservative Party sources for containing content which they classified as untrue. In addition to this, the Prime Minister's office argued that Ashcroft published the book to tarnish David Cameron's reputation in revenge for perceived slights to Ashcroft.

== Honours ==
In the 2000 Birthday Honours, on the advice of the Belizean government, he was appointed Knight Commander of the Order of St Michael and St George (KCMG) "for public service to the community and country" of Belize.

In 1999, he was given the honorary degree of Doctor of the University by Anglia Ruskin University; he would be named chancellor of the university in 2001. He was chancellor for 20 years and made significant contributions to the university.

He was sworn of the Privy Council of the United Kingdom in 2012, entitling him to use the post-nominal letters "PC" for life. In December, he was appointed Knight Grand Cross of the Order of the Holy Trinity by the Crown Council of Ethiopia.

- : Knight Commander, Order of St Michael and St George (2000)
- : Grand Cross, Order of the Holy Trinity (Ethiopia) (2012)

== Books ==
- Dirty politics Dirty times: My fight with Wapping and New Labour, 2005, Biteback, ISBN 9781849540094
- Smell the Coffee: A Wakeup Call for the Conservative Party, 2005, Politico's, ISBN 9781904734109
- Victoria Cross Heroes, 2007, Headline, ISBN 9780755316335. Foreword by the Prince of Wales.
- Special Forces Heroes: Extraordinary True Stories of Daring and Valour, 2009, Headline, ISBN 9780755318087
- Minority Verdict: The Conservative Party, the voters and the 2010 election, 2010, Biteback, ISBN 9781849540827
- George Cross Heroes, 2010, Headline, ISBN 9780755360840
- It's Not You, It's Them: Research to remind politicians what matters, 2012, Biteback, ISBN 9781849544214
- Degrees of Separation: Ethnic minority voters and the Conservative Party, 2012, Biteback, ISBN 9781849544184
- The Armed Forces & Society: The military in Britain through the eyes of Service personnel, employers and the public, 2013, Biteback, ISBN 9781849544252
- Heroes of the Skies, 2013, Headline, ISBN 9780755363902
- Special Ops Heroes, 2014, Headline, ISBN 9781472223968
- Pay Me Forty Quid and I'll Tell You: The 2015 election campaign through the eyes of the voters, with Kevin Culwick, 2015, Biteback, ISBN 9781849549776
- Call Me Dave: The unauthorised biography of David Cameron, with Isabel Oakeshott, 2015, Biteback, (ISBN 9781849549141)
- Well, You Did Ask...: Why the UK voted to leave the EU, with Kevin Culwick, 2016, Biteback, ISBN 9781785901683
- Victoria Cross Heroes Volume II, 2016, Biteback, ISBN 9781785900976
- Jacob's Ladder: The Unauthorised Biography of Jacob Rees-Mogg, 2019, Biteback, ISBN 9781785904875
- Going for Broke: The Rise of Rishi Sunak, 2020, Biteback, ISBN 9781785906374
- First Lady: Intrigue at the Court of Carrie and Boris Johnson, 2022, Biteback, (ISBN 978-1785907500)

== Arms ==
Coat of arms of Michael Ashcroft
Coronet A Coronet of a Baron Crest A Baird's tapir statant Sable gorged with a plain collar attached thereto a line reflexed over the back and ringed Or. Escutcheon Or gutté Sable two barrulets dancetty acute each interlaced with a bar Gules. Supporters On either side a Keel-Billed Toucan Proper. Motto Sleep wid you own eye Badge Two Keel-Billed Toucans volant in saltire their wings addorsed Proper

Orders of precedence in the United Kingdom
Preceded by The Lord Luce	Gentlemen; Baron Ashcroft	Followed by The Lord Best
