= Meat price =

Economics and affordability of meat

The meat price refers to the price of meat.

== Inexpensive meats ==
Inexpensive meat or cheap meat include e.g. fatty cuts of lamb or mutton.

== Factors influencing the price of meat ==
Factors influencing the price of meat include supply and demand, subsidies, hidden costs, taxes, quotas or non-material costs ("moral cost") of meat production. Non-material costs can be related to issues such as animal welfare (e.g. treatment of animals, over-breeding). Hidden costs of meat production can be related to the environmental impact of meat production and to the effect on human health (such as resistant antibiotics). Critics of the meat industry often point to these aspects as a problem.

== See also ==
- Livestock price
- Intensive animal farming
- Organic agriculture
- Local food
- Factory farming divestment
- Food vs. feed
- Fodder
- Wagyu
- Slow food
- Draft animal: multi-role animals
- Meat analogue
- Meat-free days

== Bibliography ==
- Lymbery, Philip. Farmageddon: The True Cost of Cheap Meat, Bloomsbury Publishing, 2014. ISBN 1408846446
