= Restore plc =

British document management company

- Formerly: Mavinwood plc (2004–2010)
- Company type: Public limited company
- Traded as: LSE: RST
- Industry: Support Services Company
- Founded: 2004
- Headquarters: London, England
- Area served: UK
- Key people: Jamie Hopkins (Non-Executive Chairman), Charles Skinner (CEO), Dan Baker (CFO), Susan Davy (Non-Executive Director), Lisa Fretwell (Non-Executive Director), Patrick Butcher (Non-Executive Director)
- Revenue: £275.3m (2024)
- Operating income: £48.8 million (2024)
- Number of employees: >2300 (2024)
- Divisions: Information Management Datashred Technology
- Website: restoreplc.com

Restore plc is a company incorporated in England and Wales. The main country of operation is the United Kingdom. It is an AIM-listed support services company and has three divisions: Information Management, Datashred and Technology.

The Company was floated on AIM in November 2004 and in 2010 the company changed its name to Restore plc.

== History ==
The business was built through a combination of organic and acquisitive growth over a ten year period from 2009 to 2019 under the leadership of Charles Skinner, who rejoined the business as CEO in September 2023. Over this period, the business attracted a strong following from institutional and retail investors and built a reputation for outperforming expectations. Earnings forecasts were generally met or exceeded, driven by a very active M&A strategy, which saw Restore’s revenue increase from under £20m to over £200m. Charles Skinner left the business in March 2019 after ten years as CEO with the records management consolidation strategy largely complete and a sustained period of rapid revenue growth coming to an end.

Charles Bligh joined as CEO in April 2019, refreshed Group-wide branding, expanded the Head Office function and set out ambitious revenue and EBITDA targets, to be supported by a reinvigorated M&A strategy with a particular focus on the opportunity within Technology. He also navigated the challenging COVID period and subsequent inflationary pressures. He resigned in April 2023 as the business underperformed expectations. 2023 results were disappointing, as adjusted earnings per share dropped by 30% despite revenues remaining stable. There were a number of issues, notably Datashred margins being impacted by lower recycled paper pricing, Technology suffering from a cyclical low point in corporate IT spending, and Digital activity declining compared to a strong prior year comp, which had benefited from a number of large contracts.

Charles Skinner returned in September 2023 and has quickly set out new strategic priorities to return the Group to earnings growth and deliver shareholder value after a period of underperformance.

== Notable acquisitions ==
Restore PLC acquired Datacare, based in Upper Heyford, in September 2010, followed by Formsafe. Formsafe had been operating for 25 years with branches in West Sussex and Aberdare, Wales.

In April 2011, Restore plc announced the acquisition of Sargents Logistics and Sargents Archive. Sargents, based in London, were in administration at the time of the acquisition.

Next for Restore plc, in July 2011, they acquired Management Archives of Leeds and then Paterson Document Management of Glasgow in September, followed by Brunswick Document Management of Middlesbrough in November of the same year.

In October 2011, Restore Shred was formed.

Harrow Green was acquired in February 2012, which included a 50% share in Relocom. ROC Relocations was next in May 2012, followed by M&L Document Destruction in August 2012.

Middleton based Archive Solutions signed over their business to Restore plc in October 2012.

In March 2013, Brabners Chaffe Street advised Restore plc on the acquisition of File and Data Storage Limited, and both IT Efficient and Atix of Sittingbourne in Kent were acquired soon after in April of the same year.

In April 2013, Restore plc acquired an additional 33% stake in Relocom, the UK IT relocation business, taking its overall stake to 83%.

Magnum Secure of Spennymoor in the North East of England was acquired in April 2014, and a month later, Filebase of Washington, also in the North East of England, was acquired by Restore plc in 13 days in May 2014.

Also in May 2014, Restore plc acquired Cannon Confidential. The acquisition of Papersafe UK made the news in July 2014.

In October 2014, Restore agreed a deal with Cintas Document Management (UK) Ltd, the UK records management and scanning division of US based Cintas Corporation.

In January 2015, Restore plc announced that it had acquired the business and assets of Ancora Solutions, a document management business, from IPPlus plc.

Having acquired ITP Group holdings in the middle of 2015 Restore were very quick to acquire The Data Imaging and Archiving Company in August 2015, and Lancashire based, Crimson UK was also acquired in the same month.

Chippenham in Wiltshire based Wincanton Records Management sold its records management business, one of the largest of its kind in the UK, to Restore plc in November 2015, and in December 2015, Restore acquired Diamond Relocations, which fit alongside the Harrow Green acquisition.

Restore plc completed its acquisition of Caerphilly-headquartered PHS Data Solutions from Personnel Hygiene Services Limited in August 2016.

In January 2017, Restore announced the acquisition of ID Secured Ltd., which traded as Reisswolf London, from the UK based paper recycling firm Parry & Evans Ltd, and in February 2017 Restore plc then acquired The ITAD Works of Surrey, to sit alongside the IT Efficient acquisition.

In July 2017, the Group acquired the trade and assets of Solutions for Archiving, a Dorset-based records management business for £0.4m in cash. The provisional customer relationships acquired were £0.4m.

In July 2017, the Group also acquired the shredding activities of Banner group for a cash consideration of £0.3m. The provisional customer relationships acquired were £0.3m.

Baxter Confidential of Hampshire was acquired in August 2017 for a cash consideration of £1.4m. Cash of £0.1m was acquired as part of the net assets and the provisional customer relationships acquired were £0.6m and goodwill £1.0m.

The Group then acquired Lombard Recycling Limited and Datashred Limited (together Lombard) for a cash consideration of £2.4m. The provisional customer relationships acquired were £1.1m and goodwill for £1.3m.

In January 2018, Restore plc started the year with the purchase of Scanning Direct of Yorkshire and Papershrink of Peterborough.

May 2018 saw the acquisition of TNT Business Solutions, the Records Management arm of TNT UK Limited.

ORS Ltd, a Southampton-based scanning bureau was next to be acquired, and in August 2018, the Group acquired Spinnaker Waste Management Limited, a Portsmouth-based Waste Electrical and Electronic Equipment (WEEE) and electronic waste recycling for £0.5m.

Function Business Location Ltd, a London-based removal business, was also acquired in 2018, and the start of October saw Safe-Shred UK Ltd acquired. The technology company Green Magnet Ltd was acquired at the end of October 2018. October 2018 also saw the acquisition of scanning business Document Capture co Ltd.

== Corporate responsibility ==
Restore meet recognised business standards and are ISO 9001:2015, 14001, 45001 and 27001 certified.

== Company ==
The Restore plc end of year falls in line with the natural end of year, being 31 December, and their Annual AGM usually takes place in May.
