= Philip Lymbery =

Animal welfare advocate (born 1965)

Philip John Lymbery (born 23 September 1965) is the Global CEO of farm animal welfare charity, Compassion in World Farming International, Visiting Professor at the University of Winchester’s Centre for Animal Welfare, President of Eurogroup for Animals, Brussels, founding Board member of the World Federation for Animals and a Leadership Fellow at St George's House, Windsor Castle.

Lymbery is an author, ornithologist, photographer, naturalist, and animal advocate. He regularly speaks at international events and commentates in the media about the global effects of industrial agriculture (factory farming), including its impact on animal welfare, wildlife, soil and natural resources, biodiversity and climate change, as well as the need for more balanced, regenerative agriculture and sustainable food systems. In March 2021, he was appointed as a United Nations (UN) Food Systems Champion for the 2021 UN Food Systems Summit.

== Career ==
After leaving college, Lymbery volunteered for several months at an RSPB reserve, Titchwell Marsh, Norfolk. From 1996 to 2005 he led birdwatching tours with a holiday company called Gullivers Natural History Holidays, travelling to locations including Costa Rica, Seychelles, the United States and the Spanish Pyrenees.

As Campaigns Officer and later, Campaigns Director at Compassion in World Farming from 1990 to 2000, he campaigned to end the live export of farm animals and ban the battery cage in the EU. He worked as Communications Director at the World Society for the Protection of Animals (now known as World Animal Protection) from 2003 to 2005. In 2005, Lymbery became chief executive officer of Compassion in World Farming.

The Grocer has described Lymbery as one of the food industry’s most influential people, and he has led Compassion's engagement work with over 1,000 food companies worldwide, to secure animal welfare improvements for over two billion farm animals every year.

He has expanded the charity's operations internationally, including establishing offices in the EU, US and China and repositioned the charity as an animal welfare environmental organisation linking animal welfare and food policy to environmental decline. He invented the concept of welfare potential – the idea that farming systems such as free range or organic have far more welfare potential than industrial methods, and calls for animals to experience the joy of life and for animal welfare to be more than the absence of suffering.

Lymbery also set up the Extinction and Livestock conference in London in October 2017, bringing together Compassion in World Farming and WWF UK, supported by HRH Prince of Wales Charitable Foundation. It was at this event that Lymbery called for a new global agreement on food systems. He predicted that meat eating will be a thing of the past by 2100 in a debate at Oxford Union in January 2018 and in an op-ed article published in The Daily Telegraph the same month.

Lymbery's first book, Farmageddon: The True Cost of Cheap Meat, is described as 'a wake-up call to change our current food production and eating practices, looking behind the closed doors of the runaway industry and striving to find a better farming future.'

In response to the book, The Sunday Telegraph said: "Thanks to campaigners such as Philip Lymbery, the truth about factory farming has been laid bare", and Joanna Lumley described the book as: "A devastating indictment of cheap meat and factory farming. Don’t turn away: it demands reading and deserves the widest possible audience." This was followed by the publication of Farmageddon in Pictures: The True Cost of Cheap Meat – in bite-sized pieces, a pictorial version of the original.

Lymbery's second book Dead Zone: Where the Wild Things Were, focuses on how industrial agriculture is a major driver of wildlife declines worldwide: from mammals, to sea life, birds, reptiles and insects.

TV presenter and naturalist, Chris Packham, described Dead Zone as: "An honest, compelling and important account and a critical lease for a fusion of farming, food and nature."

Lymbery is a recognised thought leader and is regarded as one of the food industry's most influential people. He has taken part in several Chatham House, UN and EAT meetings, and his lectures, speeches and appearances take him across the world to meet with policymakers, companies, experts and members of the public.

== Personal life ==
Lymbery has had a lifelong interest in birdwatching. He has travelled extensively and spent 10 years leading wildlife tours for Gulliver’s Natural History Holidays to locations including the Seychelles, Costa Rica, Morocco, the United States of America and various destinations in Europe. He is a licensed bird-ringer for the British Trust for Ornithology.

A keen photographer, Lymbery is also a naturalist and environmentalist aiming to draw attention to the role of industrial agriculture in the decline of wildlife worldwide.

Lymbery lives in rural West Sussex with his wife, stepson, a rescue dog and three chickens. He is a licensed bird-ringer for the British Trust for Ornithology.

== Publications ==
- Lymbery, Philip (2022-08-18). Sixty Harvests Left: How to Reach a Nature-Friendly Future. Bloomsbury. ISBN 9781526619327. This book not only reveals how industrial farming is ruining our soils but shows how we can adapt to restore the planet for a nature-friendly future.
- Lymbery, Philip (2018-03-08). Dead Zone: Where the wild things were. Bloomsbury. ISBN 9781408868287. The book is focused on the impacts of industrial farming on wildlife worldwide: from mammals, to sea life, birds, reptiles and insects.
- Lymbery, Philip and Isabel Oakeshott (2017-09-07). Farmageddon in Pictures: The true cost of Cheap Meat – in bite sized pieces. ISBN 9781408873465.
- Lymbery, Philip and Isabel Oakeshott (2014-01-31). Farmageddon: The True Cost of Cheap Meat. London. ISBN 978-1-40884-644-5. Published by Bloomsbury in January 2014, Farmageddon is described as 'a wake-up call to change our current food production and eating practices, looking behind the closed doors of the runaway industry and striving to find a better farming future.' Joanna Lumley says of this book, "A devastating indictment of cheap meat and factory farming. Don't turn away: it demands reading and deserves the widest possible audience."
- Lymbery, Philip (2008-03-30). "The Theory and Application of Welfare Potential", in Proceedings of the Importance of Farm Animal Welfare Science to Sustainable Agriculture Forum. Beijing: CIWF, RSPCA, WSPA, HSI with the support of the European Commission.
- Lymbery, Philip (2004). "A Comparison between Slaughterhouse Standards and Methods Used during Whaling", "An Introduction into Animal Welfare", in Philippa Brakes, Andrew Butterworth, Mark Simmons & Philip Lymbery, Troubled Waters – A Review of the Welfare Implications of Modern Whaling Activities. London: WSPA. ISBN 0-9547065-0-1.
- Druce, C. & Philip Lymbery (2003). Outlawed in Europe: Farm Animal Welfare – 3 Decades of Progress in Europe. New York City: Animal Rights International.
- Lymbery, Philip (2002). Laid Bare: The Case Against Enriched Cages in Europe. Petersfield: CIWF.
- Lymbery, Philip (2002). Farm Assurance Schemes & Animal Welfare: Can We Trust Them? Petersfield: CIWF.
- Lymbery, Philip (2002). Supermarkets & Farm Animal Welfare: Raising the Standard. Petersfield: CIWF.
- Lymbery, Philip (2002). In Too Deep: The Welfare of Intensively Farmed Fish. Petersfield: CIWF.
- Lymbery, Philip & Jacky Turner (1999). Brittle Bones: Osteoporosis & the Battery Cage. Petersfield: CIWF.
- Lymbery, Philip (1992). The Welfare of Farmed Fish. Petersfield: CIWF.

== Awards ==
In 2015, he received the prize "Archivio Disarmo - Golden Doves for Peace" awarded by IRIAD.
