= Biteback Publishing =

UK political publisher

- Founded: 2009
- Country of origin: United Kingdom
- Headquarters location: Hull
- Distribution: Marston Book Services (UK); Consortium Book Sales & Distribution (US); NewSouth Books (Australia); Pansing Distribution (Singapore)
- Publication types: Books
- Imprints: The Robson Press
- Official website: www.bitebackpublishing.com

Biteback Publishing is a British publisher based in Hull, and concentrating mainly on political titles. It was incorporated, as a private limited company with share capital, in 2009. It was jointly owned by its managing director Iain Dale and by Michael Ashcroft's Political Holdings Ltd, until 2018 when Dale stepped down to focus on his television and radio work. Biteback Publishing has published several books by Ashcroft including Call Me Dave, his 2015 biography of David Cameron.

Other titles include Out in the Army: My Life as a Gay Soldier (2013) by James Wharton, The Left's Jewish Problem (2016) by Dave Rich, and Post-Truth: How Bullshit Conquered the World (2017) by investigative journalist James Ball.

in 2017 & 2018 the company published two books by Labour MP Austin Mitchell, Revenge of the Rich: The Neoliberal Revolution in Britain and New Zealand, (2017) and Confessions of a Political Maverick (2018).

More recently, the company has published Jesse Norman's first novel, The Winding Stair (2023), which won the 2023 Parliamentary Book Award for Nonfiction or Fiction by a Parliamentarian, Ten Years To Save The West by Liz Truss and Andrew Pierce's bestselling memoir Finding Margaret (2024), about his search for his birth mother.

In 2025 Biteback acquired the world rights for How to Launder Money: A Guide for Law Enforcement, Prosecutors, and Policymakers authored by Donald Trump-linked political fundraiser George Cottrell and international investigator Burke Files.

Biteback announced they will publish the authorised biography of entrepreneur Denis Lynn, written by Jago Pearson, in 2026.

As of 2014 around 20% of the company's sales are ebooks.
