= Call Me Dave =

2015 book by Michael Ashcroft and Isabel Oakeshott

Call Me Dave: The Unauthorised Biography of David Cameron
- Cover of 1st edition (UK, 2015)
- Author: Michael Ashcroft; Isabel Oakeshott
- Subject: David Cameron
- Published: London
- Publisher: Biteback Publishing
- Publication date: 12 October 2015
- Publication place: United Kingdom
- ISBN: 9781849549141

Call Me Dave: The Unauthorised Biography of David Cameron is a 2015 book by Michael Ashcroft, a businessman and Conservative peer, and Isabel Oakeshott, a right-wing political journalist, about the then Prime Minister of the United Kingdom, David Cameron. The book, excerpts from which were published in the Daily Mail prior to publication, received significant media attention, particularly relating to allegations made about Cameron. It is published by Biteback, a company in which Ashcroft has a majority share, run by political blogger Iain Dale.

== Synopsis ==
=== Piggate ===
The book contains an uncorroborated allegation that, during his university years, Cameron put a "private part of his anatomy" into a dead pig's mouth as part of an initiation ceremony for the Piers Gaveston Society. The allegation was attributed to a Member of Parliament who was a "distinguished Oxford contemporary" of Cameron's. Ashcroft and Oakeshott failed to receive a response from the purported owner of an alleged photograph of the incident, and since the extract's publication no corroborating evidence has been produced to support the allegation. A spokesperson for the Prime Minister said that they did not "need to dignify the book by offering any comment", while friends reported him saying that the claim was "utter nonsense". Cameron appeared to refer to Ashcroft and the book with a joke that he had had an injection that day and had been told to expect "a little prick, a little stab in the back".

== Publication and reception ==
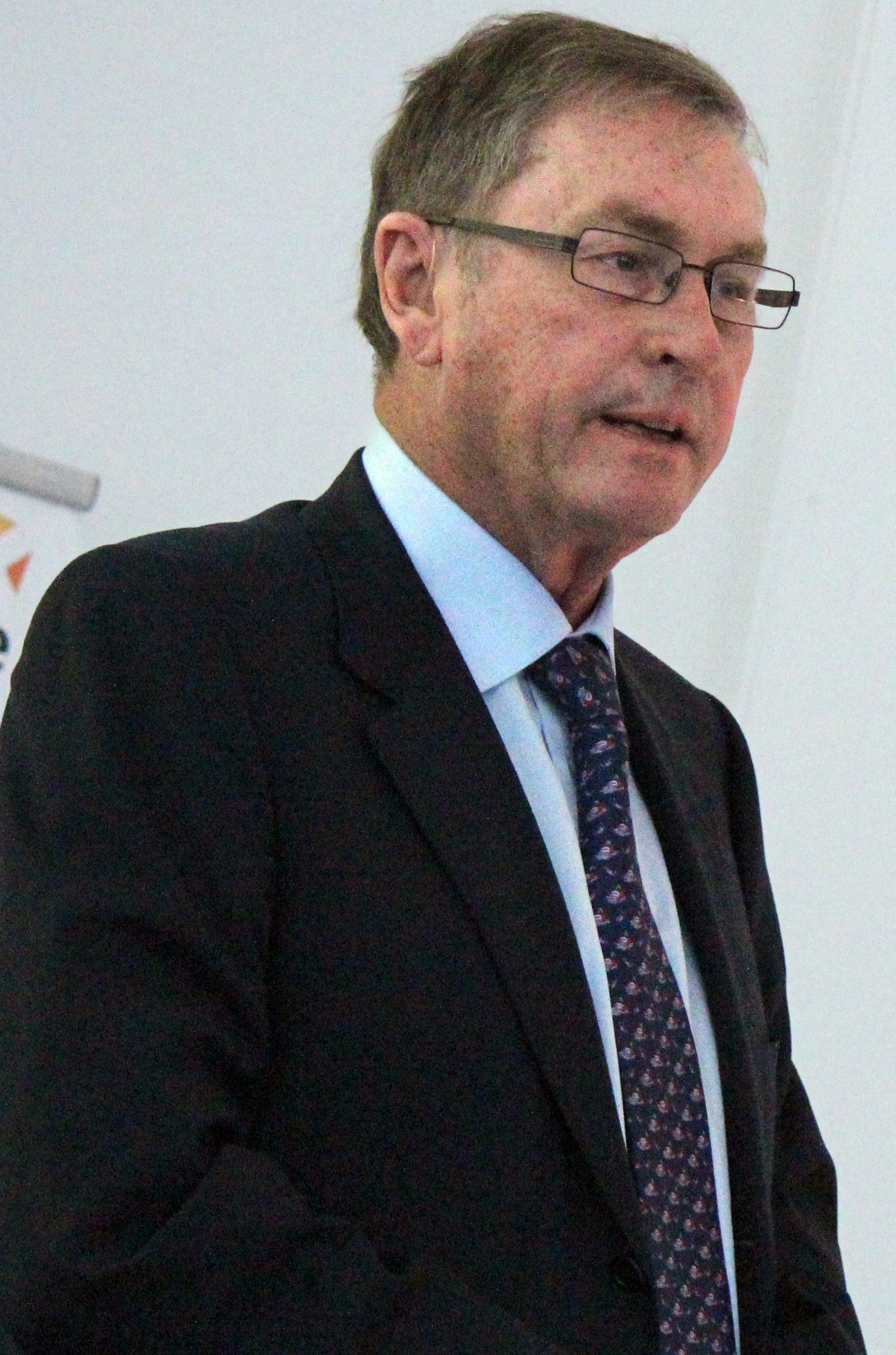
Michael Ashcroft

The book is an analysis of Cameron's life, education, early career and political career. Ashcroft hired Oakeshott in 2013 to co-author the book, paying a reported £500,000. Following the publicity given to the advance serialisation of the book in the Daily Mail, the initial print run was increased from 6,000 to 35,000 copies, according to Dale. Reception to the book was mixed, with some criticising the story as "salacious". In The Guardian Michael White wrote that the book was a "Jacobean revenge biography" and described Ashcroft as "one of the more bizarre figures on the fringes of British public life".

Although Ashcroft's introduction to the book claimed it was "not about settling scores", and that he had sought Oakeshott's involvement to ensure the book was objective, the book was widely viewed as an act of revenge on Cameron for declining to offer Ashcroft, a major Conservative Party donor, a significant position in government. Allison Pearson, writing for The Daily Telegraph, argued that the nature of the book suggested that Cameron's decision not to promote Ashcroft had been "entirely justified". Oakeshott argued that they had held back publication until after the 2015 general election to avoid damaging Cameron and the Conservatives in the polls. Roy Greenslade, writing for The Guardian, acknowledged the book might have had more impact in the run up to the election, but argued that "most of the negative stuff is historical, unsurprising and of little real consequence".

Following publication of the book, book reviews by British newspapers highlighted the persistent use of unsupported innuendo, and identified the motive for publication as revenge.
