= Piers Gaveston Society =

University of Oxford dining club

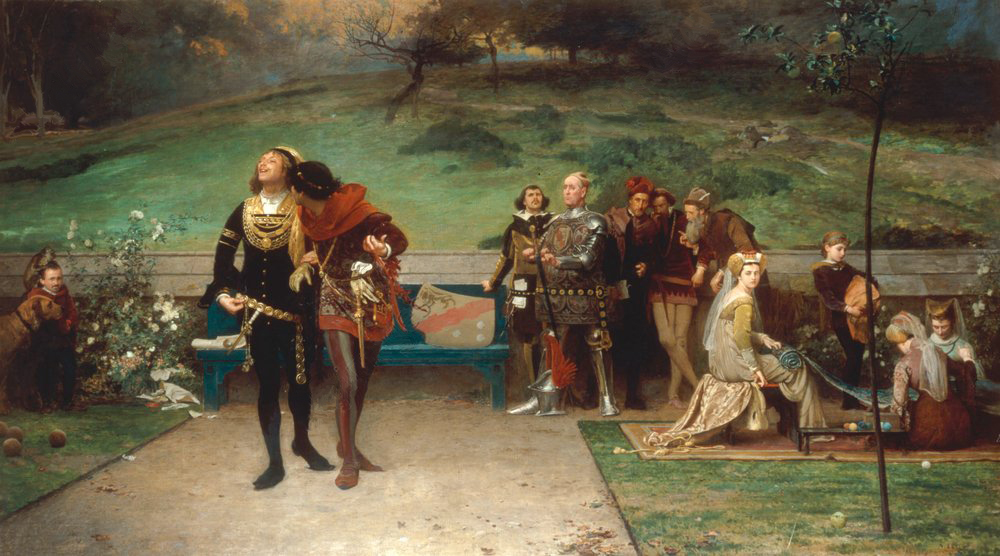
Edward II. and his Favourite, Piers Gaveston, Marcus Stone, 1872.

The Piers Gaveston Society, or Piers Gav for short, is a dining club founded in 1977 at the University of Oxford. It is named in honour of Piers Gaveston, favourite of King Edward II of England. In recent years, parties run by the society have been the focus of increased tabloid news coverage revolving around lurid allegations of debauched behaviour, such as Piggate.

== History ==
The Piers Gaveston Society was founded in 1977 by a group of friends that included the brewery heir Valentine Guinness (younger son of the 3rd Baron Moyne). It was then limited to 12 male members. In 1986, an article of The Washington Post claimed Count Gottfried von Bismarck was a member of the Society and described the club as "originally an all-gay group [where] the rules say members have to dress in drag and parade openly in public".

The Society was first brought into the spotlight in 1983 after photos of the ball at the Park Lane Hotel leaked to the public, including photos of the young actor Hugh Grant.

== Motto ==
The club's motto is Latin: "(Sane) non memini ne audisse unum alterum ita dilexisse" which translates roughly as "Truly, none remember hearing of a person enjoying another so much".

== Crest ==
The club's crest is an adaptation of the original coat of arms of Piers Gaveston.

== Activities ==
While some have described it as an extreme club that hosts secret events which include hard drug use and orgies, others have said that the society's events – at least during the 1990s – were not as debauched or scandalous as the media portrayed. Journalist Danny Kemp described it as "raunchy fancy dress"and "not-terribly-debauched public schoolboys' idea of debauchery."

Attendants allegedly have to sign a non-disclosure agreement before participating to the society's events, and no phones are allowed.

== Membership ==
Membership is limited to 10 undergraduates, grouped into 'Masters' and 'Minions'.

To join the Society as a 'Minion' an undergraduate must attend a party before submitting an application and being elected by existing members. In their second year as a member they become Masters, and are paired with a Minion.

Non-members are invited to most events including the winter, spring and summer balls. Each member may invite dozens of guests, who may be blackballed by other members if deemed unsuitable.

== Piggate ==
Piggate refers to an uncorroborated anecdote by a British MP that British Prime Minister David Cameron inserted part of his genitalia into a dead pig's mouth as part of a Piers Gaveston Society initiation ceremony. The Piers Gaveston Society received significant media attention as a result of Piggate. Cameron has strongly denied those claims.

== See also ==
- List of University of Oxford dining clubs
- Bullingdon Club
