= James Wharton (author) =

British writer

James Ronald Wharton
- James Wharton in 2013
- Born: 1 January 1987 (age 39); Wrexham, Wales
- Occupations: Author, LGBT activist, former Lance Corporal Blues and Royals
- Writing career
- Notable works: Out in the Army; Something for the weekend

James Wharton (born 1 January 1987) is the author of Out in the Army: My Life as a Gay Soldier and Something for the Weekend': Life in the Chemsex Underworld and an LGBT activist. Wharton was born in Wrexham on the first of January 1987, and grew up in the nearby village of Gwersyllt. In 2009, he garnered attention by featuring on the cover of Soldier Magazine – the official monthly publication of the British Army – as an openly gay trooper in the Blues and Royals. Wharton came out as gay to his regiment in 2005, aged 18 and just six years after the army's discrimination against gay people was declared a breach of human rights by the European Court of Human Rights. Before 2000, Wharton could have been court-martialled.

Wharton left the army in 2013 after ten years' service and in 2014, he was granted the Freedom of the City of London for his work as a prominent LGBT activist. Following working in public relations and for the LGBT-specialist insurance company Emerald Life, Wharton was the Wellbeing Services Manager at Birmingham LGBT until September 2019. As of 2023, Wharton is a reporter working for Forces News.

== Background ==
Until 2000, the British Ministry of Defence (MOD) policy was to continue the long-standing ban on gay people in the Armed Forces, and 298 were dismissed in 1999, the year before the ban was lifted. A legal challenge to this stance was taken up by four people who had been investigated and dismissed for being gay — a female nurse and male administrator dismissed from the Royal Air Force, and a Lieutenant Commander and naval rating, both males, dismissed from the Royal Navy. Their legal challenge was supported by the pressure groups Liberty and Stonewall. After losing the case at the Court of Appeal in London, they appealed to the European Court of Human Rights in Strasbourg. In September 1999, this court ruled that investigations by military authorities into a service person's sexuality breaches their right to privacy (Article 8 of the European Convention on Human Rights). In light of the ruling (which as an ECHR ruling applies to the militaries of all member states of the EU and of the Council of Europe), the MOD subsequently lifted the ban, and began allowing gay people into the services from 2000 onwards. According to a national opinion poll published a week before the ruling, the ban had been opposed by 68% of Britons.

== Army career ==
Having had a lifelong ambition to serve in the British Army, Wharton began his career aged sixteen, following three years with the Army Cadets. After his basic training at The Army Foundation College in Harrogate from 2003 to 2004, Wharton signed up as a Trooper in the Blues and Royals division of the Household Cavalry in 2005. For his first two years, Wharton's duties were largely ceremonial but in 2007 he saw active service in Iraq as a member of an armoured reconnaissance unit. In 2008, Wharton was seconded to Canada to take part in the training troops for active service under the command of Prince Harry, who defended Wharton against a homophobic threat from soldiers in another regiment. Wharton later described the incident in his book Out in the Army and he defended his publicising Prince Harry's role in it by saying "(he) wanted to write honestly about his time in the Army".

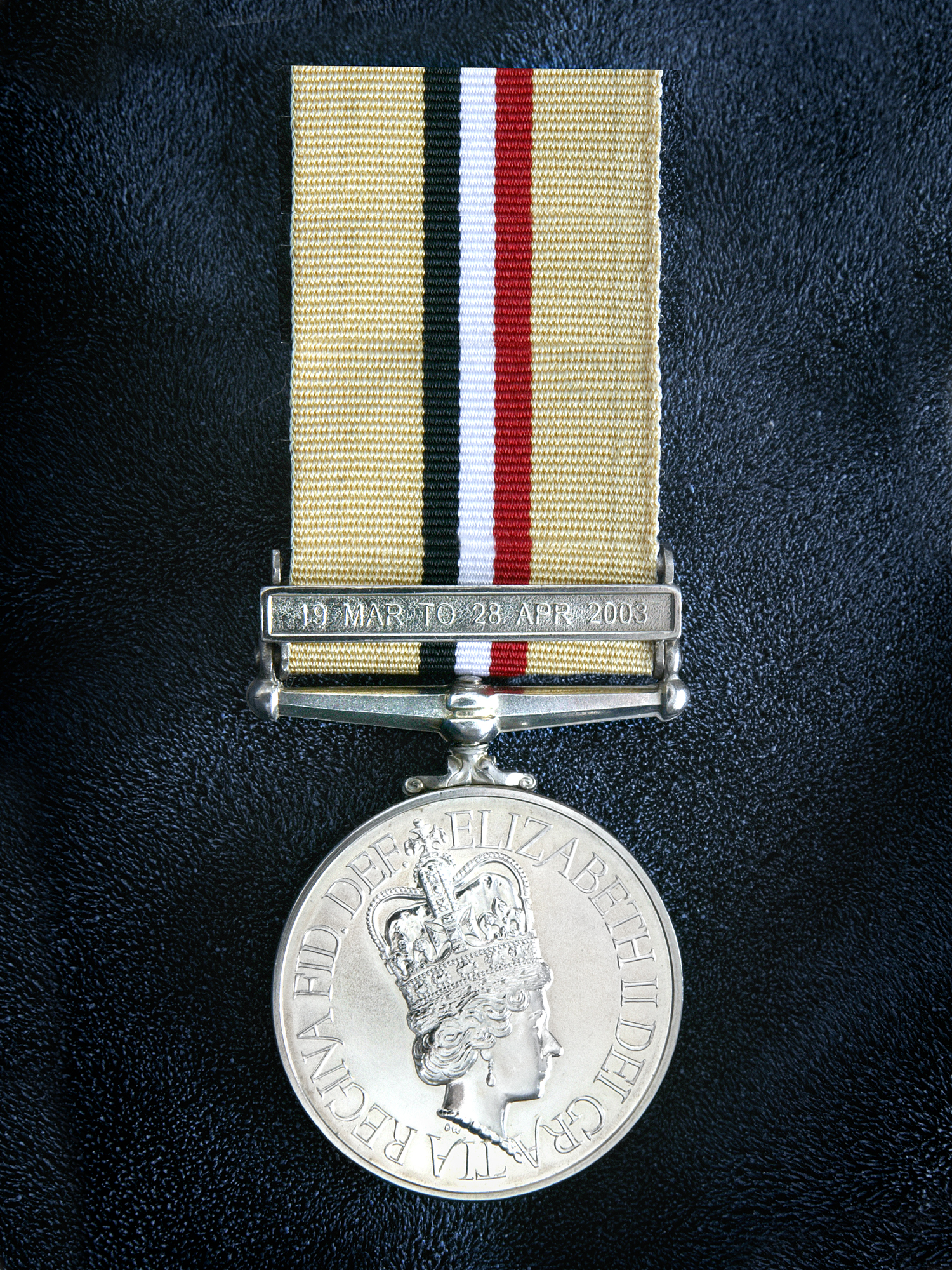
Obverse of the Iraq Medal with clasp, showing design of clasp and suspension bar

By the mid-2000s, the Armed Forces had begun to celebrate their modern approach to diversity and in 2008, gay servicemen and lesbian service women were encouraged to take part in London Gay Pride in their uniforms. (According to a Royal Air Force press release, "personnel will be considered to be on-duty for the uniformed element of the event"). At first worried that he might be the only serviceman to attend, Wharton was joined by over fifty uniformed men and women from across the armed services.

In 2009, Wharton was invited to appear in Soldier magazine – the official monthly publication of the British Army. What Wharton expected to be a short article on his experience as an openly gay soldier in the British Army turned out to be the featured article. A photograph of Wharton in dress uniform and wearing his Iraq Medal decorated the cover alongside the word "pride" in bold. Just nine years before it was illegal to be gay and serve in the armed forces. The following year, Wharton entered a Civil Partnership, which was later that day celebrated at the non-commissioned officers' mess in the Household Cavalry's Hyde Park barracks.

Having returned to ceremonial duties, in 2010, Wharton took part in Trooping of the Colour, which since 1748, has marked the official birthday of the British sovereign. In 2011, Wharton formally escorted the Queen Elizabeth II at the wedding of the Duke and Duchess of Cambridge. Wharton returned to public attention in May 2012, when a photograph of him – in uniform and without permission from his commanding officer – alongside his civil partner was published on the cover of Attitude with the heading "Have you heard the one about the Iraq veteran who can fight for his country but can't get married?" In the same year, Wharton came 20th of 250 influential lesbian, gay, bisexual and transgender people on The Pink List. In 2013, after a decade of service, which included meeting Prime Ministers Gordon Brown and David Cameron, and advising representatives of the US Armed Forces on their "Don't Ask, Don't tell" policy, Wharton left the army and published his autobiography.

== Out in the Army – My Life as a Gay Soldier ==
Published in 2013 (and with an afterword) in 2014, Wharton's autobiography and first book was met with critical acclaim. Covering Wharton's career in the army from 2003 to 2013, Paul Gambaccini described it as "the most moving book I have read" and publisher Ian Dale listed it as among the top 25 books published by Politico's & Biteback. Stephen Fry described it as "a wonderful, stirring and thrilling read".

== Gay saunas controversy ==
In a column for the launch edition of Winq magazine in 2014, Wharton advocated the closure of gay saunas. He claimed that saunas promoted homophobia and were "thorns in our side that mark our community as different for the wrong reasons." His views sparked a nationwide controversy and met with strong opposition by notable LGBT activists, including Peter Tatchell, Matthew Hodson, chief executive of the gay men's health charity GMFA, and Jason Warriner, clinical director for The Terrence Higgins Trust, who argued that "(closing saunas) would make it more difficult for organisations like Terrence Higgins Trust to provide safer sex information, supply condoms and deliver HIV testing services among groups at increased risk of sexually transmitted infections and HIV." Wharton later retracted his comments, which he said were in part due to a traumatic experience he had in a sauna when he was eighteen.

== Something for the weekend – Life in the chemsex underworld ==
In 2014, a year after leaving in the army, Wharton's civil partnership broke down and he moved to an apartment in north London. A far cry from the house he lived in with his civil partner and their two dogs. In need of a new circle of friends, Wharton discovered the London chemsex network and fell victim to it. Wharton later wrote Something for the weekend:Life in the chemsex underworld – that included recounts of his personal involvement – which was published in 2017. The Telegraph wrote of the book "(it) looks compassionately at a growing culture that's now moved beyond London and established itself as more than a short-term craze." His publisher, Iain Dale said, "this book...describes the true secret lives of many men in the nation’s capital. It’s an important story that needs to be told and will surprise many". In a 2017 interview for The Times, Wharton said:

"And it became obvious to me that there was an undercurrent of drug use going on in all these places. The last time I was single, in 2006, drugs were underground. I was up and down the streets of Soho, and if they’d been there, I would have seen them. But when I come back in 2014 as a single person? Everyone is high. Everyone is offering you drugs. Nobody seems to care."

In 2016, Wharton, seeking help with his addiction, turned to the Wandsworth Community Drug and Alcohol Service, and with their support, walked away from the chemsex culture. Following his recovery, Wharton went on to campaign against the stigma of chemsex addiction and the danger it presents to mental and sexual health.

== Bibliography ==
- James Wharton; Out in the Army. My Life as a Gay Soldier, 2nd Revised edition, Biteback Publishing, 2014 ISBN 978-1-84954-756-7.
- James Wharton; Something for the Weekend. Life in the Chemsex Underworld, Biteback Publishing, 2017 ISBN 978-1-78590-229-1.
