= SkillForce =

British education charity

SkillForce was a British education charity that used the skills and experience of a predominantly ex-Service instructor workforce to support children and young people in UK primary and secondary schools to improve their confidence, resilience and self-esteem so that they are better equipped to deal with life's challenges and embrace its opportunities. SkillForce has also been referred to as a military ethos education charity. Founded in the late 1990s it became an independent charity in 2004.

== Prince William Award ==
The Duke of Cambridge became Royal Patron in 2009 and the Prince William Award programme was launched in 2016. It was a character and resilience award programme for children in the United Kingdom aged 6–14. Founded on 1 March 2017 by Prince William, it was the first such award programme in his name.

The award was delivered in partnership with schools at four different age range levels: Pioneer, Explorer, Trailblazer and Voyager. The levels explored 5 key themes and 28 guiding principles. The five key themes were:

- Personal Development
- Relationships
- Working together
- Community
- Environment
