= Ford Granada (Europe) =

European model of Ford Granada (1975-1982)

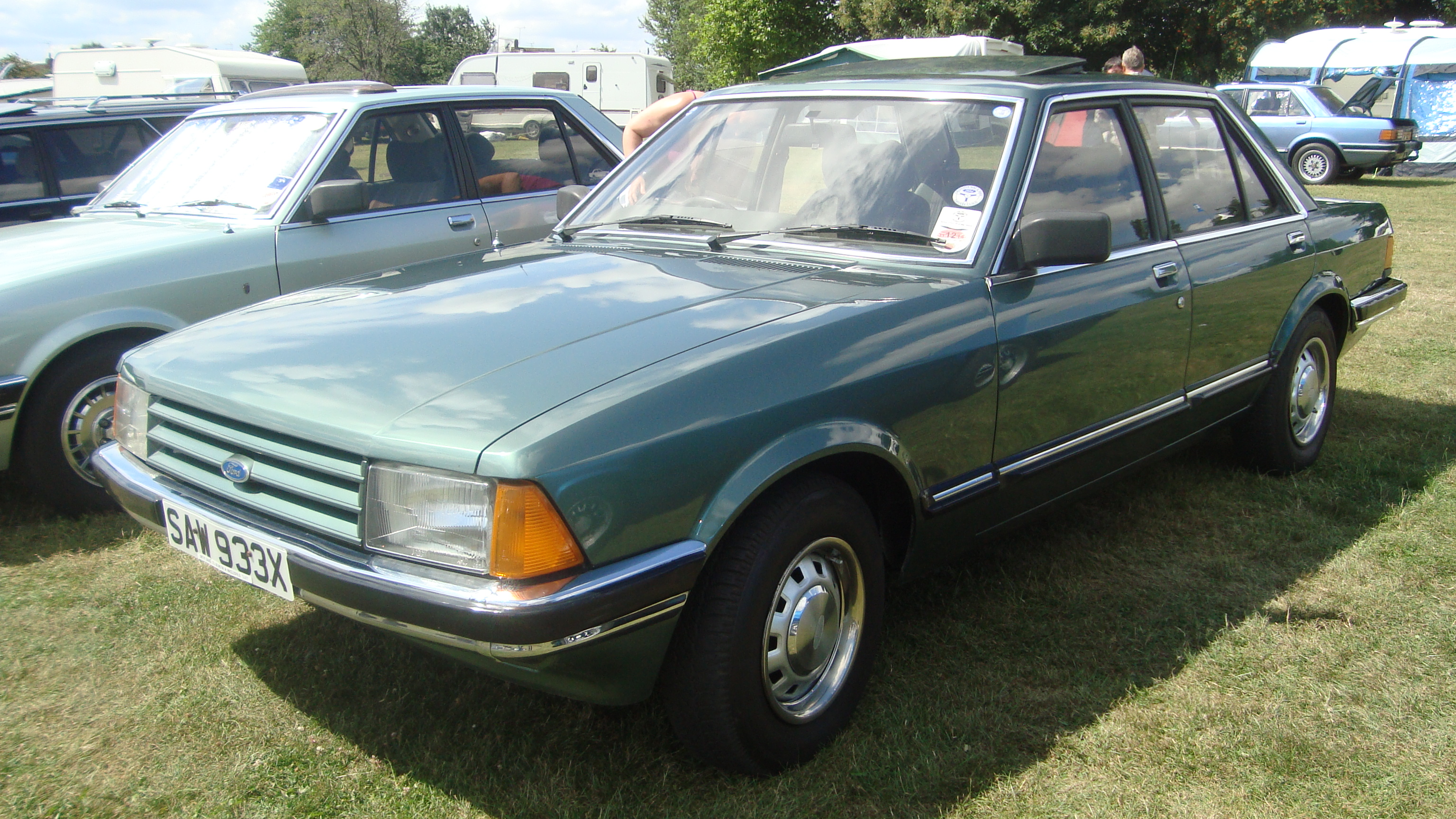
- Ford Granada Ghia (Mk II)

Overview
- Manufacturer: Ford Europe
- Production: Cologne: 1972–1994; Dagenham: 1972–1976

Body and chassis
- Class: Executive car (E)
- Layout: Front-engine, rear-wheel-drive

Chronology
- Predecessor: Ford Zephyr & Zodiac; Ford 17M/20M/26M
- Successor: Ford Scorpio; Hyundai Grandeur (South Korea)

The European Ford Granada is an executive car manufactured by Ford Europe from 1972 until 1994.

The first-generation model was produced from 1972 to 1976 at Ford's German factory in Cologne and at its British factory in Dagenham. In 1976, production switched entirely to Germany. The original version was replaced in 1977 by a second-generation model which was produced until 1985. From 1985 to 1994, the Granada name was used, in the United Kingdom and Ireland only, for a third-generation model which was sold in other European markets as the Ford Scorpio and in North America as the Merkur Scorpio.

== Mark I (1972–1977) ==
Mark I
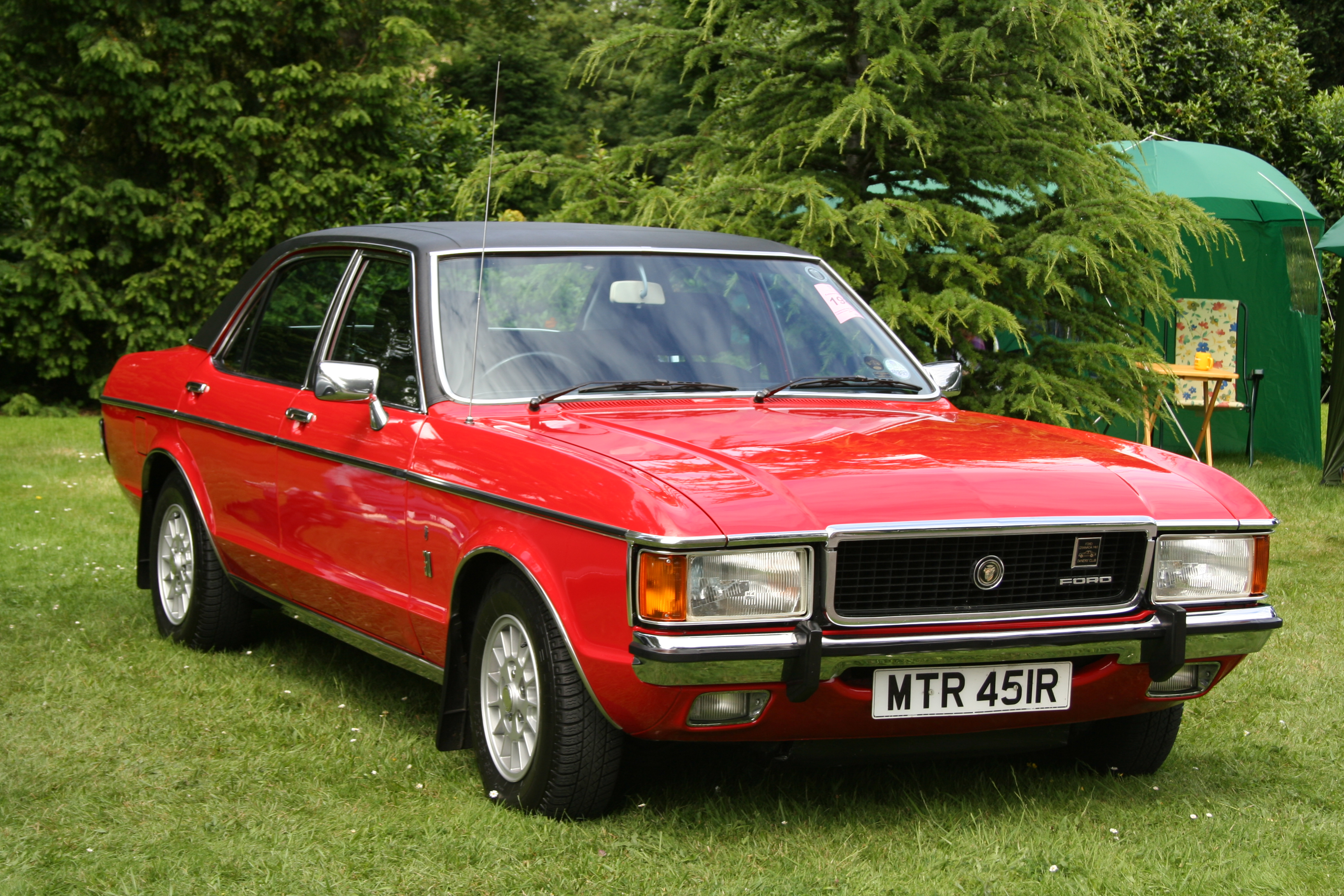

Overview
- Also called: Ford Consul
- Production: 1972–1977
- Assembly: West Germany: Cologne; United Kingdom: Dagenham; South Africa: Port Elizabeth (FMCSA)

Body and chassis
- Body style: 2/4-door saloon 5-door estate 2-door coupé

Powertrain
- Engine: 1.7 L V4 (Europe); 2.0 L I4; 2.0 L V4 (UK); 2.0 L V6 (Europe); 2.3 L V6 (Europe); 2.5 L V6 (UK/ZA); 2.6 L V6 (Europe); 2.8 L V6 (Europe); 3.0 L V6 (UK/ZA); 5.0 L V8 (ZA)
- Transmission: 4-speed manual all-synchromesh (optional); 3-speed automatic

Dimensions
- Wheelbase: 107 in (2,718 mm)
- Length: 180 in (4,572 mm)
- Width: 70.5 in (1,791 mm)
- Height: 53.9 in (1,369 mm)
- Curb weight: 1,190–1,430 kg (2,624–3,153 lb)

Launched in March 1972, the Granada succeeded the British Ford Zephyr, and the German P7-series as Ford's European executive car offering, and completed the integration of Ford's British and German model ranges.

At first, lower models in the range were called the Ford Consul. This may have been because of a lawsuit by Granada Group, a major British conglomerate of the time. However, their application for an injunction failed at appeal and they could not prevent Ford from registering the name Granada as a trademark Consequently, from 1975 on they were all called Granadas. The car soon became popular for taxi, fleet, and police use. It was also converted into limousine and hearse versions by the British companies Coleman Milne and Woodall Nicholson. Traditional four-door limousines were offered (both long and short versions) alongside an unusual four-door "coupé limousine" (of which only 12 examples were built), as well as hearses in either two- or four-door configurations.

Mechanically, the British Granada conformed to Ford convention, the initial range using the Ford Essex V4 unit in 2.0 L displacement, and the Essex V6 engine in 2.5 and 3.0 L capacities. German models employed a Ford Taunus V4 engine in 1.7 L displacement, or the 3.0L Essex V6, or, more commonly the Cologne V6 in 2.0, 2.3, or 2.6 L capacities. The V4 engine option was short lived - and was later replaced by the in-line "Pinto" (TL-series) unit in 1974. The car generally followed the mechanical layout of its predecessors Ford Zephyr/Zodiac, using a coil-spring independent rear end, although front MacPherson struts were replaced by double wishbones, introduced 18 months earlier in smaller TC Cortina and Taunus. However, the Granada – like Ford 17M/20M/26M – featured drum brakes at rear, as opposed to the Zephyr/Zodiac rear disc brakes. Some early 2.5L Granada fitted crossply, but they predominantly fitted 175R14 radial tyres on 5.5" rims or the 185R14 radial tyres on 6" rims, However the top end MK1 Granada fitted 195/70R14 Pirelli Cinturato CN36.

The car was available as a four-door saloon, a five-door estate (Turnier), and a two-door fastback coupé. The early (1972–73) coupé had slightly different sheet metal - a more pronounced coke bottle styling. In 1974, the coupé was revised, with straighter lines. A two-door saloon joined the range in May 1973, reducing the entry-level advertised German price of the car by 415 Marks, but the two-door saloon version was never produced nor officially sold in the UK. The revised “straight line rear wing” coupé was sold only in 3.0 Ghia trim in the UK, but elsewhere in Europe it was sold with other trims and all engines were available. This was the reverse of the situation with the TC Cortina and Taunus, where the British model had the "coke-bottle" styling. In continental Europe, the 1976-1977 Granadas were also available with the fuel-injected Cologne V6, producing 150 PS (110 kW).

South Africa

In South Africa, the Granada Perana V8, built by Basil Green Motors, was available through Ford dealers with the 302 cu in (4.9 L) Windsor V8 engine, developing 255 PS (188 kW; 252 hp) and 405 N⋅m (299 lb⋅ft) at 2600 rpm. Most Granadas in South Africa, however, were fitted with the 3.0 L six. The 2.5 L V6 was also offered, although this model was discontinued in 1975 as the six-cylinder Cortina increased in sales. The Granada was introduced to South Africa in late 1972 in 3000 GXL automatic trim, with other models (3000 XL, Coupé, 2500 L) to follow. The coupé was the last model planned, with a scheduled introduction for May 1973. The Granada replaced both the Australian-made Falcon (sold as a "Fairmont" locally) and the 20M of German origins.

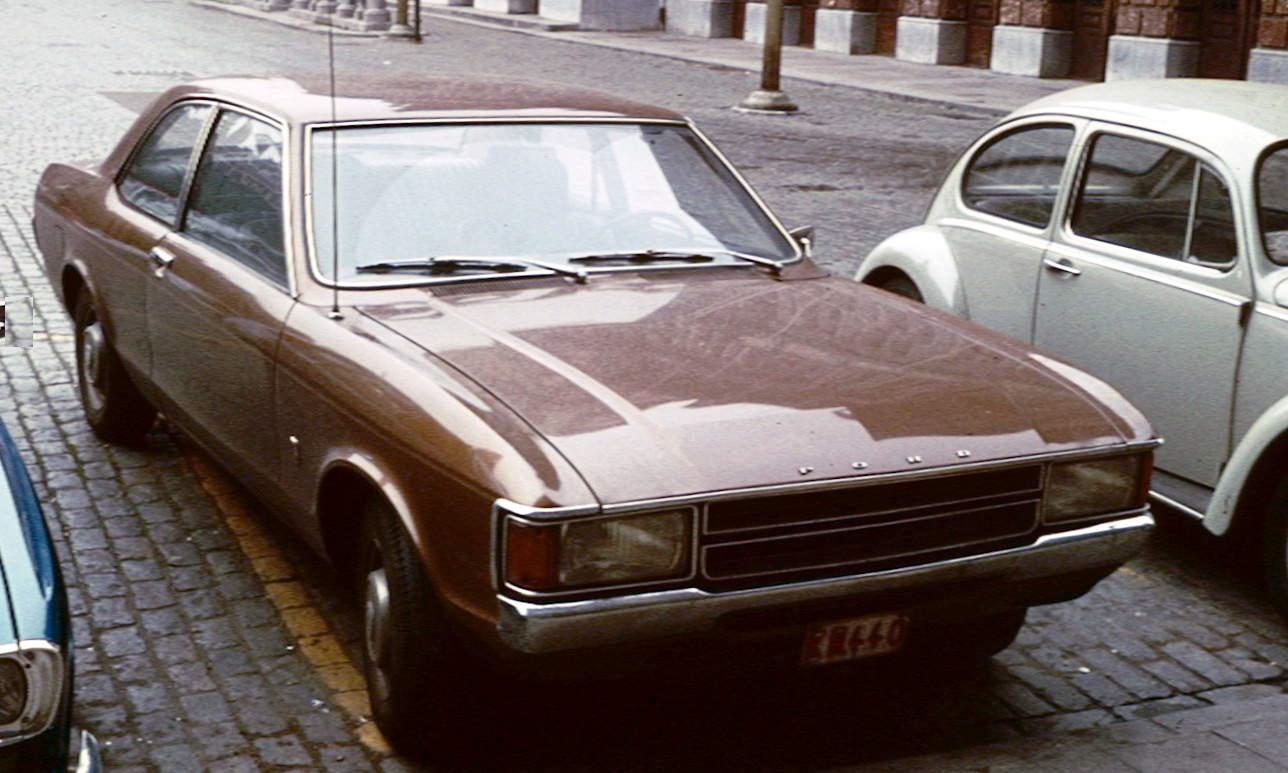
Ford Consul two-door saloon

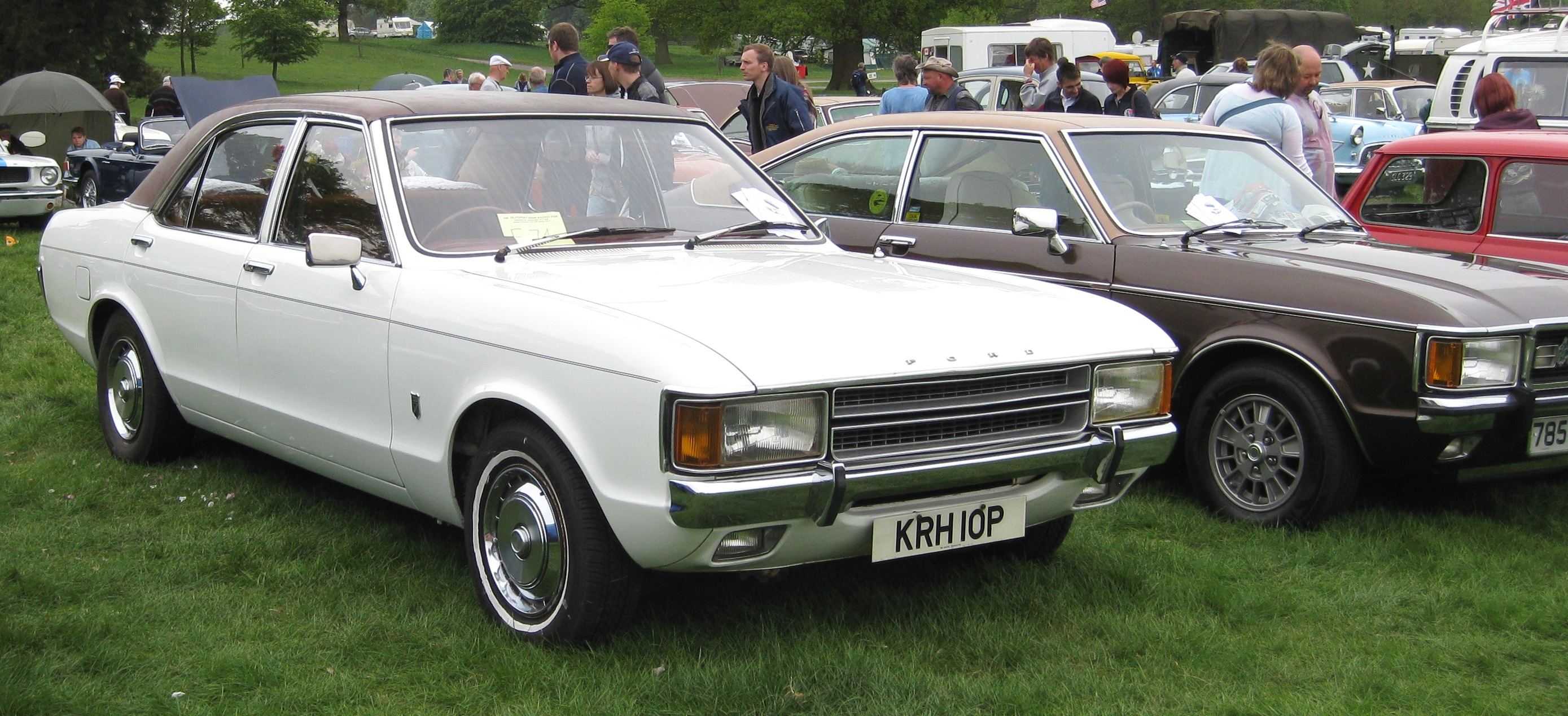
Ford Consul four-door saloon

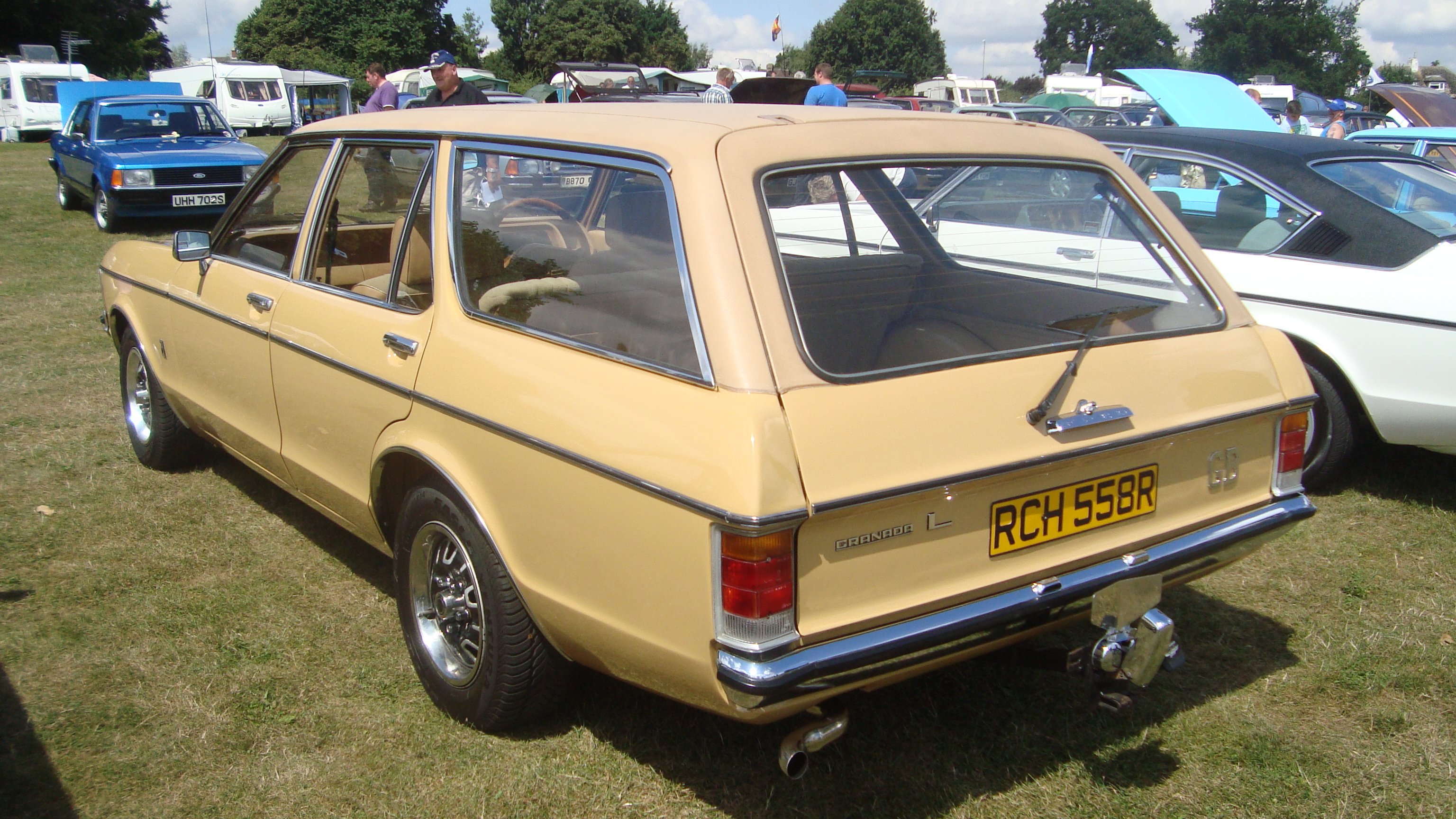
Ford Granada Mark I estate

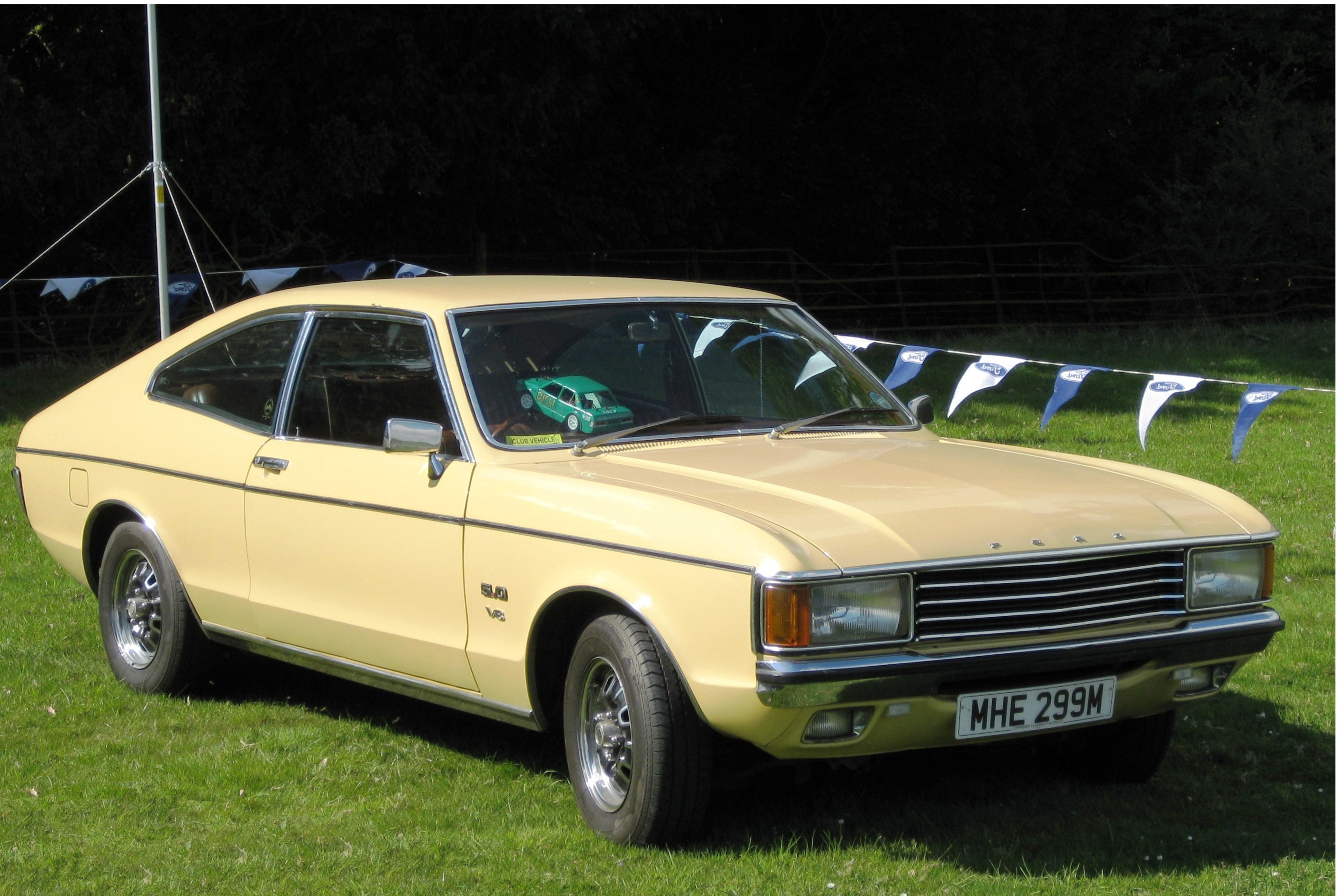
Ford Granada Mark I coupé

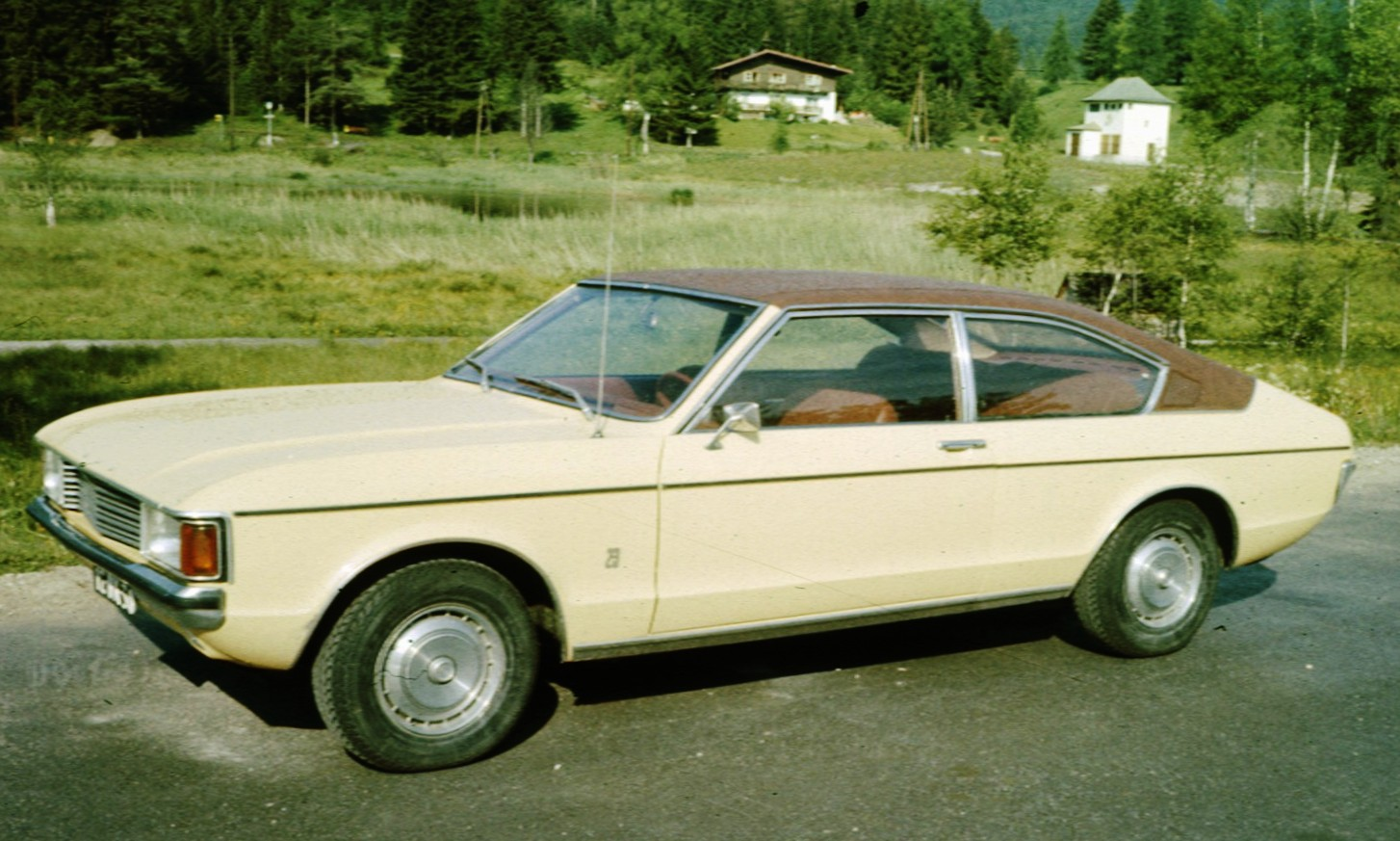
Ford Granada Mark I coupé, later version

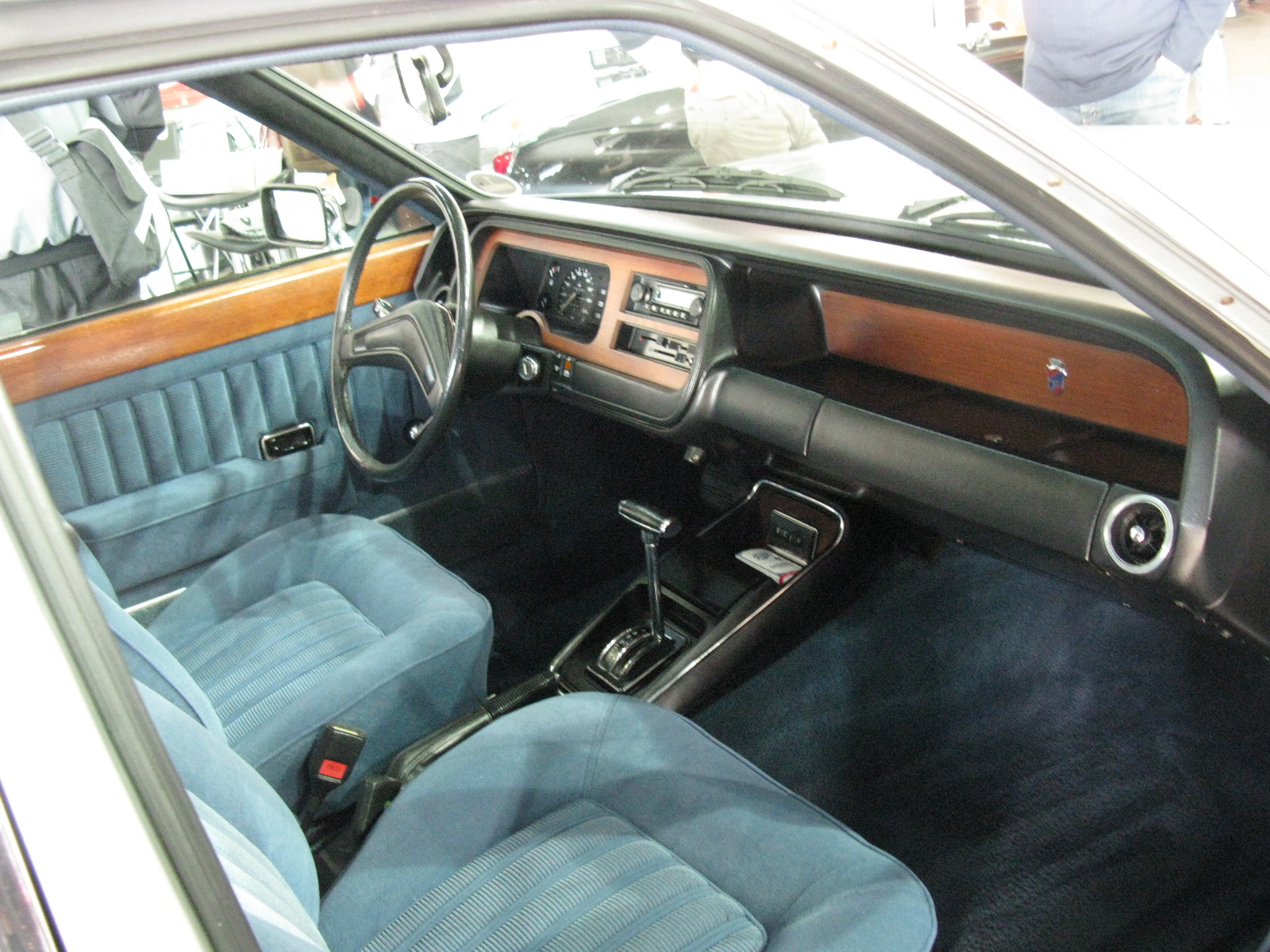
Ford Granada Mark I coupé interior

== Mark II (1977–1985) ==
Mark II
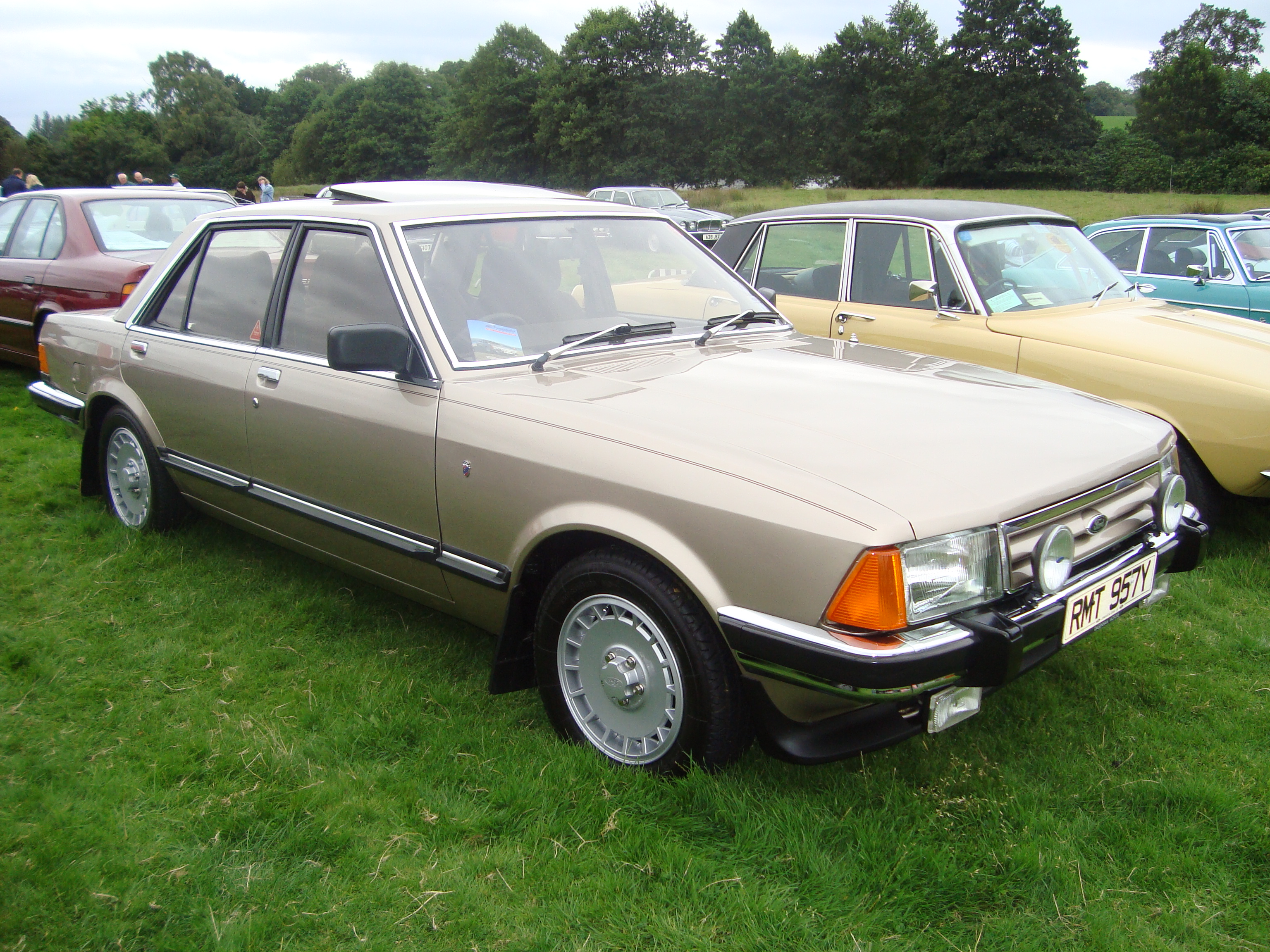

Overview
- Production: 1977–1985
- Assembly: West Germany: Cologne; Taiwan: Taoyuan City (Ford Lio Ho); South Korea: Ulsan (Hyundai); South Africa: Port Elizabeth (FMCSA); South Africa: Silverton, Pretoria (Samcor)

Body and chassis
- Body style: 2-door saloon 4-door saloon 5-door estate

Powertrain
- Engine: Petrol: 1593 cc TL16H I4; 1699 cc Taunus V4; 1993 cc TL20H I4; 1999 cc V6; 2294 cc V6; 2792 cc V6; Diesel; 1948 cc (Peugeot) I4; 2112 cc (Peugeot) I4; 2498 cc (Peugeot) I4
- Transmission: 4/5-speed manual 3-speed automatic

Dimensions
- Wheelbase: 2,769 mm (109.0 in)
- Length: 4,720 mm (186 in) (Saloon); 4,824 mm (189.9 in) (Estate/Turnier)
- Width: 1,791 mm (70.5 in)
- Height: 1,416 mm (55.7 in) (Saloon); 1,422 mm (56.0 in) (Estate/Turnier)

Chronology
- Successor: Ford Scorpio (outside UK); Hyundai Grandeur (South Korea)

The square and straight-lined Granada Mark II – known internally within Ford as "Granada 78" – was released in August 1977 (for the 1978 model year) and was produced until April 1985, following a mild facelift and attention to drivetrain noise, vibration, and harshness in 1981. The Mark II was essentially a reskin of the 1972 car, with new external panelwork that brought the Granada into line with Ford's new design language initiated by stylist Uwe Bahnsen, taking styling cues also used on the recently launched Cortina/Taunus Mk IV and Mk I Fiesta. Even non-Ford styling was considered: during the 1971 Geneva Motorshow, Bahnsen and Joe Oros, from the US Ford design team, fell in love with the Fiat 130 Coupé, a design by Paolo Martin of Pininfarina. The Ford design studios in Cologne-Merkenich, Germany, purchased a 130 Coupé, and Bahnsen told Patrick Le Quément, at the time in charge of the department Forward Design at Ford, to 'design a car looking just as good as this one'.

Much of the Mark I bodywork was retained, such as inner door pressings – the curved uptick at the rear doors now disguised with black paint behind the horizontal chrome trim strip on the saloon – and the estate version effectively grafted the Mk II nose to the Mk I body, retaining the same panels as the old car aft of the A pillars.

The engineering was very similar, the main differences being the "Cologne" V6 engine in 2.0, 2.3, and 2.8 L forms replacing the older "Essex" unit, and the introduction of features such as air conditioning and, for the top-priced 2.8-litre versions, fuel-injection. In mainland Europe, a 1.7 L V4 was originally available. By the time of its introduction, UK Granada production had been quietly abandoned "for some time"; UK market Granada IIs were imported from Germany. Internally within Ford, the "Cologne" 1.7, 2.0, 2.3, and 2.8 units were the last derivatives of the 'V-Taunus' range of engines. UK and Irish spec 2.0 Granadas used the 4-cylinder ""Pinto" (or TL-series) engine, as did continental market 1.6 versions - this smaller capacity was deemed too small for the British and Irish markets and was therefore not offered. Predominantly, like the MK1, the MK2 Granada continued to fit 175R14 on the smaller wheels and 185R14 on 6" with the 195/70R14 Pirelli Cinturato CN36 becoming more commonplace, while the new 190/65VR390 Michelin TRX became the wheel and tyre combination for the top of the range cars.

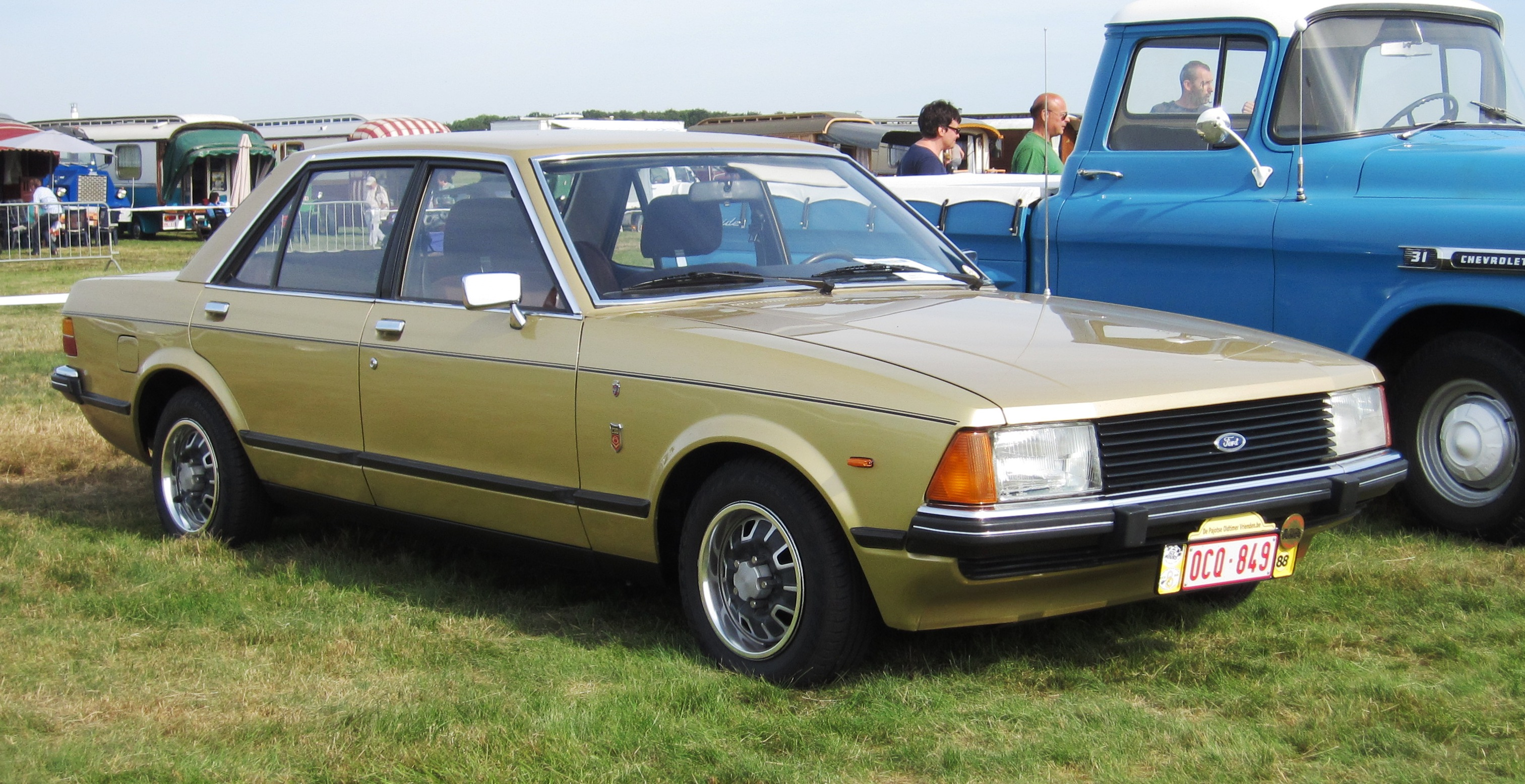
Although most surviving Granada Mark IIs feature the body-coloured post-facelift (1981) grille, earlier cars came with a simple black grille regardless of body colour.

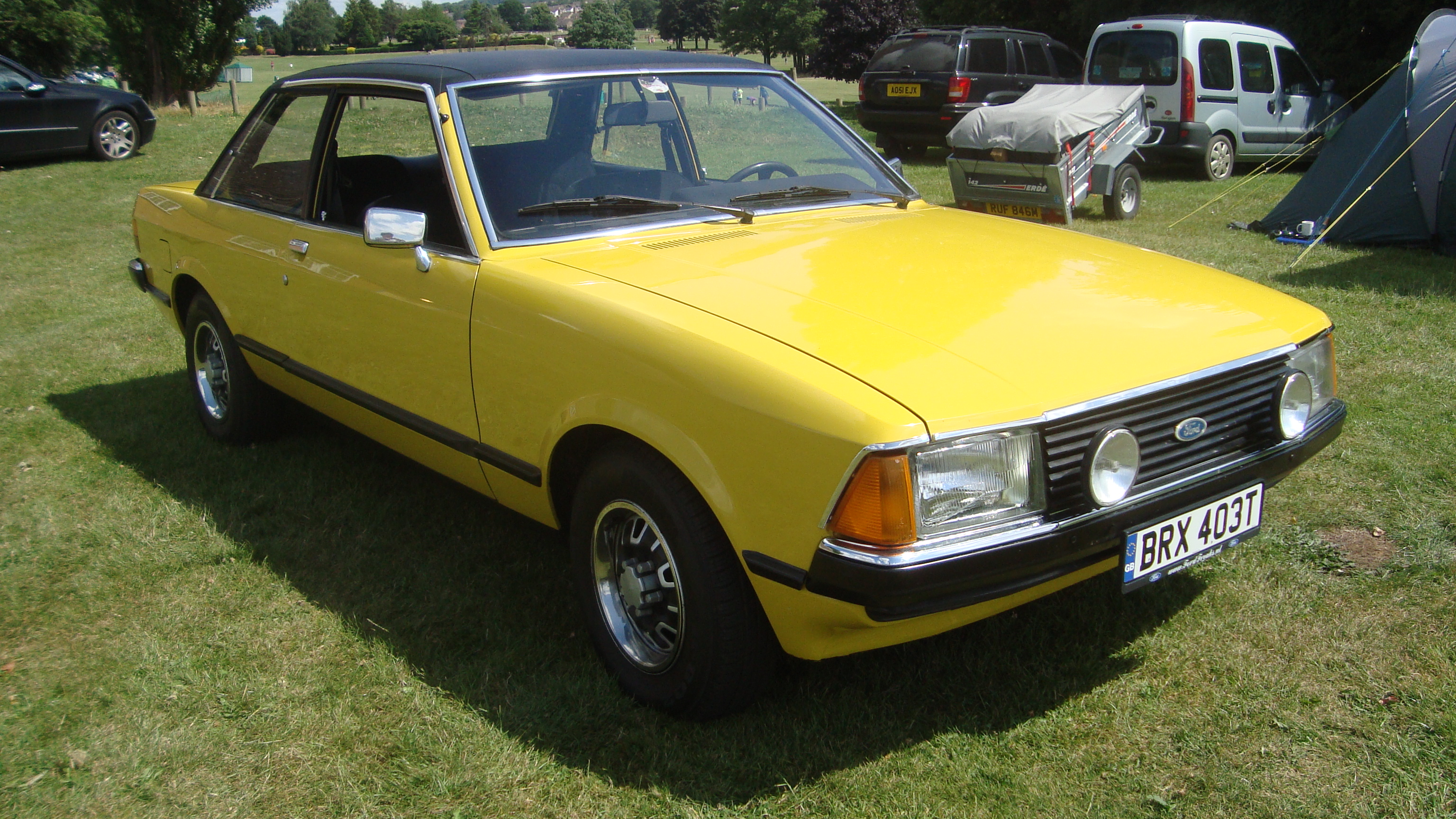
1979 Ford Granada L two-door saloon (Mark II)

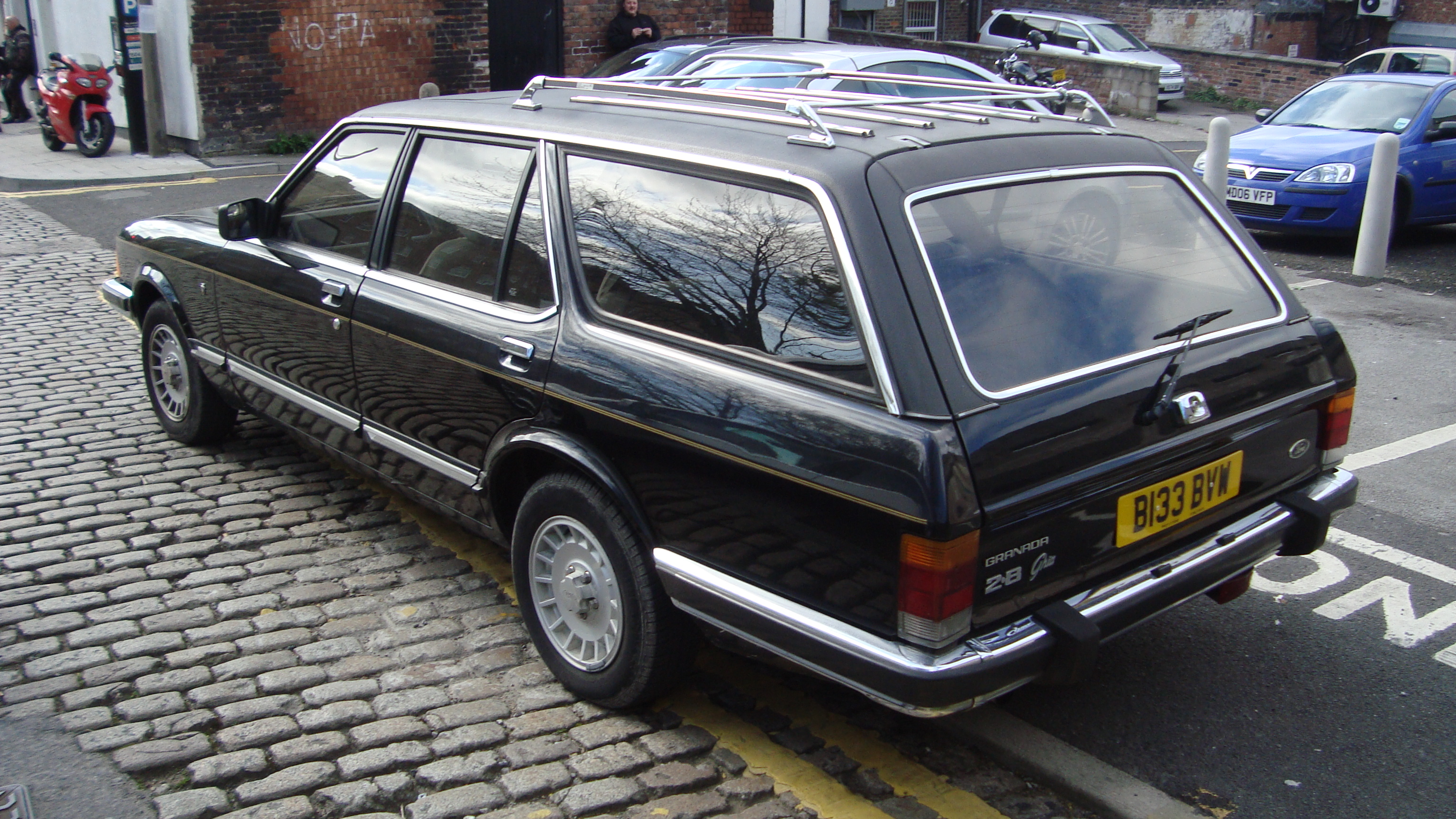
1985 Ford Granada Mark II Estate: panels from the windscreen back were carried over from the Mark I Estate

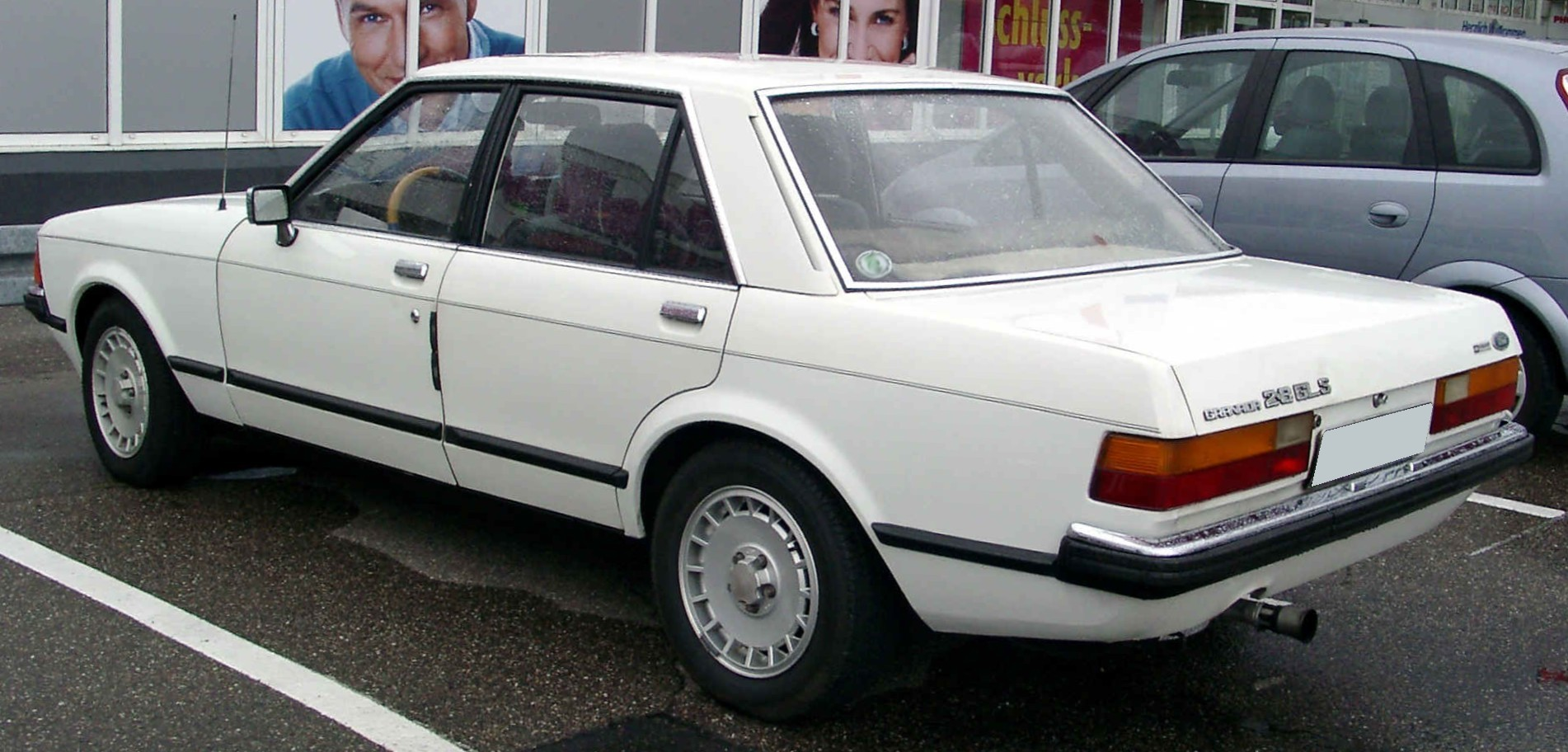
Granada 2.8 GLS, showing pre-facelift taillamp design.

The coupé was discontinued when the new model began production, although there was a two-door saloon version in certain European markets. A relatively low number of vehicles were also produced with an Indenor four-cylinder diesel engine in 1.9-, 2.1-, and 2.5-litre capacities. As their own, commercial diesel engine production lines had no extra capacity, Ford signed a contract with Peugeot to buy their 1.9 and 2.1-litre XD engines. Soon after the arrangement was complete, Peugeot announced their new, more powerful 2.3-litre iteration, which was not made available to Ford. The smallest 1.9 was quite underpowered and was soon supplanted by the somewhat more powerful 2.1, which was presented as the "Granada GLD" in March 1979 at Geneva. By 1982, this was replaced by the more capable 2.5. Originally only available as four-door saloons (the later 2.5 also as an estate), most of these went to taxi operators, and few survive.

Fuel-injected 2.8 models were originally rated at 160bhp and offered with a unique 'S' pack (based on L trim but with updated suspension, TRX wheels and tyres and spotlights) or with normal GL or Ghia trim. In 1979, the “iS” and “iGL” were replaced by the 2.8i GLS. A limited edition “Sapphire” model was also announced with slightly different trim and two tone blue over silver paintwork (strangely, the rocker panels were painted in body colour rather than matt black which made the side profile of the car look deeper and less sleek). Today early injection models are particularly rare. The 2.8i S model was immortalised by the silver vehicle used in the TV series The Sweeney. Changes for 1980 were limited to new colours and new, more comfortable seats.

The Granada was a strong seller in the UK, peaking in 1979 as the seventh best selling car with more than 50,000 sales, and also appearing in the top 10 for sales figures in 1978 and 1982. It remained the best selling car in this sector in Britain throughout its whole production run, despite competition from the likes of the Leyland Princess, Rover SD1 and Vauxhall Carlton.

Due to import restrictions, Ford was only selling the Fiesta in Spain (as it was manufactured there) in the 1970s. In 1979, Ford received authorization to sell the Granada and Taunus as well, but competing manufacturers accused Ford of selling below cost to lower tariffs. Import authorization for the Granada (as well as the Taunus) was briefly suspended but eventually reinstated with the proviso that Ford raise the sales price by fifteen percent.

Ford Australia's 1979–1982 XD series Falcon bears a strong visual resemblance to the Granada Mark II, however the only parts common to both cars are the headlamps; the Falcon being a larger car with a significantly longer wheelbase and US-derived engines and chassis architecture. In the mid-1970s, Ford Australia President Brian Inglis had taken particular interest in the development of the forthcoming Granada, and in 1976 arranged for a key member of Ford of Europe's design team, Trevor Creed, to produce a Falcon clay that reflected its design. However, by the time it reached production, the Falcon also incorporated design elements from the 1979 Ford Mustang, including a lower belt line with larger windows and a more steeply-sloped bonnet, and featured lightweight plastic bumpers. The 1981 facelift of the Granada introduced a further visual similarity, with the restyled taillamps of the saloon being of similar design to those of the XD Falcon.

=== Facelift ===
The range had a facelift in September 1981 with larger wrap-around bumpers, a three-bar body coloured grille, revised dashboard, restyled taillights, and redesigned seats which improved driver and passenger comfort. The two-door saloon was discontinued. There were also a number of detail improvements under the shell; the gearbox, clutch, and brakes were revised, the semi-trailing arm rear suspension geometry was altered, and variable rate rear springs became standard across the range. In Continental Europe the 1.7-litre V4 engine at the bottom of the lineup was replaced by the more modern, but still overworked, 1.6-litre Pinto engine. The British lineup still began with the 2-litre four. The interior remained largely the same, apart from detail changes such as new trim materials and steering wheels - the dashboard layout was altered with the heater controls now oriented vertically next to the instrument cluster to make space for the optional trip computer, and higher models in the range now featured the electronic check-light system first seen on the Escort Mk III housed within an aircraft style overhead console above the rear view mirror.

In most of Europe an even sportier looking Granada was added to the range as the Granada 2.8 Injection which had white metric-sized alloy wheels with Michelin TRX tyres, uprated suspension, Recaro seats, deep front valance and bootlid spoilers, colour coded bumpers, front spotlights and blackened trim. This model used the same 2.8 injected engine, now slightly down rated at 150 bhp (112 kW), which was usually seen in the Ghia models. Towards the end of its production run, the introduction of the 2.0 and 2.3 LX saloon and estate UK marketing packs provided lower cost versions with a slightly higher specification than the "base" L models. GL trim was also offered briefly on vehicles with 2.0 engines and Ghia trim was offered on a diesel engine model with the introduction of the 2.5 D Ghia.

A special Ford of Britain-only marketing pack edition of the Ghia X model was later introduced as the "Ford Granada Ghia X Executive" which standardised luxury appointments such as the high-grade Connolly Leather interior that had previously been an optional fitment. Further refinements such an electric slide and tilt sunroof, electric boot release on saloons, electric seat adjustment, heated seats, a trip computer, and air conditioning set the Granada Ghia X above most other cost-comparable executive cars available in the UK in the early '80s. The special "Taxi" edition was available only in black, which included a foot-operated "panic button" in the driver's footwell which would operate the alarm system. In addition to these two models, the range was complemented by estate models which reflected the same appointment levels as the entire saloon range, including the Ghia X, but not the Ghia X Executive model.

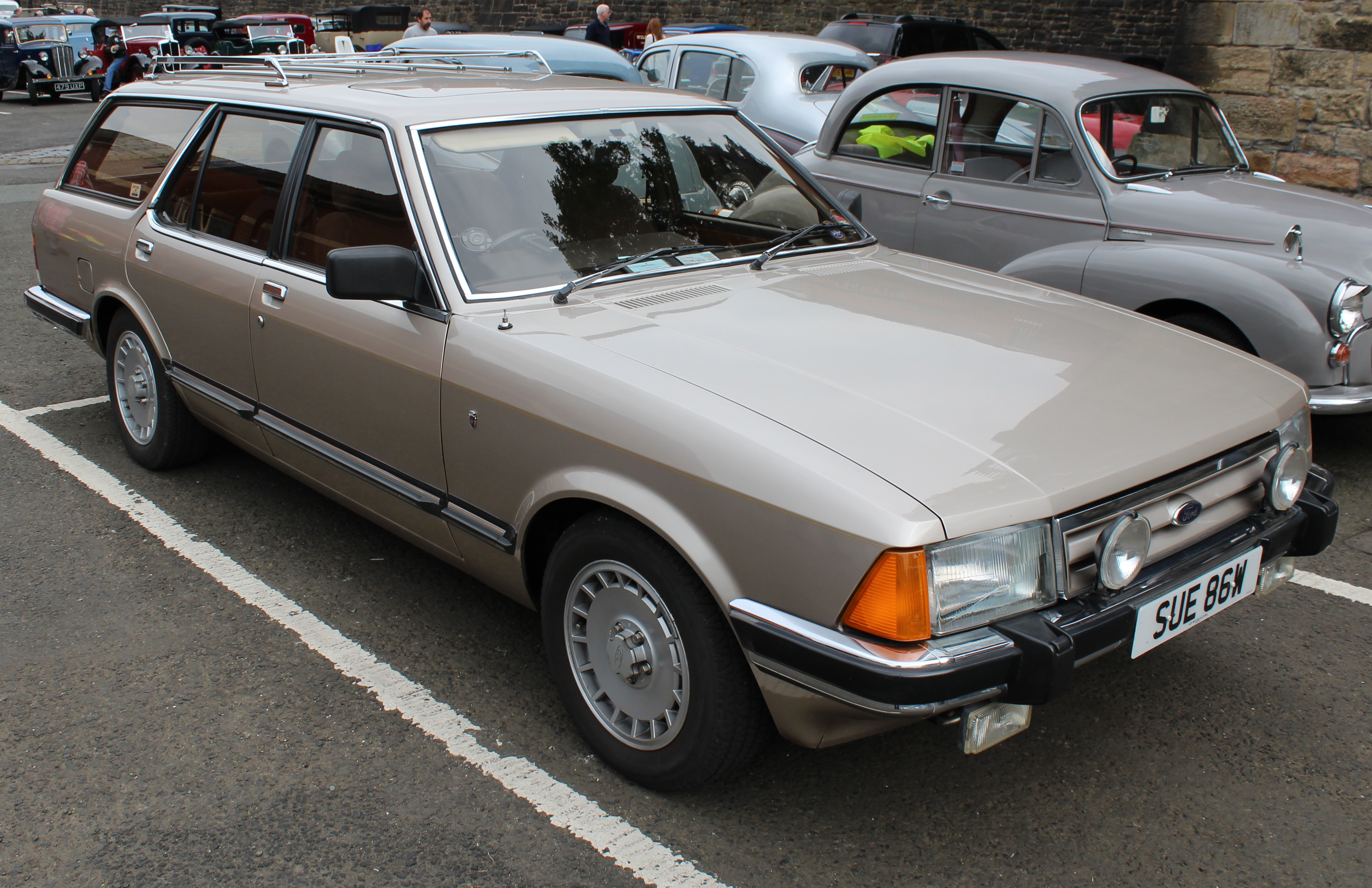
The facelifted Granada Estate

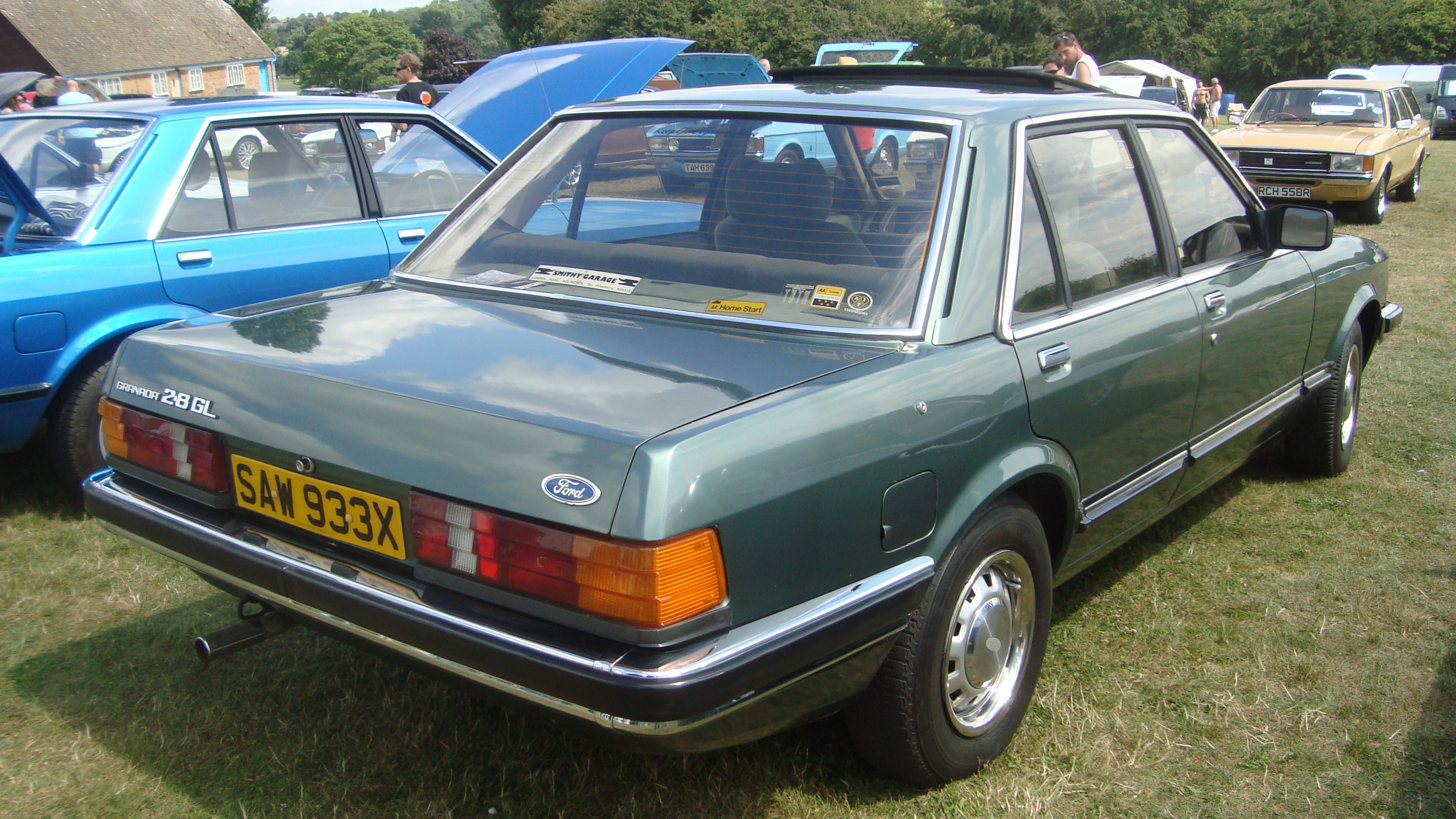
A 1982 Granada 2.8 GL, showing restyled taillamps and wraparound bumpers introduced with the facelift.

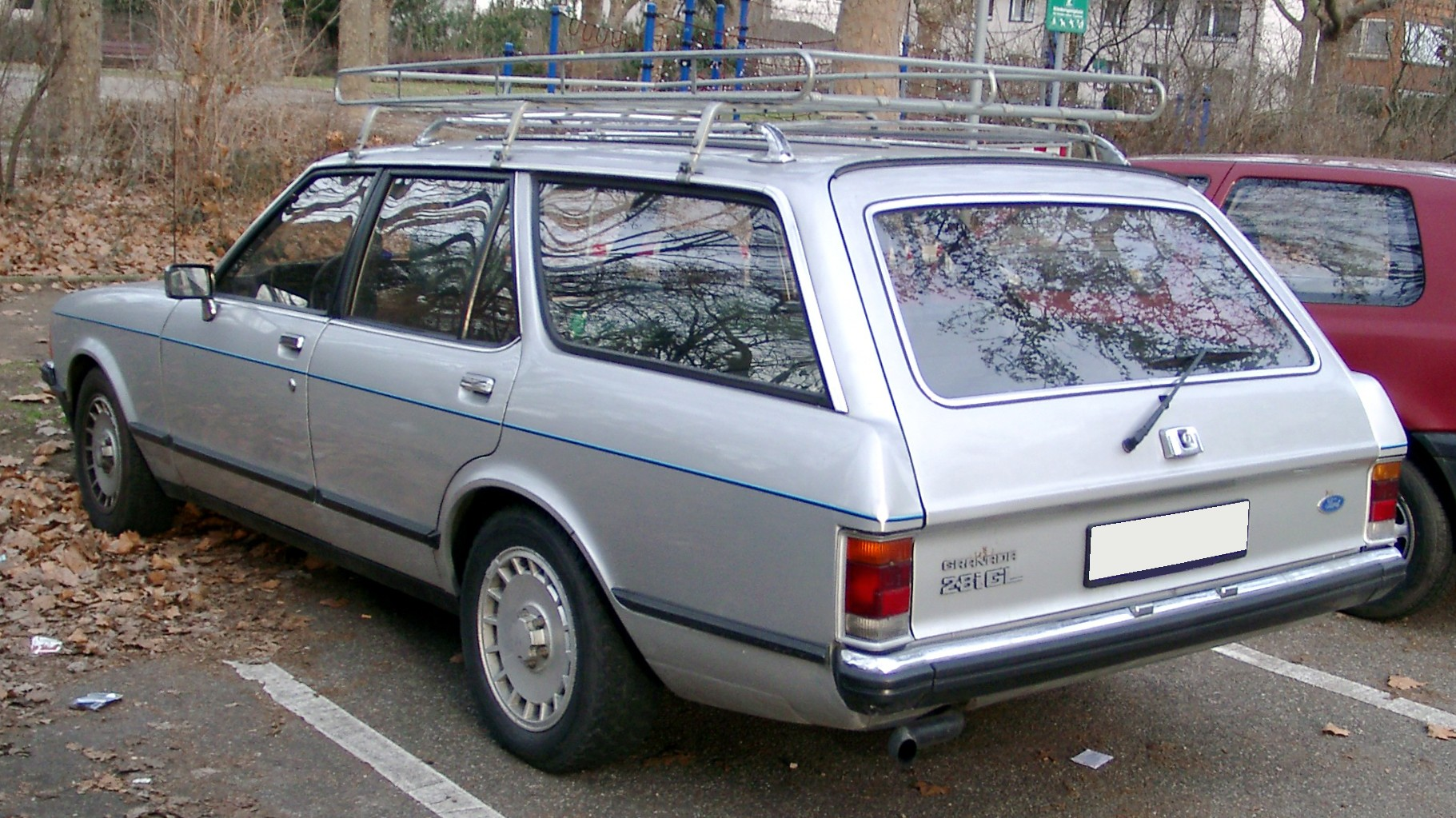
Granada Turnier 2.8i GL - the estates retained the earlier sheetmetal at the rear

=== Special models ===
Ford subcontracted assembly to Hyundai Motor Company in South Korea for sales in that market, where it continued to be sold from October 1978 to 1986, when it gave way to the Hyundai Grandeur. Production continued from stockpiled kits until December 1985, after 4,743 had been built. The car originally received a 2.0-litre V6 engine with a two-barrel Solex carburetor and four-speed manual transmission, but after the 1980 oil crisis had slowed down sales, the more economical 2-litre four-cylinder was also made available. The Granada competed with the Saehan Rekord (Royale), as well as the Peugeot 604, imported by Kia Motors. Taxes were very high on imported cars, with the Granada (and 604) landing in an even higher tax bracket for cars with wheelbases of over 2.7 metres (8 ft 10 in). Chung Mong-pil, the eldest son of Hyundai's founder Chung Ju-yung, died in a car accident in a Granada.

Additionally, hearses were offered by outside conversion companies, as well as a series of four-door limousines built by Coleman Milne. These included the slightly stretched "Minster" 15 cm, and the 68 cm longer "Dorchester" and better equipped "Grosvenor". As of autumn 1982, the Dorchester was also available in an estate version with elongated rear doors, called the "Windsor".

== Mark III (1985–1994) ==
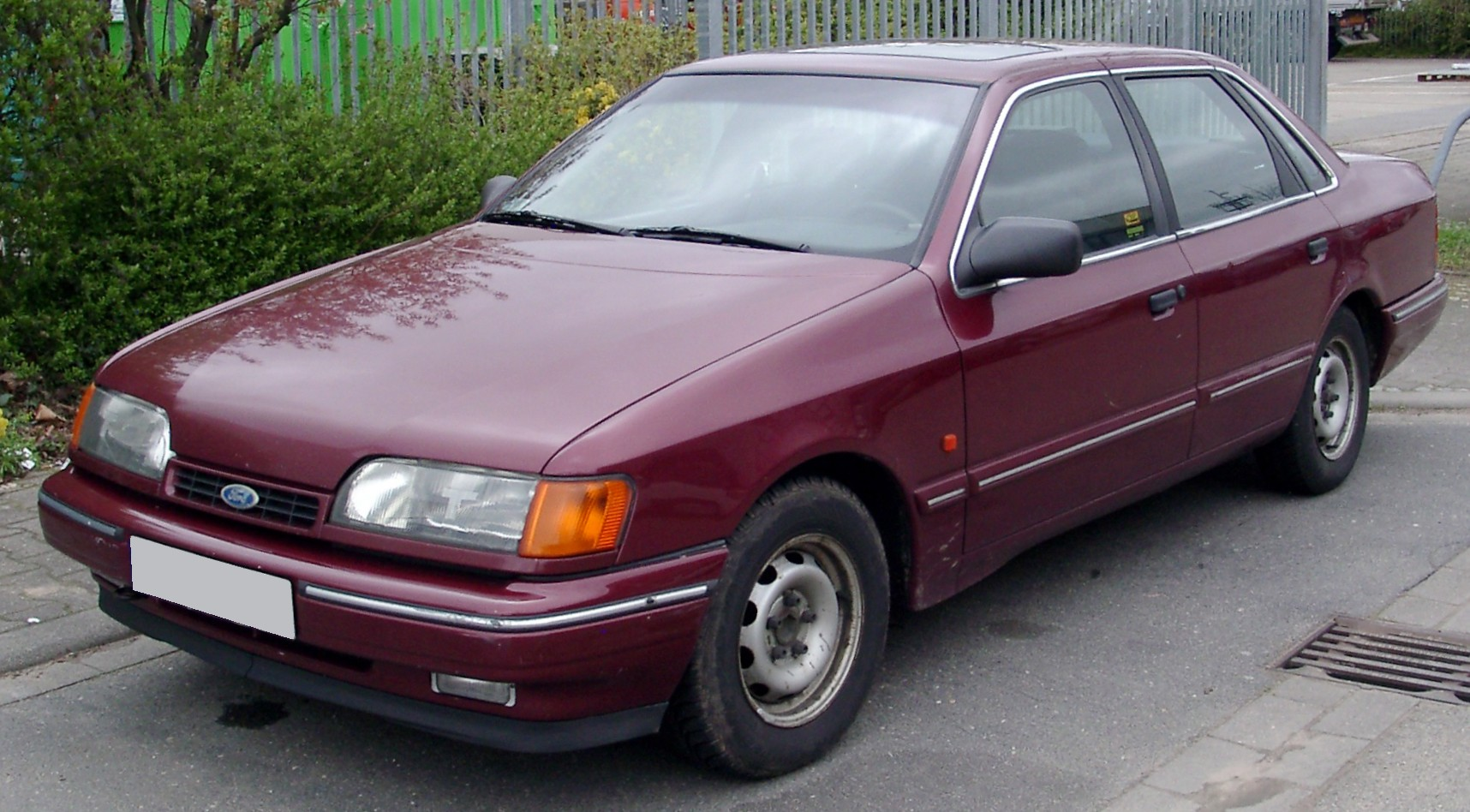
Ford Scorpio: The Scorpio was branded as a third generation "Ford Granada" for "British Isles" markets

In April 1985, the third-generation car arrived, which was essentially a rebadged Ford Scorpio, the Granada name being used in both Ireland and the United Kingdom only, with the Scorpio badge (which covered the whole range in Continental Europe) being used instead as a trim designation for the top of the range models. The Mark III Granada used a stretched Sierra floorpan and suspension, and was the first European volume production model to have antilock brakes fitted as standard across the range. It was voted European Car of the Year in 1986.

Engine options included the familiar SOHC Pinto engine, in either tax-barrier undercutting 1.8 L form, or a more powerful 2-litre version with fuel injection available. The Cologne V6 engines were carried over from the previous range in short-lived (and not much more powerful than the 2 L Pinto) 2.4 L, and 2.8 L (later 2.9 L) capacities. In 1991, a new range-topping vehicle was introduced, the Scorpio 24-valve. It featured a 2.9 L Cologne engine that had been extensively reworked by Cosworth Engineering and featured quad camshafts and 24 valves, enough for 200 bhp (150 kW). According to Ford, this gave a 0-60 mph time of 8.1 seconds and top speed of 140 mph (230 km/h).

The Ford Granada Mk III was the last car to bear the Granada badge in the UK and Ireland, being replaced in 1994 with the pan-European Scorpio. The Scorpio shared its platform doors and roof with the Mk III Granada. The styling of the nose and tail sections were updated to match the ovoid designs being used across the Ford range in the 1990s. On the Scorpio, this resulted in a controversial design. After a 1998 redesign, it was taken out of production the same year with total European sales being 95,587 units.

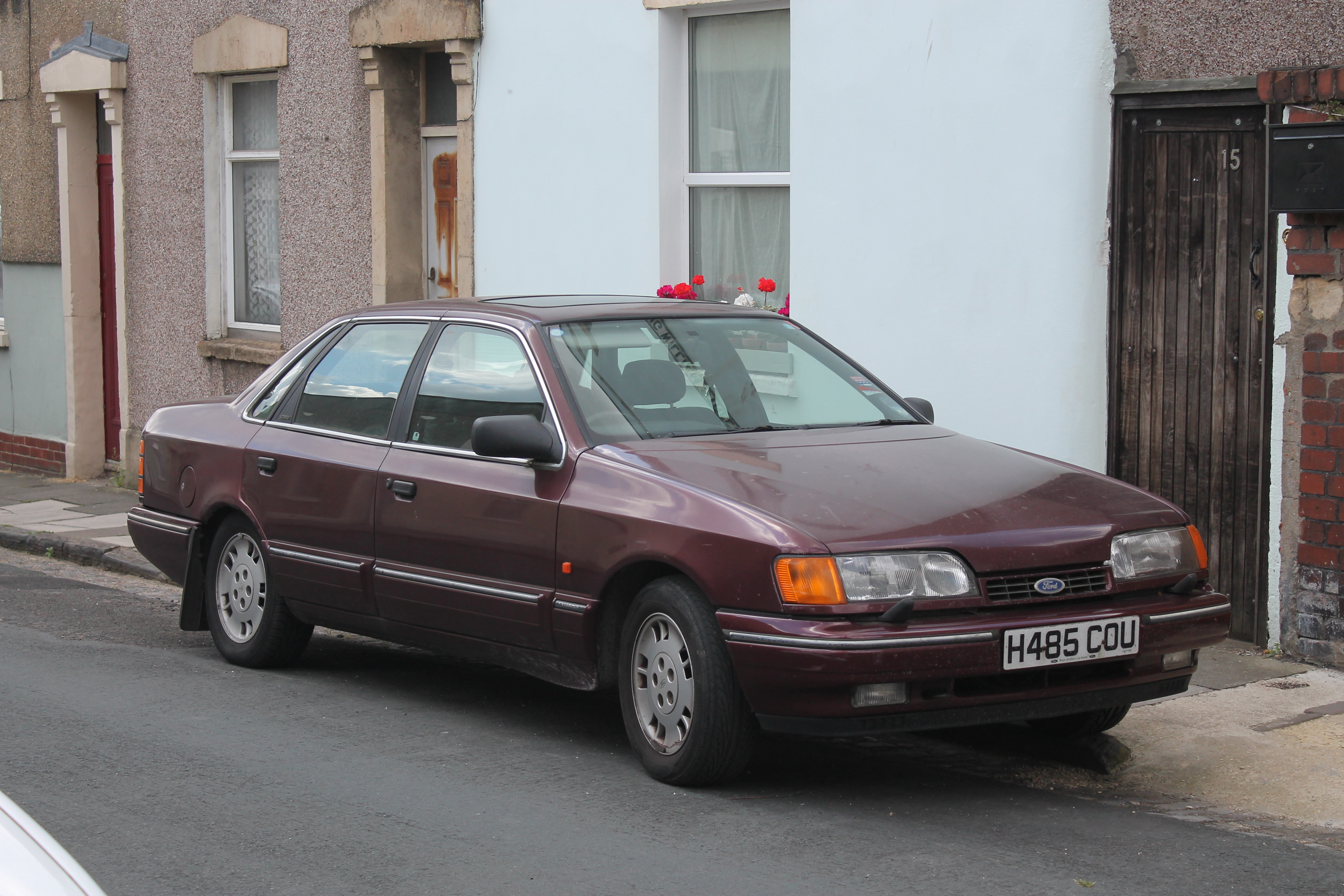
1991 Ford Granada Scorpio 2.0 Saloon (Mark III)

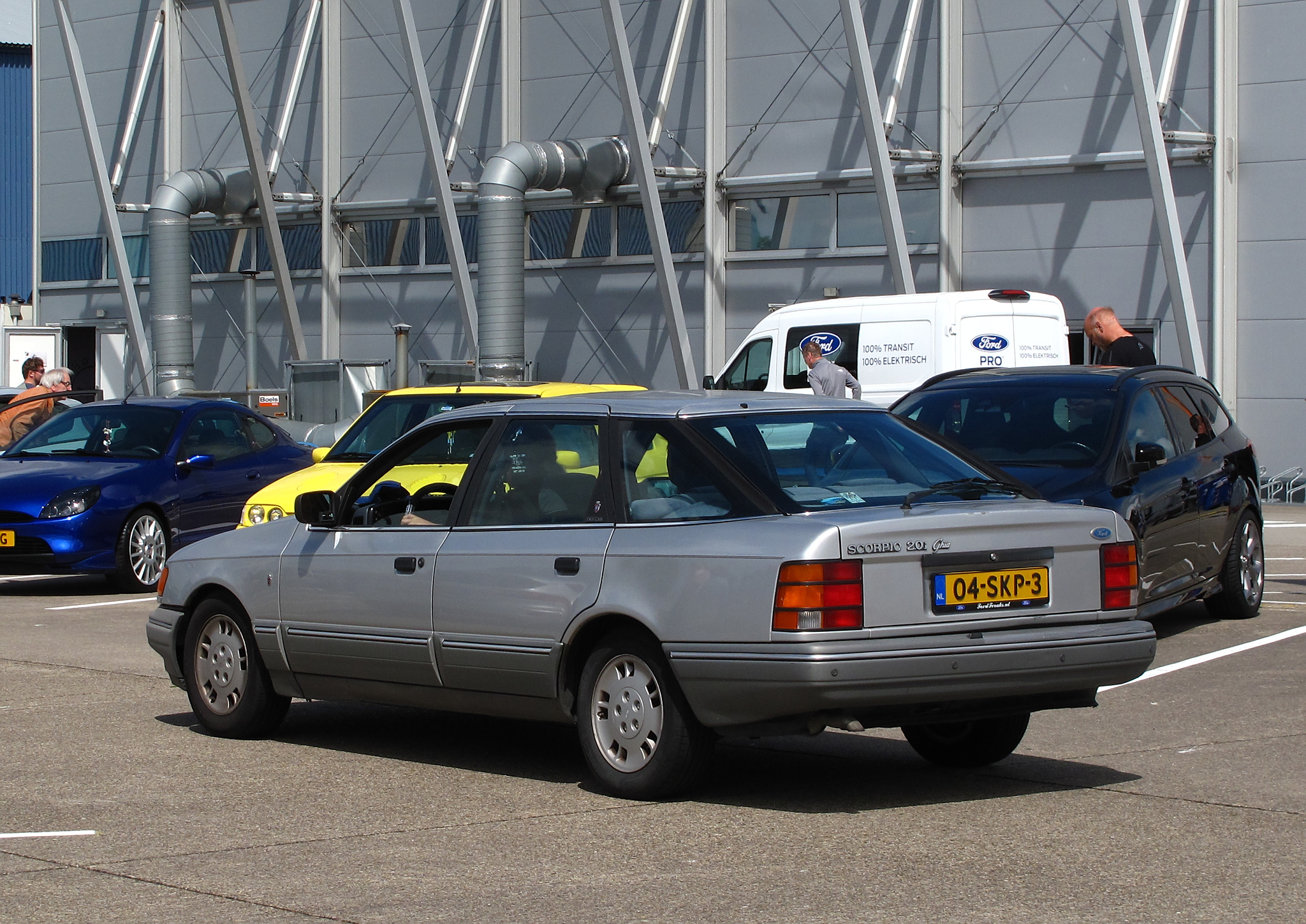
1989 Ford Scorpio 2.0i Ghia (Mark III) rear

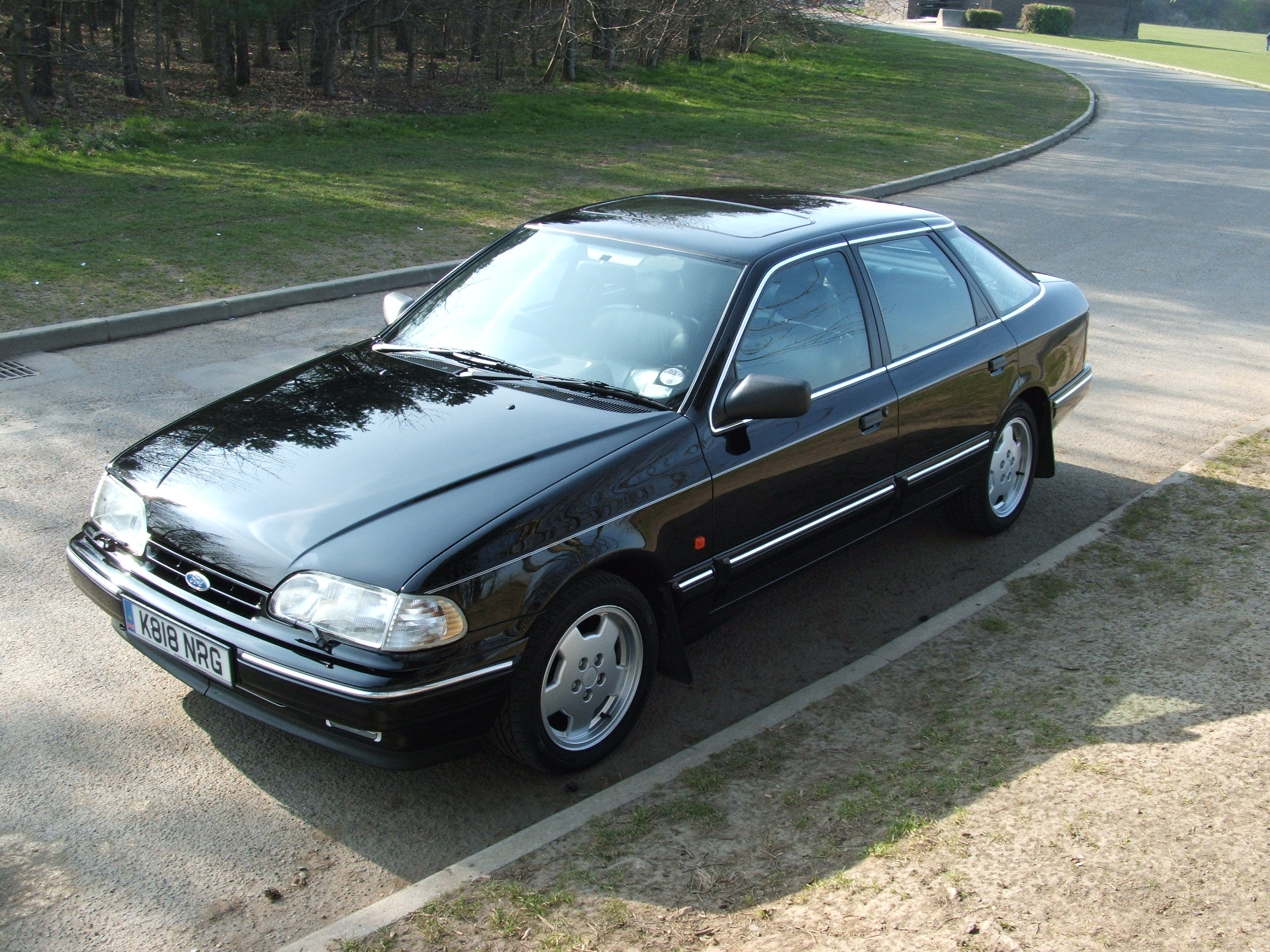
Ford Granada Mark III 24v Cosworth

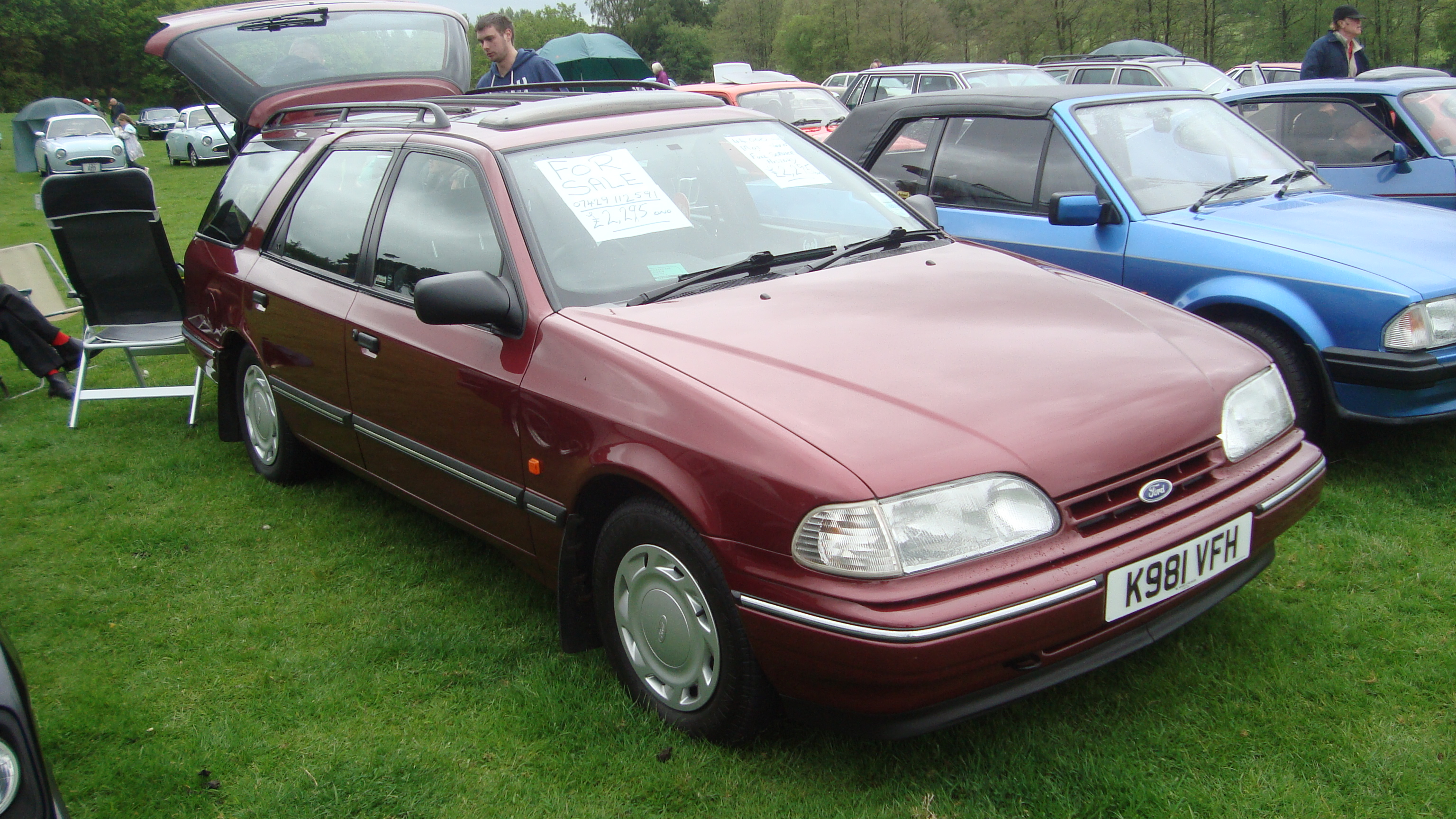
1993 Ford Granada 2.0 LXi Estate (Mark III)

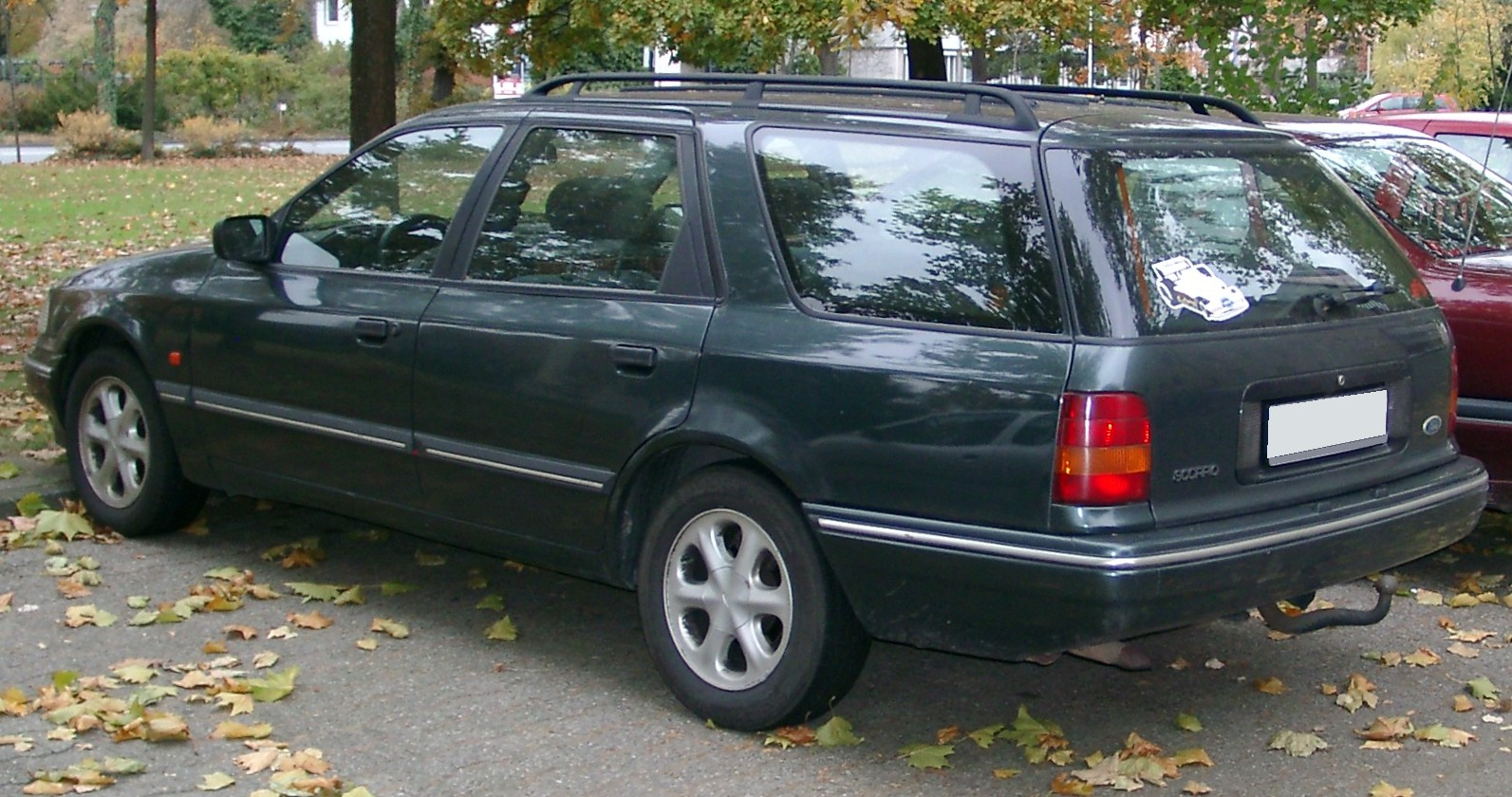
Ford Granada Estate (Mark III) rear
