= Perana Performance Group =

- Industry: Automotive
- Founded: 2007
- Headquarters: Gqeberha, South Africa
- Products: Z-one
- Website: web.archive.org/web/20120217172244/http://www.perana.com/

The Perana Performance Group was a South African car developer located in Gqeberha. It is the second manufacturer that uses the Perana brand name after the famous Basil Green Motors. The company was founded in late 2007. The cars were manufactured in the Hi-Tech plant of Hi-Tech Automotive & Superformance.

By 2012, Superformance partnered with AC Cars and the Perana was renamed the AC 378 GT Zagato. Reportedly there were about ten pre-production models completed.

== Description ==
The company was founded in Port Elizabeth in 2007. The brand name was Perana. There was no connection to Basil Green Motors, which had previously been known as the tuning brand Perana.

It is not known when production ended. The last version of the company's website with meaningful content dates from February 2012.

In March 2012, it was announced that the vehicle would be marketed under the AC brand as the AC 378 GT.

== Models ==
=== The Z-One ===
The Z-one prototype was first presented to the public at the Geneva Motor Show in 2009. Designed by Italian automotive design studio Zagato, the supercar is based on the chassis of the Chevrolet Corvette (C6), an American sports car. The coupé had room for two people.

A V8 engine with a displacement of 6200 cm³ and an output of 323 kW drove the rear wheels.

The vehicle, with a wheelbase of 2540 mm , was 4406 mm long, 1924 mm wide, and 1233 mm high. Its curb weight was given as 1465 kg.

Series production of the Perana Z-One was to take place at Hi-Tech Automotive. The price in Europe was expected to be just under £ 50,000 (excluding taxes). In the USA, the price was expected to be $100,000 from August 2010.

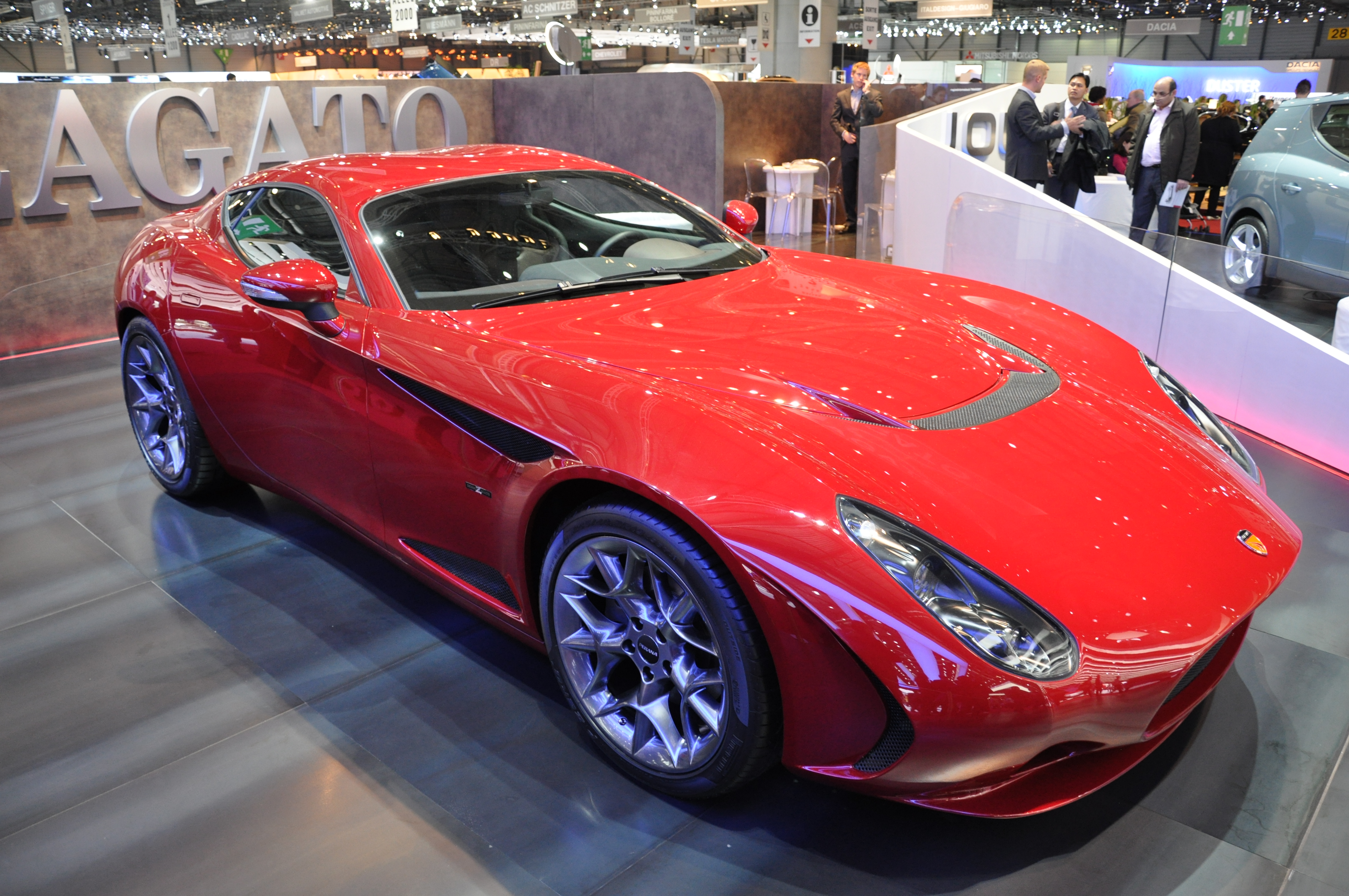
Zagato Z-One Concept Car

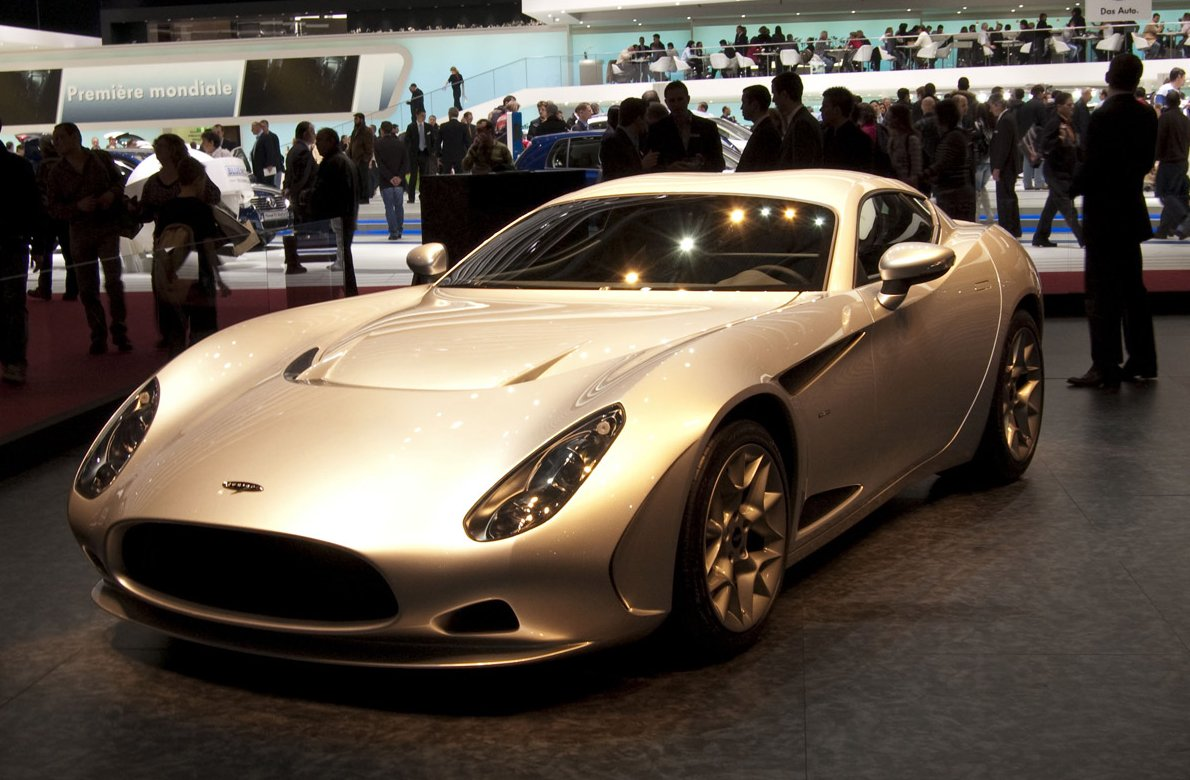
Perana Z-One Production Model (Front)

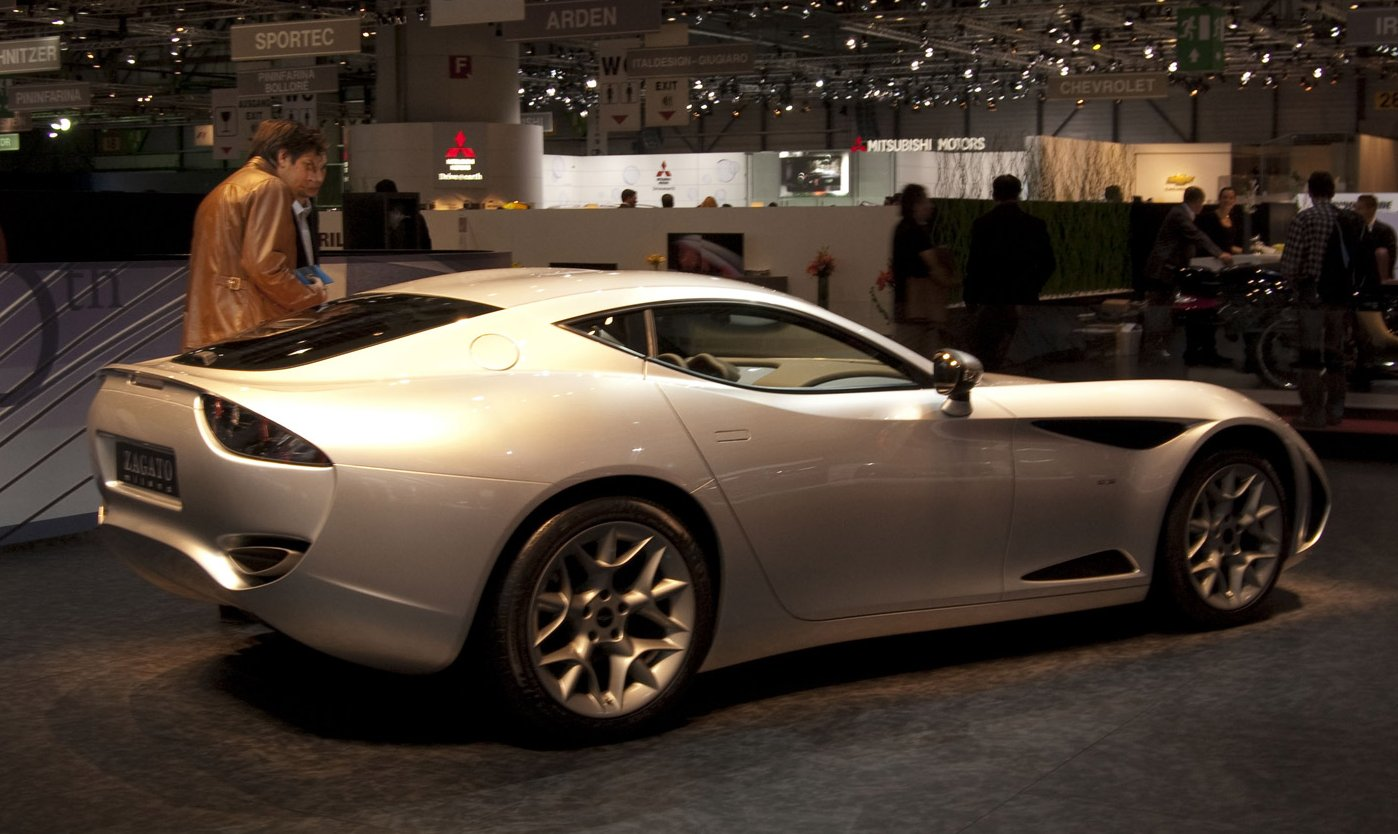
Perana Z-One Production Model (Rear)
