= RW Kit Cars =

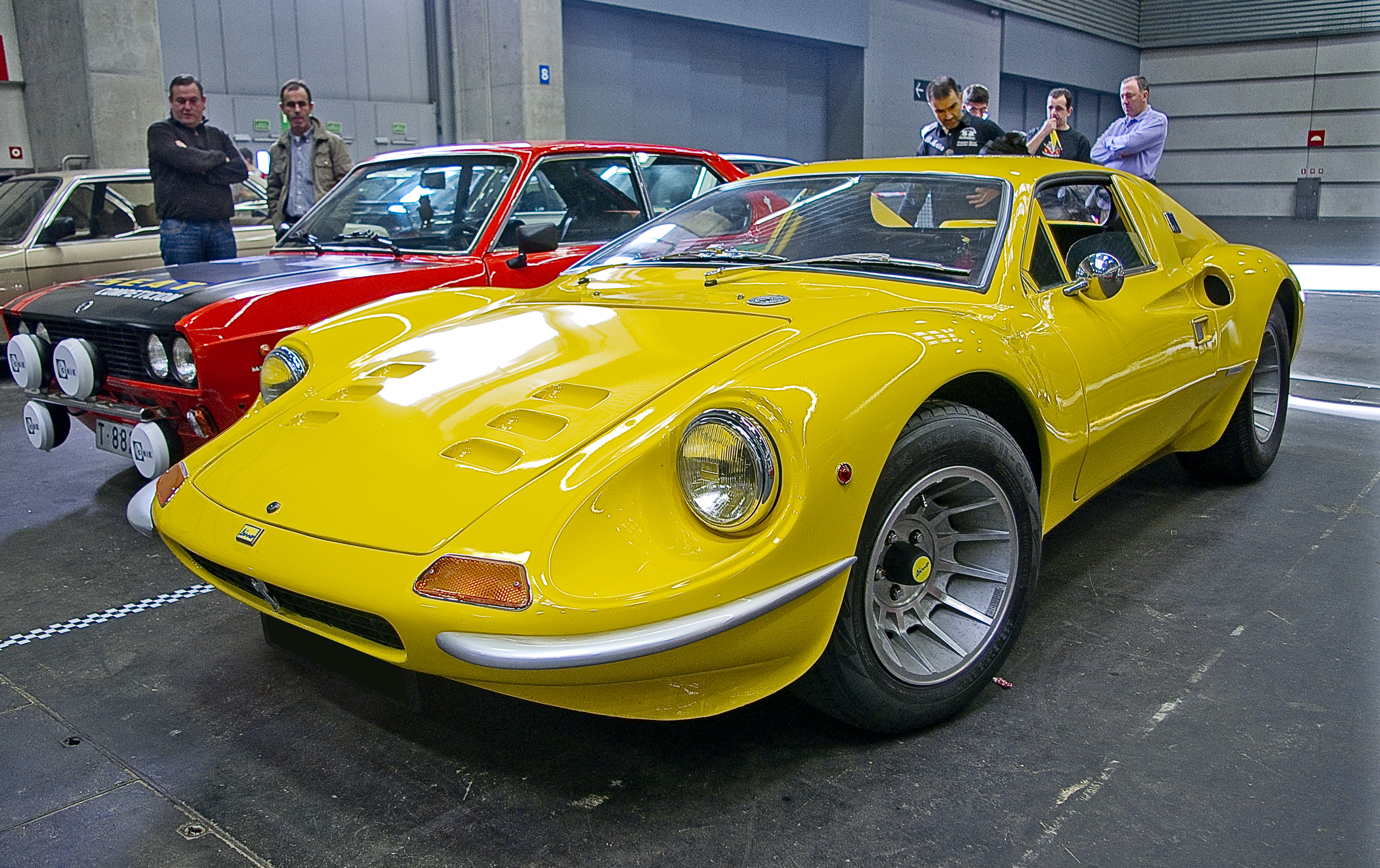
- RW Karma, a Ferrari Dino 246 GT replica
- Company type: Private
- Industry: Motoring
- Founded: 1983
- Founder: Roger Woolley
- Defunct: 2000
- Headquarters: Melton Mowbray, Leicestershire, England
- Products: Motor cars

RW Kit Cars Ltd. was an English manufacturer of kit cars, founded in 1983 by Roger Woolley.

== Vehicles ==
=== RW Karma ===
In 1984 RW Kit Cars took over Perry Automotive Development's Karma project. Perry had been manufacturing the Karma, which was designed by Custom Classics of California, since 1982. It is a fibreglass copy of the Ferrari Dino 246 GT, built around the floor pan of a Volkswagen Beetle, a popular choice of donor vehicle at the time. RW continued to sell the VW-based car, but also added a new backbone chassis that allowed the engine to be mid-mounted and Ford components to be used as an alternative to the VW option.

=== RW Chopper ===
The Chopper is a tricycle powered by a VW Beetle engine. It was produced from 1983 until 1984, during which time about five were made.

=== RW Taurus ===
The Taurus is a Lamborghini Countach replica based on the VW Beetle. It was manufactured from 1984 until 1985, during which time about 32 were produced, most of them exported to Germany.

=== RW 427 ===
The 427 is a replica of the AC Cobra, manufactured from 1988 until 1990. About 28 were built, 18 of them with a front engine and rear-wheel drive configuration, and 10 for export to France based on the VW floor pan.
