= Basil Green Motors =

Basil Green Motors (VIN: BG) is a former car manufacturer and racing team which is located in Edenvale, Gauteng near Johannesburg, South Africa. The company has specialised in Ford vehicles, in which the manufacturer's models are recognised by the brand name Perana added to the model name. The name Perana is a deliberate misspelling, as Piranha already had been protected. Currently the company is active as a dealer of Ford and Mazda vehicles.

Founded in 1967 by Basil Green the company dealt with engine tuning of Ford vehicles and participated in a variety of races as racing team. After winning several races the Ford Motor Company became aware of the company and used the company for some of the South African models as a kind of in-house tuner.

== Cortina Mk II ==
Gunston Cortina
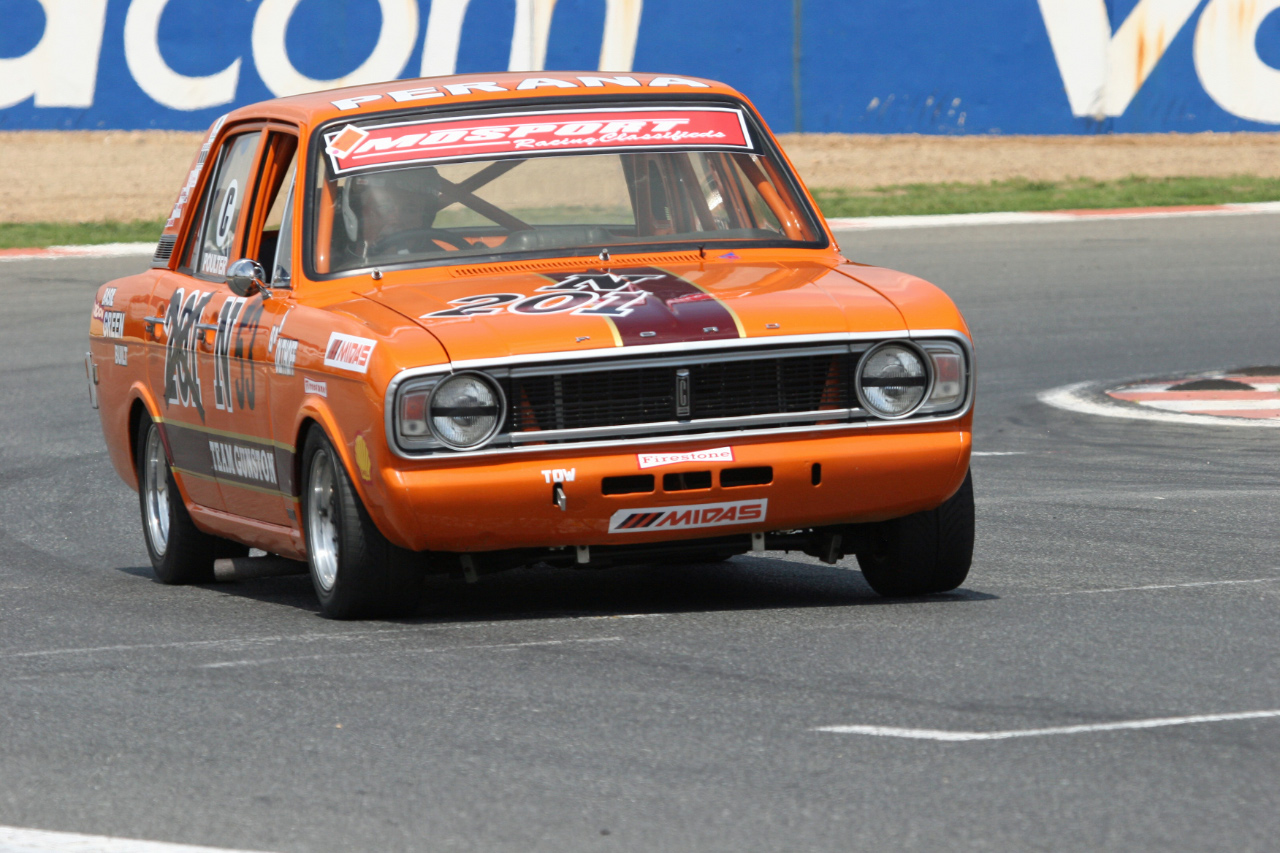
- Ford Cortina Gunston Perana

Overview
- Manufacturer: Basil Green Motors
- Production: 1967–1972
- Assembly: South Africa

Body and chassis
- Body style: 4-door saloon

The first model of the manufacturer was the Ford Cortina Perana V6, which was launched in 1967 as a tuning model. Production began one year later in the summer. Grosvenor Motors, then the largest Ford dealer in South Africa, took over the sales. The price was 2950 Rand. The standard version was based on the Ford Cortina Mk II GT. For the units ordered by the Gunston Cigarette Company, the Ford Cortina XL was used as basis. The Ford Essex engine with 2994 cc was used as engine. This was taken from the Ford Zephyr as well as the powertrain. After the conversion and lowering the Cortina Perana V6 was 64 kg heavier than the Ford standard model. Recognition features of the Cortina Perana V6 are a black strip over the bonnet, a black front grille and black coloured rims.

== Escort Mk I ==
Escort Perana
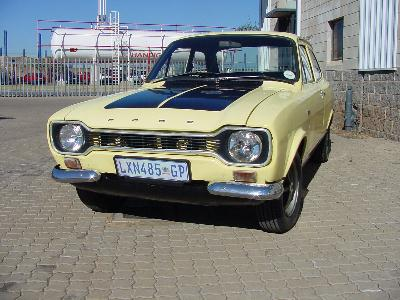
- Ford Escort Perana

Overview
- Manufacturer: Basil Green Motors
- Production: 1968 – ?
- Assembly: South Africa

Body and chassis
- Body style: 2-door saloon

The second model of the manufacturer was 1968 the sports car Ford Escort Perana. Ford wanted to use the RS 1600, but the Cosworth BDA engine proved too complex for South Africa. So Basil Green made new plans and fitted the four cylinder engine of the Ford Pinto.

The removed RS 1600 engines Basil Green sold for 695 Rand as ideal for among others the Escort.

== Capri Mk I ==
Capri Perana
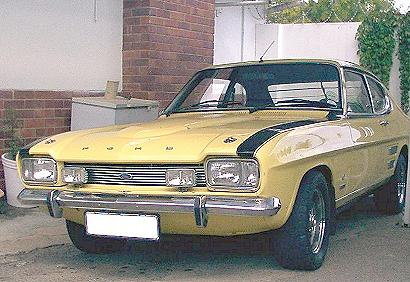
- Ford Capri Perana V8

Overview
- Manufacturer: Ford of South Africa
- Production: 1969–1973
- Assembly: South Africa

Body and chassis
- Body style: Coupé

The next model, the Ford Capri Perana came out in 1969 as V6 version. About 20 units of this model were built; the top speed was 186 km/h. As Ford offered the Essex engine as standard from 1970 on, Basil Green had to take a more powerful engine. So he replaced the V6 with the Windsor V8 of the Ford Mustang.

Technically the Capri Perana was a mix of the Australian Ford Falcon (XW) and the American Ford Mustang. It was sold with a 4 speed Ford Toploader transmission and the 3 speed C4 automatic transmission. In the beginning the price for this car was 4,450 Rand.

Top speed was 228 km/h, acceleration from 0 to 100 km/h was possible in 6.7 seconds (automatic version 7.0 sec).

Officially the Capri Perana was only sold in "Bright Yellow" and "Piri Piri Red", but some cars were painted in different colours, for example Basil Green's Perana naturally was green.

The cars were manufactured by Ford of South Africa (a subsidiary of the Ford Motor Company of Canada). Production ended in 1973.

=== Racing ===
Gunston Perana
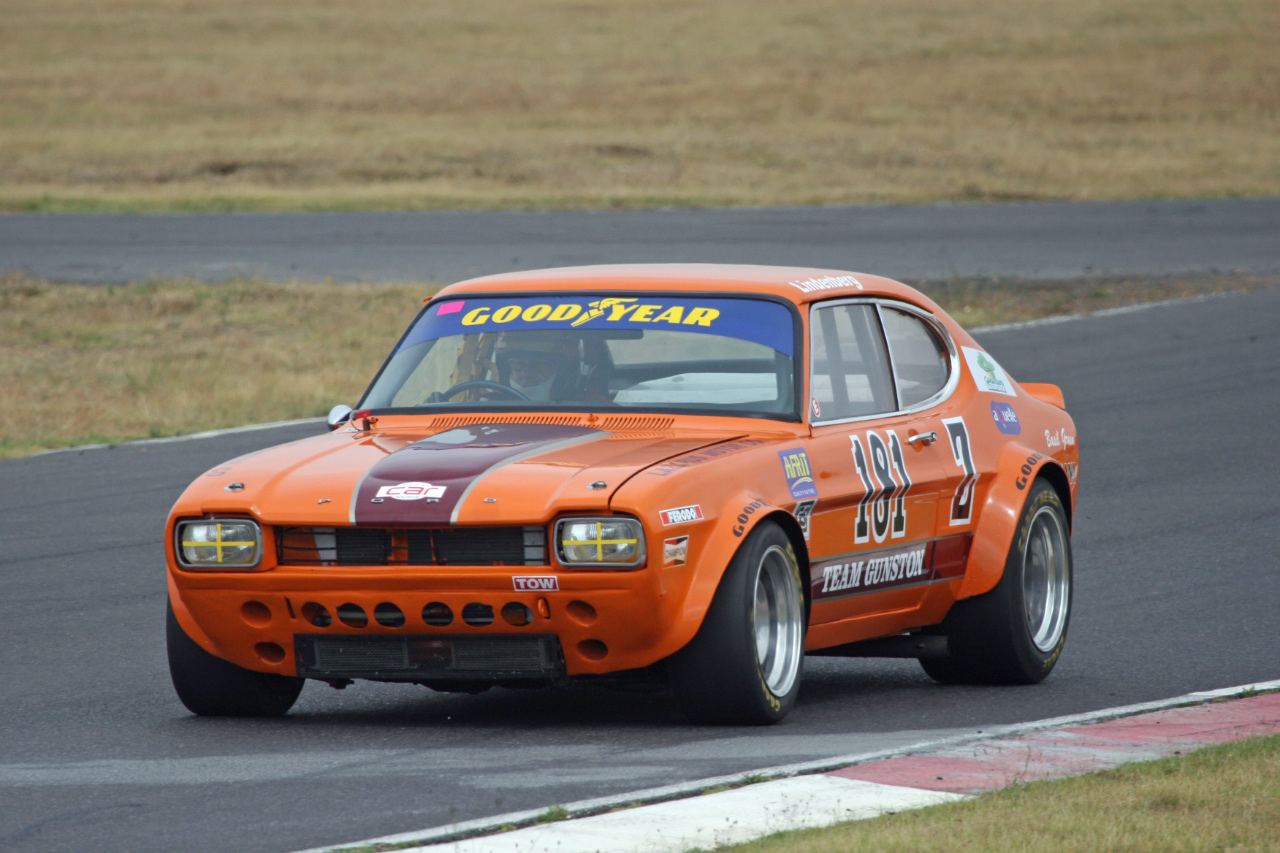
- Gunston Perana V8

Overview
- Manufacturer: Basil Green Motors
- Production: 1969 – ?
- Assembly: South Africa

Body and chassis
- Body style: Coupé

Based on the Capri Perana V8 racing cars were built for the South African Saloon Car Championship. The Z 181 was the only Group 5 car and won 13 of 14 races in the 1970 season and topped the lap records on every course.

After a change of the rules to stop this dominance, Basil Green built 6 cars for the Group 2. One of these cars won the championship in 1971, the A2 in 1972.

Z 181 and A2 were sponsored by the Gunston Cigarette Company, while the others were driven by private drivers. Technical modifications were made, especially to the engine. It received 4x48 down draft twin choke Weber carburetors and could muster 400 hp. Top speed was more than 250 km/h. Brakes remained identical to those of the V6 Capris, albeit with racing pads fitted. C-shaped single leaf springs were used at the rear axle to allow room for the 14.5" rims.

Z 181 is owned by the Scribante family in South Africa. A2 was found in Rhodesia and rebuilt by a collector near Cape Town. One of the other cars had an accident at the Kyalami Grand Prix Circuit with Basil Green at the wheel and was never rebuilt. What happened to the other cars is not known.

== Cortina Mk III ==
When the Cortina Mk III came out Basil Green brought the second generation of the Cortina Perana V6 on the South-African market in 1972. These models, also known as Cortina Big Six, received the same engines as their predecessors.

== Granada Mk I ==
Granada V8
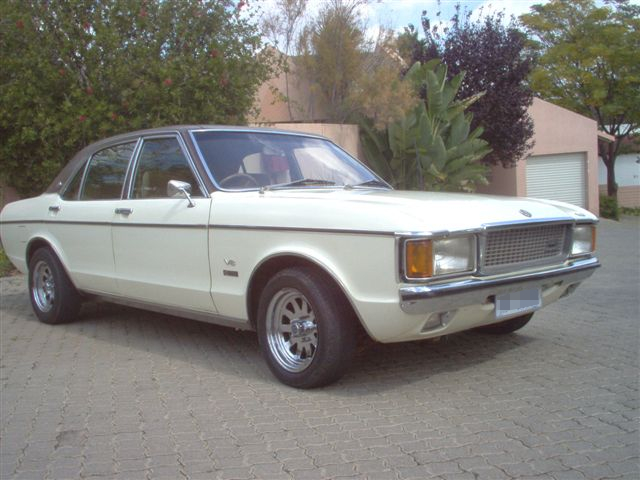
- Ford Granada V8

Overview
- Manufacturer: Basil Green Motors
- Production: 1973–1977
- Assembly: South Africa

Introduced in 1973 the Ford Granada V8 is the only model by Basil Green Motors not getting the Perana moniker. The engine was the Windsor V8 with 302 cui (5 litres) coupled with an automatic or manual gearbox. With a top speed of 207 km/h and a 0-100 km/h acceleration of 7.8 seconds the car became the favourite of Ford's chairman Lee Iacocca. Ford Cologne purchased two of these cars to see if they were suitable for the European market, but the oil crisis of 1973 led the plans for importation to be cancelled.

== Escort XR3 ==
After years without a change in the model range Basil Green Motors presented the Escort XR3 in 1980. For the first time in corporate history the performance increase was not by a change of the engine but classic tuning like another carburettor. Maximum speed of the Perana XR3 was 183 km/h.

== Sapphire ==
Two years later Basil Green Motors presented the Ford Sapphire Perana. A few years later this car was produced by Samcor to satisfy the demand. The Sapphire was available in 3.0 litre (222 km/h) and a 3.4-litre (236 km/h) versions, with the latter having been produced by JT Developments.

== Videos ==
- Ford Capri Perana V8 at a 1/4-mile run on the Santa Pod Raceway
