= Floorpan =

Floor plate of a vehicle

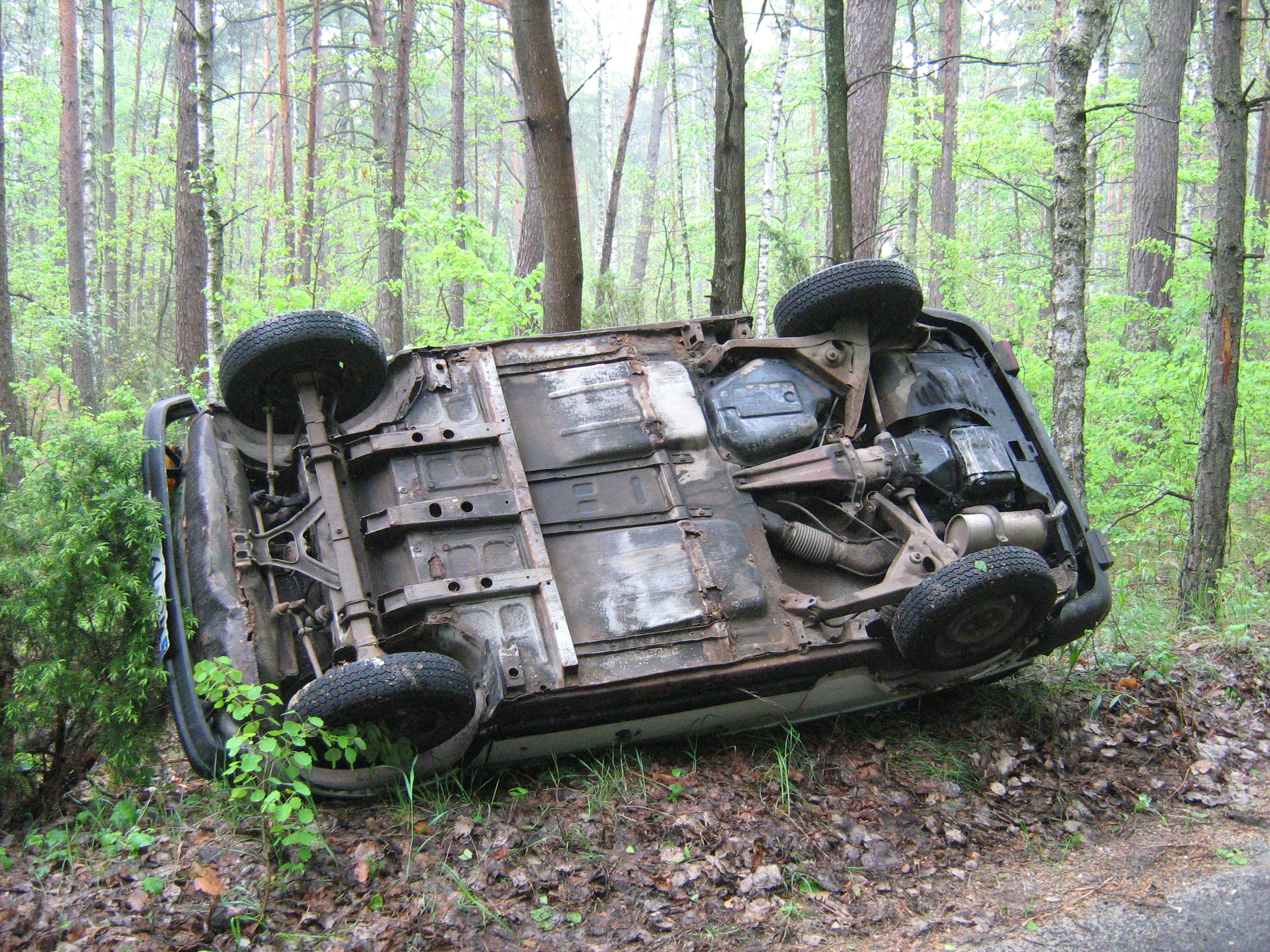
Floorpan forming the chassis to which structural and mechanical components are attached.

The floorpan is a large sheet metal stamping that often incorporates several smaller welded stampings to form the floor of a large vehicle and the position of its external and structural panels. In the case of monocoque designs, the floorpan is the most important metal part establishing the chassis, body, and thus the car's size. It serves as the foundation of most of the structural and mechanical components of an unibody automobile to which the powertrain, suspension system, and other parts are attached.

The term is also applied to the smaller stamped panels that form the floors inside a vehicle, as well as the bottom of the trunk.

== See also ==
- Automobile platform
