= Ford Scorpio =

Executive car produced by Ford (1985–1998)

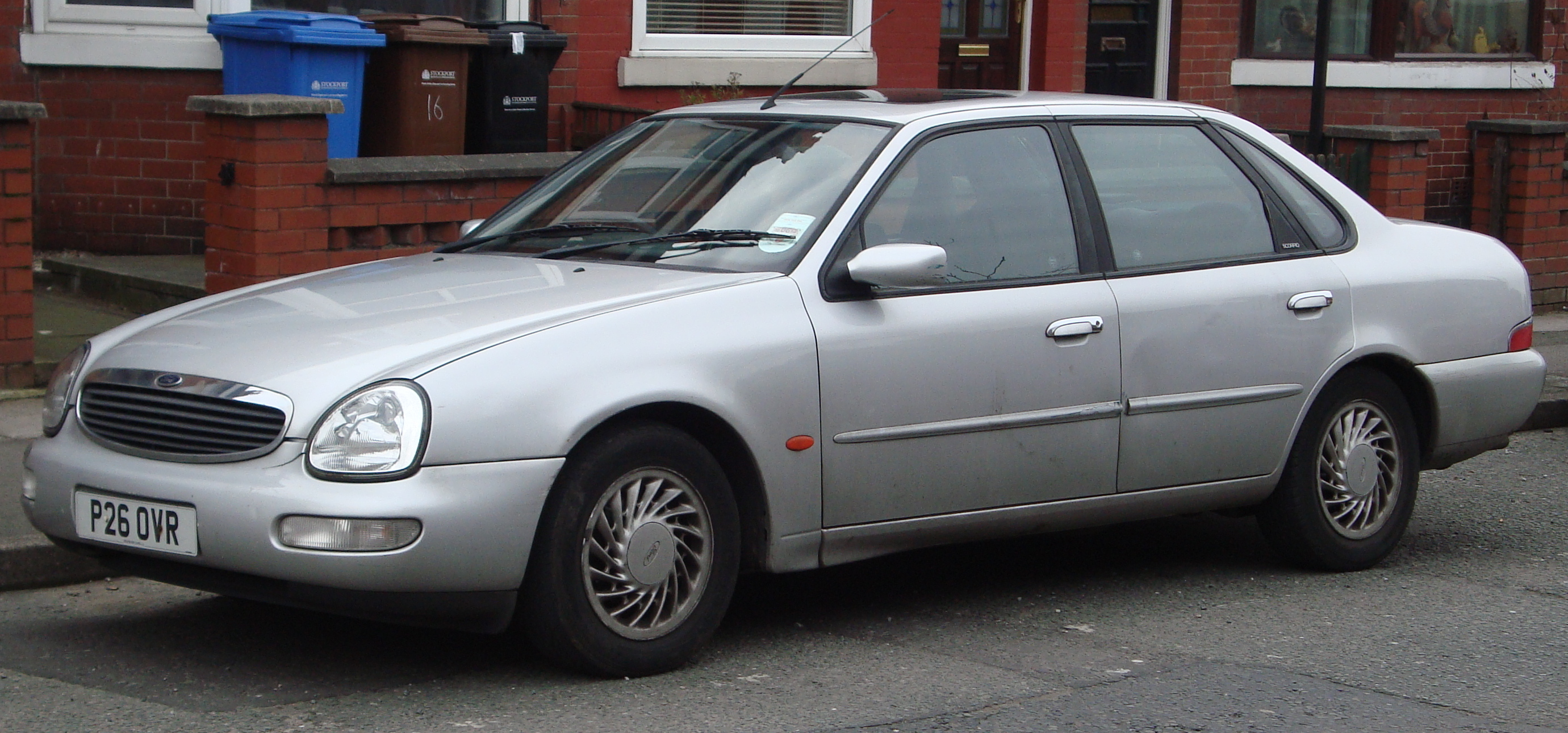

Overview
- Manufacturer: Ford Europe
- Production: 1985–1998
- Assembly: Germany: Cologne (Cologne Body & Assembly)

Body and chassis
- Class: Executive car (E)
- Layout: Front-engine, rear-wheel-drive (1985–1998); Front-engine, four-wheel-drive (1985–1994)

Chronology
- Predecessor: Ford Granada

The Ford Scorpio is an executive car that was produced by Ford Germany from 1985 to 1998. It was the replacement for the European Ford Granada line (although in the UK and Ireland the Scorpio was badged "Granada" until 1994). Like its predecessor, the Scorpio was targeted at the executive car market. A variant known as the Merkur Scorpio was sold briefly on the North American market during the late 1980s. While Ford's Taurus was of a similar size, Ford maintained the need for two parallel cars – while Scorpio buyers valued high-speed stability, a tight turning radius, and a sizable rear seat, American buyers had other requirements.

== First generation (1985–1994) ==
First generation
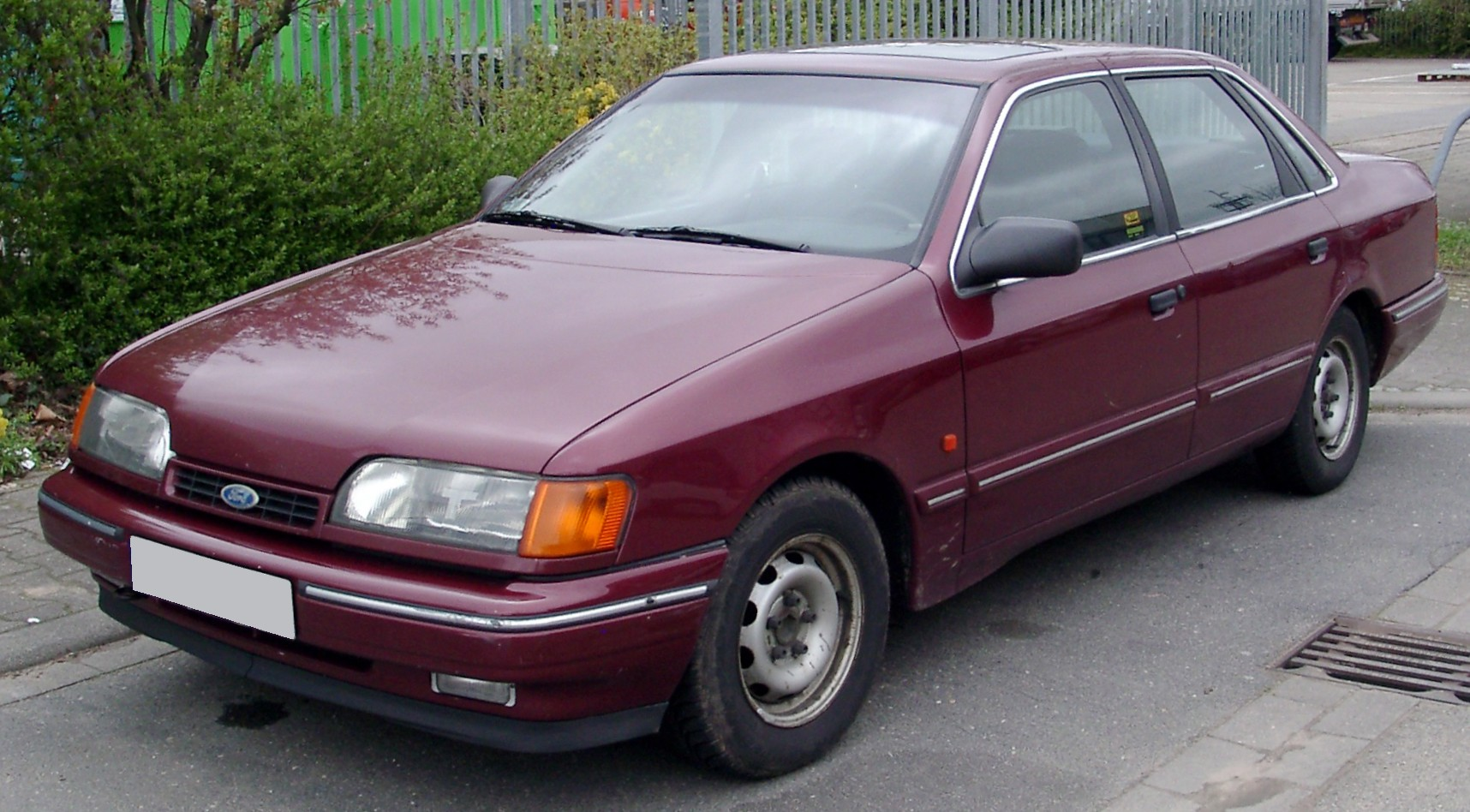
- Ford Scorpio Mk I Saloon (1989–1992)

Overview
- Also called: Ford Granada; Merkur Scorpio
- Production: 1985–1994
- Designer: Uwe Bahnsen; James Kelly

Body and chassis
- Body style: 4-door saloon 5-door hatchback 5-door estate
- Layout: Front-engine, rear-wheel-drive / four wheel drive
- Platform: Ford DE-1 platform

Powertrain
- Engine: Petrol: 1.8 L Pinto OHC I4; 2.0 L Pinto OHC I4; 2.0 L Ford DOHC DOHC I4; 2.4 L Cologne OHV V6; 2.8 L Cologne OHV V6; 2.9 L Cologne OHV V6; 2.9 L Cosworth BOA DOHC V6; Diesel: 2.5 L Peugeot XD3 OHV I4; 2.5 L Peugeot XD3T OHV turbo I4; 2.5 L VM 425 OHV turbo I4
- Transmission: 5-speed Type 9 manual 5-speed MT-75 manual 4-speed A4LD automatic

Dimensions
- Wheelbase: 2,761 mm (108.7 in)
- Length: 4,673 mm (184.0 in) (hatchback); 4,744 mm (186.8 in) (sedan and estate)
- Width: 1,760 mm (69.3 in)
- Height: 1,440 mm (56.7 in)
- Curb weight: 1,380 kg (3,042 lb)

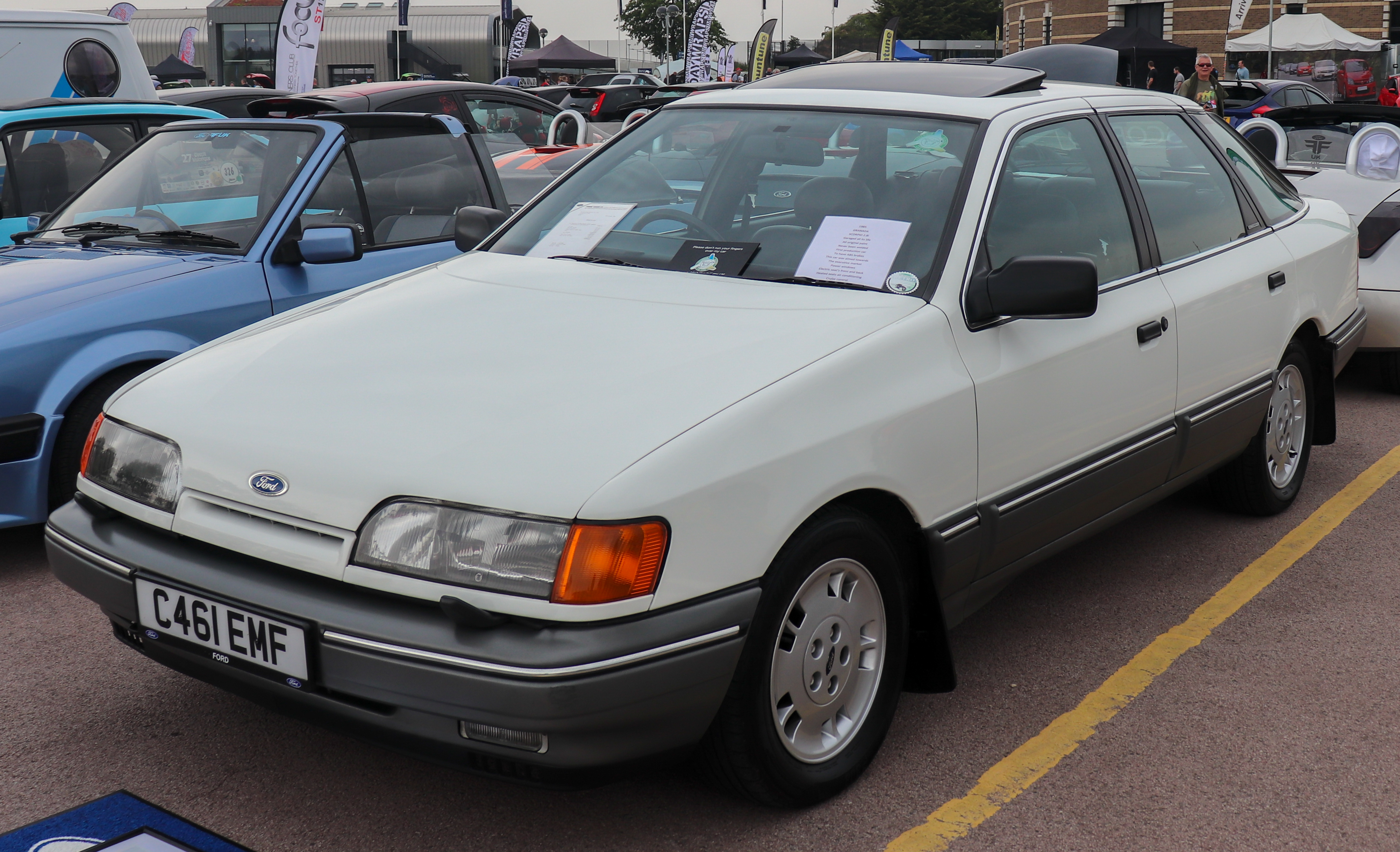

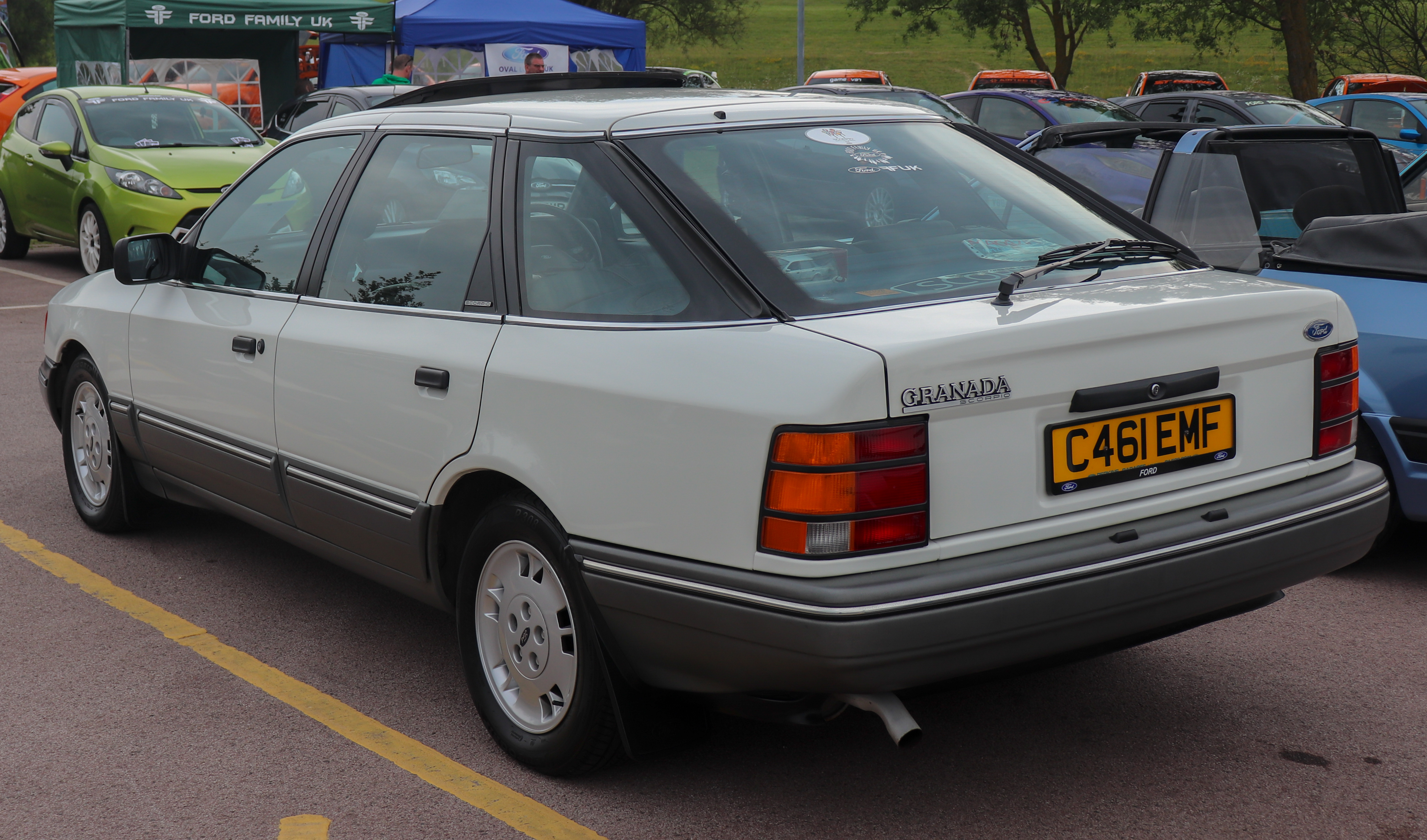
Ford Granada Scorpio Mk I Hatchback (1985–1989)

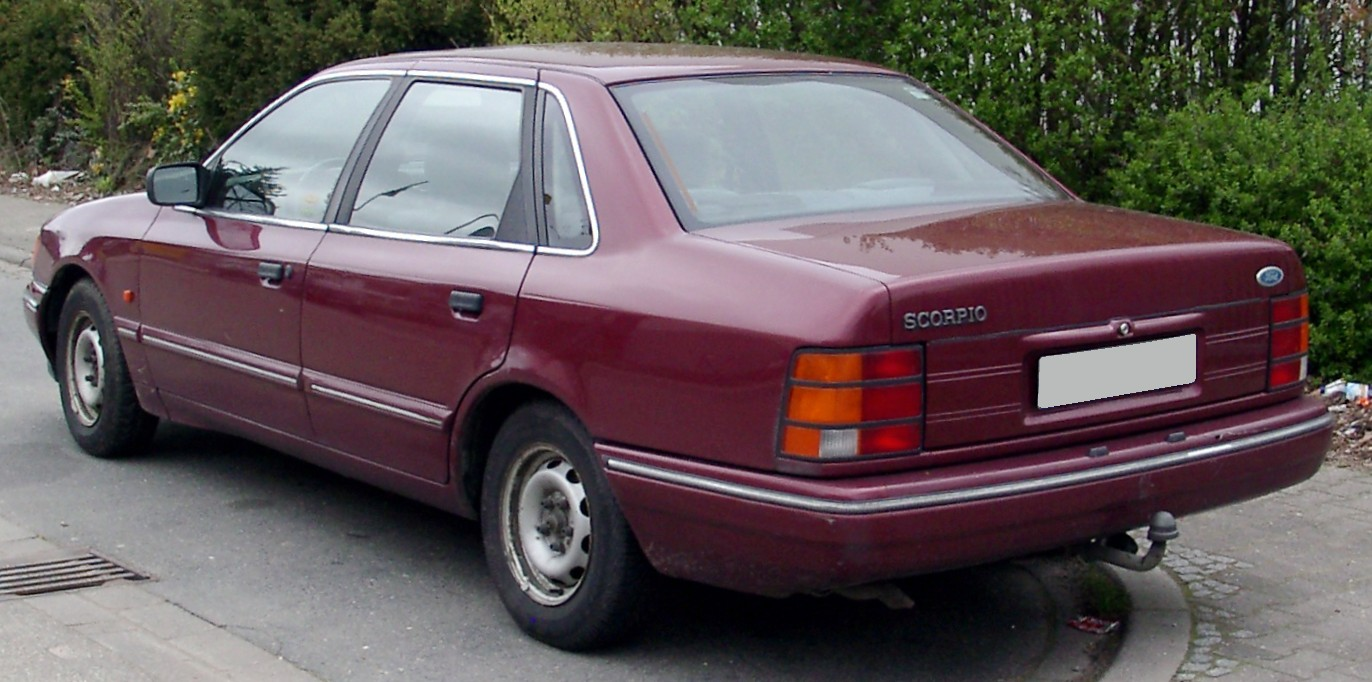
Ford Scorpio Mk I Saloon (1989–1992)

Codenamed DE-1 during its development (since it was intended to straddle the European D and E segments), the Scorpio was heavily based on the Sierra, sitting on a stretched version of its floorpan, and using a similar styling philosophy set by both the Sierra and the third generation Escort.

Under the bonnet were well proven engines, starting with the venerable Pinto engine unit in 1.8 L and 2.0 L capacities, as well as the V6 Cologne engine in 2.4 or 2.8-litre displacements. The larger engine was later replaced by a 2.9-litre derivative, and while the slow selling 2.4 remained in production until 1994 it was effectively replaced by the 2.0 DOHC in most markets. By the summer of 1989, the Pinto engines had begun to be gradually replaced, with the eight-valve version of Ford's DOHC engine replacing the 2.0 L model.

The Scorpio was intended to maintain Ford's position in Europe as the principal alternative to a Mercedes or BMW for those looking to own an executive car. It was also launched more than a year ahead of new competitors from Rover and Opel/Vauxhall.

To this end Ford built on the already extensive specification available on the outgoing MkII Granada (which for the period, was very well equipped, with features such as leather seats, air conditioning, electric sunroof, and trip computer either standard or available as options) by adding some additional features unusual on a mass market car. Improvements available included: heated windscreen, cruise control, electrically adjustable seats front and rear and later all-wheel drive.

Initially the Chubb AVA lock barrel was fitted to models at launch, but by around 1987 these were replaced by the Tibbe lock.

The most notable advance was the fitment of anti-lock braking system, the first time this feature had been made standard across the whole range on a mass-produced car. The car was widely praised as being very comfortable and spacious, particularly in respect of its rear legroom.

Unlike the Granada, it was initially only available as a hatchback, and not as a saloon or estate. This proved to be a mistake for Ford, which later introduced a saloon version in December 1989. An estate version finally appeared in the beginning of 1992, when the whole range underwent a facelift, with new styling which hinted at the new Mondeo, which would replace the Sierra a year later. There were few engineering changes over the years, notably the introduction of the DOHC engines in 1989, and the Scorpio Cosworth with a 2.9 L 24 valve Cosworth V6 in December 1990.

The Cosworth was both large and fast, which consequently gave it poor fuel consumption. Many owners often commented at the fact that 25 miles per gallon was about as much as you could get out of a car with this engine. Prop-shaft deterioration over time was also considered to be a problem on early Mark I and II Cosworths.

In the United Kingdom and Ireland, following the initial market resistance towards the Sierra, something which had been attributed to its radical styling, Ford elected to keep the Granada name in those markets, making the Scorpio effectively a Mk III Granada. The "Scorpio" name was instead used as a trim designation rather than the model name, being positioned higher than Ford's traditional Ghia top of the range model. These models were marketed as "Granada Scorpio", but were badged simply as "Scorpio", with an elongated "Granada" underneath.

=== Merkur Scorpio ===
The Merkur Scorpio was a North American version of the European Scorpio Mk I. The car was offered at select Lincoln–Mercury dealerships from 1988 to 1989.

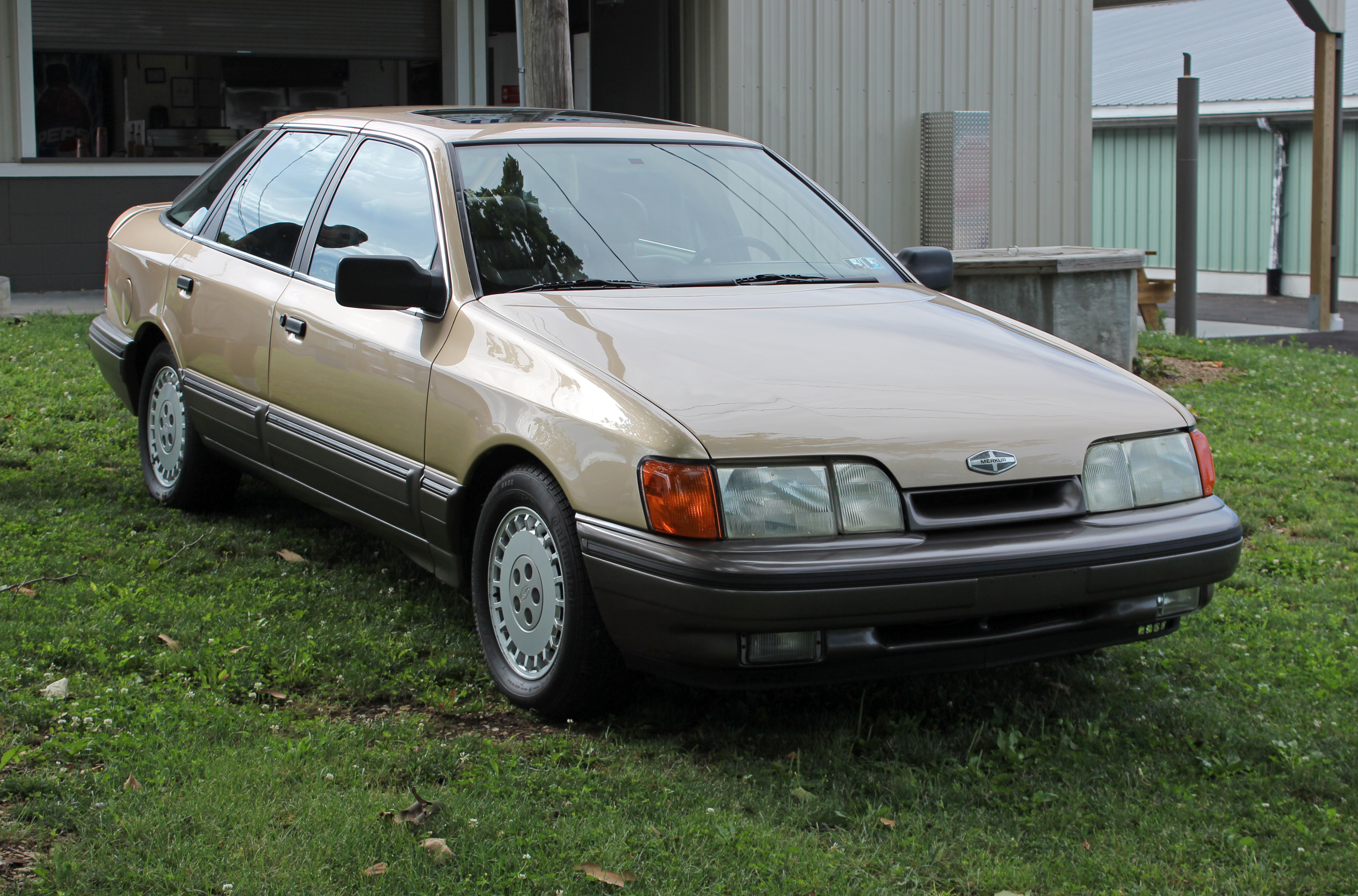
1989 Merkur Scorpio

The Merkur Scorpio was only offered with the Cologne 2.9L V6 engine with some detail differences from the contemporary Fords. Adapted to meet American emissions requirements, the Merkur version of the Scorpio produced 140 hp (104 kW) when introduced to the North American market in 1988.

The vast majority were fitted with the A4LD four speed automatic transmission, and the rest received the T-9 five speed manual transmission. Only automatic versions of the Scorpio were available in Canada. The car was marketed as an upscale, mid-size luxury car, but never achieved the market impact that the Ford Motor Company hoped for. Ford dropped the Merkur nameplate altogether after 1989.

=== Facelifted model ===
The model was a facelifted Mark I with changed grille, headlights, rear lights, bonnet and dashboard. It went on sale in March 1992, at the same time that an estate model (first shown in October 1991 at the London Motorfair) was added to the range.

The outdated Peugeot XD3 diesel engine was also replaced by a more powerful unit from Italian VM Motori. This facelift realigned the look of the Granada with the forthcoming Mondeo, and kept styling cues coherent across the model range.

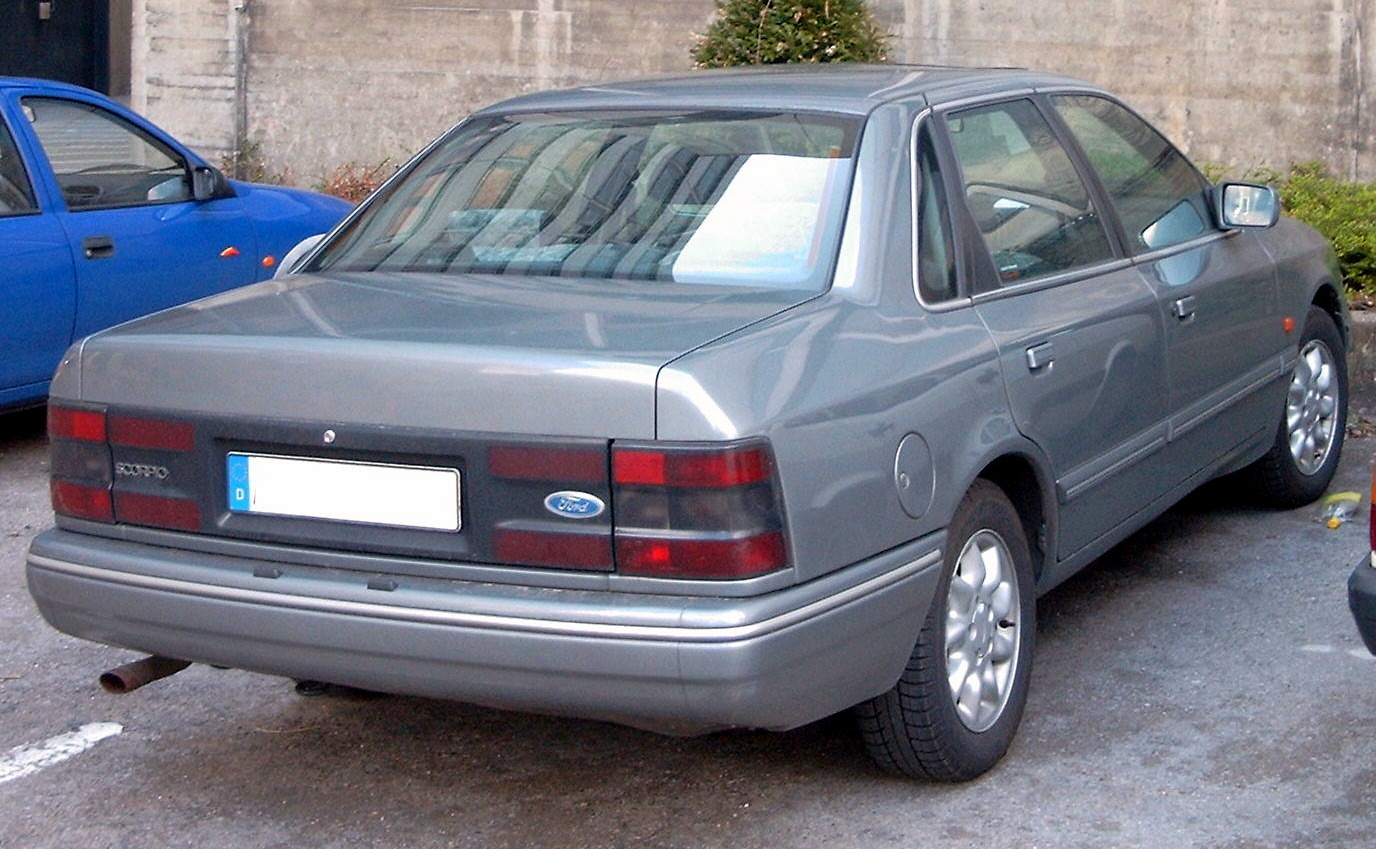
Facelifted Ford Scorpio Mk I saloon

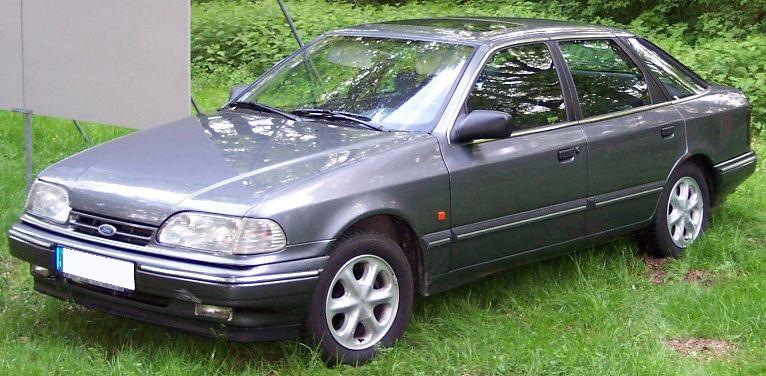
The five-door remained available, though its market share dwindled

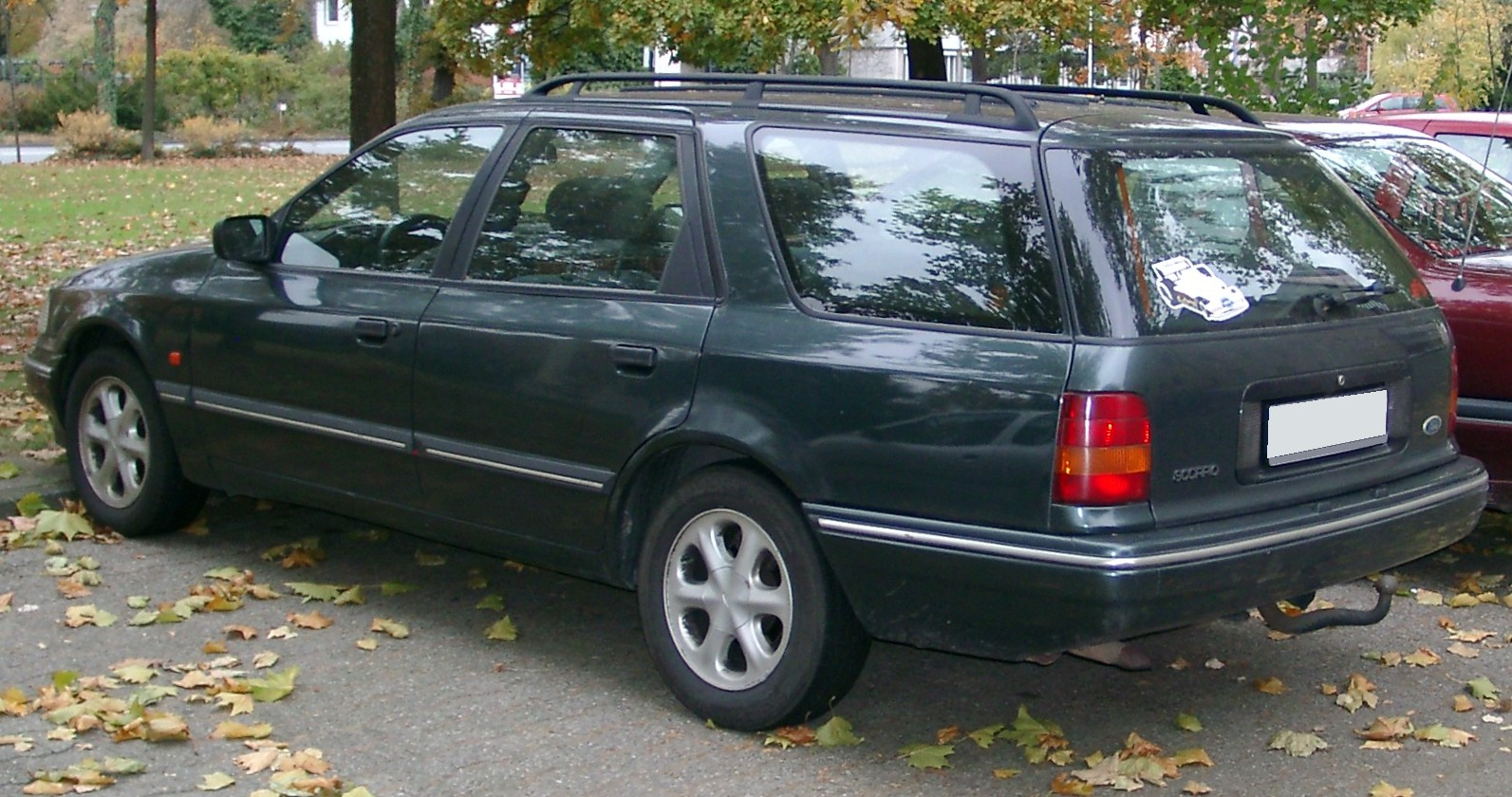
Scorpio station wagon ("Turnier"; rear)

== Second generation (1994–1998) ==
Second generation
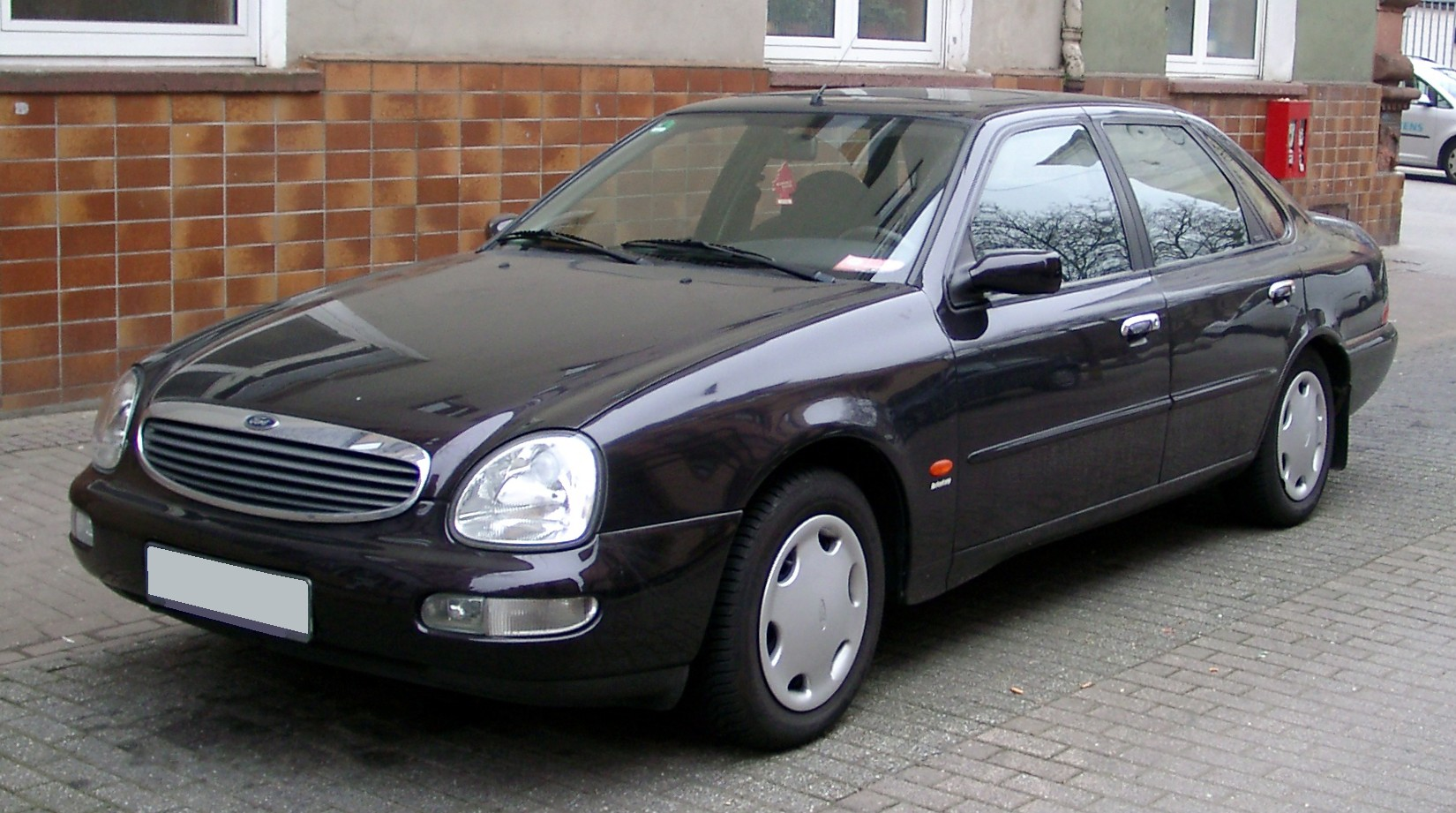
- Ford Scorpio Mk II Saloon

Overview
- Production: 1994–1998

Body and chassis
- Body style: 4-door saloon 5-door estate 3-door hearse
- Layout: Front-engine, rear-wheel-drive

Powertrain
- Engine: Petrol: 2.0 L NSD 8V I4; 2.0 L N3A 16V I4; 2.3 L Y5A/Y5B 16V I4; 2.9 L BRG 12V V6; 2.9 L BOB (Cosworth) 24V V6; Diesel: 2.5 L SCD (VM 425) OHV turbo I4
- Transmission: 5-speed manual 4-speed automatic

Dimensions
- Wheelbase: 2,770 mm (109.1 in)
- Length: 4,825 mm (190.0 in); 4,826 mm (190.0 in) (estate)
- Width: 1,760 mm (69.3 in)
- Height: 1,388 mm (54.6 in); 1,442 mm (56.8 in) (estate)
- Curb weight: 1,577 kg (3,477 lb)

Launched at the Paris Motor Show in October 1994, the second generation Scorpio was made available in saloon or estate styles only, the hatchback bodystyle having been dropped. It had largely the same floorpan as its predecessor as well as all of the same engines that were in use at the end of the first generation's run. Many suspension and handling improvements were made between the first and second generations (including self levelling rear suspension on the estates). It was also radically restyled both inside and outside, with new design of headlights, grille and door handles, which were taken from the Ford Crown Victoria.

Despite its controversial styling, the luxury interior, handling and performance were widely praised by reviewers. Edward Stobart praised the car, and Jeremy Clarkson declared it '[as] equally talented' as the Vauxhall Omega, one of the Scorpio's main rivals, and that it was 'well made... extremely well equipped, and considering its size, it was good value for money'. In general however, this praise however was overshadowed by criticism concerning the styling. In addition, the "Granada" name, which had been retained in the United Kingdom and Ireland for the MkI Scorpio (AKA MkIII Granada) was finally dropped and the "Scorpio" name – already used elsewhere – was adopted.

In April 1998, it was listed as the third worst N-registered car (August 1995 to July 1996) to own in the United Kingdom from a Top Gear survey of 120 cars, receiving a particularly low rating for its reliability. It fared slightly better in the 1999 and 2000 surveys.

In September 1997, the Scorpio was facelifted, with darker headlight surrounds and a more subtle grille, to tone down the front end of the car. The '50s-throwback' 'low-slung wrap-around' rear lights were also revised to make the 'plump' rear-end of the car less bulbous. Despite plans to release a new model in 1998, this was to be the last development for the model, which finished production over the summer of 1998.

Whether or not the car genuinely made Ford's sales expectations, the shifting European car market at the end of the 1990s meant that it was not directly replaced. This was not unusual at the time, with the market trending towards either high-specced large family cars for executives or towards multi-purpose vehicles for families, as mainstream brands gradually surrendered the "E" segment to "premium" brands such as BMW, Mercedes-Benz, and Audi. Reflecting this new reality, Ford's ownership of Jaguar and Volvo meant that it now had direct access to the European executive car market with the newly developed Jaguar S-Type and Volvo S80 without directly replacing the Scorpio.

The Dutch royal family used several Scorpios, some stretched ones, and all painted in Royal Blue. There is still a custom-built Scorpio landaulet in the royal stables. After Ford ended the production, the Volvo S80 replaced the Ford models.

=== Styling and appearance ===
The new Scorpio was the first ever Ford design developed entirely using a CAD/CAM computer system, and inside the car were new armchair style seats and improved interior quality, but outside the new 'Americanised' look was controversial. The car sported bulbous 'globular' headlights and its tail lights were arranged in a thin line just above the bumper (described as a 'gratuitously narrow... ill-chosen necklace... resembling a giant cushion'). Unusually, Ford never released the name of the designer and maintain to this day that the car outsold its expected figures (although they never released what those figures actually were), however it has been noted that the unknown designer was 'very proud' of their work.

...there's no way [Ford] could raise additional funds by flogging posters of the [Scorpio] to teenagers.

— Jeremy Clarkson, Clarkson on: the Ford Scorpio, 1998

The bulging headlights and wide grille were defended as 'bold', 'quirky', 'a design statement', 'dramatic', and provided 'refreshing lines', but the public and press reaction to the design was largely negative. Contemporary reviewers wrote that the car had a 'stupid grin', 'gormless mouth', 'droopy nose', 'daft' 'humped boot', 'dopey eyes', 'revolting' 'stupid headlights', a 'fish-mouth grille opening', 'fat flanks', a 'reptilian gurn', and that it looked 'mixed up', 'boxy yet curvy', 'gargoyle-ugly' and 'bug eyed', it 'resembled something that David Attenborough might reveal from a dank cave in Borneo', and 'driving a milk float would score more cred points in a traffic jam'.

The styling was so controversial that several months before the release of the vehicle to the public, Ford set up a focus group involving large sections of the automotive press at their engineering and design centre in Cologne, comparing the distinctive 'smiling mouth' grille to historic designs such as those from Jaguar, Alfa Romeo, and Austin-Healey. The acknowledgement by Ford of good design from other manufacturers was praised by the press; however, the design of the Scorpio itself received universal condemnation, and the focus group failed to placate the media regarding the car's appearance, who would later go on to viciously attack the styling on release.

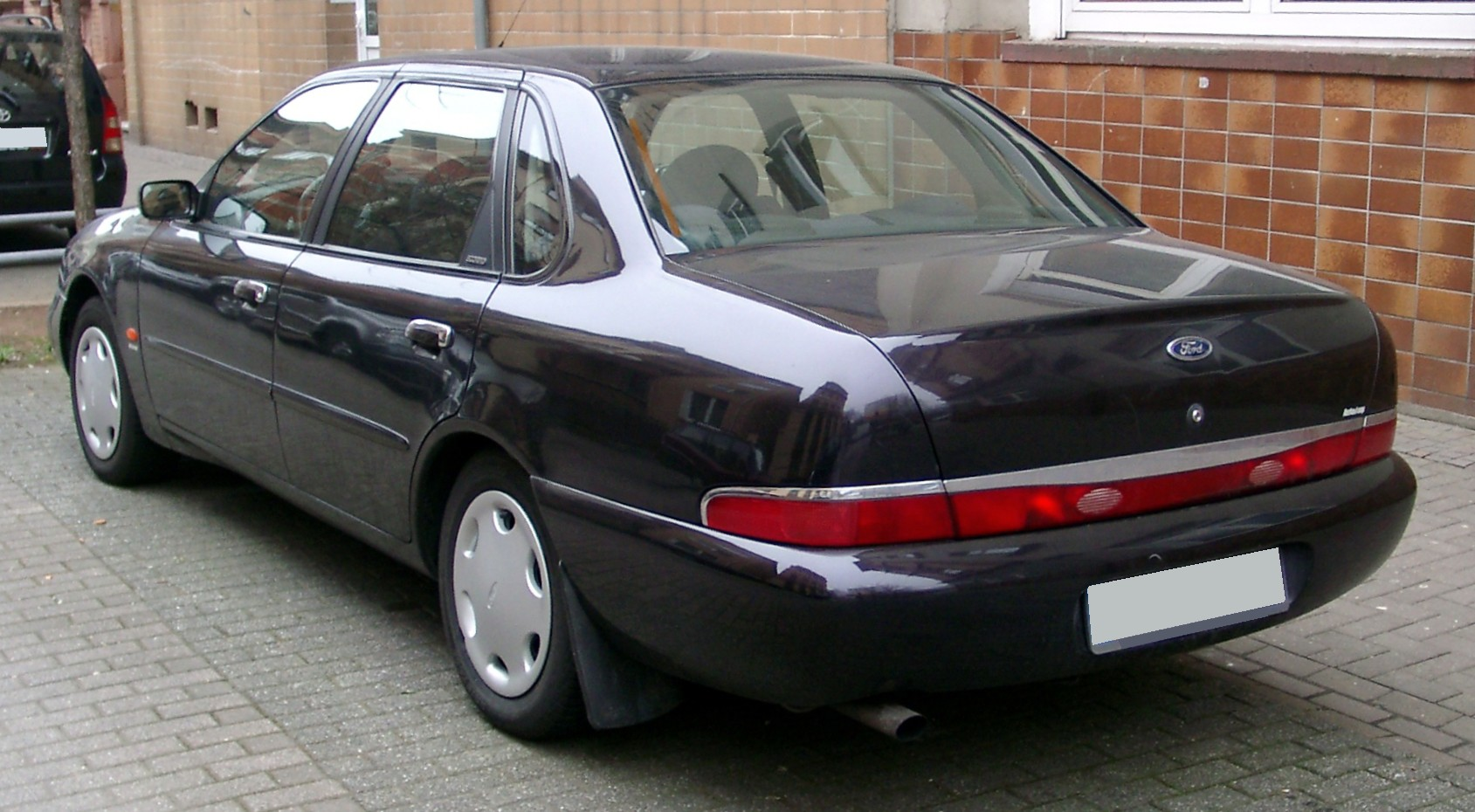
Ford Scorpio Mk II saloon

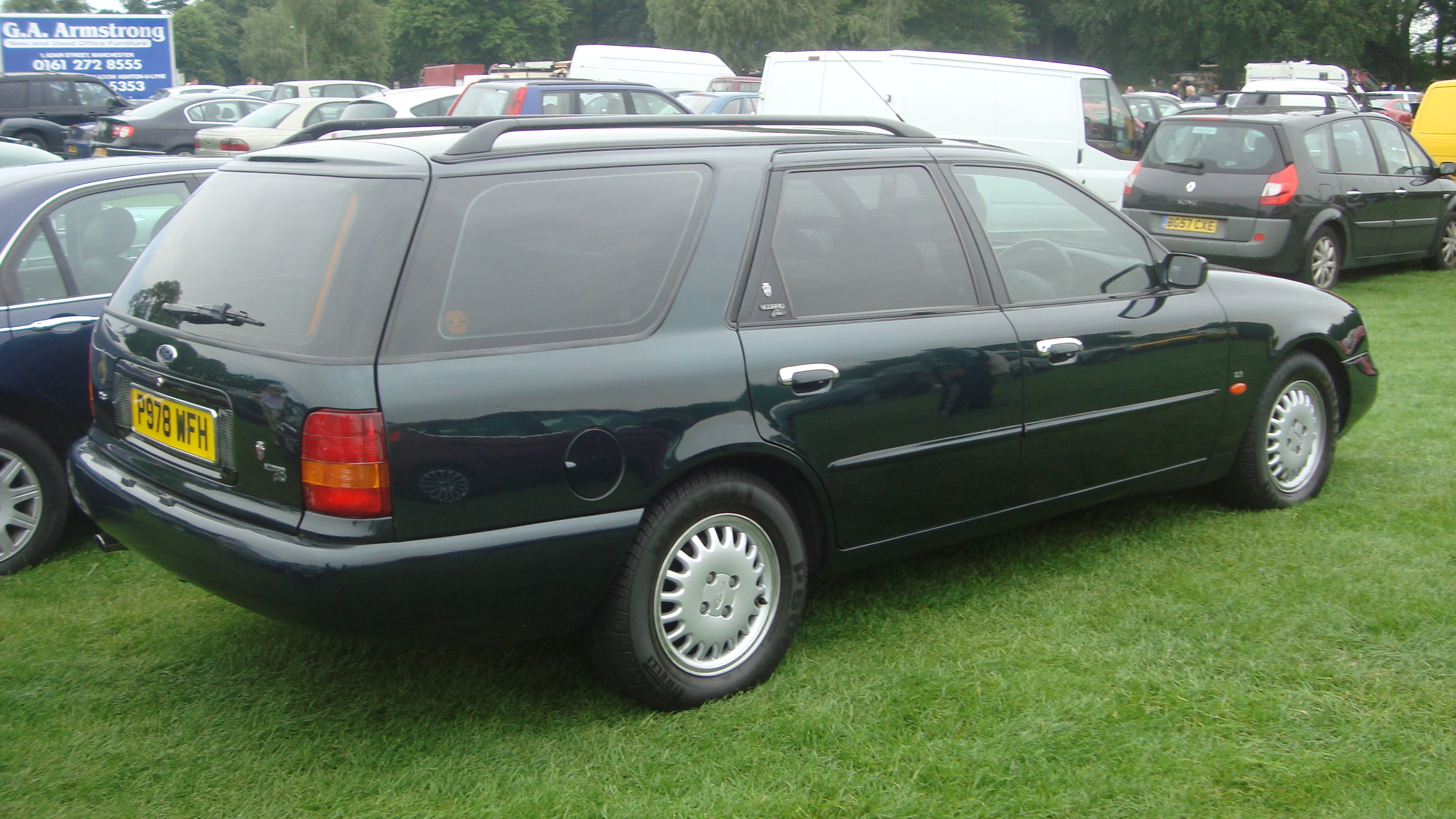
Ford Scorpio MK II estate

On release, the styling was immediately criticised in both the automotive press and the non-automotive mainstream media, with entire pages in the latter attacking the aesthetics. Tony Mason of Top Gear disliked the front, saying that the headlamps looked out of place and the car looked incomplete, Edward Stobart described the car as 'the ugliest car in Britain', particularly disliking the 'featureless' rear, saying that it did not look as good as the BMW 7-Series, while Ken Greenley of the Royal College of Art (designer of the SsangYong Musso and Rodius) disliked the entire design philosophy. Described as 'just plain ugly', 'like one of those fairground cars with a silly face on the front', 'like something out of Walt Disney, someone has gone on acid and tripped to the Seventies for the front', and 'designed by a committee of people in sunglasses sitting in the dark'. Other reviewers were even more scathing, one saying that 'it doesn't have much of a personality... the front of the car is like a face with a huge beaming smile... it looks a bit ridiculous really', another describing the front end as 'look[ing] like someone's just rammed a banana up its bottom', and another remarking 'I wouldn't feel proud of this... it's the ugliest car going'.

After release, the criticism became even more intense, journalists describing it as 'much unloved', 'Britain's most unpopular car', a 'poor relation' to its rivals, 'styled like a guppy', with 'the looks of a smiling frog', and 'the ugliest manmade vehicle of all time'.

Described as a 'gopping hideous monstrosity', Jeremy Clarkson wrote in The Times at the time that this car had "village idiot features" and a "loopy face". He elaborated later on that the Scorpio ended any argument as to which car was the ugliest on the road, that the car "resemble[s] an extra from Finding Nemo", and that it had 'a face of such unparalleled awfulness' and would 'make... children cry'. Richard Hammond and James May described it as 'gopping', while May additionally described it as 'not Ford's finest styling', and in Richard Porter's 2004 book Crap Cars the Scorpio Mark II was listed as number 49 (of 50) on looks alone.

On the DVD special Clarkson: Heaven and Hell, Jeremy Clarkson set up a jousting contest between a Scorpio – which he described as "a wide mouthed frog" – and a Triumph TR7, eventually destroying both cars via head-on collision.

In Germany, the satirical magazine Titanic noted the Scorpio's front's similarity to the facial features of politician Günter Verheugen, who would go on to become EU Commissioner.

=== Trim levels and engines ===
The Scorpio Mark II was available in the following levels of trim (each one being available as a saloon or an estate and with any engine). Regardless of the trim level, any car with a 2.9 Cosworth engine was fitted with traction control, cruise control and an automatic gearbox as standard (a manual gearbox could not be specified at all). All other engines could be fitted with either a manual or automatic transmission although, in practice, the vast majority of Scorpios were automatic.

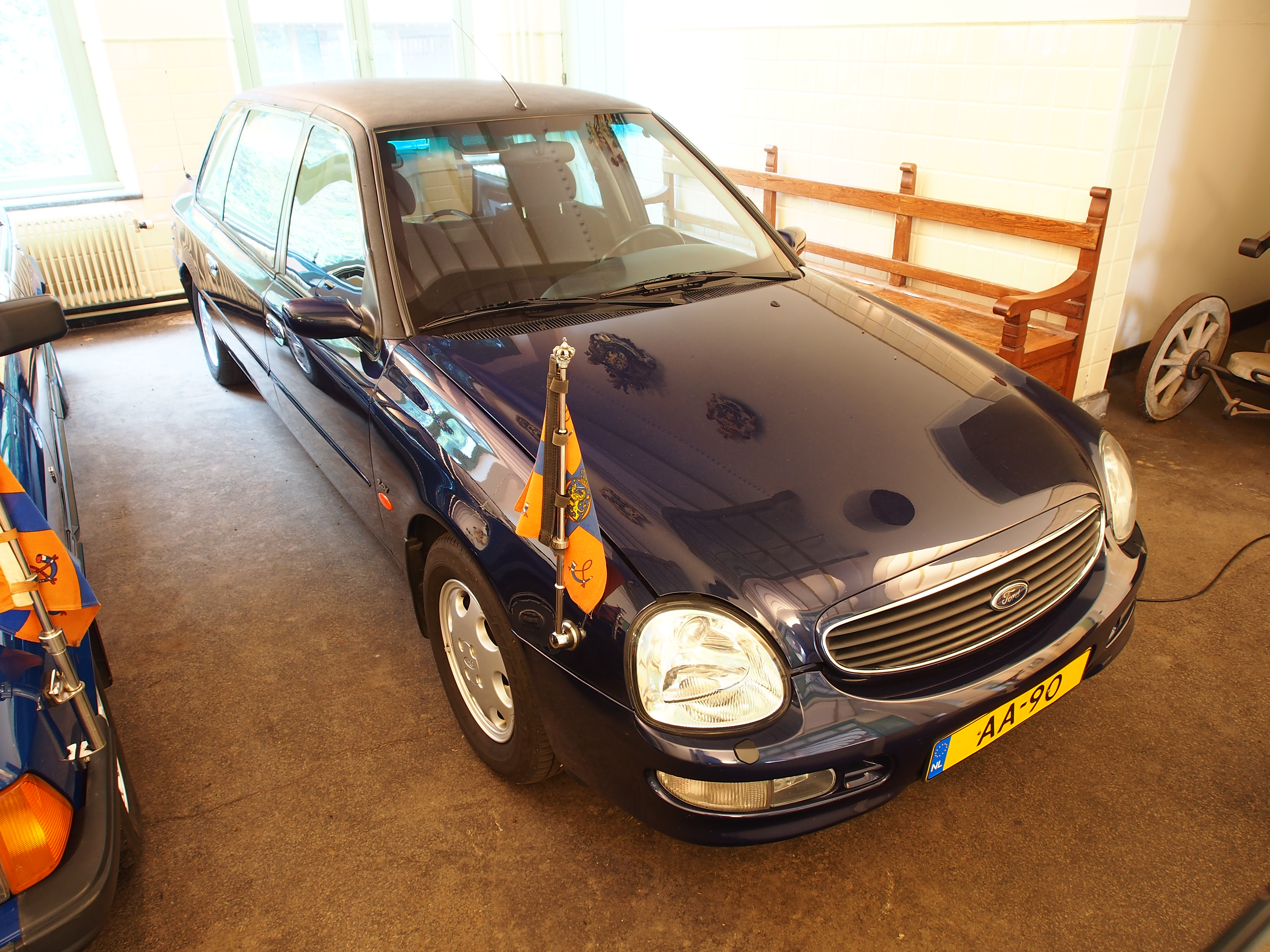
Stretched Ford Scorpio Mk II used by the Dutch royal family

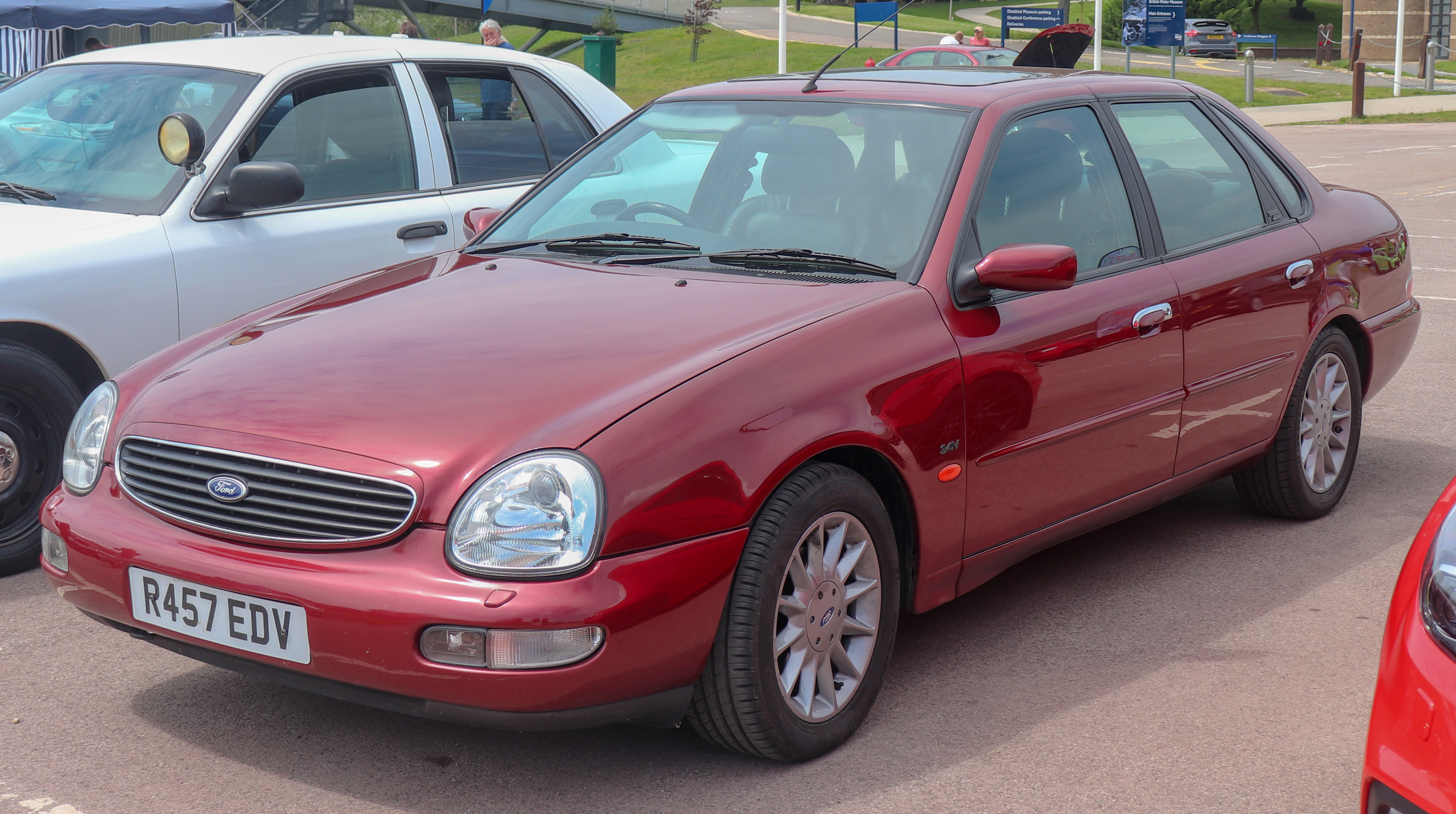
Facelifted Ford Scorpio Mk II Saloon

- Executive: The base model, although even this had a high level of specification including electric windows, ABS, PAS as well as an alarm and immobiliser.
- Ghia: This level added air conditioning, alloy wheels, front fog lights and electric mirrors as well as a variety of minor additions.
- Ultima: The highest level added a CD autochanger, climate control, leather seats, cruise control and an automatically dimming mirror, and electrically operated seats as well as a variety of other minor improvements.

Some Ultima versions were fitted with a VM Motori 2.5 litre turbo diesel engine. The VM halves the fuel bills but suffered from turbo lag and a tendency to all-or-nothing acceleration.

Unusually trim levels and engine sizes were not liveried on the backs of the cars. Rather the trim levels were liveried on the sides of the cars by the Scorpio badges on the rear window frames as such. The Executive had no badge, simply the word "Scorpio". Each other model had the model name under the badge, for example "Scorpio Ultima."

Engine sizes were also on the sides of the cars towards the front just above the auxiliary indicator lights as such:

- 2.0 L: no badge (on older cars the two litre 8 valve had no badge, but the two litre sixteen valve bore had the badge "2.0 16v")
- 2.3 L: "2.3" (on older cars "2.3 16v")
- 2.9 L: "2.9" (on older cars "2.9 12v")
- 2.9 L: Cosworth "24v"

Unlike the Mark I Scorpio, the word "Cosworth" did not appear anywhere on the outside of cars fitted with such an engine (possibly in an attempt to reduce the likelihood of vehicle theft) although it is in evidence across the top of the engine. However, on the 1998 facelift, the Cosworth badge is clearly visible on the trunk lid. The output of the Cosworth V6 had also been increased from 195 hp (145 kW) to 207 hp (154 kW) for the second generation.
