= Merkur Scorpio =

Car model

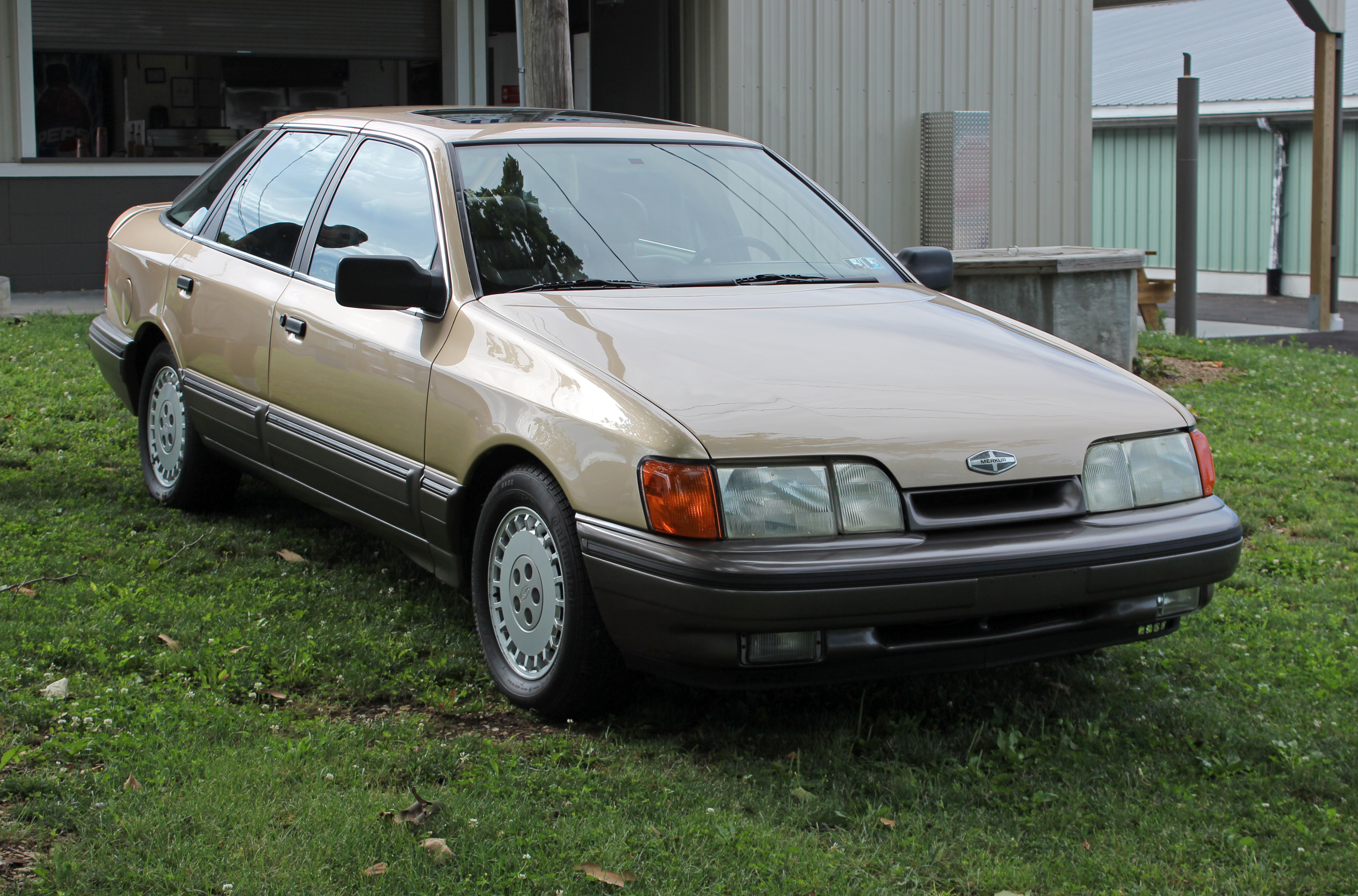

Overview
- Manufacturer: Ford of Germany (Ford of Europe)
- Production: 1987–1989
- Model years: 1988–1989
- Assembly: West Germany: Cologne (Cologne Body & Assembly)

Body and chassis
- Class: Mid-size luxury / Executive car
- Body style: 5-door hatchback
- Layout: F/R
- Platform: Ford DE-1 platform
- Related: Ford Scorpio/Ford Granada; Ford Sierra; Merkur XR4Ti

Powertrain
- Engine: 2.9 L Cologne V6
- Transmission: 5-speed Type 9 manual 4-speed A4LD automatic

Dimensions
- Wheelbase: 108.7 in (2,761 mm)
- Length: 186.4 in (4,735 mm)
- Width: 69.5 in (1,765 mm)
- Height: 54.6 in (1,387 mm)

The Merkur Scorpio is a mid-size luxury car produced by Ford of Europe and sold in North America as the flagship of the Ford Motor Company's new Merkur brand, established in 1985 when the Merkur XR4Ti went on sale. The Scorpio was only offered for the 1988 and 1989 model years.

== History ==
=== Origins ===
The Merkur Scorpio is based on the European Ford Scorpio Mk I (called the Ford Granada Mk III in the United Kingdom and Ireland), which was European Car of the Year in 1986.

The Scorpio was manufactured in Cologne, West Germany, at Ford of Germany's Cologne Body & Assembly plant.

Sales of both the Merkur Scorpio and the Merkur XR4Ti captive imports were handled by approximately 800 selected Lincoln-Mercury dealers in the United States and Canada.

The Merkur Scorpio was developed to give Lincoln-Mercury a competitor against European executive cars sold in North America, such as the Audi 100, BMW 5-series, Mercedes-Benz 190E, and Volvo 740/760.

Both European and North American Scorpios were initially offered only as five-door fastback/hatchbacks. Some have suggested that the Scorpio's styling was a poor choice for this relatively conservative market.

=== Pricing ===
The Merkur Scorpio was introduced with a base price of $23,390 (equivalent to $66,300 in 2025). Options included automatic transmission, power moonroof, and Touring Package. Most North American Scorpios were sold with both an automatic transmission and the Touring Package, which raised the sticker price to $26,405 (equivalent to $74,800 in 2025), and brought the Scorpio close to the much larger Lincoln Town Car in price.

To attract buyers, Lincoln-Mercury offered a Guaranteed Resale Value Program. This pegged the car's trade-in value, as a percentage of its purchase price, to that of the Mercedes-Benz 190E when traded in for another Lincoln-Mercury vehicle two to four years after purchase.

=== Discontinuation ===
On October 20, 1989, Ford announced it was ending imports of the Scorpio to the United States. Sales of the XR4Ti had ended earlier that year, so this decision effectively retired the Merkur brand. Lasting only two model years longer than the Edsel, it is among the shortest-lived American car brands in postwar history.

Coinciding with sales that fell short of Ford's projected 15,000 units per year for the brand, Merkur fell victim to unstable exchange rates between the US dollar and the Deutsche Mark, leading to increases in price. New US passive safety regulations coming into effect in 1990 meant that the Scorpio would need to have automatic seatbelts or airbags. Ford determined that the passive safety compliance cost was too high to justify for a slow-selling model line in North American.

In total, 22,010 examples were sold.

After the Merkur Scorpio was cancelled, Ford of Europe expanded the Granada/Scorpio range by introducing a 3-box sedan model at the beginning of 1990, and a station wagon two years later. The European Scorpio MkI was produced until 1994.

=== Sales ===
Calendar Year	American Sales
1987	5,178
1988	9,516
1989/1990	7,316

== Features ==
=== Chassis and running gear ===
The Merkur Scorpio is based on Ford's rear-wheel drive Ford DE-1 platform, which shares many features with the chassis of the Ford Sierra, but with a wheelbase extended by approximately 6 in (152 mm).

The Scorpio's DE-1 platform has four-wheel independent suspension. The Merkur Scorpio was one of the first vehicles sold in North America with standard anti-lock brakes (ABS) and four-wheel disc brakes. Within the Ford Motor Company, the latter two features were previously exclusive to the Lincoln Mark VII.

=== Powertrain ===
The only engine offered in the Merkur Scorpio was Ford's 2.9 L Cologne V6, the largest engine option for the European Scorpio. This overhead valve (OHV) V6 family had debuted in 1962, but this version benefited from a slight increase in displacement over its predecessor, as well as a redesigned cylinder block that is 30% stiffer, new pistons and narrow piston rings that reduce friction losses, and new cylinder heads with a separate exhaust port per cylinder instead of the previous version's conjoined ports. Each cylinder bank also had its own separate throttle body, intake plenum, and pipework. Power output is 144 hp (107 kW).

The V6 was paired with a standard-equipment 5-speed Ford Type 9 manual transmission, while a 4-speed Ford A4LD overdrive automatic transmission was optional.

=== Body ===
Several changes were made to the Merkur Scorpio that distinguish it from its Ford counterpart. The B- and C-pillars are blacked-out, giving the car a "floating-roof" effect like that on the Mercury Sable sedan. The rear fascia, with a full-width taillamp lens similar to the Sable's, is unique to the Merkur. With the exception of divisional badging, the front fascia with its minimal front grille opening was largely unchanged, and Merkurs are fitted with foglamps and headlamps that comply with American lighting regulations. Along with standard two-tone lower body trim, the Merkur Scorpio received its own model-specific alloy wheels.

The Merkur Scorpio is a five-passenger car, and shares much of its interior with the top-of-line Ford Scorpio, including power-reclining rear seats and a tilt-telescoping steering column.

== Gallery ==
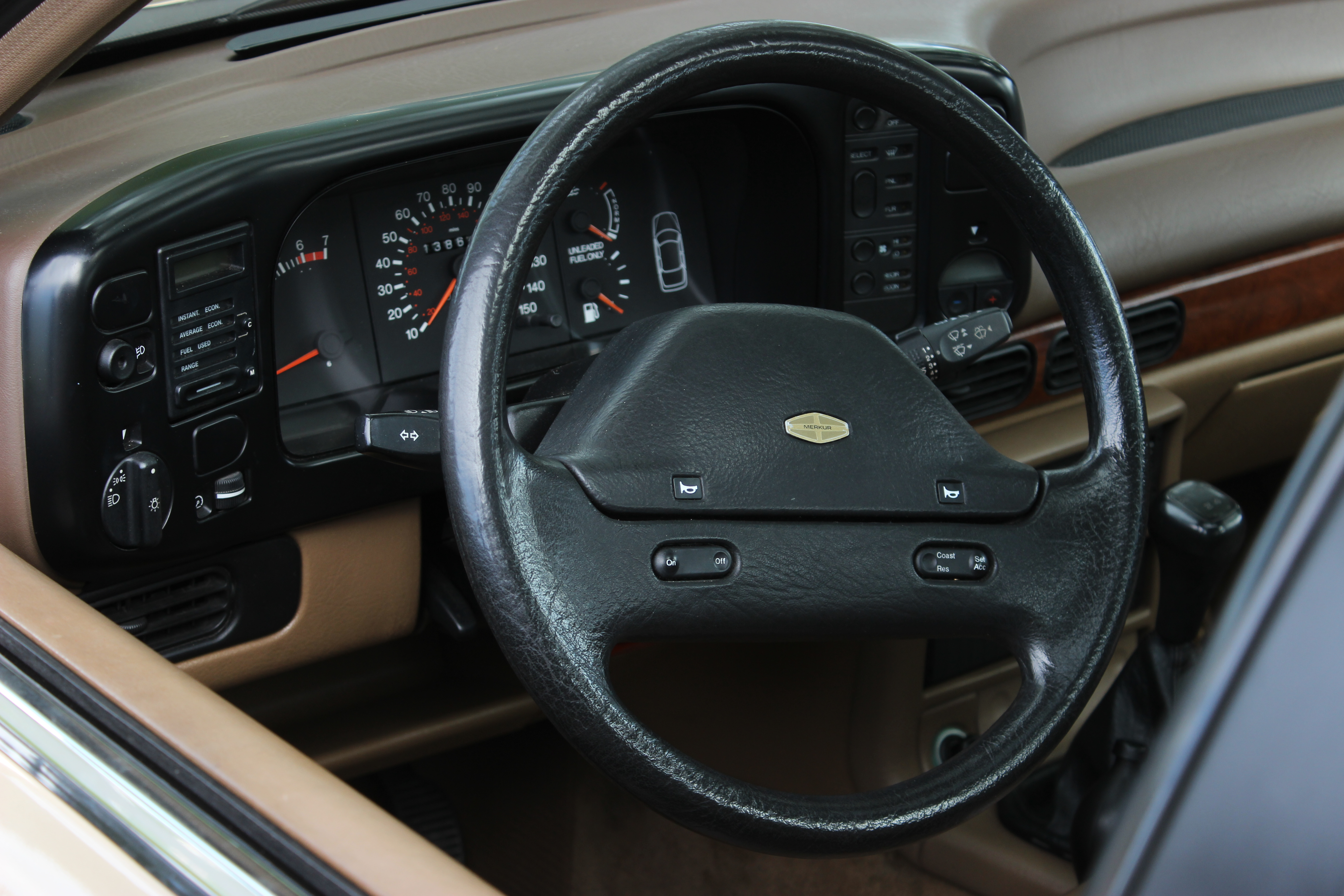
Merkur Scorpio dashboard

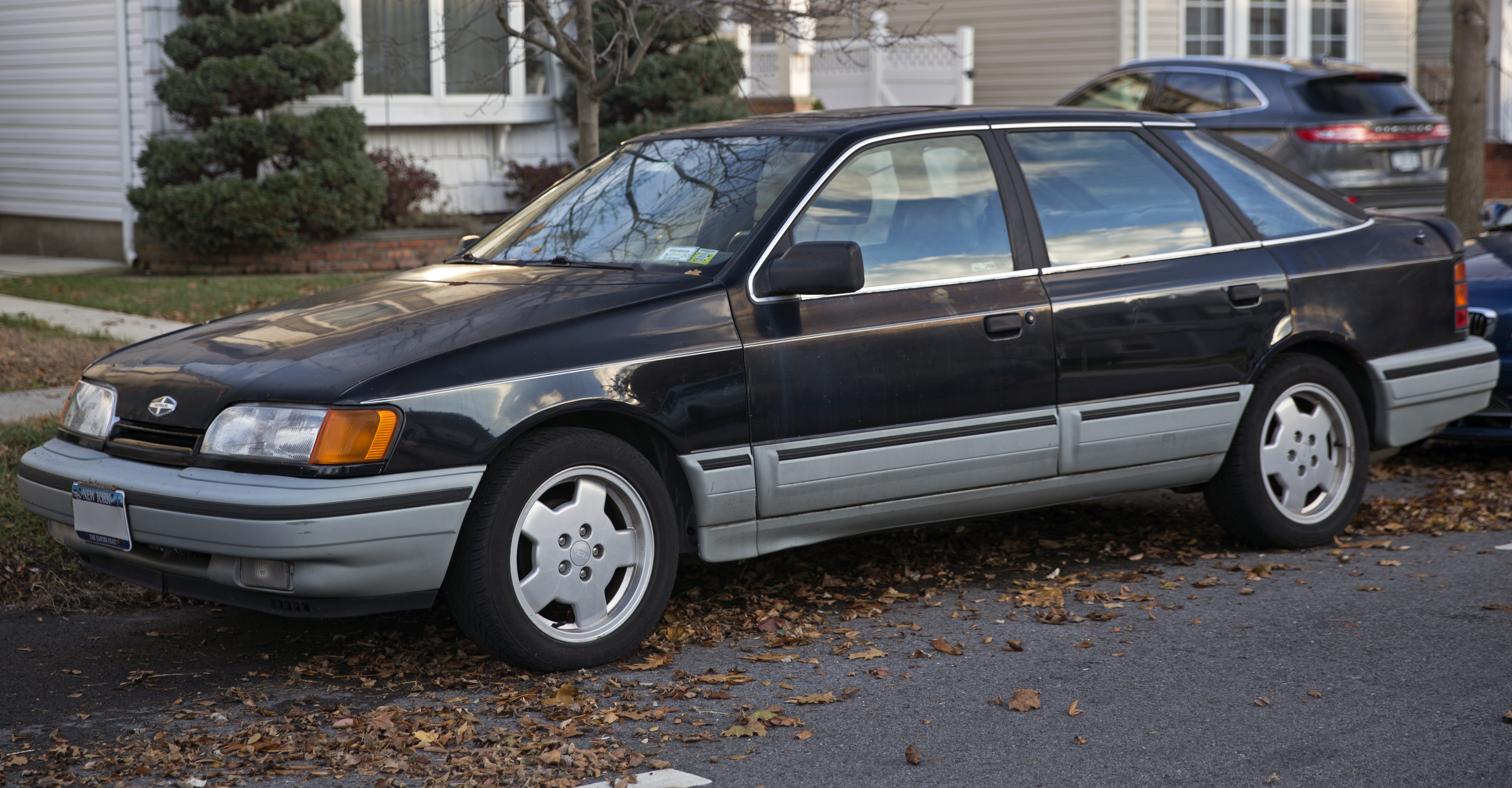
1989 Merkur Scorpio (Ford Scorpio wheels)

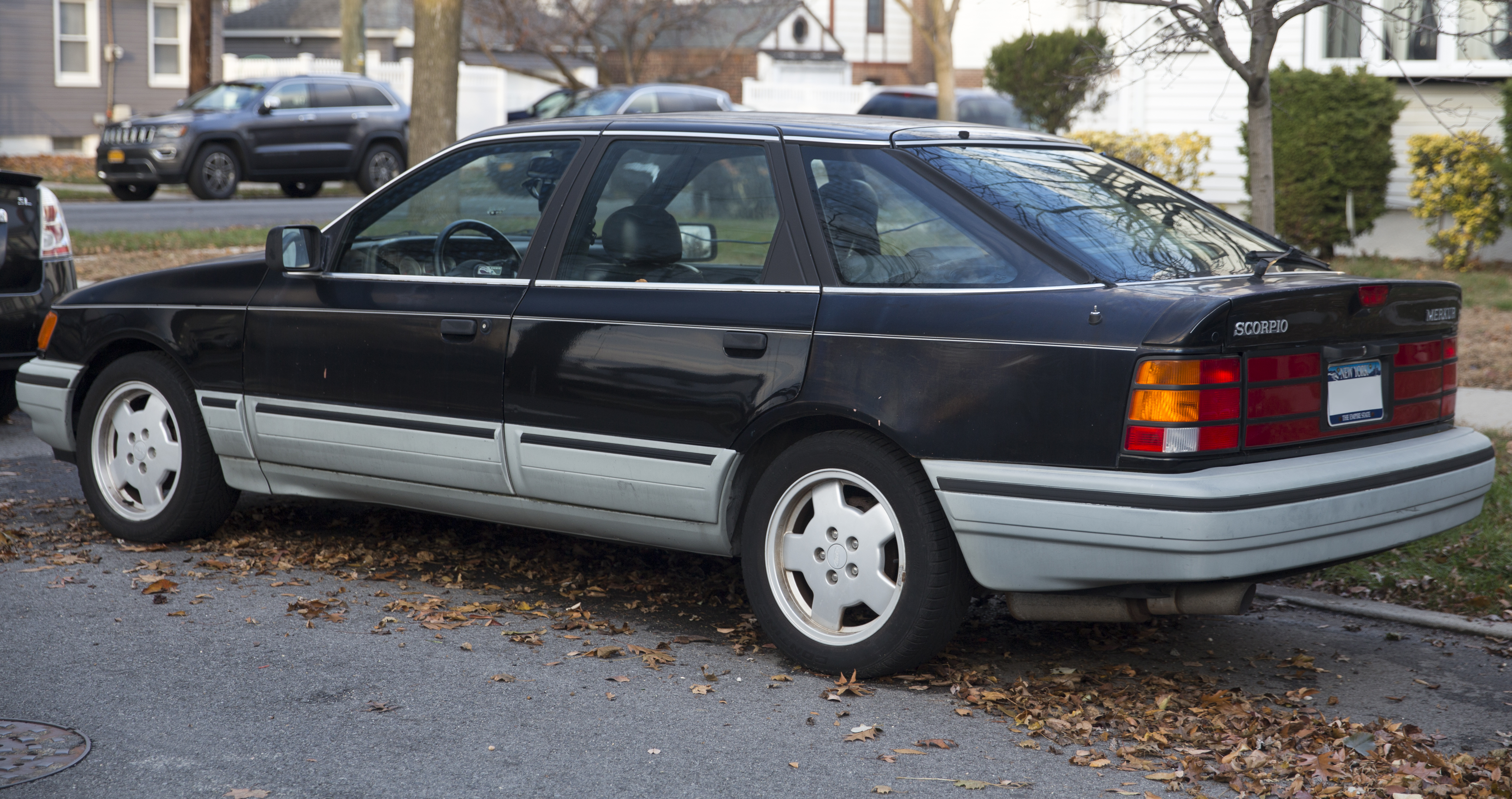
1989 Merkur Scorpio, rear (Ford Scorpio wheels)

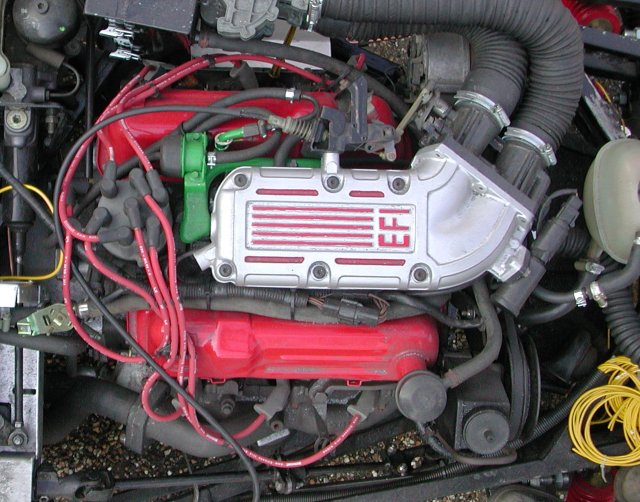
Fuel-injected Ford 2.9-litre V6 with dual intake system

== Technical data ==
Merkur Scorpio technical summary
Feature	Detail
Engine:	Ford Cologne V6
Displacement:	2.9 L (2,935 cc; 179.1 cu in)
Bore × Stroke:	93 mm × 72 mm (3.66 in × 2.83 in)
Maximum power:	144 bhp (107 kW) at 5500 rpm
Maximum torque:	162 ft⋅lb (220 N⋅m) at 3000 rpm
Compression ratio:	9.0:1
Valvetrain:	Single cam-in-block, pushrods, rocker arms, 2 overhead valves per cylinder
Induction:	Multi-port fuel injection
Management:	Ford EEC-IV
Cooling:	Water-cooled
Transmission:	5-speed Ford Type 9 manual 4-speed Ford A4LD automatic
Steering:	Power assisted rack and pinion, 2.7 turns lock-to-lock
Brakes f/r:	10.2 in × 1.0 in (259 mm × 25 mm) vented discs / 10.4 in × 0.4 in (264 mm × 10 mm) solid discs
Suspension front:	Coil-over-strut, lower lateral link. Anti-roll bar as compliance link.
Suspension rear:	Semi-trailing arms, coil springs and shock absorbers (non-concentric), anti-roll bar
Body/Chassis:	Steel unibody chassis
Track f/r:	58.1 / 58.1 in (1,476 / 1,476 mm)
Wheelbase:	108.7 in (2,761 mm)
Tires and wheels:	Pirelli P6 205/60HR-15 tires on 6.0×15 inch cast aluminum wheels
Length; Width; Height:	186.4 in (4,735 mm); 69.5 in (1,765 mm); 54.6 in (1,387 mm)
Weight:	3,240 lb (1,470 kg)
Acceleration (0–60 mph):	9.6 seconds
Maximum speed:	117 mph (188 km/h)
