= Ford MT75 transmission =

Manual vehicle transmission

The MT75 is a rear-wheel drive or four-wheel drive manual transmission, made by the Ford Motor Company. The MT75 replaced the Ford Type 9 transmission.

The MT75 has an all-alloy casing and comes with an integrated bellhousing. In 4x4 versions, the planetary gear center differential with viscous-type limited slip is integrated in to the rear half of the gearbox. The 4x4 system is of full-time type with a static torque split of 34% front, 66% rear (similarly to Type 9 4x4 models).

The MT75 has five speeds and reverse. This was the first Ford production gearbox to have a synchromesh on reverse (so reverse can be selected whilst in slight forward motion).

The internal gear assembly in order from front to back as installed on the mainshaft is as follows: 4th, 3rd, 2nd, 1st, Reverse with 5th gear situated at the rear towards the output (propshaft flange), all gears are of a helical cut. Refined over time with slight improvement made to the synchros, phasing out single part synchromeshes on 1st & 2nd gear in favour of three part syncros.

The designation breaks down as "M" for manual, "T" for transmission, and "75" for the distance in millimetres between the main and layshaft centers.

Common failures include:

- Mainshafts wear through the hardening (1st to 3rd roller) on the journals resulting in noise
- Front and or rear bearing failure
- Brass Selector forks wear out (jumps out of gear) although this can also be caused by worn dogs & windows on hubs (less common)
- Nose cone / Guide tube becomes loose, loss of oil & burnt out gearbox
- Laygear bearings wear out
- Spigot wear / first motion 4th gear separation / loss of drive

Used in the Sierra, Granada, and Scorpio II, it came in various flavours for each engine and was used in two wheel drive and four wheel drive (MT75 4x4) versions (four wheel drive in the 4x4 Sapphire Cosworth, Escort Cosworth and XR4x4). This transmission, like the Type 9, is already used in uprated classic cars and hot rods, especially if a Ford Pinto engine, a multi valve 4-cylinder or Rover V8 engine is used.
