= Ford C3 transmission =

Automatic transmissions by Ford

The Ford C3 transmission and its descendants are a family of light-duty longitudinal automatic transmissions built by the Ford Motor Company.

The Bordeaux Automatic Transmission Plant, in Blanquefort, France (in the Bordeaux metropolitan area) produces automatic transmissions for a variety of rear-wheel drive vehicles. The facility opened in 1973 and was shortly followed by an expansion, the Bordeaux Transaxle Plant, in 1976 to focus on automatic transmissions for front-wheel drive Fords. Bordeaux Automatic Transmission's first product was the C3 3-speed automatic transmission for the Ford Pinto. The C3 design was succeeded by the A4LD 4-speed automatic during the mid-1980s and was in turn succeeded by the 4R44 and 4R55 4-speed automatics during the mid-1990s. The Bordeaux Automatic Transmission Plant's current products are the 5R44 and 5R55 5-speed automatic transmissions.

In February 2009, Ford confirmed its intent to sell the Bordeaux Automatic Transmission Plant for an undisclosed sum to a French company, HZ Holding France SAS, which owns a steel forging operation near Metz. Though the sale will be completed as early as April 2009, the plant will continue to provide transmissions for Ford until 2011 and employment levels at the plant are expected to remain unchanged. Up to and after the production of automatic transmissions for Ford at the Bordeaux plant, HZ Holding expects to invest as much as 200 million Euros in the plant for new industrial projects, including producing components for wind turbines.

== C3 ==
The C3 was introduced as a lightweight 3-speed automatic for compact cars like the Ford Pinto. It was used with four cylinder and small V6 engines. The final appearance of this transmission was in the 1989 Merkur XR4Ti.

=== Applications (US) ===
- 1974–1980 Ford Pinto
- 1974–1977 Mercury Capri
- 1978–1983 Ford Fairmont
- 1970–1986 Ford Mustang
- 1981–1982 Ford Granada
- 1974–1980 Mercury Bobcat
- 1978–1983 Mercury Zephyr
- 1979–1986 Mercury Capri
- 1983–1986 Mercury Marquis/Ford LTD (when equipped with the 2.3 I4)
- 1985–1989 Merkur XR4Ti
- 1983-1989 Ford Thunderbird
- 1979-1982 Ford Durango

=== Applications (EU) ===
- 1972–1985 Ford Granada
- 1972–1975 Ford Consul
- 1982–1987 Ford Sierra
- 1979–1987 Ford Capri
- 1974–1982 Ford Cortina
- 1976–1982 Ford Taunus
- 1970–1980 Ford Escort Mk1 and Mk2

== A4LD ==
The C3 was modified into the A4LD four-speed by adding an overdrive gear, which the C3 lacked. This transmission was introduced in Europe on the 1985 Ford Scorpio and in North America with the 1985 Bronco II and Ranger, again with four- and six-cylinder engines only. It was replaced by the 4R44E and 4R55E in 1995.

This was the first Ford automatic to use an EEC-controlled torque converter lock-up clutch. Electronic shift control for the 3–4 shift was later added, another first, though other gears remained hydraulic.

The A4LD transmission was standard equipment in the Ford Aerostar, where it improved highway fuel economy and provided smoother shifting compared to earlier 3-speed automatics. The transmission's overdrive capability was marketed as a key feature for the Aerostar's towing capacity of up to 5,000 lb (2,300 kg) when properly equipped.

Applications:

=== North America ===
- 1985–1990 Ford Bronco II
- 1987–1993 Ford Mustang (when equipped with the 2.3 I4)
- 1987–1988 Ford Thunderbird (when equipped with the 2.3 I4)
- 1985–1994 Ford Ranger
- 1986–1994 Ford Aerostar
- 1991–1994 Ford Explorer
- 1994–2002 North American Mazda B-Series
- 1991–1994 Mazda Navajo

=== Europe ===
- 1985–1994 Ford Scorpio/Granada III (incl. Merkur Scorpio)
- 1987–1992 Ford Sierra II
- 1986–2003 Ford Transit

== 4R44E and 4R55E ==
The name 4R44E means 4 forward gears, rear-drive platform (or 4WD, with a different tailshaft housing), rated for 440 ft-lb torque (after torque converter multiplication) and electronic shifting. 4R55E is the same but heavier duty and rated for 550 ft·lbs.

For the 1995 model year, the A4LD was upgraded to feature full electronic controls, resulting in a new transmission family. The two major versions of this new transmission were the 4R44E and 4R55E. In Europe, the 4R44E was known simply as the A4LDE (with the E referring to the electronic enhancements to the basic A4LD design) and was briefly used in the Ford Scorpio. The transmissions are fundamentally similar in design, varying only in the durability of key components based on the type of duty they were to be used for. The 4R44E was used in lighter-duty applications, namely with 4-cylinder or 3.0 L V6 models of the Ford Ranger pickup, while the 4R55E was used in heavier-duty applications, specifically with the 4.0 L Cologne V6 used in vehicles like the said Ford Ranger or Ford Explorer. The 4R55E was short-lived however as it was replaced in all instances where it was used with the newer 5R55E during the 1997 model year. The 4R44E continued on through the end of the 1990s before being replaced by the 5R55E's relative, the 5R44E.

Applications:

- 1995–2001 Ford Ranger
- 1995–1997 Ford Aerostar
- 1995–1998 Ford Scorpio
- 1995–1996 Ford Explorer
- 1995–2001 North American Mazda B-Series

== 5R44E/5R55E/N/S/W ==
The 5R55E, though mechanically similar to the 4-speed 4R55E, was a new breed of electronically controlled automatic transmission with an additional forward gear. It was the first 5-speed automatic transmission to be employed by an American automaker. The 5R55E featured more precise computer controls (necessary to accommodate the additional forward gear) and introduced with a sophisticated friction-to-friction shift ability. Like the 4R44E relative to the 4R55E, a version of the 5R55E was made for lighter duty applications: the 5R44E. An example of these transmissions used in a single vehicle line would be in versions of the Ford Ranger pickup where the lighter-duty 5R44E is mated to a 3.0L Vulcan OHV V6 while the heavier duty 5R55E is mated to the more powerful 4.0 L Cologne SOHC V6.

Following the original "E" series of the transmission introduced in the 1998 model year, other variants of the 5R55 transmission appeared. All variants are fundamentally similar to each other in design but differ in things such as specialized controls, gear ratios, or other elements based on the needs of the specific application the transmission is intended for. The first of these variants, the 5R55N, appeared in the Jaguar S-Type and Lincoln LS luxury sedans, and later in the 2002 Ford Thunderbird. The 2003 Thunderbird switched to the 5R55S and featured the option of Ford's SelectShift, which allowed drivers to mimic shifting like a manual transmission without a clutch. The 5R55S, minus the SelectShift feature, was used in models of the Ford Mustang from 2005 until 2010. The 5R55W began use in November 2000 for the 3rd generation Ford Explorer and 2001 Ford Ranger. Mostly specific difference between 5R55W (wide shift) and 5R55S (synchronic shift) is a different overdrive planet gear ratio. Entry-level models of the 2008 Ford FG Falcon were the newest recipients of the 5R55 transmission.

Applications:

- 1997 Ford Aerostar (with 4.0 V6 engine)
- 1997-2011 Ford Ranger
- 1997–2010 North American Mazda B-Series
- 1997–2010 Ford Explorer
- 1998–2010 Mercury Mountaineer
- 2000–2003 Jaguar S-Type
- 2000–2006 Lincoln LS
- 2002–2005 Ford Thunderbird
- 2005–2010 Ford Mustang
- 2008-2010 Ford Falcon
- 2003–2005 Lincoln Aviator

== See also ==
- List of Ford transmissions
- List of Ford bellhousing patterns
