= Merkur =

Defunct automobile brand of the Ford Motor Company

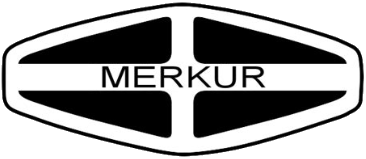
- Product type: Automobile
- Current owner: Ford Motor Company
- Produced by: Ford Motor Company
- Country: U.S.
- Introduced: November 1983
- Discontinued: September 16, 1989; 37 years ago
- Related brands: Lincoln; Mercury
- Markets: North America

Merkur (German pronunciation: [mɛʁˈkuːɐ̯], Mercury) was a North American brand of automobiles marketed by the Lincoln-Mercury division of Ford Motor Company for model years 1985–1989. Drawing its name from the German word for Mercury, Merkur, the brand targeted buyers of European executive cars, marketing two captive import models manufactured by Ford of Europe's German division.

Following the 1989 model year, Lincoln-Mercury withdrew Merkur, making it one of the most short-lived automotive brands in modern American automotive history, lasting one model year longer than the Edsel.

== Background ==
During the late 1970s and early 1980s in the United States and Canada, buyer preferences in the luxury-vehicle segment began shifting from once traditional Cadillac, Lincoln and Chrysler models towards more European-produced and inspired vehicles. As a response, the Japanese automotive industry launched luxury-oriented brands developed for North America, including Honda's Acura brand launched in 1985 and Nissan and Toyota launching Infiniti and Lexus, respectively, in 1989.

In its response, Ford created the Merkur brand in November 1983 with an expected launch for the 1985 model year. Instead of developing all-new products, Merkur adapted vehicles from Ford of Europe to meet American safety and emissions regulations. During the 1970s, the Mercury Capri had been imported from West Germany, becoming the most-imported car in the United States behind the Volkswagen Beetle.

In the initial launch of Merkur, approximately 800 Lincoln-Mercury dealers signed on to represent the brand. Advertising and PR materials urged using the German pronunciation of the brand name, German for Mercury, and vehicle emblems highlighted their manufacture by Ford Werke AG-Cologne, West Germany (Cologne Body & Assembly).

== Models ==
Merkur marketed two models: the three-door XR4Ti hatchback and the five-door Scorpio hatchback. North American regulations dictated numerous modifications, including 5-mph bumpers, FMVSS 108-compliant headlamps, and an instrument panel with non-metric gauges.

=== XR4Ti ===
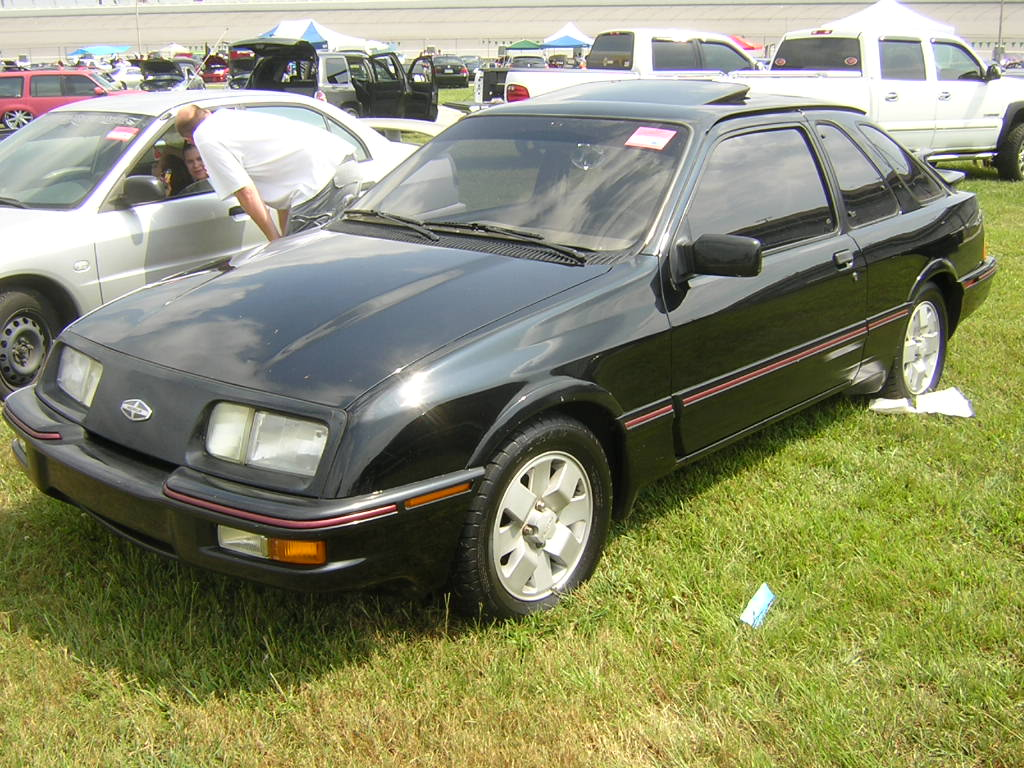
Merkur XR4Ti

Introduced for 1985 as the introductory Merkur vehicle, the Merkur XR4Ti was a performance-oriented hatchback. Sized nearly identically to the Ford Mustang hatchback, the XR4Ti was a slightly rebodied version of the Ford Sierra XR4i, the mid-range sporting model of the Sierra. Its name highlighted its turbocharged engine (see below), eschewing anything that might conflict with General Motors' branding, e.g., the GMC Sierra and Oldsmobile Cutlass Ciera nameplates.

Its engine was a modified version of the a 2.3L turbocharged inline-4 used by the Ford Mustang SVO and the Ford Thunderbird Turbo Coupe, with its intercooler deleted. The engine made 175 horsepower (130 kW) when paired with a 5-speed manual transmission and 145 horsepower (108 kW) with a 3-speed automatic transmission.

The body of the XR4Ti was shared with the Sierra XR4i, modified for American regulations and using the C-pillar windows of the 5-door Sierra and opening rear quarter windows behind the front doors. In line with the Sierra XR4i, the Merkur XR4Ti was distinguished by a large biplane rear spoiler, similar to that of the Ford Mustang SVO.

Adapting the Merkur XR4Ti for North American sale required final assembly by specialty manufacturer Karmann in Rheine, West Germany. Prior to the 1988 introduction of the Merkur Scorpio, the XR4Ti was the sole Merkur model. In early 1989, the XR4Ti was discontinued.

=== Scorpio ===
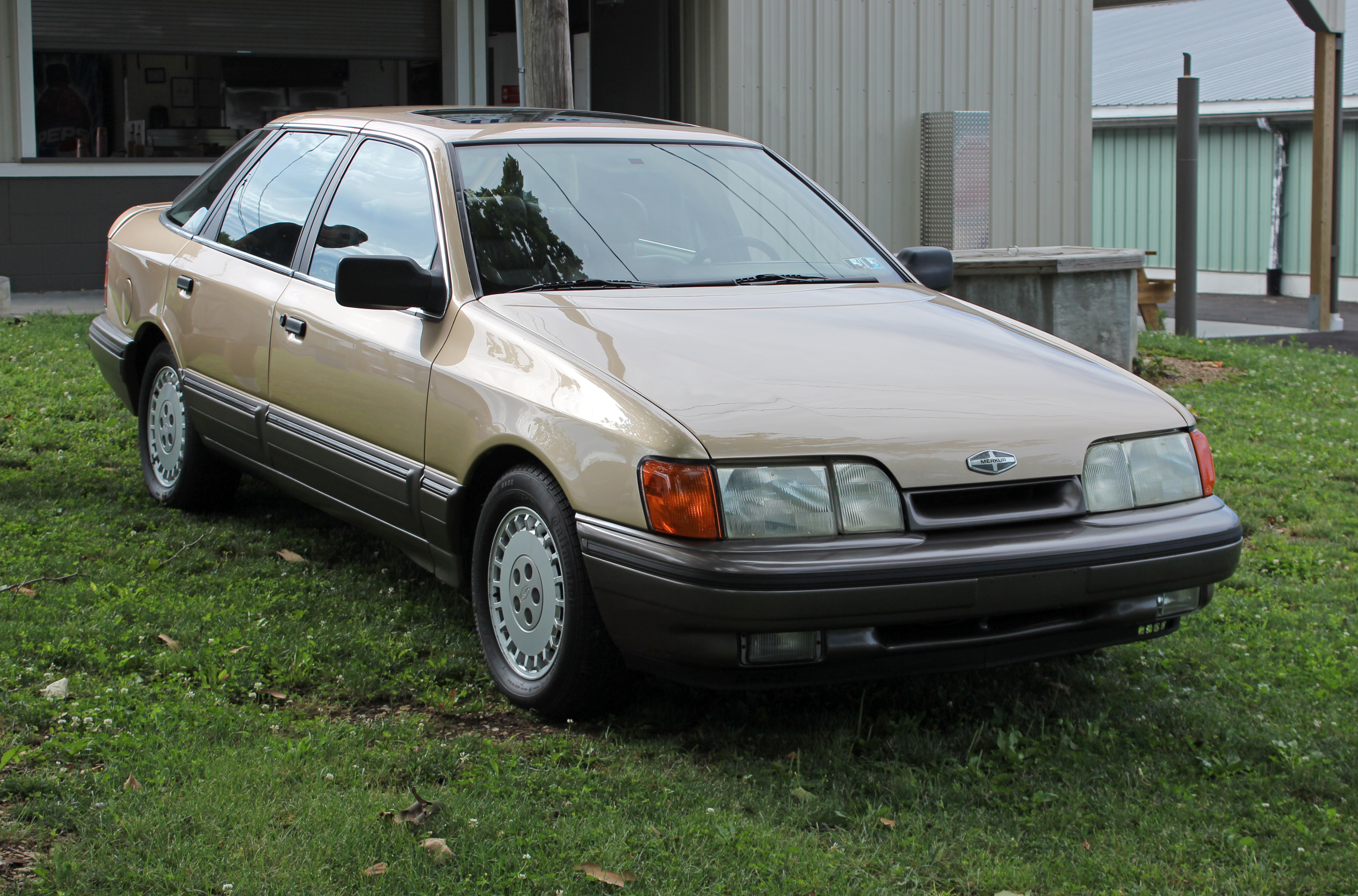
Merkur Scorpio

Introduced in mid-1987 as a 1988 model, the Merkur Scorpio targeted the executive sedan segment. Recalling the styling of the Mercury Sable and Ford Taurus, the Scorpio was an extended-wheelbase version of the Ford Sierra, making it the largest car sold by Ford of Europe.

As an entry-level luxury car, the Merkur Scorpio competed against sedans including the Acura Legend, Audi 100, Mercedes-Benz 190E, Saab 9000, Sterling 827, and Volvo 740. In sharp contrast to many of its competitors, the Scorpio was offered only as a 5-door hatchback (a configuration otherwise only offered by Saab and Sterling in North America). The model offered an optional Touring Package upgrade.

The Merkur Scorpio (unlike the XR4Ti) was assembled on the Ford Cologne assembly line in West Germany. The body was largely unchanged for North America, with the exception of 5-mph bumpers, a low profile spoiler, and US-market bumpers; Merkurs are also distinguished by badging and full-width taillamps. Powertrain modifications were minimal, as the 2.9L V6 was an engine used in North America (by the Ranger and Bronco II). While a 5-speed manual transmission was standard, nearly every Scorpio sold was equipped with a 4-speed automatic transmission.

One of the shortest-lived vehicles ever produced by Ford Motor Company, the Merkur Scorpio was discontinued at the end of the 1989 model year, marking the end of the Merkur brand.

== Discontinuation ==
In the United States and Canada, Merkur was ultimately not considered a success by Ford. Projected to sell 15,000–20,000 vehicles annually, the brand only sold 26,000 XR4Tis in its first two years; sales declined nearly 50% for 1987. On average, each Lincoln-Mercury dealer would sell one to two Merkur vehicles each year.

Several factors led to the slow sales of the Merkur line, including an unfavorable exchange rate between the dollar and the West German Deutsche mark, leading to unstable pricing. By 1989, the Merkur Scorpio rivaled the Lincoln Town Car in price, despite its strong visual resemblance to the far more affordable Mercury Sable. Alongside the lack of sales from either the Scorpio and the XR4Ti, the fate of the Merkur line was ultimately sealed by passive restraint requirements in North America. To bring the two vehicles into compliance for 1990, the two vehicles would have required the addition of airbag(s) or a passive restraint system (automatic seatbelts), requiring an expensive redesign for both model lines (the Ford Sierra and Ford Scorpio did not receive airbags until their 1993 and 1994 replacements, respectively).

As slow sales of the brand did not justify the expense of such a redesign, Ford withdrew the XR4ti in early 1989, with sales of the Scorpio ending at the end of the model year.
