= Merkur XR4Ti =

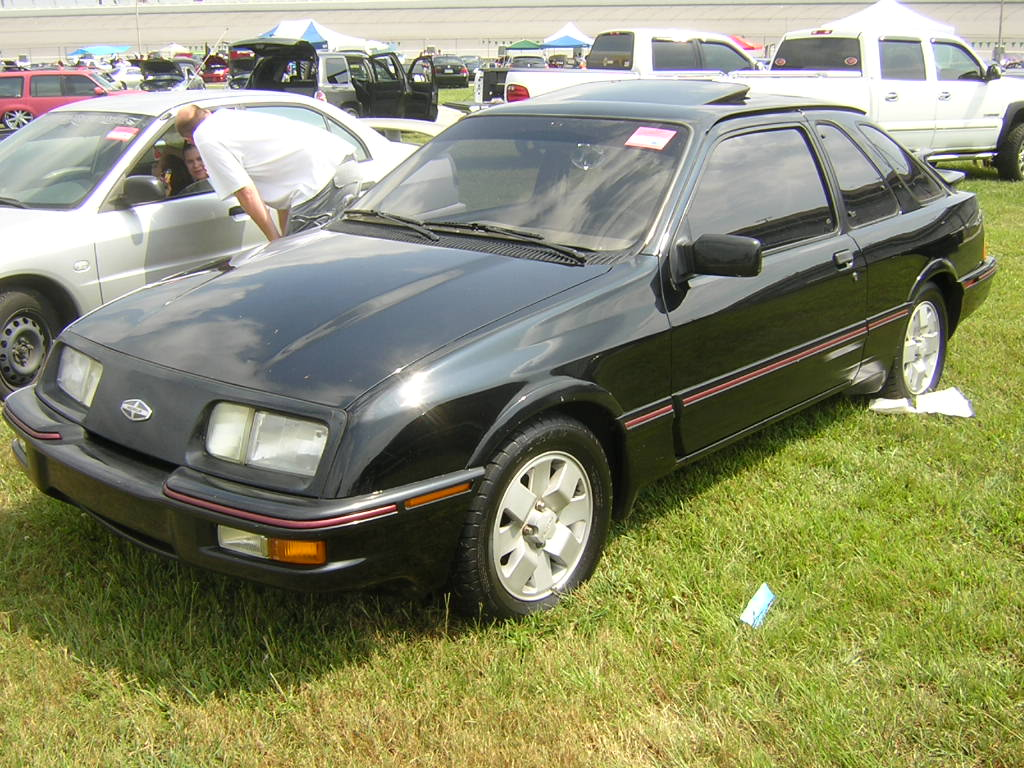

Overview
- Manufacturer: Ford of Europe
- Production: 1984–1989
- Model years: 1985–1989
- Assembly: Germany: Rheine (Karmann)
- Designer: Uwe Bahnsen; Patrick le Quément

Body and chassis
- Class: Compact car
- Body style: 3-door hatchback
- Layout: Front-engine, rear-wheel-drive
- Platform: Ford DE-1
- Related: Ford Sierra

Powertrain
- Engine: 2.3 L turbocharged Lima I4
- Transmission: 5-speed T-9 manual 3-speed C3 automatic

Dimensions
- Wheelbase: 2,610 mm (102.8 in)
- Length: 4,530 mm (178.3 in)
- Width: 1,727 mm (68.0 in)
- Height: 1,392 mm (54.8 in)
- Curb weight: 1,339 kg (2,952 lb)

The Merkur XR4Ti is a performance-oriented 3-door hatchback sold in North America from 1985 to 1989. A product of the Ford Motor Company, the car was a version of the European Ford Sierra adapted to U.S. regulations. The XR4Ti project was championed by Ford vice president Bob Lutz.

== History ==
The Sierra was the successor to Ford of Europe's Cortina/Taunus, and was developed while Lutz was chairman of Ford's European operations. Due to financial limitations the decision was made to keep the front-engine, rear-wheel-drive layout of its predecessor, and pursue improved fuel economy through advanced aerodynamics. The Probe III design study unveiled at the 1981 Frankfurt Motor Show foreshadowed the direction Ford would take with the Sierra. Responsibility for the Sierra design was handled by vice president for design Uwe Bahnsen and chief stylist Patrick le Quément. The Sierra was released in Europe in September 1982, and the performance-oriented XR4i appeared in 1983, slotted into the lineup above the Fiesta-based XR2 and Escort-based XR3. (Note: The XR name was first used by Ford on the 1967 Mercury Cougar XR-7, and has since been used on various car models and trim levels in Australia, Europe, North America, and South Africa. While some references report that the 'XR' label stood for 'eXperimental Racing', this is unconfirmed.)

Lutz spearheaded the plan to bring a version of the XR4i to North America to compete with sporty luxury imports like BMW. Although modifications would be needed, his instructions were that the nature of the car not be compromised. The XR4 for America would be turbocharged, adding a 'T' to its name while keeping the 'i' indicating a fuel injected engine, as in Europe. The 'Sierra' name was not used in North America, since it was already used by General Motors for their GMC C/K Sierra pickup truck, and sounded too similar to the Oldsmobile Cutlass Ciera.

With their own production lines occupied building Sierras for the European market, Ford contracted out assembly of the XR4Ti. Using body panels from Ford's factory in Genk, the cars were largely hand-built by Wilhelm Karmann GmbH in Rheine, Germany. The XR4Ti was introduced at a starting price of US$16,503 (equivalent to $51,100 in 2025).

Chief executive officer Pete Petersen decided that the car would be sold under the 'Merkur' brand name. The name means 'Mercury' in German, and tied the new brand to the Lincoln-Mercury dealers through which the car would be sold. Initially, 800 Lincoln-Mercury dealers enrolled to also become Merkur dealers.

Ford projected sales of 16,000 to 20,000 units per year. These targets were never met, although for the first two years they came close, with over 25,000 units sold. The car continued to struggle to establish its identity in the North American market, both with the public and with dealers.

An increasingly unfavorable dollar/Deutschmark exchange rate put upward pressure on price. By the late 1980s the XR4Ti was facing a redesign to comply with incoming safety regulations in the US. Ford dropped the 'Merkur' name in 1988, and began to refer to their two European imports by their model names only. Sales dropped off rapidly after 1986, so that in its last year fewer than 3,000 XR4Tis were sold. 1989 was the last year for the XR4Ti.

The XR4Ti was the last vehicle imported by Ford into North America from Germany until 2016, when the Ford Focus RS was introduced.

== Body, chassis, suspension ==
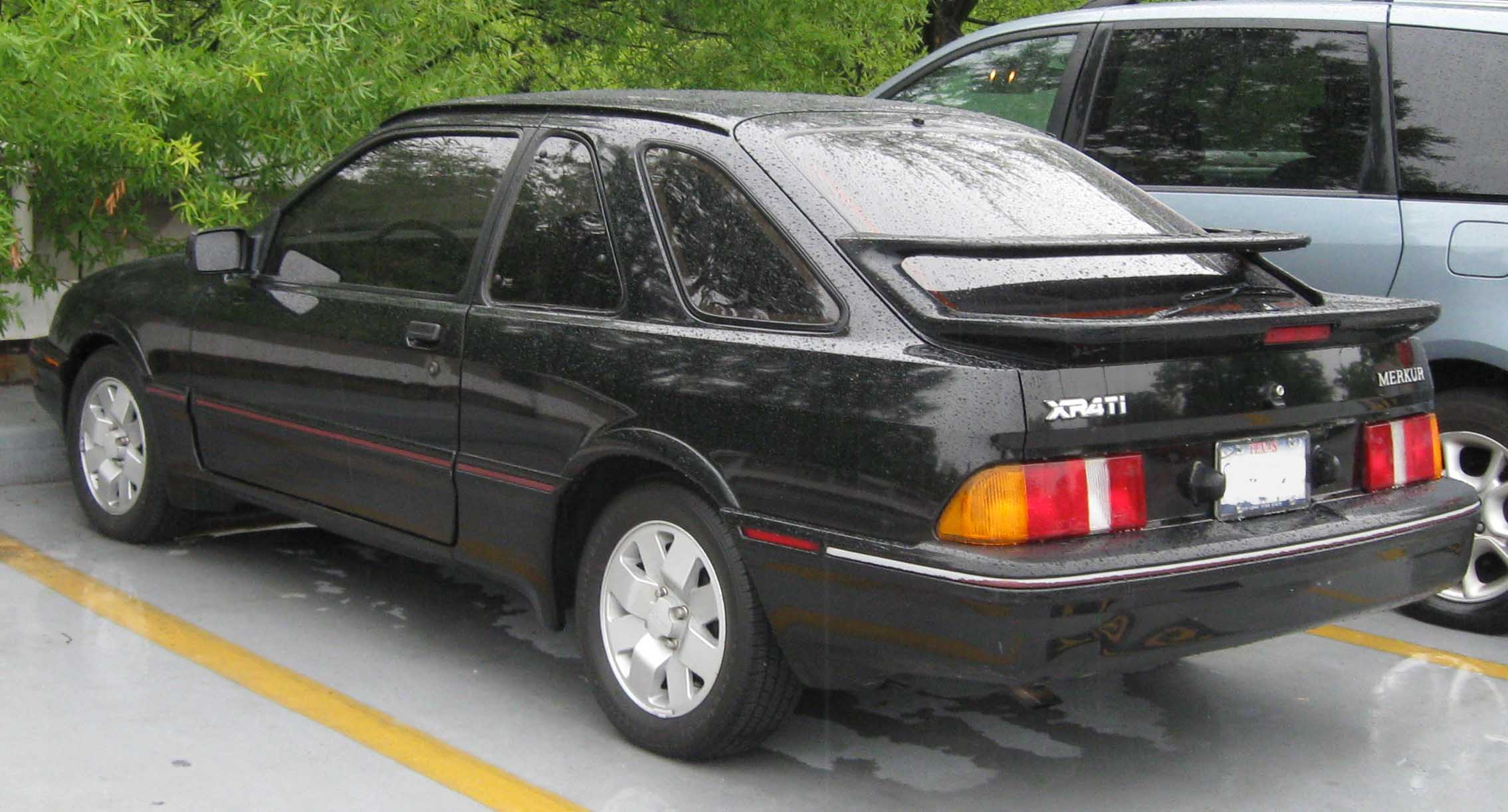
Merkur XR4Ti

The XR4Ti kept the 3-door semi-notchback hatchback body style of the XR4i, including the European version's triple side-window profile and bi-plane rear spoiler. The lower body was clad in polycarbonate 'anti-abrasion' panels that were matte grey in the early cars. The car's drag coefficient ($\scriptstyle C_\mathrm d\,$) was 0.328.

The unibody chassis of the European Ford Sierra was modified to meet US safety requirements. The floorpan had reliefs added to accommodate catalytic converters, a requirement to meet US emissions standards. Side intrusion beams were added to the two doors, and the bumpers were stretched to meet US impact requirements. To accommodate the engine for the US-spec car, the XR4Ti also received a taller hood. Altogether 850 unique parts were developed for the car destined for the US and Canada, and these changes added approximately 280 lb (127.0 kg) to the weight.

Suspension was independent front and rear. The front suspension comprised Macpherson struts with concentric coil springs and lower lateral links triangulated by an anti-roll bar. The rear suspension used semi-trailing arms with coil springs ahead of the axle half-shafts, and shock absorbers behind. An anti-roll bar was also fitted at the rear. Spring rates were softened compared to the XR4i, based on feedback from Jackie Stewart, who had been brought in as both a development tester and spokesman for the car. Steering was by a power-assisted rack and pinion with 3.6 turns lock-to-lock. Brakes were 10.2 in (259 mm) disks in front and 10.0 in (254 mm) drums at rear. The car had a two-piece driveshaft and used a giubo as a torsional damper.

== Engine and transmission ==
While the European XR4i was powered by a 2.8 L version of the Ford Cologne V6 engine, American emissions regulations meant the only engine offered in the XR4Ti was a turbocharged Lima inline-four - which was the American market version of the "Pinto" engine used in the standard version of the Sierra sold in Europe. This engine featured a cast-iron block, cast iron cylinder head with 2 valves per cylinder, and a single overhead cam driven by a timing belt. The XR4Ti engine also received a Garrett AiResearch turbocharger, fuel-injection and Ford's EEC-IV engine control unit. Built in Ford's Taubaté Brazil plant, the engine had a bore of 96.04 mm (3.8 in) and stroke of 79.4 mm (3.1 in) for a total displacement of 2,301 cc (140.4 cu in). A nearly identical engine was used in the 1983 Mustang Turbo GT and 1983 Thunderbird Turbo coupe. The XR4Ti did not have the intercooler found in the 1984 SVO Mustang or 1987-88 Thunderbird Turbo coupe. Engines in cars equipped with automatic transmissions had maximum boost set to 8 to 10 psi (0.55 to 0.69 bar) and produced 145 hp (108 kW). In cars with manual transmissions maximum boost was raised to 12 to 14 psi (0.83 to 0.97 bar) and the ECU programming was modified to allow the engine to produce 175 hp (130 kW), more than the 148 of the pushrod Cologne V6.

The second-order vibrations produced by this large four cylinder engine had been noticeable when it was used in the turbocharged Thunderbird and Cougar models. To minimize these in the XR4Ti without resorting to extreme measures such as adding balance shafts, extensive work was done to reduce noise, vibration, and harshness (NVH) in the power-train. The first measure taken to reduce NVH was to redesign the engine's external components, including the intake manifold, to increase the stiffness of the bracketing and lighten the components. The second measure was to reduce the amount of vibration transmitted to the body structure by using soft rubber engine mounts. Engine roll was controlled by wide-based mounting brackets, and engine movement due to bumps was limited by having the brackets attached to the body via hydraulic mounts.

The base transmission was a 5-speed manual Ford Type 9 unit, while a Ford C3 3-speed automatic transmission was optional.

Transmission and differential gear ratios
Gear	Manual	Automatic
First	3.65:1	2.47:1
Second	1.97:1	1.47:1
Third	1.37:1	1.00:1
Fourth	1.00:1	
Fifth	0.82:1	
Final drive	3.64:1	3.36:1

== Options and updates ==
The XR4Ti arrived on the market with an extensive list of standard and optional equipment.

1985:

- Standard equipment includes flush headlamps, variable ratio power steering, power mirrors, power disc brakes, nitrogen-pressurized shock-absorbers.
- Interior equipment includes air conditioning, a 60/40 folding rear seat, and an AM/FM stereo with integrated cassette player.
- A manual transmission is standard and an automatic is optional. Most cars are equipped with manuals.
- Tires are Pirelli P6 195/60HR14 fitted to 14-inch 8-hole "phone dial" alloy wheels.
- Other features, like power windows, power door locks, cruise control, leather seats, heated front seats, manual moon-roof, and metallic paint, are extra-cost options.

Many changes were made to the car over its five-year life. These include:

1986:

- A central high-mounted stop light is integrated into the lower rear wing.
- Windows now roll down below sill edge.
- Driver's side wiper airfoil is dropped.
- Turbocharger outlet tube is now smooth.
- Heater core is upgraded. (Late year change)

1987:

- The XR4Ti inherits many upgrades from the European Sierra Mk.II chassis, including a wider transmission tunnel and different pedal spacing.
- A monochromatic paint scheme that matches the lower body cladding color to the rest of the body becomes a mid-year option. Colors are black, red or white.
- The standard alloy wheels are upgraded to 15-inch 8-slot "pie-spoke" units.
- Tires are now Pirelli P6 195/60HR15.
- The dashboard is redesigned to address premature cracking experienced by earlier cars.
- The diamond-shaped 'Merkur' badge on the rear is replaced with simple “Merkur” text on the deck-lid.
- The fender-mounted antenna is replaced by an antenna trace bonded to the glass of the rear hatch.
- Redesigned steering reduces turns lock-to-lock to 2.42, and turning circle to 35.4 feet.
- The engine receives a new cam cover.
- The sound system is changed. Joystick balance control is removed.
- Three new paint colors are available.
- Oil level sensor and dash indicator is deleted.

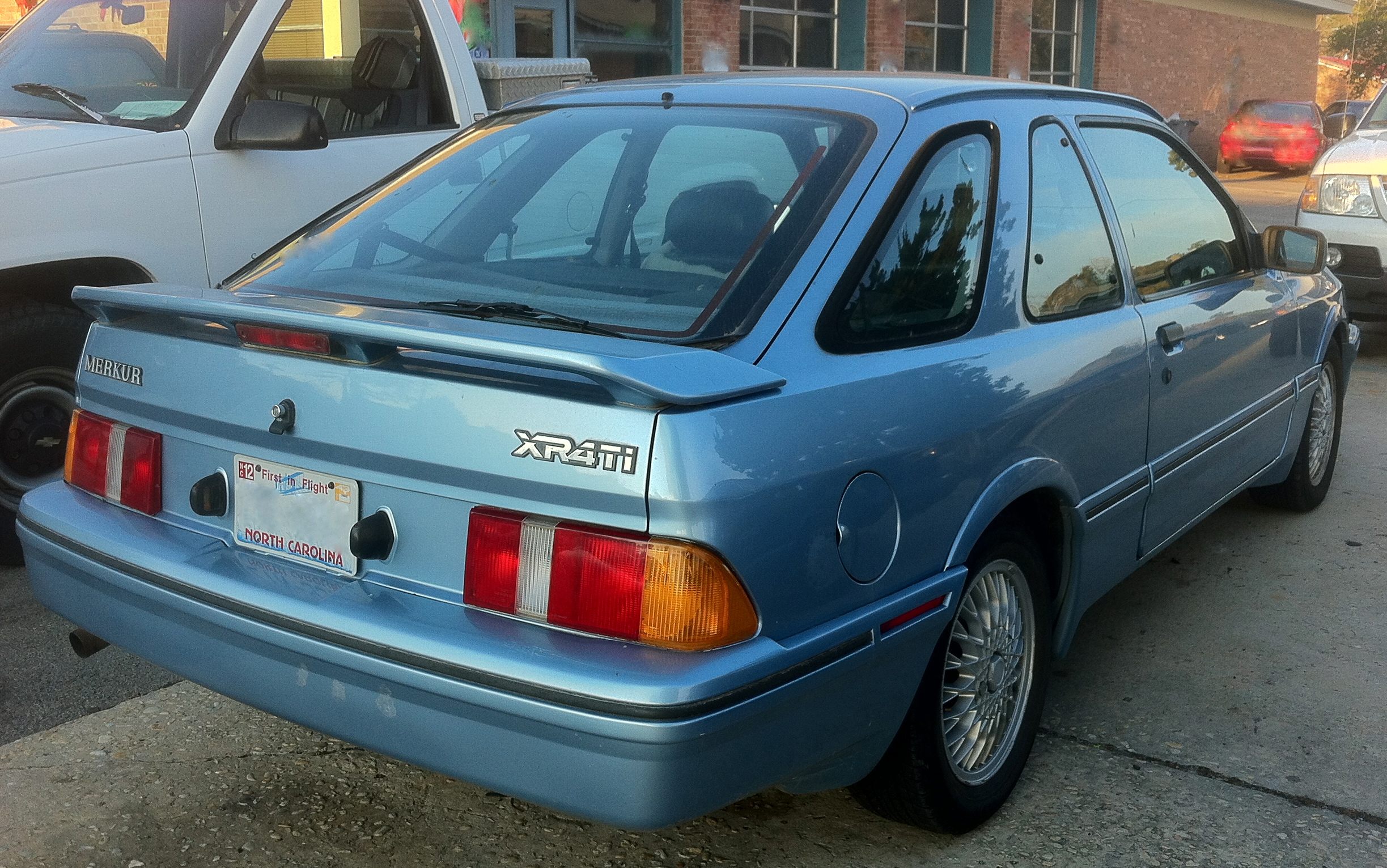
1988-1989 model with the smaller rear wing

1988:

- The bi-plane rear spoiler is replaced by a simpler single-level wing.
- The rear hatch gets a larger glass panel in the hatch with the change of wing, which combines to raise the coefficient of drag.
- The standard alloy wheels are changed to a BBS-style cast wire-spoke model.
- Beige/brown cladding now offered depending on body color.
- Speedometer scale now goes to 150 mph.
- New interior colors are available.

1989:

- The dashboard ends are shortened slightly to allow the A-pillar trim to extend past it.
- Cruise-control becomes standard equipment.
- Coolant overflow bottle is relocated.

In addition to the changes above many modifications were incorporated as Technical Service Bulletins.

== Special editions ==
Several automotive customizers produced versions of the XR4Ti that offered increased performance and improved handling. Among these were Roush, Rapido, and RC Consultants. These conversions were sold as either owner-installed kits or pre-built vehicles.

One such special, called the Scorch XS and built by Ralph Todd, replaced the Ford engine with a twin-turbocharged Nissan VG30DETT V6. Only one of these US$50,000 conversions was built; Scorch Prototype #001. It was later upgraded with larger brakes and wheels. The last magazine article featuring the Scorch listed a revised cost of US$55,000. Creation of other Scorch conversions had been started, but never completed.

Ford only offered one special edition of the XR4Ti when it launched the XR4Ti K2 in 1987, the result of a tie-in with ski manufacturer K2 Sports. This all-white model came with colored K2 logos on the front fenders and a roof-mounted ski rack. No mechanical changes were made to the K2 version.

== Performance reviews and legacy ==
In their September 1984 road test of the XR4Ti Car & Driver magazine reported a 0-60 mph time of 7.0 seconds, a 1/4 mile time of 15.5 seconds and a top speed of 129 mph (207.6 km/h). In later tests by the same magazine the car took 7.8 seconds to accelerate from 0-60 mph, leading the testers to speculate that the earlier press car might have been a ringer, a not-uncommon practice at the time. In their test data they stated the press car came with a limited slip differential, something that was not offered as standard or an option for the XR4Ti during its production. The first test car returned a combined city/highway fuel economy of 24 mpg_{‑US} (9.8 L/100 km), and generated 0.80 Gs of lateral acceleration.

Numbers from the March 1985 road test by Road & Track magazine are comparable. Their car ran from 0-60 mph in 7.9 seconds and reached the end of the quarter mile in 16.0 seconds. Lateral acceleration was measured at 0.767 Gs and the car ran through the R&T slalom at a speed of 59.7 mph. Their car's fuel economy was measured as 23 mpg_{‑US} (10.2 L/100 km).

Contemporary reviews of the car often mention either the non-intuitive pronunciation of the brand name or the car's polarizing appearance. Most praise the car's handling, while recognizing areas where it falls short of expectations. Some felt the car showed more body roll while cornering than desired. The disk/drum brake system was felt to be adequate but not outstanding. Others were disappointed that no anti-lock was offered. While Car and Driver's first report went into great detail about Ford's efforts to reduce NVH, their later tests reported that there was still noticeable vibration in the drive-line. Effective use of the car was hampered by what some felt was the engine's narrow power band.

Even after production ended the car continued to provoke widely differing opinions. The XR4Ti was on Car and Driver's Ten Best list for 1985. In 2009 however, the magazine listed that honor as one of the "most embarrassing" awards in automotive history.

In addition to Car and Driver's change of heart some have numbered the XR4Ti among the 10 worst cars ever made, and "not (Ford's) finest hour".

On the other hand, other articles have called it one of the 10 best forgotten cars, and a car that had unfairly received a bad reputation.

== Technical data ==
Merkur XR4Ti	Detail
Engine:	Turbocharged Lima I4
Bore × Stroke:	96.04 mm × 79.4 mm (3.78 in × 3.13 in)
Displacement:	2,301 cc (140.4 cu in)
Maximum power:	175 hp (130 kW) at 5,000 rpm (manual transmission); 145 hp (108 kW) at 4,400 rpm (automatic transmission)
Maximum torque:	200 ft⋅lb (271 N⋅m) at 3,000 rpm (manual transmission); 180 ft⋅lb (244 N⋅m) at 3,000 rpm (automatic transmission)
Compression ratio:	8.0:1
Valvetrain:	Belt-driven single overhead camshaft, two valves per cylinder
Induction:	Single Garrett AiResearch TO3B turbocharger with variable boost, fuel injection
Cooling:	Water-cooled
Transmission:	5-speed Ford Type 9 manual (base); 3-speed Ford C3 automatic transmission (optional)
Steering:	Power-assisted rack and pinion. 3.6 turns lock-to-lock (1985–1986); 2.42 turns lock-to-lock (1987 on)
Brakes f/r:	10.2 in (259 mm) disks / 10.0 in (254 mm) drums
Suspension front:	Macpherson struts with coil-over springs, lower lateral links, anti-roll bar
Suspension rear:	Semi-trailing arms with coil springs, shock absorbers, anti-roll bar
Body/Chassis:	Steel body and steel unibody chassis (Ford DE-1 platform)
Track f/r:	1,453 / 1,468 mm (57.2 / 57.8 in)
Wheelbase:	2,610 mm (102.8 in)
Tires f/r:	Pirelli P6 195/60HR14 (1985–1986); Pirelli P6 195/60HR15 (1987 on)
Length: Width: Height:	4,530 mm (178.3 in); 1,727 mm (68.0 in); 1,392 mm (54.8 in)
Weight:	1,339 kg (2,952 lb)
Maximum speed:	129 mph (207.6 km/h)

== Motorsport ==
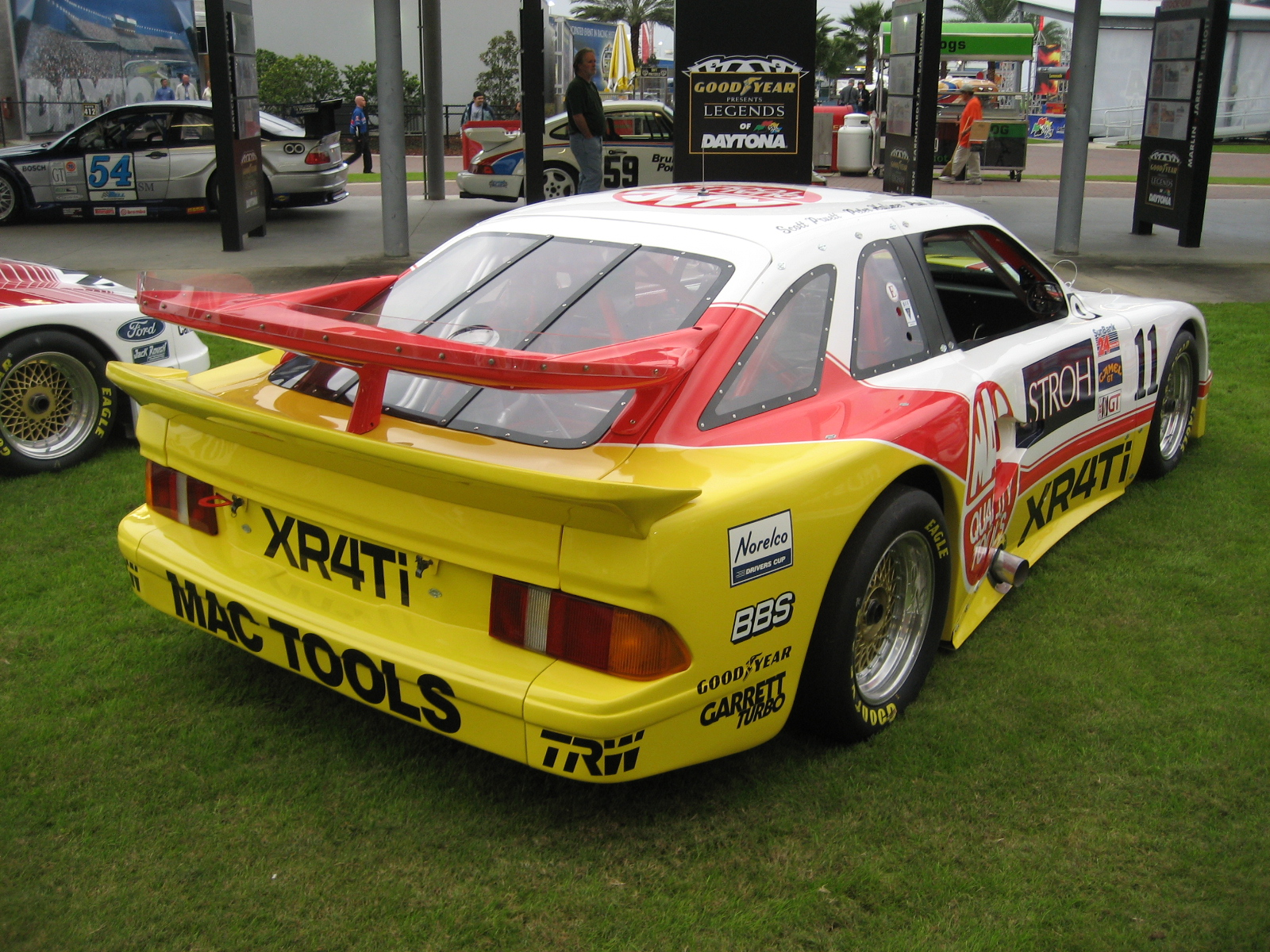
A former Trans-Am Merkur XR4Ti which won the GTO class at the 1988 24 Hours of Daytona: The large double rear wing is evident.

Despite the XR4Ti never being sold outside of the United States and Canada, Andy Rouse campaigned one in the British Saloon Car Championship. Rouse took the overall title for the 1985 season and the class title for 1986 with 14 wins. In 1986, Eggenberger Motorsport was among the few to use an XR4Ti to compete in the European Touring Car Championship and the Deutsche Tourenwagen Meisterschaft (German Touring Car Championship) with positive results.

Ford used technical feedback from the teams racing the XR4Ti to develop the 1986 Ford Sierra RS Cosworth, which first appeared on race tracks in 1987 and was superseded in mid-1987 by the Ford Sierra RS500. Some of the body panels used to stiffen the Sierra chassis and create the Merkur shell were subsequently branded 909 Motorsport parts for later adaptation to a Sierra shell. Many see the successes and failures of the XR4Ti as being the blueprint for success of the dominant RS500 Sierras.

Between 1986 and 1987, Pete Halsmer and Scott Pruett campaigned the Roush-prepped XR4Ti, although of a tubeframe construction like that of a silhouette racing car, to take the Trans-Am Series title. Along with Paul Miller, the pair also campaigned an XR4Ti successfully in the IMSA series in 1988.

== Production figures ==
Model year	Units
1985	12,400
1986	13,559
1987	7,352
1988	6,283
1989	2,870
Total	42,464

== See also ==
- Merkur vehicles
- Ford Granada (Europe)
- Ford Scorpio
