= Uwe Bahnsen =

German car designer

Uwe Bahnsen (1930 in Hamburg – 30 July 2013 in south-west France) was an accomplished German painter, sculptor and car designer, widely noted for his 28-year career at Ford Motor Company, where he designed the second-generation Ford Capri (1973), the Ford Scorpio and notably, the highly aerodynamic and unconventional Ford Sierra.

After his career at Ford, Bahnsen became a teacher, served as a director at Switzerland's Art Center College of Design in Vevey and subsequently served as president of the International Council of Societies of Design. By the time of his death in 2013, Bahsen was recognized as one of the most influential European automotive designers of the 20th Century.

== Background ==
Uwe Bahnsen was born in 1930 in Hamburg, Germany. After an apprenticeship as a window dresser Bahnsen studied at the College of Fine Arts in Hamburg. From 1958 to 1986 he held various positions with Ford Europe, ultimately as vice president for design. During this time his designs included the Taunus 17m and the Capri II. Bahnsen was also a motor sport enthusiast, and in the 1960s he organised a Ford Works Team. He was a team member involved with the design of the Mk1 Capri, working with chief stylist Phil Clark.

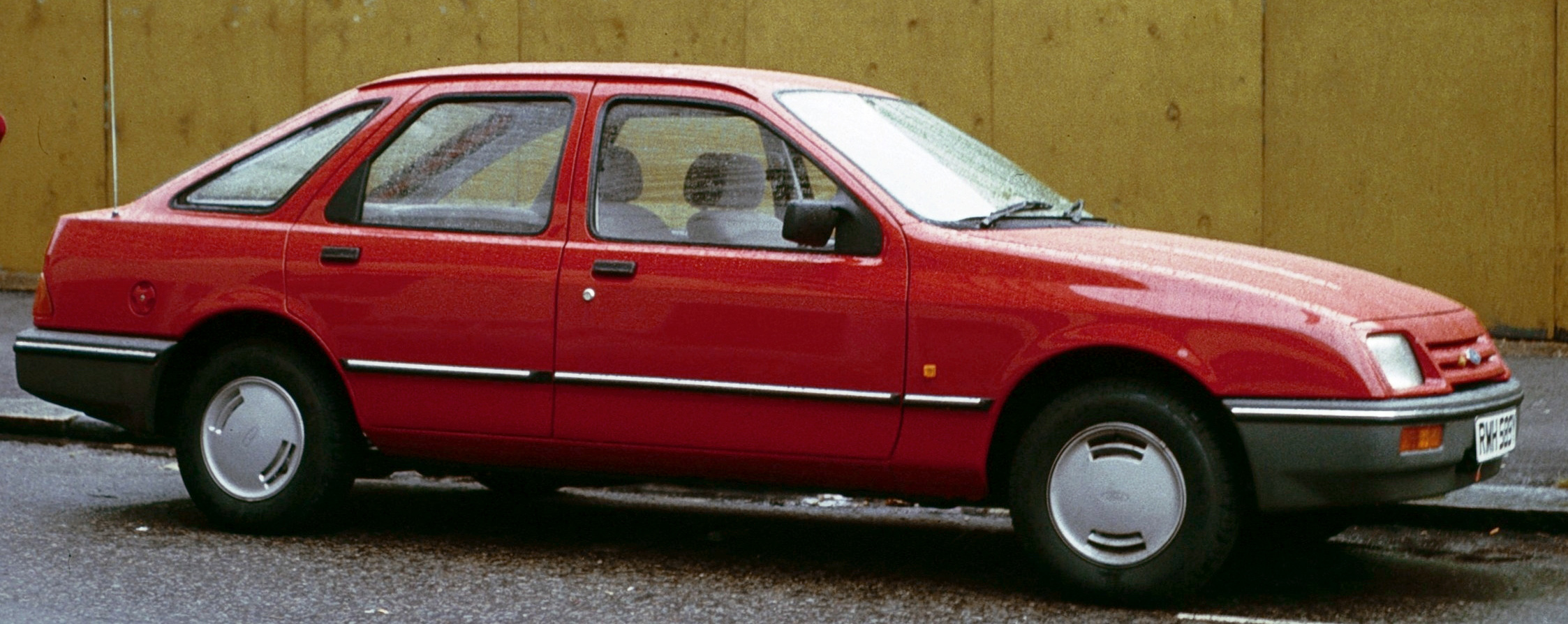
Ford Sierra MK I

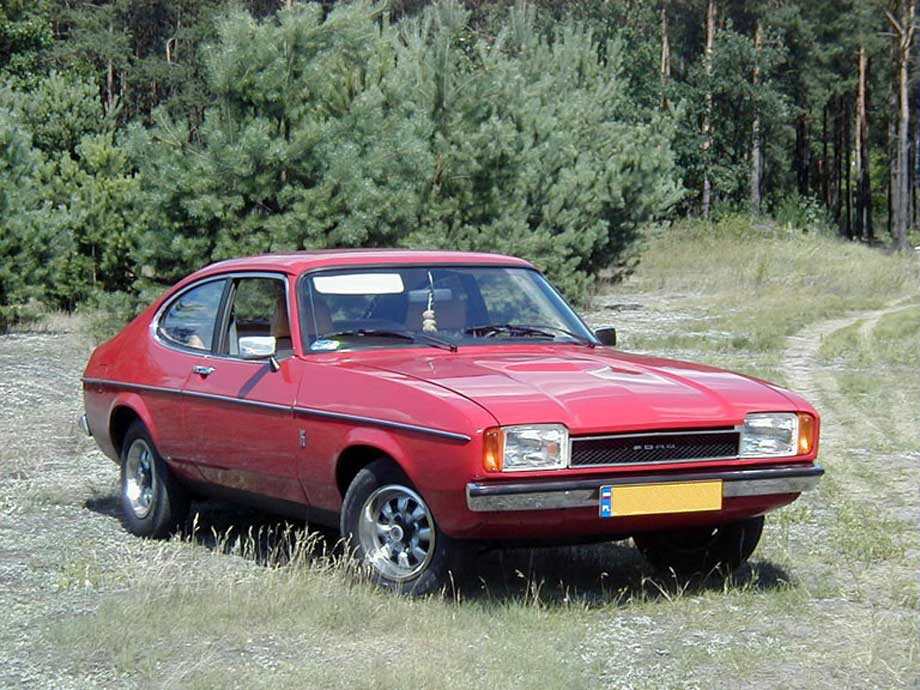
Ford Capri MkII

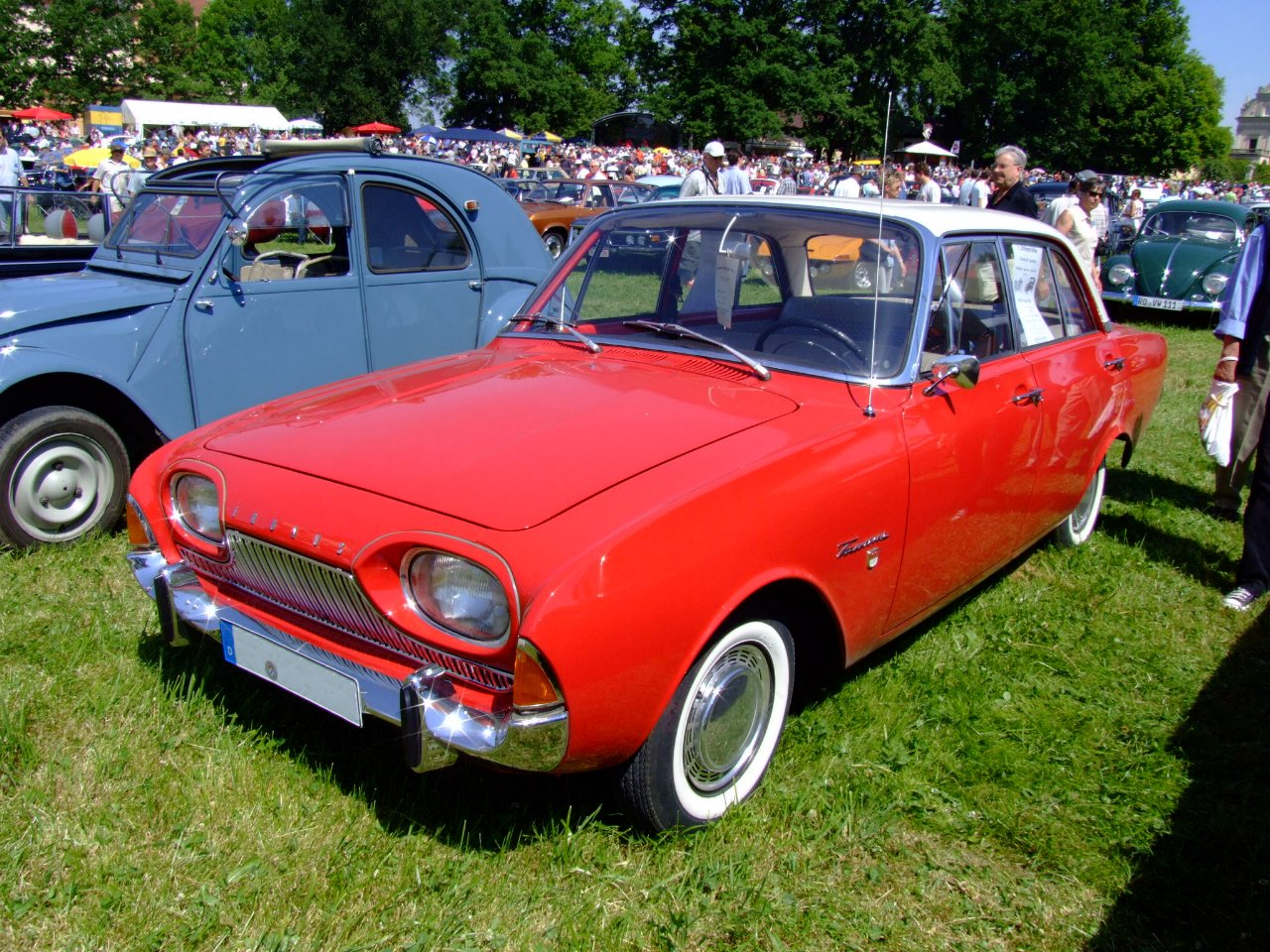
Ford Taunus P3 17M

By the mid-1970s, Bahnsen had risen to become the Vice President of design for Ford of Europe, and moved the company away from the "coke bottle" design language of the late 1960s, towards the fashionable "origami" or "folded paper" school of design, typified in his square and angular designs for the Escort Mk II (1975), Mk IV Cortina/Taunus (1976), Granada Mk II (1978) and the Escort Mk III (1980). By the early 1980s, he had moved Ford's styling language forward again to the rounded "aero" look - most famously the Ford Sierra in 1982 and the Scorpio/Granada iii in 1985 - Bahnsen's final design for Ford. CAR magazine introduced the Sierra with the headline "Sierra Shock" in 1982, After struggling against conventional competitors, the Sierra ultimately proved stylistically prescient, successful in the marketplace — and highly influential within the industry.

In 1986 Bahnsen left Ford to become training director at the Art Center College of Design in La Tour-de-Peilz (Switzerland), which he ran between 1990 and 1995. In 1992 he was elected to the executive board of the International Council of Societies of Industrial Design (ICSID) and was its president from 1995 to 1997. Uwe Bahnsen was Fellow of the Royal Society of Arts, a Fellow of the Chartered Society of Designers and International Member of the Industrial Designers Society of America (IDSA).

== Personal life and death ==
Bahnsen and his wife Maureen retired to Monflanquin in the wine country, east of Bordeaux. During his final months, they lived in Albi, near Toulouse. Bahnsen died on 30 July 2013, and he was cremated in Albi on 3 August 2013. He was survived by his wife, four children and numerous grandchildren.

== Vehicles ==
Bahnsen either directly styled or directed the design of these vehicles:

- Ford Taunus 17m "Bathtub" (1960),
- Ford Taunus TC / Cortina III (1970),
- Ford Granada I (1972)
- Ford Capri II (1974),
- Ford Escort II (1975),
- Ford Taunus TC2 / Cortina IV (1976),
- Ford Fiesta I (1976)
- Ford Granada II (1978)
- Ford Capri III, (II Facelift) (1978),
- Ford Taunus TC3 / Cortina 80/'Mk5' (1979)
- Ford Escort III (1980)
- Ford Sierra (1982)
- Ford Scorpio I / Granada III (1985)
- Ford Transit (1986)
