= Ford Type 9 transmission =

Five-speed manual gearbox

The Ford Type 9 (also T9 or Type N) is a gearbox from Ford that was used from 1982 to 1988. It was used in the Ford Capri 1.6L and 2.0L from 1984 onward; the Capri 2.8 L from 1983 onward; the Ford Sierra 1.6L, 1.8L, and 2.0L; the Sierra XR4i and the Sierra XR4x4 2.8L; the Scorpio 4x4; as well as the US-market Merkur XR4Ti and Merkur Scorpio.

Type 9 was Ford's first five-speed, rear-wheel-drive gearbox. It is based on the four-speed Type E gearbox. The fifth, or overdrive gear, was placed in the four-speed gearbox in the extension (or tail shaft) housing. This made production easier and cheaper; however, it effectively limited torque capacity to around 200 lb⋅ft (270 N⋅m).

The Type 9 is a popular choice for five-speed conversions of older Ford cars, such as the Cortina and RWD Escorts, and also for kit car builders since it comes with a separate bell housing which can be easily swapped around. Engines that were originally in front-wheel-drive (FWD) layouts are fitted to these transmissions to be placed into an RWD layout, such as in a hot rod engine swap or kit car. The gearbox has a 1-inch-diameter (25 mm) 23-spline input shaft, and the main gear housing is cast iron with a cast aluminium tail shaft housing.

Overall, the Type 9 is suited for vehicles with lower power and lighter weight. However, in applications that require more power, the Type 9 is frequently replaced with the stronger Borg-Warner T-5 transmission.

== See also ==
- List of Ford transmissions
