= Yankel =

Yankel, Yankele, Yankl, Jankiel, Jankel is a Jewish given name. It is a Yiddish diminutive (Yiddish: יאַנקל) of Jacob. It is also used as a surname.

Yankelevich is a Russian-language patronymic surname derived from the name. Other derived surnames include Janklow, Yankelova, Jankelowitz.

Notable people with the name include:

== Given name ==
- Jankel Adler
- Yankel Feather (1920-2009), British painter
- Yankele Hershkowitz
- Jacob Kruger (1869-1940) Jewish Belarusian painter
- Iankel-Meïer Nokhim-Aronovich Milkin or Jacques Milkin (1877-1944), Jewish Russian and French painter
- Yankel Rosenthal, the namesake of the Estadio Yankel Rosenthal, Honduras
- Yankel Talmud (1885-1965), Hasidic composer
- Jankiel Wiernik (1889-1972), Holocaust survivor
- Yankl Yankelevich (1905-1938), Jewish Moldavian writer and poet
- Yankel was the birth name of Yakov Yurovsky (1878-1938), Jewish Russian revolutionary, best known for the assassination of the family of Tsar Nicholas II
- Yankel Zhuravitzer (1897–1938), rabbi and underground Chabad-Lubavitch activist in the Soviet Union

== Surname ==
- Annabel Jankel
- Chaz Jankel
- Jacques Yankel
- Jennifer Jankel
- Lewis Shay Jankel
- Robert Jankel

== Fictional characters ==
- Jankiel (also translated as Yankel), fictional tavernkeeper and musician in epic poem Pan Tadeusz by Adam Mickiewicz
- Yankele ben Itzhok, the sidekick of The King of Schnorrers
