= Jankel =

British group of companies

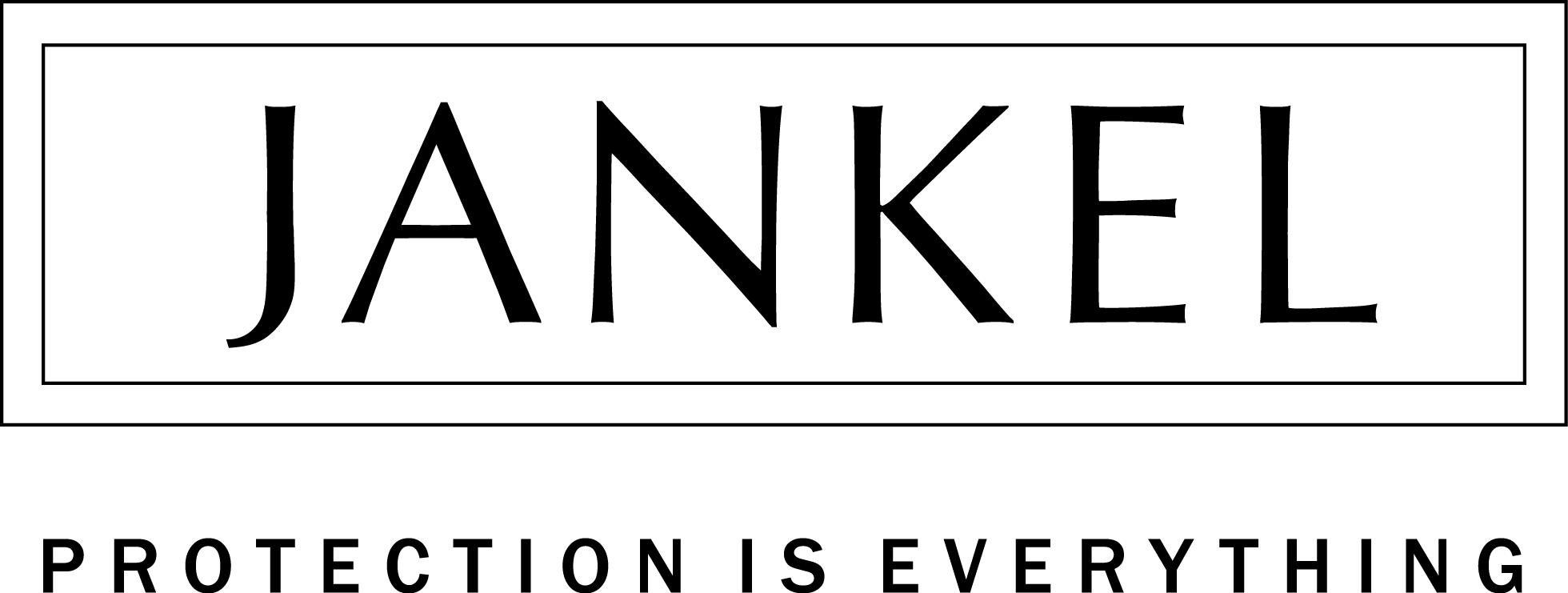
- Industry: Defence and security
- Founded: 1955
- Founder: Robert Jankel
- Headquarters: Weybridge, United Kingdom
- Key people: Andrew Jankel (Chairman)
- Products: Automotive test, evaluation, research and development inc. blast testing; protected SUVs; internal security vehicles, tactical vehicles, BLASTech seating; MAPIK
- Number of employees: >500
- Website: www.jankelts.com

The Jankel group of companies were founded by founder Robert Jankel starting in 1955. In its early years, Jankel provided specialist design and manufacturing services to improve the performance of rally and racing cars. By 1970 Jankel had established Panther Westwinds and was manufacturing production sport cars and coach-built touring limousines for VIP customers. Jankel then diversified into coachwork for the likes of Rolls-Royce, Bentley and Mercedes-Benz, specialising in armoured, Head of State vehicles. In 1997 Jankel branched out into producing vehicles for the UK MoD and Police.

The current portfolio of products and services is wholly defence and security focused and covers the design, development, prototyping and production of armoured vehicles, light tactical vehicles, counter terrorism vehicles and equipment, and customised occupant survivability solutions for military, security, government, aid agencies and NGOs.

== History ==
Robert Jankel founded the Jankel Group in 1955 and remained an active member of the Jankel Group until his death on 25 May 2005. He had been diagnosed with pancreatic cancer in 2002. Jankel had married Jennifer Loss, daughter of bandleader Joe Loss, in 1962. The couple have three sons and a daughter.

Following the death of Robert, his son Andrew took over the helm of Jankel. Andrew had worked under his father since leaving school at 18.

=== Pre-defence/security focus ===
From its formation in 1955, Jankel had been a relatively small concern, focusing on coachbuilding. On a parallel path Robert Jankel had established Panther Westwinds in 1972. Panther was a manufacturer of sports cars based on commercially available mechanical components from manufacturers such as Jaguar, Vauxhall and Ford. Panther Westwinds went bankrupt in 1979 and it was subsequently sold to South Korean businessman Young Kim. Jankel then turned his attention back to the Jankel Group and concentrated on building specialist versions of cars from other high-end manufacturers, mostly Rolls-Royce, Bentley, Mercedes-Benz, Jaguar and Range Rover.

From 1983 to 1989, Jankel was the exclusive subcontractor to Rolls-Royce Motor cars to build more than 130 units of the Silver Spur Limousine, a 42-inch extension of the standard vehicle. For Land Rover, he built a number of specialist hunting and all-terrain Range Rover vehicles for Middle Eastern customers. In 1992 he built the Jankel Tempest, a Chevrolet Corvette-based super car, with ultra-luxury interior and 6.7 litre supercharged V8, which produced 535 bhp and was capable of 200 mph, as well as holding the 1992 Guinness Book of Records 0-60mph acceleration record of 3.89 seconds.

From the mid-1980s the company also supplied discreetly armoured saloon cars to the British and other governments, as well as commercial customers worldwide. Around 30 units per year were produced. Jankel bought back the Panther name in 2001 and was reportedly working on a new Panther sports car at the time of his death.

=== Defence/security focus ===
In 1997 Jankel branched out into producing vehicles for the UK MoD and Police. Defence and security are now Jankel's primary areas of business.

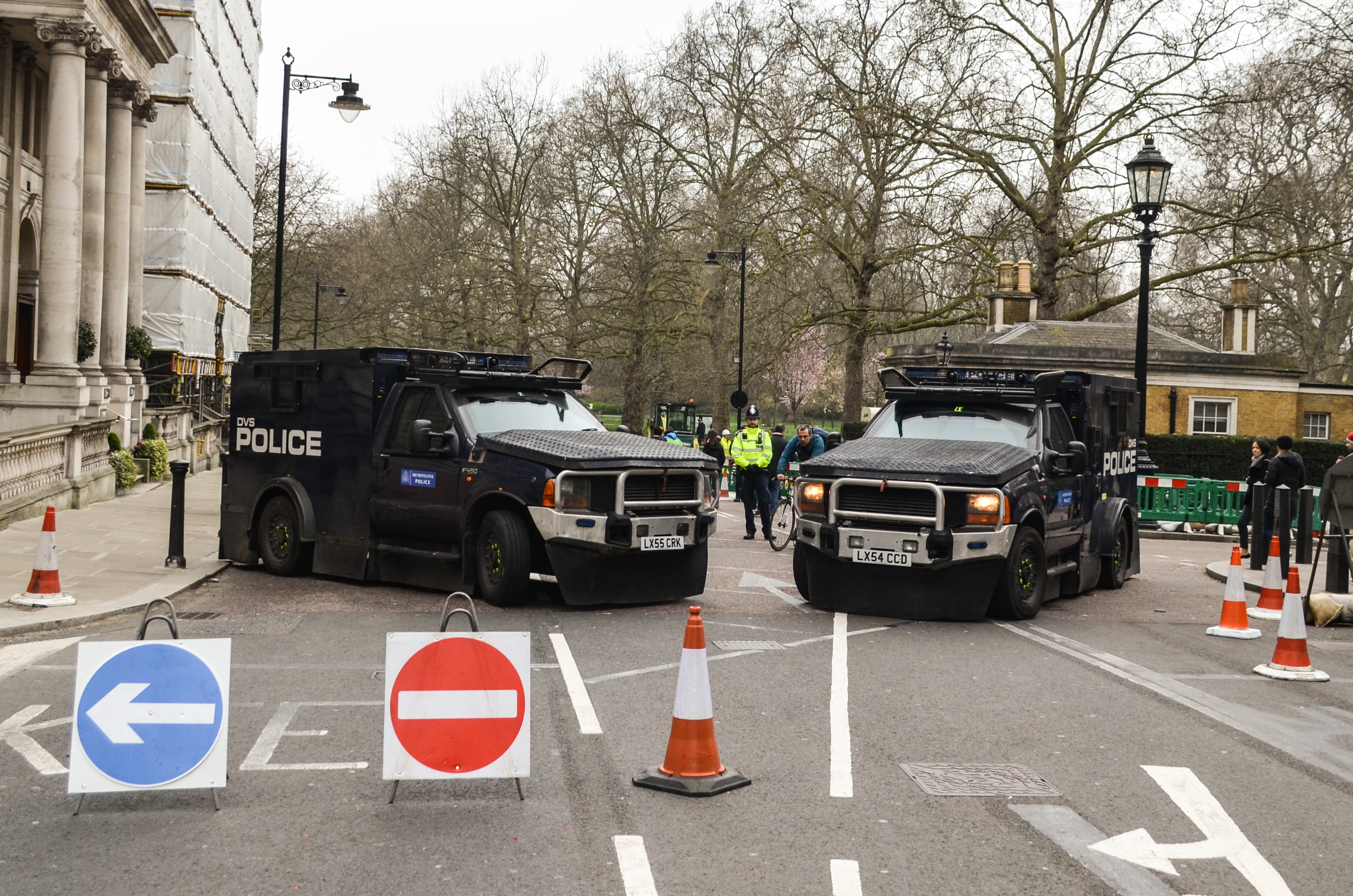
Metropolitan Police Ford F450 Jankel Guardian vehicles around Parliament Square in the aftermath of the 2017 Westminster attack

In the mid 1990s Jankel was approached by the UK MoD to see if the company would be interested in bidding for government work, and in 1997 Jankel branched out into producing vehicles for the UK MoD and Police. Defence and security are now Jankel's primary areas of business. Jankel's first defence/security-related vehicles were armoured Jaguars for the RUC in 1997. These were followed by a specialist fleet of Guardian counter-terror/anti-riot vehicles for the Met and then Essex Police forces. These Ford-based designs were to replace Land Rover-based designs which had been found wanting in areas of space and performance. Jankel also introduced the Aigis discreet paramilitary vehicle, this based on General Motors K series chassis and automotives. The UK MoD ordered a number of different Aigis-based designs around 1999–2000, and in 2000 four examples were ordered by Jordanian Special Operations Command.

Following on from success with VIP customers, Jankel identified the Middle East as a key market, and it was this that brought about the development of the relationship with King Abdullah II Design and Development Bureau (KADDB), part of the Jordanian Armed Forces in The Hashemite Kingdom of Jordan. Jankel entered into a collaborative venture with KADDB in 1999 and in 2003 the formation of the joint venture concern Jordan Light Vehicle Manufacturing (JLVM) was announced. Orders disclosed around this time included 60 AB2 Al-Jawad and 500 examples of the Desert Iris, the latter a light strike buggy-type design. JLVM's facility encompasses eight production lines and is located on an area of approximately 40,000m². JLVM has a production strategy of ‘Build to Order’ and/or ‘Engineer to Order’ for the customer's specific requirements, ranging from soft skin and special purpose vehicles, to fully armoured internal security vehicles (ISVs) based on a variety of commercial off the shelf chassis.

In 2004, Jankel secured its first Long Term Supply Agreement with the United Nations, for a range of armoured Toyota Land Cruiser vehicles, this leading to the expansion of the JLVM. Also in 2004 JLVM disclosed details of its Al Thalab (Fox) Long-Range Patrol Vehicle (LRPV), this designed primarily for internal security, reconnaissance, and border patrol operations in arid, remote, and high-altitude areas of operation. The original Al Thalab was based on a tropical specification Toyota '79 Land Cruiser chassis. Jordan's armed forces received around 200 Al-Thalabs. The first export order was for 15 vehicles to Mauritania. Other export customers have included Botswana, Brunei, Indonesia, Italy, Oman, South Korea, and Spain. The most recent 79 Series-based order was announced at Eurosatory 2018. Masstech of France has delivered 30 vehicles to meet France's urgent VPS 2 (Le Véhicule Patrouille SAS) requirement.

The Iraq War (and then Afghanistan) and the increased intensity of IED attacks would generate substantial business for the company. The first related armouring contract was to upgrade the British Army's Land Rover WMIK. For the WMIK, and other vehicles without an occupant protection system, from around 2005 Jankel developed its MAPIK product, a quick-fit, lightweight modular armour system to provide zoned ballistic and fragmentation protection. The company was also contracted to develop and certify an armour solution for the 700 Supacat Jackal vehicles for the UK MoD. As part of this process Jankel discovered that all the seats available on the market were not fit for purpose to protect the soldiers in light vehicles from blast acceleration in particular. The company then developed and patented its own armoured seat solution, BLASTech. Having developed the BLASTech seat design the company undertook a survey of Mine Resistant Ambush Protected (MRAP)-type vehicles to discover many were lacking in the required armoured seat protection. Around the same time, the US Army Research Laboratory (ARL) were undertaking an armoured seat study following a number of fatalities. Jankel participated and supplied seats for testing. To comply with ‘made in USA’ requirements the company established a factory in Duncan, South Carolina. Since its first order in 2011 Jankel has supplied over 90,000 seats to date from this 90,000 sq ft facility. Vehicles fitted with BLASTech seats include those produced by Navistar, Oshkosh and General Dynamics.

Jankel's US facilities have since grown to offer all of Jankel's capabilities to US, Canadian and Latin American customers. Jankel is now an established supplier to various US agencies including the DoD, SOCOM, DoS, CBP, and the Marshalls.

In 2008 Jankel unveiled the prototype of the Hunter, an internal security vehicle based on the Toyota Land Cruiser 79 Series chassis.

It was disclosed in August 2009 that the now Fiat Chrysler Automobiles (FCA) had appointed Jankel as a worldwide distributors for the Jeep J8 to supply to government and military customers. The J8 is a militarised Jeep Wrangler JK. Jankel further modified the J8 and offered the product under the trading name of JGMS (Jeep Government & Military Sales). Jankel's first J8 customer was the US Government who, in 2011, purchased a fleet of kit-enhanced J8 Jeeps for UN peacekeeping operations. The Jeep JK was replaced by the Jeep JL in 2019, and the JK-based J8 is no longer available.

Jankel had offered discreetly armoured saloon cars and ultily vehicles/SUVs including the Toyota Land Cruiser since the mid-1990s, but in 2013 introduced hot-formed armour technology to the Land Cruiser 200 Series. According to the company, conventional armouring comprises hundreds of individual pieces of flat armour, this being reduced to just 36 pieces of hot-formed armour for the 200 Series. Using hot-formed technology, application time is reduced by about 80% to 20 hours per vehicle. The Jankel-armoured Land Cruiser 200 Series is certified to German VPAM standard.

=== Continuing success ===
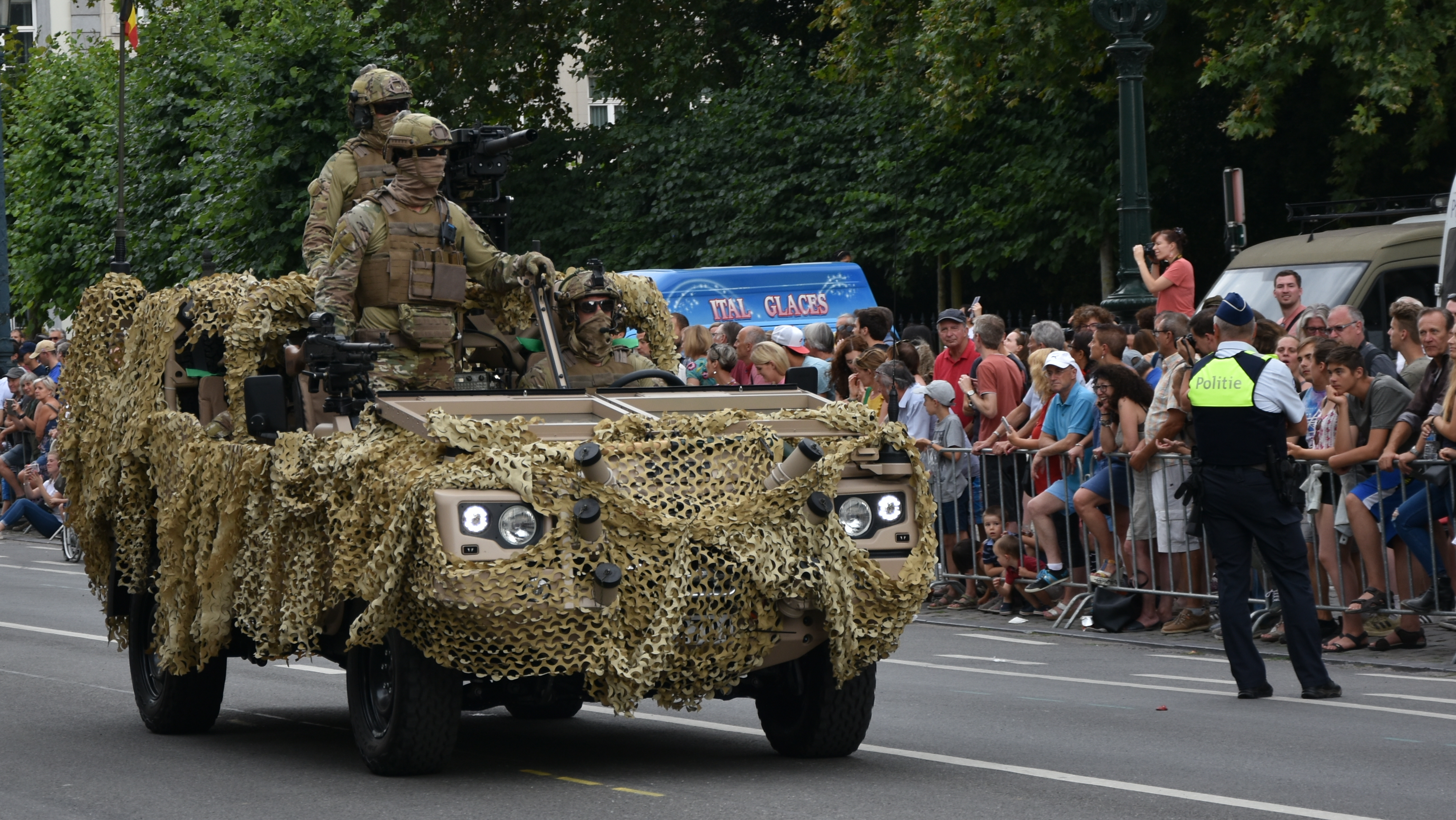
Jankel announced in January 2016 a contract for 108 Jankel Fox Rapid Response Vehicles (RRVs)

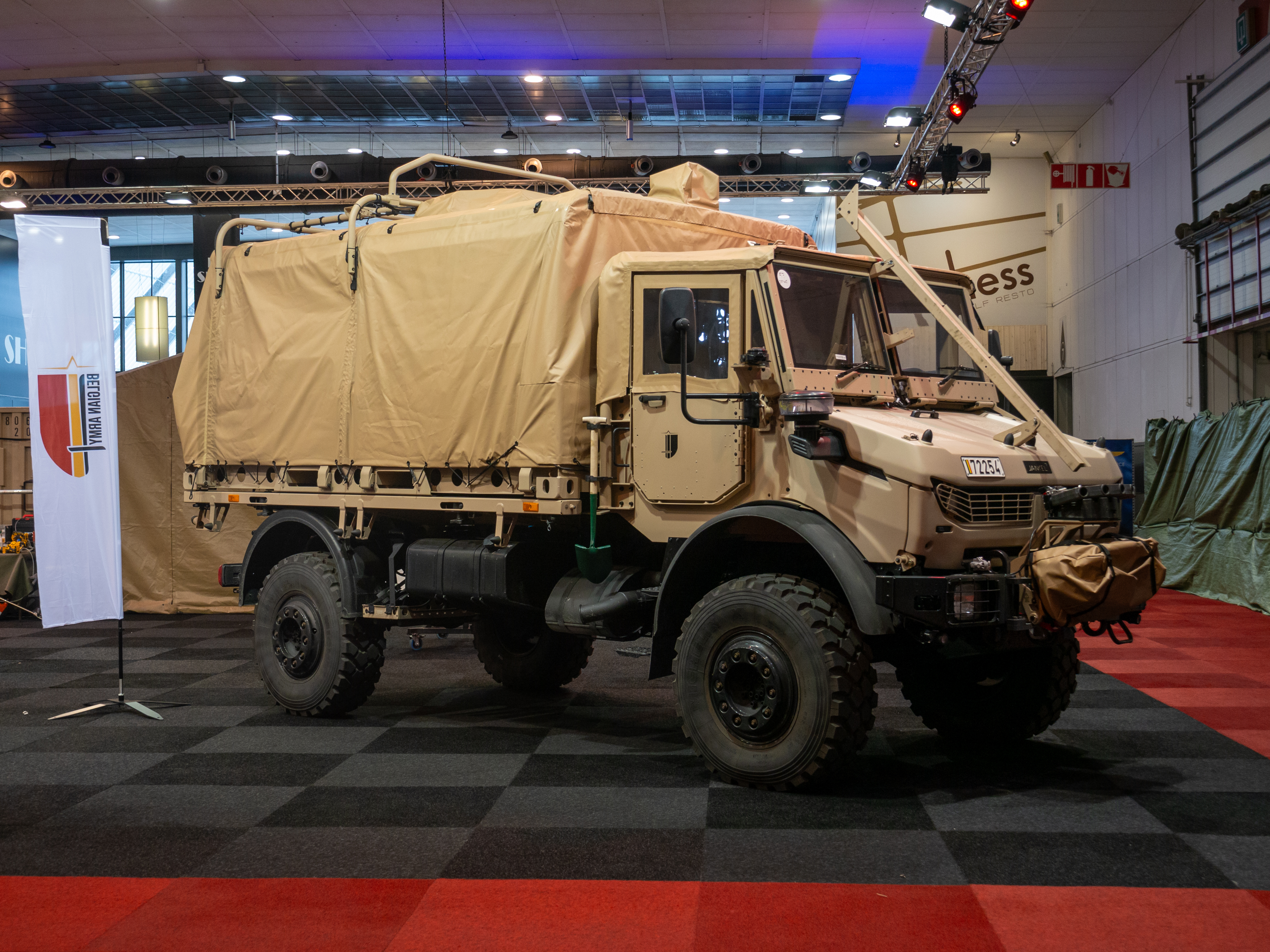
Jankel LTTV based on Mercedes-Benz Unimog U5000 for Belgian Army

Jankel announced in January 2016 that the Belgian government had awarded the company a contract for 108 Jankel Fox Rapid Response Vehicles (RRVs). These are the first Fox family vehicles to be delivered on the Toyota Hilux chassis. Fox variants are now available on either a Land Cruiser or Hilux chassis. In addition to the base vehicles, Belgium has ordered 38 removable protection kits and ring mounts for mounting 12.7 mm HMGs or 40 mm AGLs on 60 of the vehicles (all 108 can mount 7.62 mm MGs). Jankel will also provide 76 mm smoke grenade launchers, communications antennas, and installation kits for (government-furnished) communications equipment.

In March 2018 Jankel announced a second award from the Belgian MoD, this a contract for 199 Light Troop Transport Vehicles (LTTVs) that will be delivered between 2019 and 2021. Based on a Mercedes-Benz Unimog U5000 chassis, the LTTV fleet will be procured in four variants: special operations forces (SOF), rangers, ambulance and command post. The rear portion of each vehicle, known as the ‘mission module’ can be completely removed and interchanged between different base platforms.

In September 2018 Jankel displayed a new 6x6 variant of the Fox light tactical vehicle range. The 6x6 Fox has a gross vehicle weight (GVW) of 6,300 kg with a configurable payload of up to 3,000 kg and is capable of speeds up to 155 km/h at maximum GVW. For the new 6x6 variants, Jankel partnered with NSV and MDT of Australia and the vehicles use Multidrive technology that has been used commercially and was originally developed in Australia and manufactured by NSV. The company also announced their achievement of Direct Partnership certification from Mercedes-Benz. This partnership arrangement gives Jankel access to otherwise unavailable levels of technical information and support from Mercedes-Benz.

During the first three months of 2019 Jankel announced ‘production ready’ status for the latest generation of the Hunter Tactical Intervention Vehicle (TIV). The Hunter TIV will be built at JLVM. At the time of the announcement Jankel revealed that the company had over 350 vehicles in service across 11 countries in the Middle east and neighbouring regions. The company also made two US-related announcements: Jankel Tactical Systems was awarded contracts to supply armoured Chevrolet Suburbans and Toyota Land Cruisers to the US Marshals Service and the US Customs and Border Patrol, and was also awarded three contracts to supply BLASTech mitigation seats to a US based MRAP provider. The contracts value is undisclosed but stated to be multi-million dollar. In October 2019 the company announced the award of a Lifecycle Management Services (LMS) contract by the US DOD. The award (initially of a 12-month duration) will see Jankel delivering a service provision package in support of a wide range of non-standard tactical and armoured military and civilian vehicles. Within the range of supported platforms will be Jankel's own civilian armored vehicles (CAVs) and multiple other tactical wheeled vehicles and all-terrain vehicles (ATVs), operated by US DOD.

=== Financial difficulties and Administration ===
By early 2024, Jankel Armouring Limited’s ongoing financial difficulties stemming from the late delivery of Unimog based LTTV vehicles to the Belgian MoD worsened. Administrators were appointed in spring and initially sought buyers for the company as a whole. Following a lack of interest in an outright sale, a buyer was sought for the company’s assets.

NP Aerospace of Coventry acquired some of the remaining Jankel intellectual property assets in summer 2024, and hired a small number of the remaining workforce with National Security and Investment Act (NSIA) approval. US based Jankel Tactical Systems remains under the control of Andrew Jankel.

== Organisation ==
The company's current UK HQ is Hamm Court Farm, Weybridge, Surrey. The current Chairman of Jankel Group and Jankel Holdings Inc. is Andrew Jankel, son of founder Robert Jankel.

From around 30 employees when current chairman Andrew Jankel took over the company, Jankel now employs over 500 people globally; 150 in the UK; circa 75 at each of two facilities, Weybridge and Rustington, 80 in South Carolina in the US, and 270 in Jordan.

=== Foreign branches ===
Jankel has a joint venture in Jordan with King Abdullah II Design and Development Bureau (KADDB), Jordan Light Vehicle Manufacturing LCC, which was established in 2003 and went defunct by 2015.

Jankel's US subsidiary, Jankel Tactical Systems, was founded in 2008 and US turnover is now in the region of $35 million a year.

== Products ==
- Al-Thalab
- Fox Rapid Response Vehicle
- Guardian
- Jackal (vehicle)
- LTTV

== Gallery ==
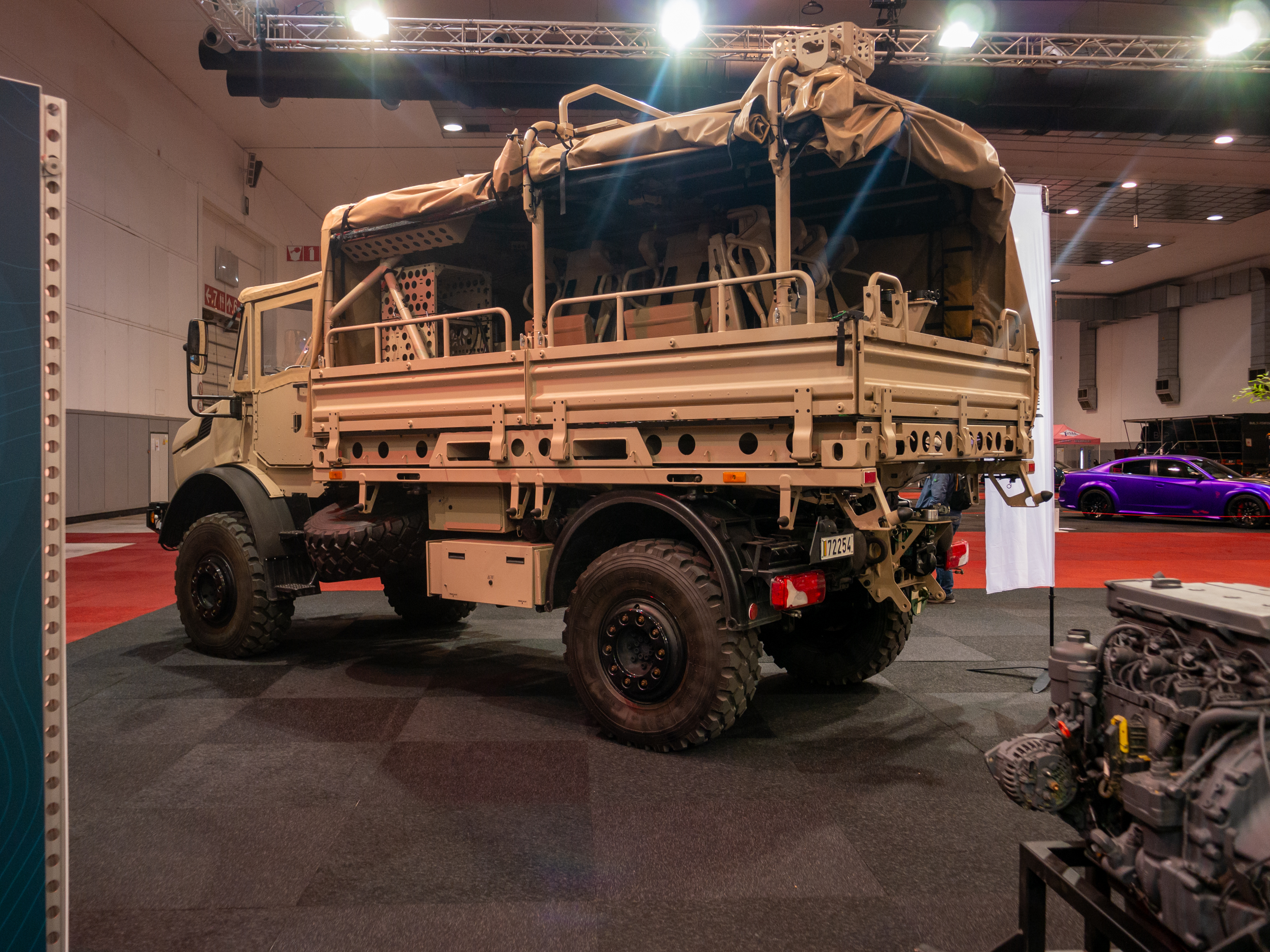
Jankel LTTV Mission module vehicle for Belgium Special Forces

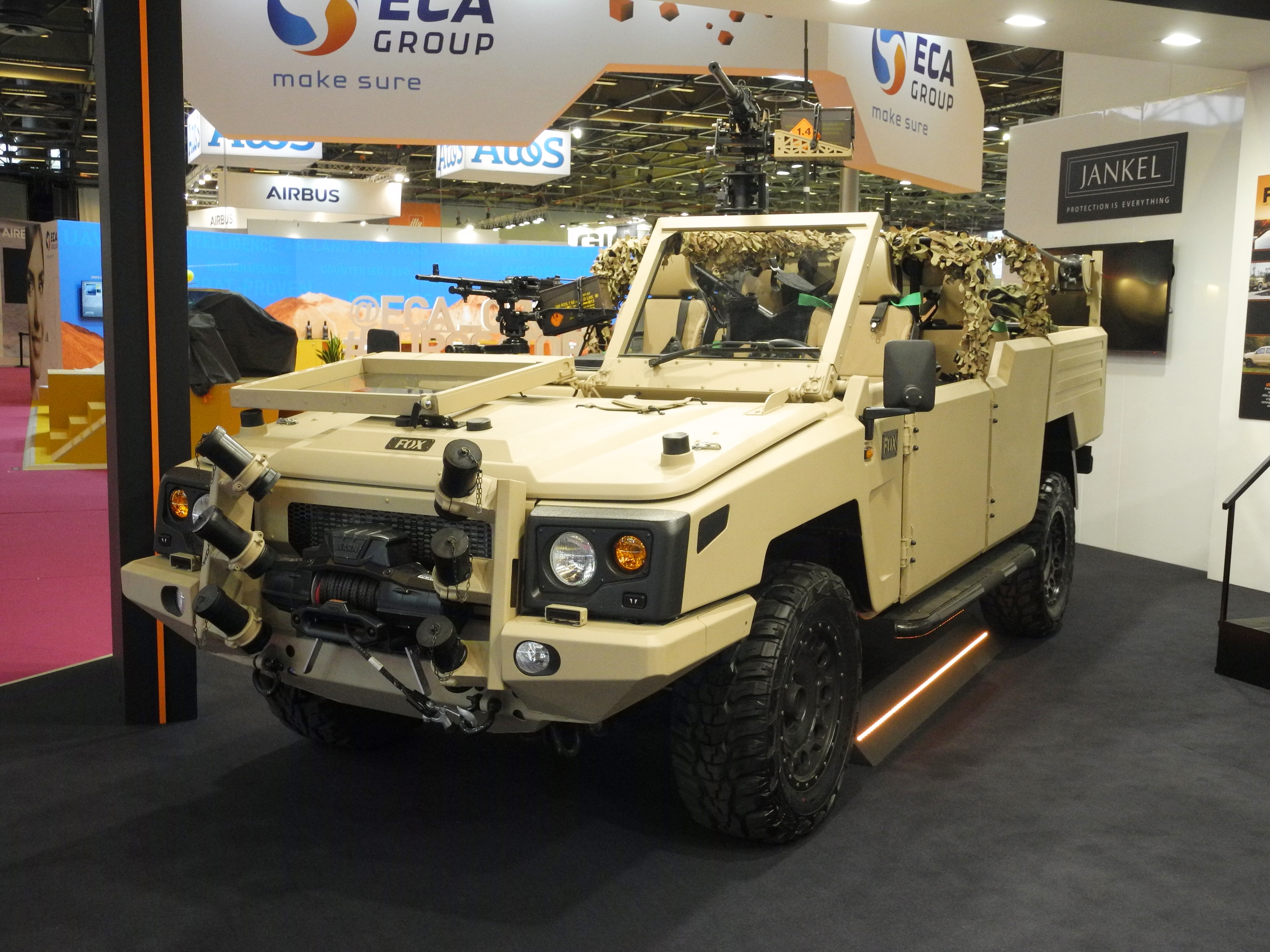
A front three-quarter view of Jankel's Fox RRV as displayed at Eurosatory 2018.

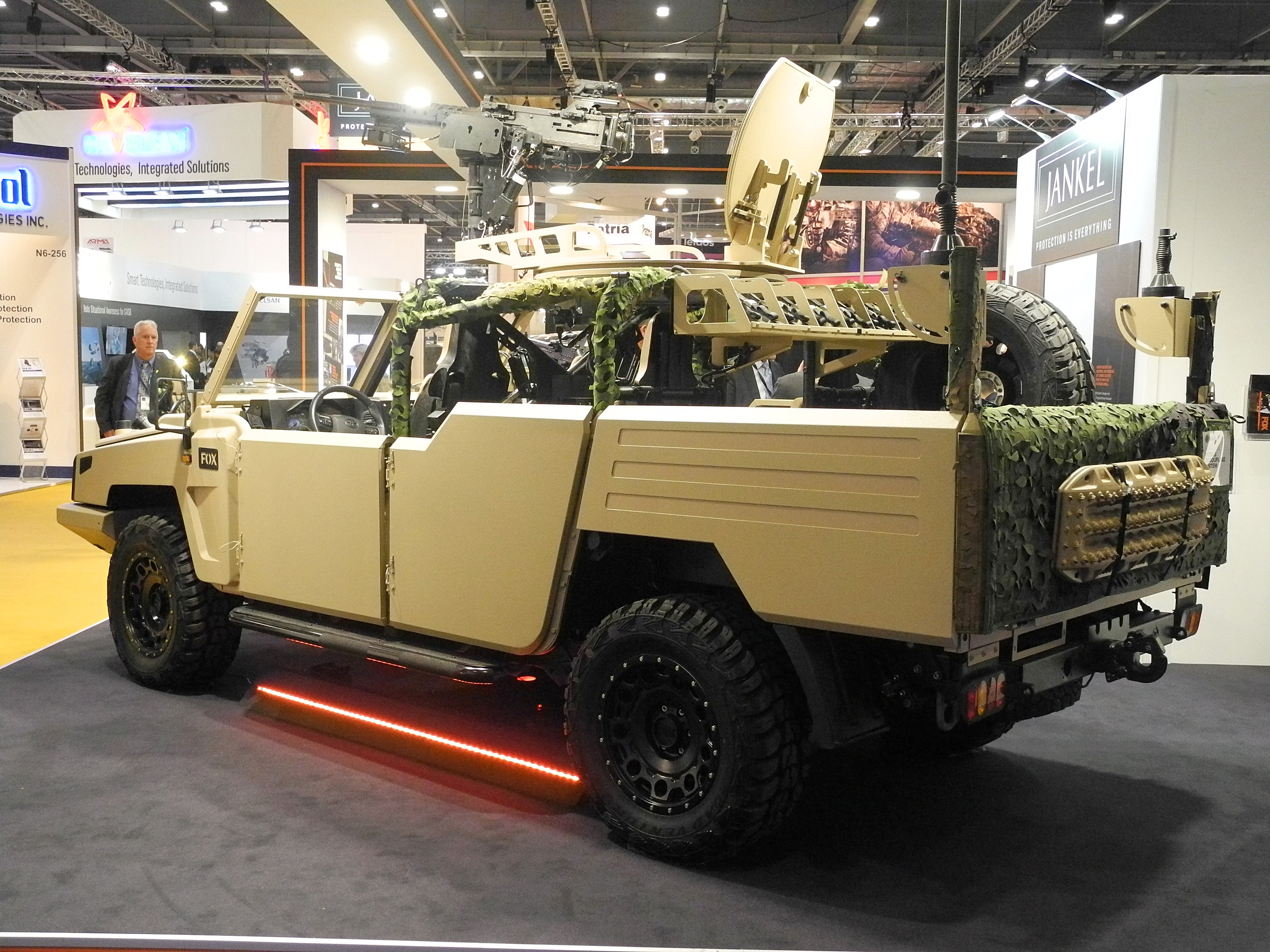
A rear three-quarter view of Jankel's Fox RRV as displayed at DSEi 2017.

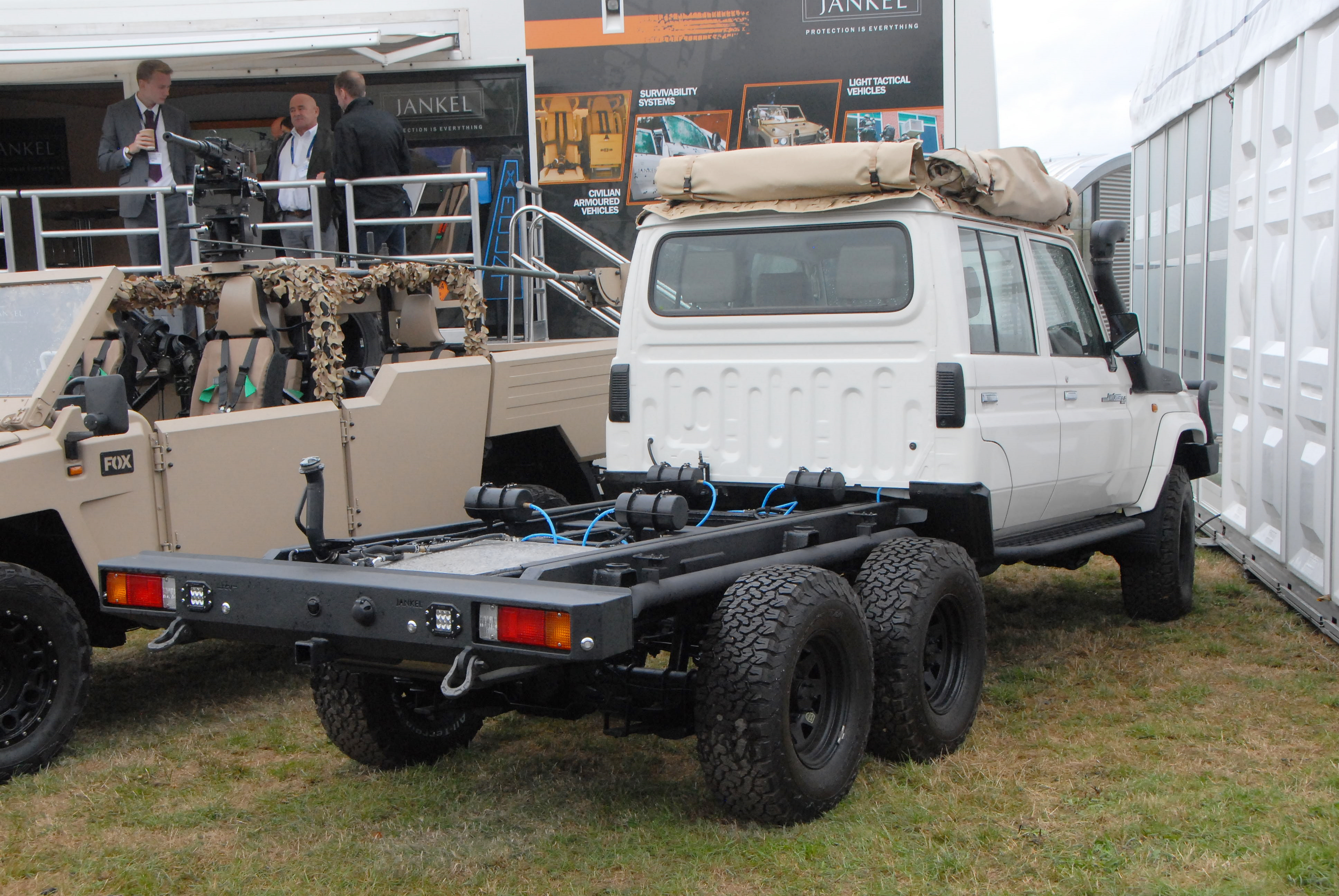
For the 6x6 variants of the Fox disclosed in 2018 Jankel has partnered with NSV and MDT of Australia. The vehicles use Multidrive technology that has been used commercially and was originally developed in Australia and manufactured by NSV.

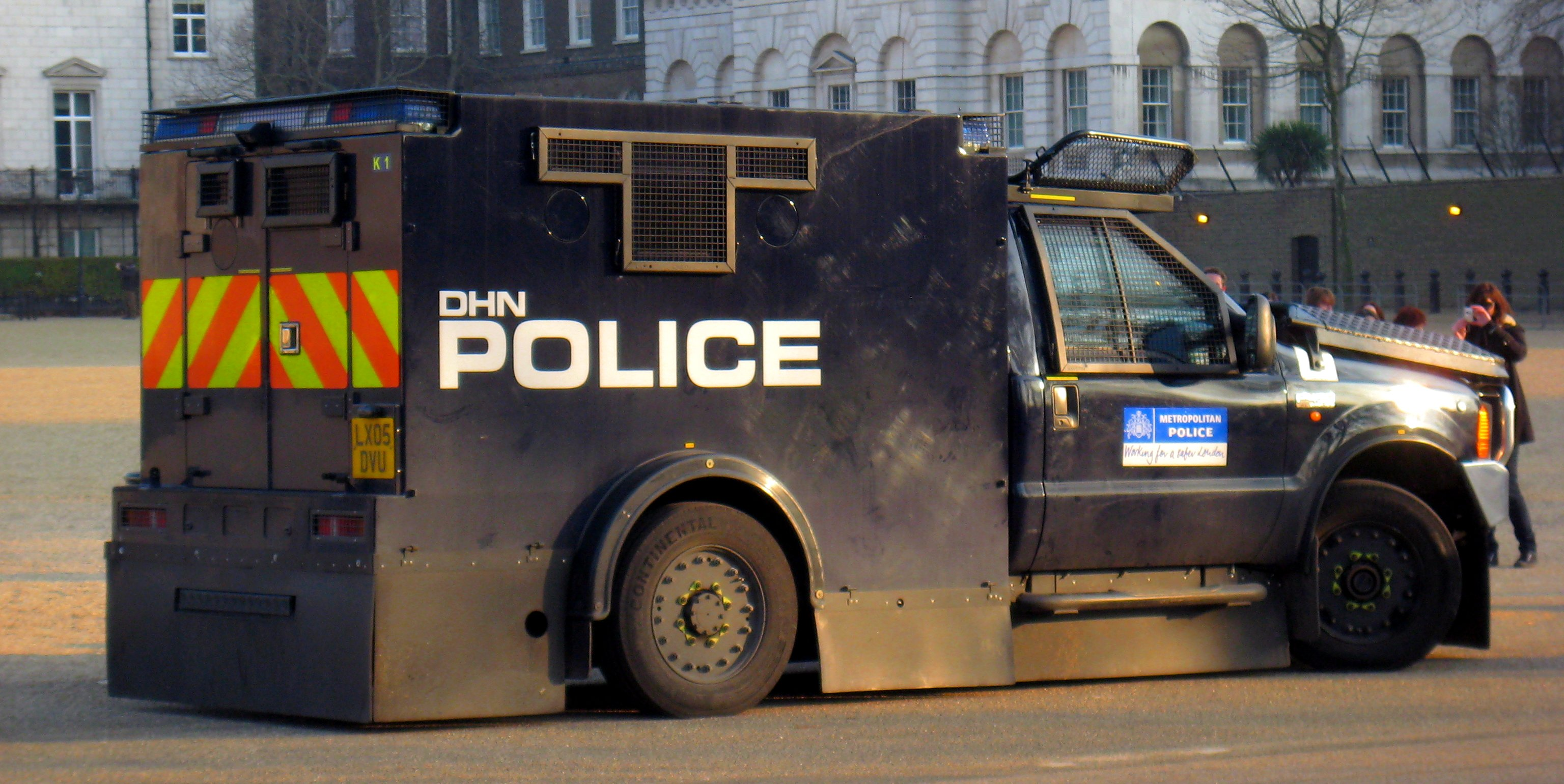
Jankel has supplied a quantity of Ford-based Guardian counter-terror/anti-riot vehicles to the Met (shown) and Essex Police forces.

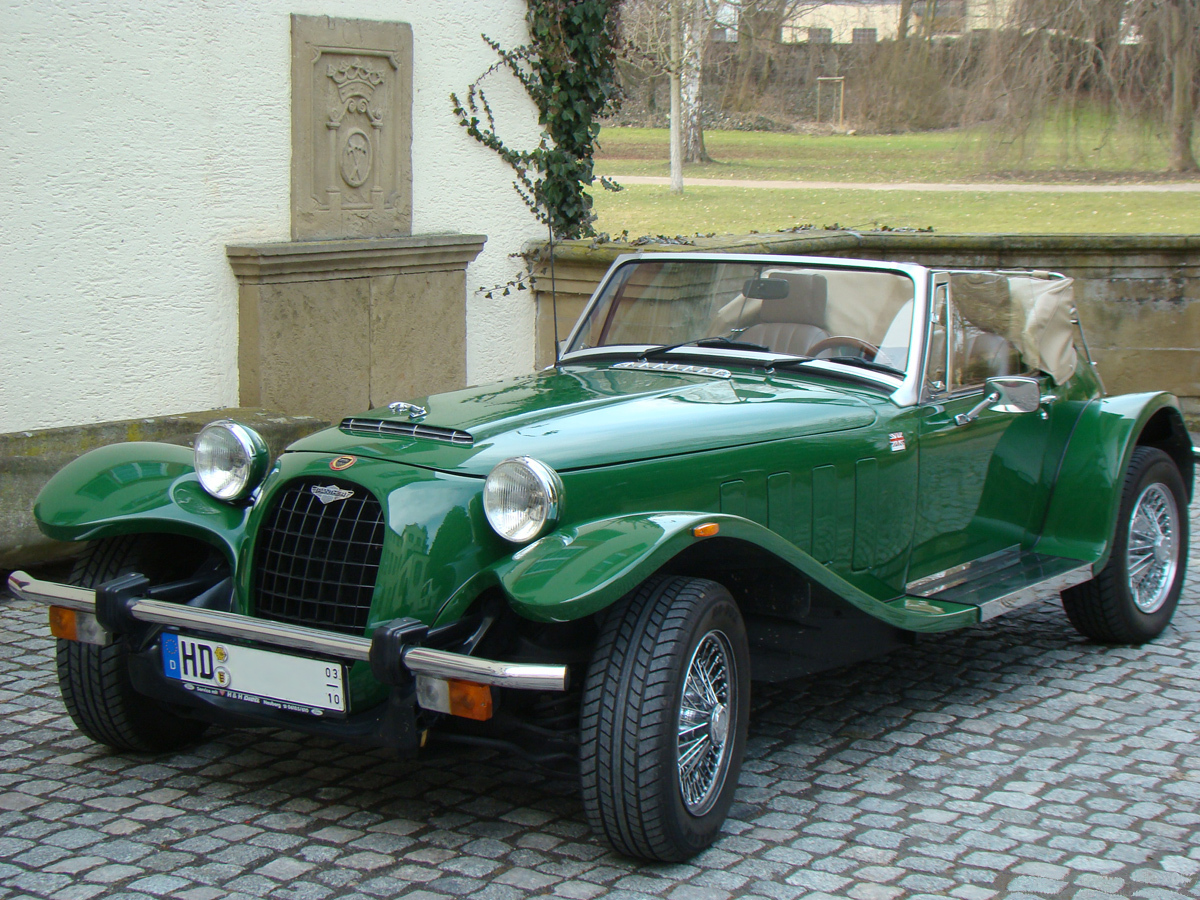
Jankel's founder, Robert Jankel, also formed Panther Westwinds. Panther was a manufacturer of sports cars based on commercially available mechanical components from manufacturers such as Jaguar, Vauxhall and Ford.
