= Panther Lazer =

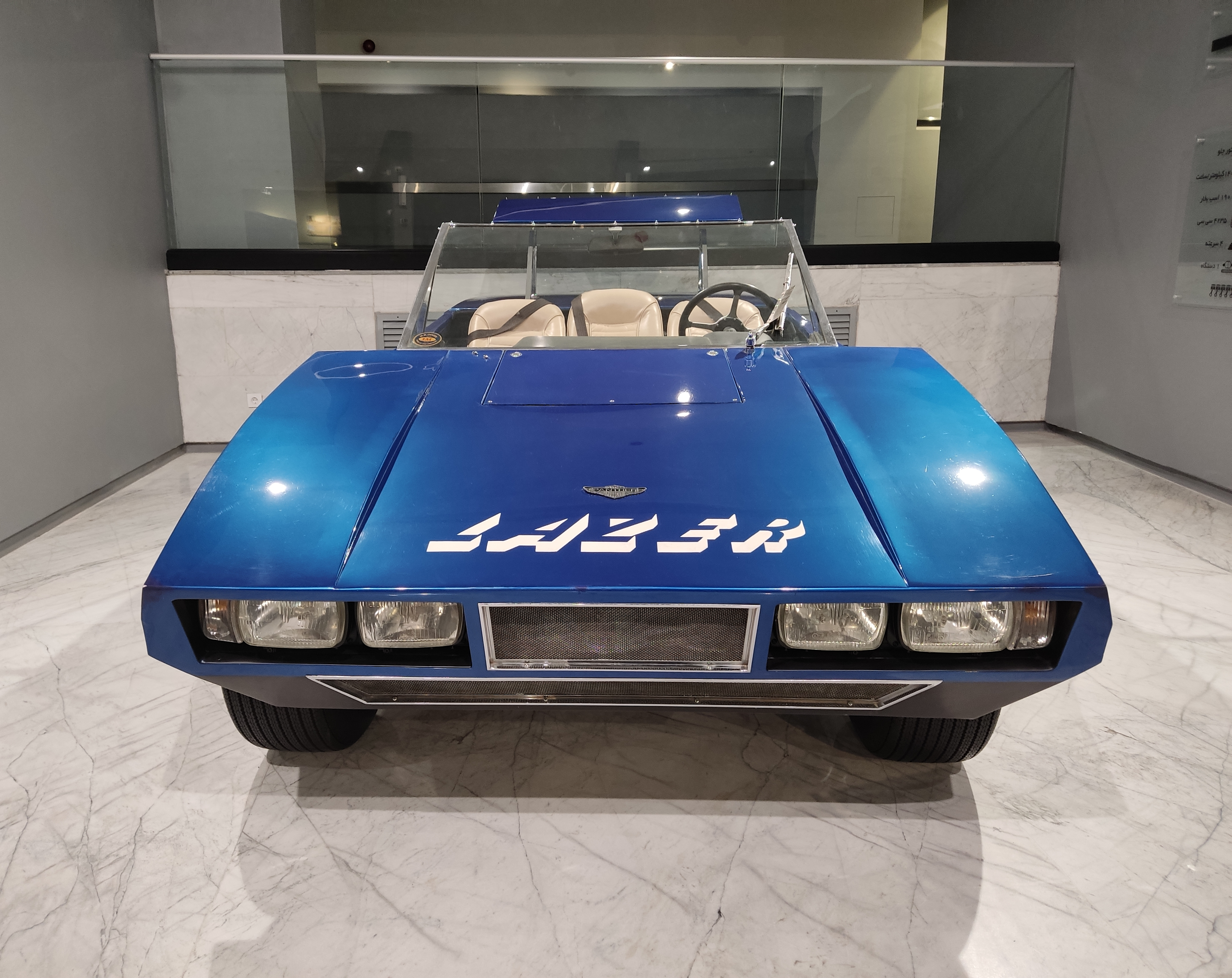

Overview
- Manufacturer: Panther Westwinds Ltd
- Production: 1974; 1 produced
- Assembly: United Kingdom: Weybridge, England
- Designer: Robert Jankel

Body and chassis
- Body style: 2-door roadster
- Layout: FR layout

Powertrain
- Engine: 5.3L Jaguar V12
- Transmission: 4-speed manual

The Panther Lazer was an open roadster sports car produced by the UK's Panther Westwinds company in 1974. Only one was ever sold. The Canadian importer for Panther wanted Robert Jankel to build a unique automobile as a surprise present for his wife. The car was to take its engine, manual gearbox, independent suspension and braking system from the Jaguar XJ12, although somewhere along the way, a 4.2-litre 6-cylinder engine was substituted for the V12, along with a J72-sourced rear axle. It was an odd 3-seat vehicle with a contemporary grand tourer body.

The car's wedgy aluminium bodywork housed a three-abreast passenger compartment, with centrally mounted instruments being housed in a prominent binnacle that was angled towards the driver. The OTT rear wing gave the car something of a "Wacky Races" appearance, although in overall terms, the car's design was quite respectable, featuring energy absorbing bodywork with box-section crumple zones.

Although a visionary example of automotive design, the woman for whom it had been built rejected this gift from her husband. Delivered in August 1974, the car was promptly returned to Panther's UK premises, where it languished for a couple of years before being sold to the Crown Prince of Iran, Reza Pahlavi, as he was still a teenager. It is now located at the National Car Museum of Iran.
