= Panther FF =

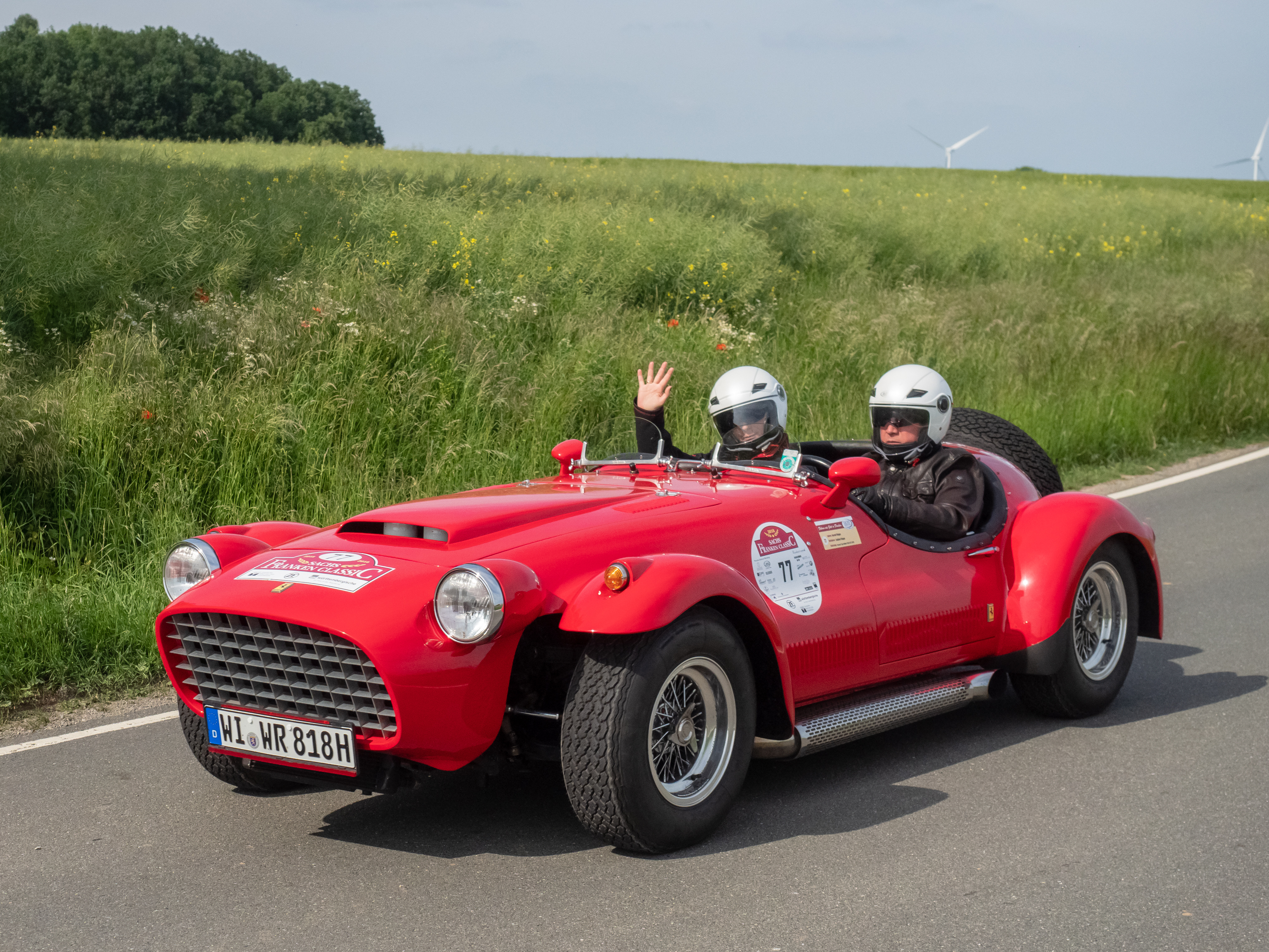

Overview
- Manufacturer: Panther Westwinds Ltd
- Production: 1974–1975; 7 produced
- Assembly: United Kingdom: Weybridge, England
- Designer: Robert Jankel

Body and chassis
- Body style: 2-door roadster
- Layout: FR layout

Powertrain
- Engine: 4.0 L Ferrari Colombo V12

Dimensions
- Wheelbase: 94.5 in (2,400 mm)
- Length: 160.0 in (4,064 mm)
- Width: 68.0 in (1,727 mm)
- Height: 48.0 in (1,219 mm)

The Panther FF (Felber Ferrari) was a 2-door open roadster sports car produced by Panther Westwinds in 1974 and 1975. The car was powered by a 4.0 L (3967 cc) Ferrari Colombo V12 engine for which an output of 300 bhp was claimed.

The body was made of hand beaten aluminum and the upholstery was made of real leather.
