= Panther Solo =

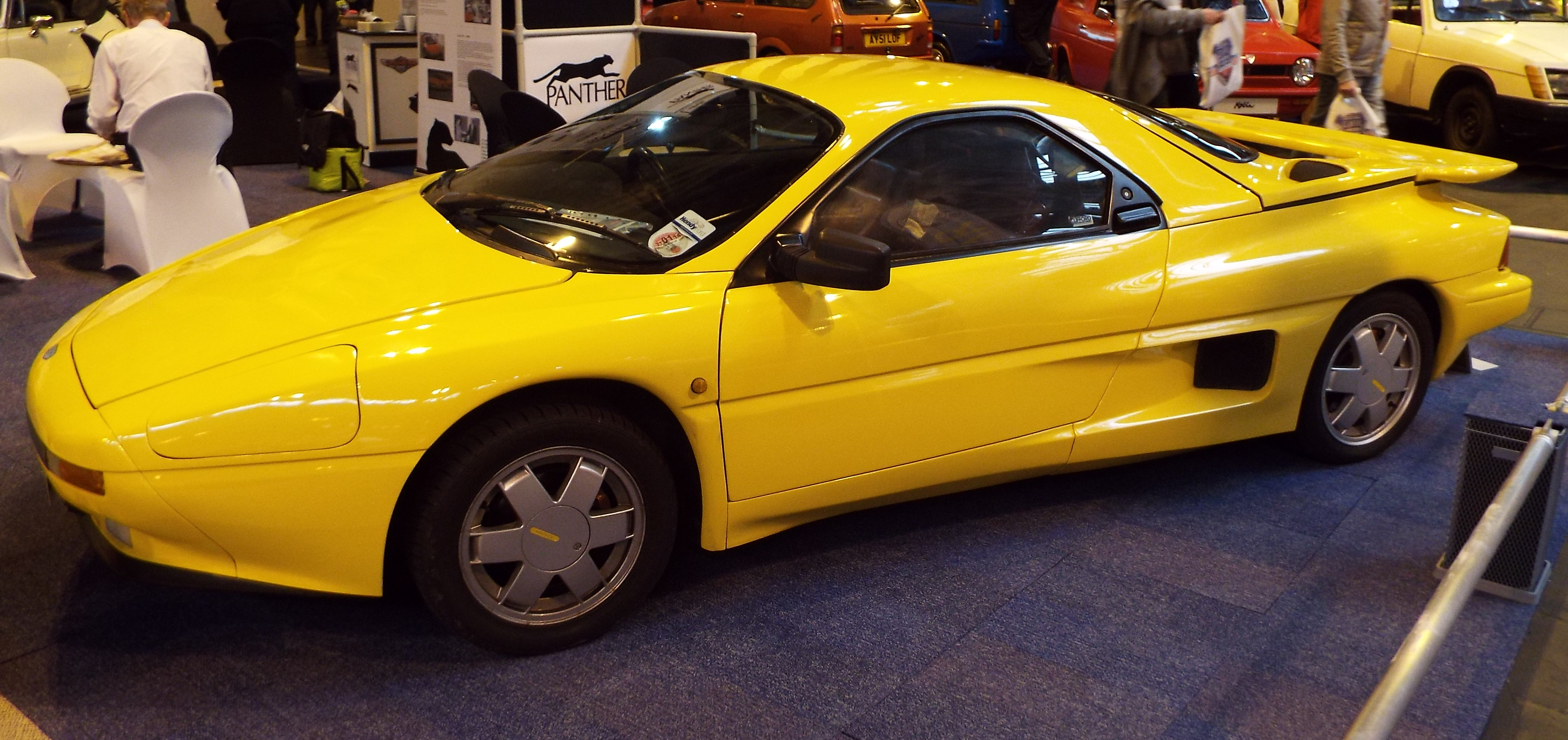
- Panther Solo 2

Overview
- Manufacturer: Panther Car Company
- Production: 1989–1990 between 13 and 20 produced
- Assembly: United Kingdom: Harlow, Essex, England
- Designer: Ken Greenley

Body and chassis
- Class: Sports car
- Body style: 2-door coupé 2-door 2+2 coupé
- Layout: RMR layout / RM4 layout

Dimensions
- Wheelbase: 99.6 in (2,530 mm)
- Length: 171.0 in (4,343 mm)
- Width: 70.1 in (1,781 mm)
- Height: 46.5 in (1,181 mm)
- Curb weight: 2,954 lb (1,340 kg)

The Panther Solo is a mid-engined sports car that was made by the British company Panther Car Company.

It was available as a two-seat coupé, with the option of additional rear seats to make it a 2+2. SsangYong Motor Company, which had become the owner of Panther Westwinds, made a concept car called the SsangYong Solo as a tribute to the original Solo and Solo 2, as well as a racing version called the SsangYong Solo Le Mans, a retooled WR LM94.

== Solo 1 ==
The first Solo, the Solo 1, was a mid-engined rear wheel drive car, powered by a Ford 1.6 CVH engine producing 105 hp (78 kW) (as fitted in the Ford Fiesta XR2), and designed as a replacement for the marque's volume model, the Panther Kallista. The car used relatively simple technology, had contemporary styling and was manufactured with a fibreglass body to reduce its weight.

While the Solo 1 was in development, Toyota launched its second-generation MR2. During a vacation in Guam, the South Korean owner of Panther, Y. C. Kim, test-drove an early MR2. After driving it, he concluded that the Solo 1 would be unable to compete with its rival and thus decided to have the car redesigned. He later explained "I drove the car, and straight after I rang up and told them to stop Project Solo". A new styling design for the Solo was created by Ken Greenley of the London RCA vehicle styling school. The restyled car featured a slightly larger 2+2 layout with a composite upper body, permanent four wheel drive and a mid-mounted engine from a Ford Sierra Cosworth. This would be called the "Solo 2". The body engineering designers involved were Martin Freestone (composites), Keith Hunter (underbody and structure) and William "Bill" Davis (engineering).

== Solo 2 ==
The Solo 2 used the 1,993 cc (121.6 cu in) turbocharged engine from the Ford Sierra RS Cosworth producing 204 hp (152 kW) at 6000 rpm and 200 lb⋅ft (271 N⋅m) of torque at 4500 rpm, around twice the horsepower of the Solo 1. It was mated to a Borg-Warner T-5 5-speed manual transmission (same as in the RS), which drove a Ferguson four-wheel drive system modified by Panther to use XR4x4 components, including both differentials. The company decided also to stretch the wheelbase to accommodate 2+2 seating, which was partly done by ex-Ford Europe engineers who had worked on the Sierra Cosworth and XR4x4. March did the aerodynamics, producing a C_{d} of 0.33, as well as producing the composite construction, encouraged by March chairman Robin Herd. One of the development cars had a twin turbo setup due to the known turbo lag issues.

A troublesome area was with the 4 wheel drive transfer box. This was a custom made part, the internals were chain-driven and the chains had a propensity for self-destruction under heavy engine load.

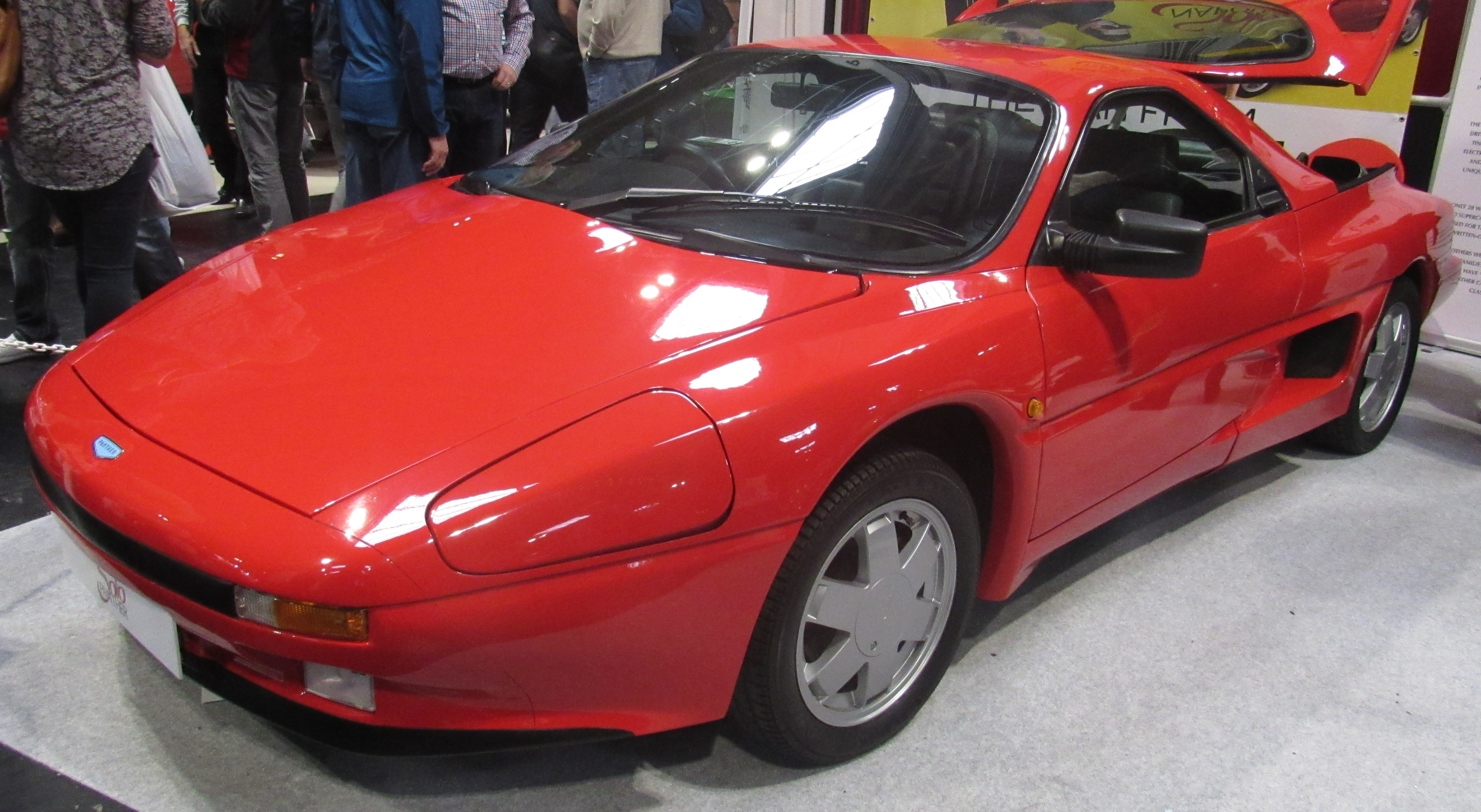
1990 Panther Solo 2 2.0

The lower body of the Solo 2 was a space frame made primarily of steel with the upper body being made from aluminium honeycomb sandwiched between multiple sheets of impregnated glass fibre bonded with epoxy. The upper body was to be glued using an aerospace adhesive to the lower chassis. No rollbar was needed. The suspension used Escort struts in front, while the disc brakes were fitted with Scorpio-derived ABS.

It is not known exactly how many vehicles were built, though 12 were reported to have been sold to customers. Three Solos were unsold; two were destroyed and one is still owned by the owner of Panther. One vehicle was written off by a motoring journalist who walked away unhurt from the wreckage.

As of 2020, 11 examples survive in the UK, with all but one listed as SORN (Statutory Off Road Notification, to legally notify the government that the vehicle will not be driven on public roads).

== Solo 3 ==
Following the disappointment sales failure of the Solo 2, the then new owners Ssangyong displayed a Solo 3 concept at the 1995 Seoul Motor Show. Fitted with a 3.2-litre six-cylinder engine with a reported 220bhp it was a showcase for what the company could do rather than an aim for a production car, and it remained a concept.

== Cars ==
Chassis Number	Colour	Owner	Country	Registration Number
012	Blue	-	South Korea	F59SWC
013	Crash test vehicle			
014	Red	Y C Kim, passed on to his son	South Korea	G846 WEV
015	Silver	Andie Wills	United Kingdom	D15 OLO (formerly G521 FNO)
016	Red	-	South Korea	-
017	Red	Scott McDonagh	-	-
018	Red	Stephen Allan Vine	United Kingdom	G308 XAR (formerly SPC 21)
019	Metallic Red	Bruno Eismark	United Kingdom	G307XAR (formerly RT 40)
020	No car produced			
021	No car produced			
022	Metallic Blue	Jamie MacRae	-	G99 EDA
023	Red	"Athan Athanasiou"	United Kingdom	H736 HEV
024	Metallic Green	David Carter	United Kingdom	H732 HEV
025	Yellow	-	Japan	G559VYW
026	Red	Justin Ross	United States of America	D5 OLO (formerly H731 HEV)
027	Metallic Silver	Robin Tracy	United Kingdom	BNZ 5010 (formerly 11 JKP)
028	Green	Kenny Rogers	Spain	H733 HEV
029	Red	-	California, USA	-
030	Metallic Red	J Wootton	United Kingdom	H75 OLO
031	Red	George Forrest	-	H734 HEV
032	Grey	-	South Korea	-

== Sources and further reading ==
- Hutton, Ray (January 1988). Sherman, Don (ed.). "Preview: Panther Solo 2". Car and Driver. 33 (7). Ann Arbor, MI USA: Diamandis Communications: 125–128. ISSN 0008-6002.
