= Panther 6 =

Overview
- Manufacturer: Panther Westwinds Ltd
- Production: 1977–1978; 2 produced
- Assembly: United Kingdom: Weybridge, England
- Designer: Robert Jankel

Body and chassis
- Body style: 2-door convertible
- Layout: RMR layout

Powertrain
- Engine: 8.2 L (500 cu in) Cadillac V8
- Transmission: 3-speed automatic

Dimensions
- Wheelbase: 105.0 in (2,667 mm)
- Length: 192.0 in (4,877 mm)
- Width: 80.0 in (2,032 mm)
- Height: 48.0 in (1,219 mm)
- Curb weight: 2,870 lb (1,302 kg)

The Panther 6 was a British six-wheel convertible produced by Panther in 1977.

== Description and history ==
The car is powered by a mid-mounted 8.2 L (500 cu in) Cadillac V8 engine with twin turbochargers paired to a three-speed automatic transmission. Only two cars were made (one in white, one in black), both of which are known still to exist. One is in Saudi Arabia, and the other was shown at the 2008 NEC Classic Car Show by the Panther Car Club and at the 2015 Concorso d'Eleganza Villa d'Este by Albert Fellner. Its list price was $96,000.

The six-wheel configuration was inspired by the Tyrrell P34 Formula 1 racing car. The layout consists of one pair of larger rear wheels with Pirelli 265/50VR16 tyres, and two pairs of smaller steerable front wheels with Pirelli 205/40VR13 tyres.

The specification included a detachable hard top and convertible soft top, electronic instruments, a 17,000 BTU air conditioner, an automatic fire extinguisher, electric seats and windows, a telephone and a dashboard-mounted television set.

Claims for the top speed of this vehicle suggested it was capable of over 200 mph (322 km/h). At least one of the two vehicles "was the showstopper of London's 1977 Motorfair...". The black vehicle appeared at the Auto Expo show in Manhattan, New York City, in the spring of 1978.

== See also ==
- Covini C6W
- FAB 1 (fictional car)
- Ford Seattle-ite XXI (concept car)
- Tyrrell P34
