= Ford Seattle-ite XXI =

1962 concept car

The Ford Seattle-ite XXI was a 3/8 scale concept car designed by Alex Tremulis and displayed on 20 April 1962 on the Ford stand at the Seattle World's Fair.

== Description ==
The car contained novel ideas that have since become reality: interchangeable fuel cell power units; interchangeable bodies; interactive computer navigation, mapping, and auto information systems; and four driving and steering wheels. The concept of some form of compact nuclear propulsion device was included as a possible power source on the assumption that radiation issues could be overcome without the need for prohibitively bulky shielding.

The car had six wheels, with four steerable ones at the front and two fixed ones at the rear – similar to the later fictional six-wheel 1965 FAB1 and the real Tyrrell P34 racing car of the mid-1970s. The designers determined the six-wheel concept would enhance tracking, traction, and braking. It had an interchangeable front-powered section that enabled the car to be turned into either an economical city runabout or, when needed, a powerful transcontinental cruiser. All control mechanisms were through flexible couplings. Steering was by way of a fingertip-controlled dial.

== See also ==
- Covini C6W
- FAB 1 (fictional car)
- Panther 6
- Tyrrell P34
