= Joe Loss =

British bandleader (1909–1990)

Joe Loss LVO OBE
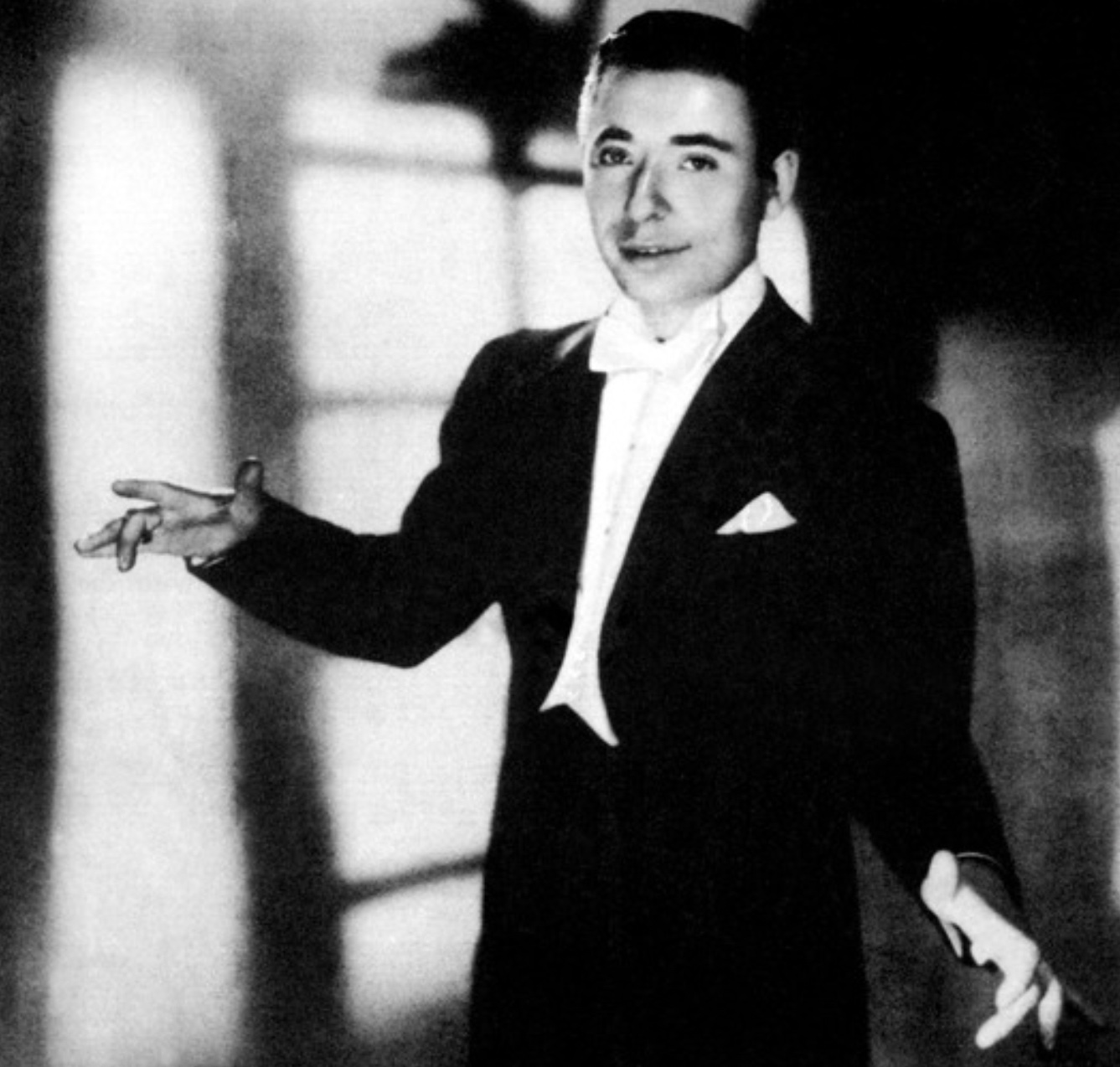
- Joe Loss in 1936

Background information
- Born: Joshua Zalig Loss; 22 June 1909; Spitalfields, London, England
- Died: 6 June 1990 (aged 80) Westminster, London, England
- Genres: Swing music, big band
- Occupations: Bandleader; musician; arranger; composer
- Instrument: Violin
- Years active: 1919–1990
- Labels: Columbia Records, His Master's Voice, Regal Zonophone

Joshua Alexander Loss (born Joshua Zalig Loss; 22 June 1909 – 6 June 1990) was a British dance band leader and musician who founded his own eponymous orchestra.

== Life ==
Loss was born in Spitalfields, London, the youngest of four children. His parents, Israel and Ada Loss, were Russian Jews and first cousins. His father was a cabinet-maker who had an office furnishing business. Loss attended the Jews' Free School, Trinity College of Music and the London College of Music (now part of the University of West London). He started violin lessons at the age of seven and later played violin at the Tower Ballroom, Blackpool and also with Oscar Rabin.

Loss started band leading in the early 1930s, working at the Astoria Ballroom and soon breaking into variety at the Kit-Cat Club. In 1934, he topped the bill at the Holborn Empire but in the same year moved back to the Astoria Ballroom, where he led a twelve-piece band. In 1935, Vera Lynn appeared with the Joe Loss Orchestra in her first radio broadcast. With broadcasting, recording and annual tours in addition to the resident work the band became highly popular over the next few years. In the 1950s and early 60s, Loss was resident band leader at the Hammersmith Palais and was remembered by a trainee nurse at Hammersmith Hospital as being as kind and gentlemanly when she attended him in hospital as he was in his public persona. His band's signature tune "In the Mood" would often be requested three or more times a night.

He was the subject of This Is Your Life on two occasions: in May 1963 when he was surprised by Eamonn Andrews at the Hammersmith Palais in London, and again in October 1980, when Andrews surprised him at London's Portman Hotel during a star-studded party to celebrate Loss' 50 years in show business. A favourite of the British royal family, Loss' orchestra performed not only at Royal Variety Performances but also at Christmas parties hosted by the royal family, which earned Loss not only the OBE but also the LVO, an honour in the personal gift of the Queen.

Loss' daughter Jennifer is chair of the Jewish Music Institute in London and was married to the British car designer Robert Jankel.

Loss died on 6 June 1990 and is buried at Bushey Jewish Cemetery in Hertfordshire.

== Joe Loss Orchestra ==
The Joe Loss Orchestra was one of the most successful acts of the big band era in the 1940s, with hits including "In the Mood". In 1961, they had a hit with "Wheels—Cha Cha", a version of the String-A-Longs' hit "Wheels". Other hits included David Rose's "The Stripper" in 1958, "Sucu Sucu", "Must Be Madison", "The Theme from Maigret" and "March of the Mods (The Finnjenka Dance)" of 1964.

In April 1951, Elizabeth Batey, vocalist with Joe Loss, fell and broke her jaw. Joe was badly in need of a replacement and remembered hearing Rose Brennan on radio during a visit to Ireland. Within days, he had located her and, before a week was out, she was in Manchester rehearsing with the band. She stayed with Loss for fifteen years, before giving up show-business in the mid-1960s. She wrote many of the songs she recorded with Joe Loss under the name Marella, and co-wrote songs with John Harris. Her co-vocalists with the orchestra from 1955 were Ross MacManus (father of Elvis Costello) and Larry Gretton.

The Joe Loss Orchestra carries on under the musical direction of Todd Miller, who was a vocalist with the band for 19 years before Loss' death. In 1989, Joe Loss became too ill to travel and in 1990 he entrusted the leadership to his longest serving band member, trombonist and player-manager of many decades, Sam Watmough, and Miller. The orchestra has been in constant operation since 1930 and in 2015 it celebrated its 85th anniversary.

Specialist dance band radio stations continue to play his records. Joe Loss also features regularly on the Manx Radio programme Sweet & Swing, presented by Howard Caine.

== Honors and recognition ==
Loss was appointed Officer of the Order of the British Empire (OBE) in the 1978 Birthday Honours, and Lieutenant of the Royal Victorian Order (LVO) in the 1984 New Year Honours.
