= Janklow =

Janklow is a surname derived from the Polish Jewish given name Jankiel. Notable people with the surname include:

- Bill Janklow (1939–2012), American lawyer and politician
- Morton L. Janklow (1930–2022), American literary agent
