= Panther De Ville =

Neo-classic luxury vehicle

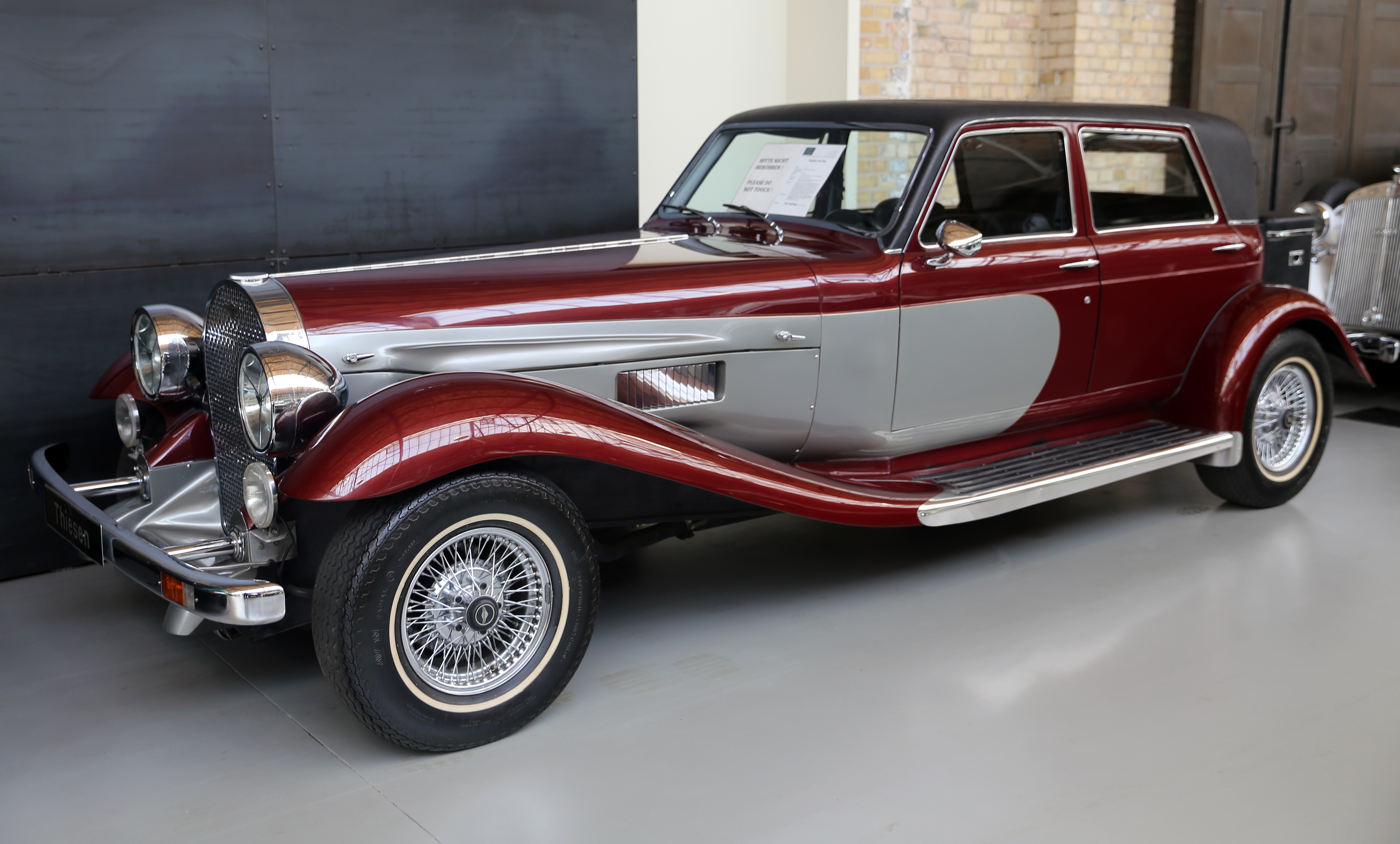

Overview
- Manufacturer: Panther Westwinds Ltd
- Production: 1974–1985; 60 produced
- Assembly: United Kingdom: Weybridge, England
- Designer: Robert Jankel

Body and chassis
- Body style: 4-door saloon; 2-door coupé; 2-door convertible; 6-door limousine
- Layout: FR layout

Powertrain
- Engine: 4.2 L Jaguar XK6 I6; 5.3 L Jaguar V12
- Transmission: 3-speed automatic (1974–1976); 4-speed automatic (1977–1985)

Dimensions
- Wheelbase: 142.0 in (3,607 mm)
- Length: 204.0 in (5,182 mm)
- Width: 71.0 in (1,803 mm)
- Height: 61.0 in (1,549 mm)
- Curb weight: 4,370 lb (1,982 kg)

The Panther De Ville is a neo-classic luxury vehicle which was produced by Panther Westwinds, a British speciality car maker, from 1974 to 1985. The De Ville was conceived by Robert Jankel to appeal to the taste of nouveau riche customers, including singer Elton John and actor Oliver Reed. About 60 De Villes were hand-built, including eleven two-door convertibles (for many years Britain's most expensive listed production car), and one pink and gold six-door limousine.

With a wheelbase of 142 inches (3,607 mm), the tubular-framed De Ville used a straight-six engine or a V12 engine from Jaguar Cars. The flowing wing lines and big headlights of the De Ville were styled to imitate the Bugatti Royale. The interior of the De Ville was modern, without the exterior's pretense of pre-war styling.

The Panther De Ville was equipped with Jaguar suspension, power steering and an automatic transmission, so it was an easy car to drive and quite quick, although poor aerodynamics tended to keep the top speed low. The interiors were lavish and often featured TV sets and drinks bars. The doors of the De Ville were from the BMC 1800 family car.

A Panther De Ville was used in Disney's live-action movies 101 Dalmatians (1996), 102 Dalmatians (2000), and two De Villes for the film Cruella (2021) as Cruella de Vil's car. The Jaguar engine in the car was replaced with a small-block Chevrolet V8 to better withstand the rigours of stunt driving. The Panther de Ville was hand painted by Alexander Mitchell.

== Gallery ==
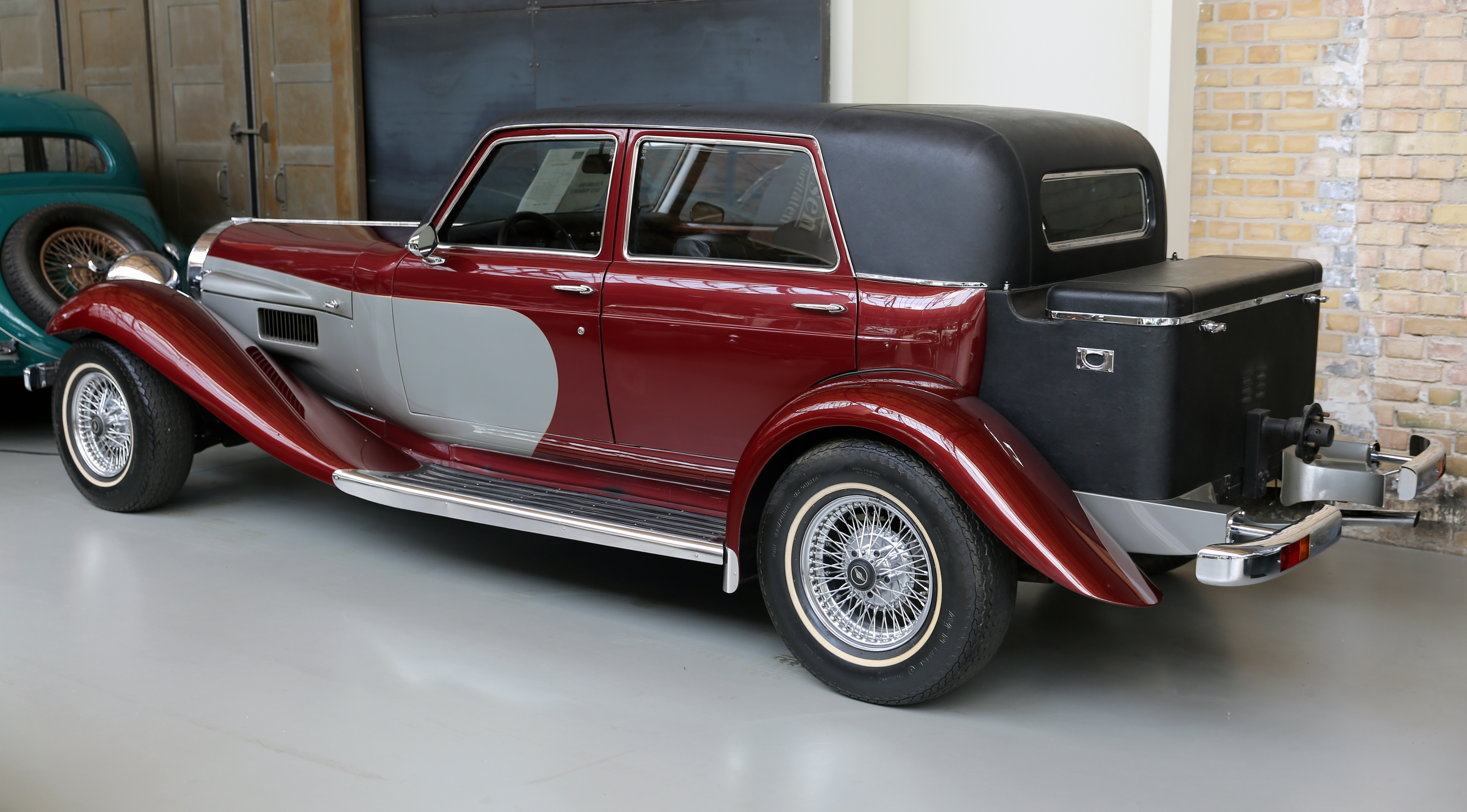
1978 Panther De Ville Saloon rear

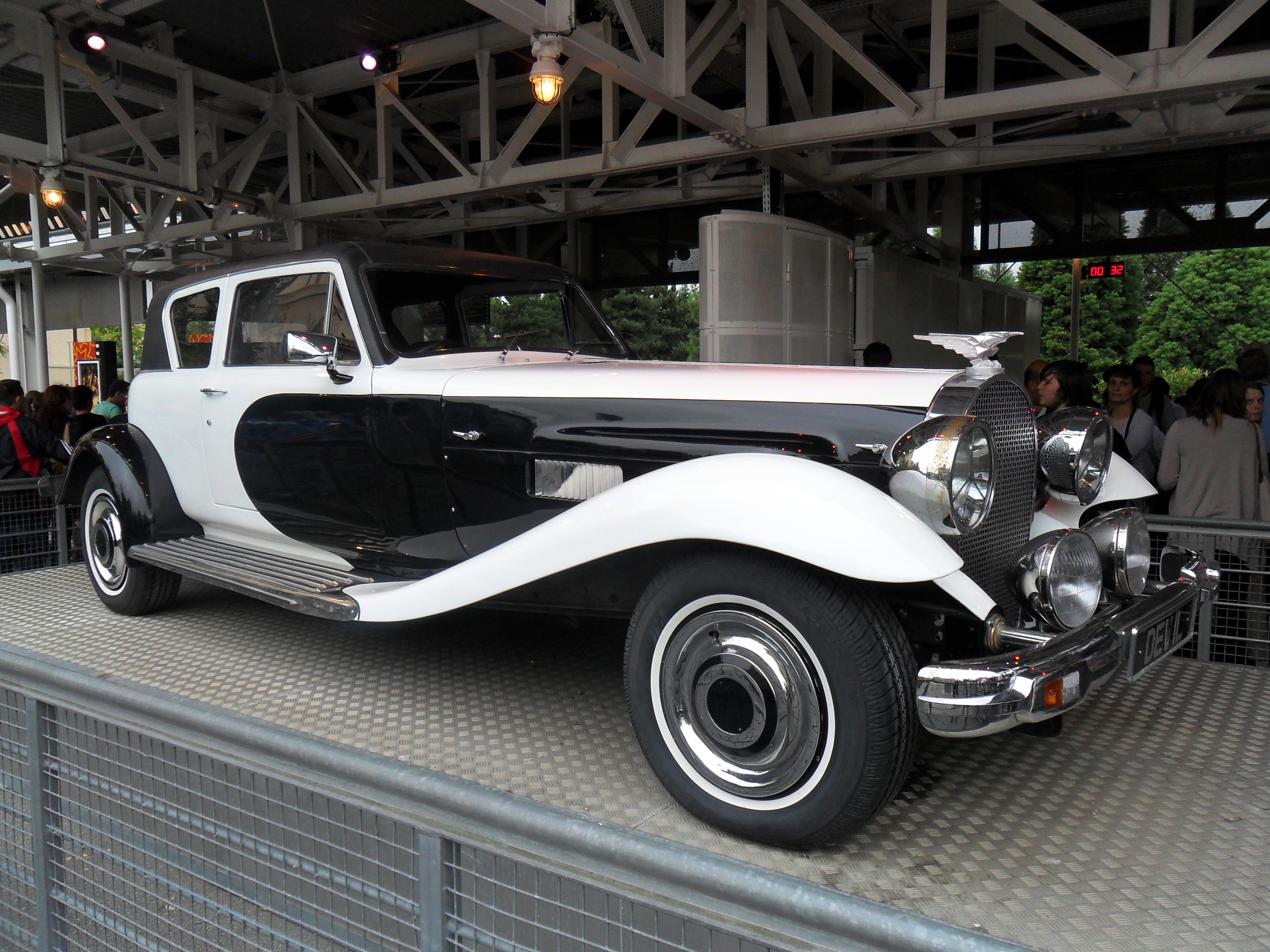
The customized Panther De Ville driven by Cruella De Vil in the 1996 and 2000 films
