= Yankelevich =

Yankelevich is a Russian-language patronymic surname derived from the Yiddish given name Yankel. Polish-language version is Jankieliewicz.

- Jaime Yankelevich
- Omer Yankelevich
- Romina Yankelevich
- Tomás Yankelevich
- Yuri Yankelevich

== Other transcriptions ==
- Idel Ianchelevici (1909 – 1994), Russian Empire-born Romanian and Belgian sculptor and draughtsman
- Leon Jankielewicz (born 1950), Polish communist activist in Lithuanian SSR, MP
- Vladimir Jankélévitch (1903-1985), French philosopher and musicologist
