= Panther Rio =

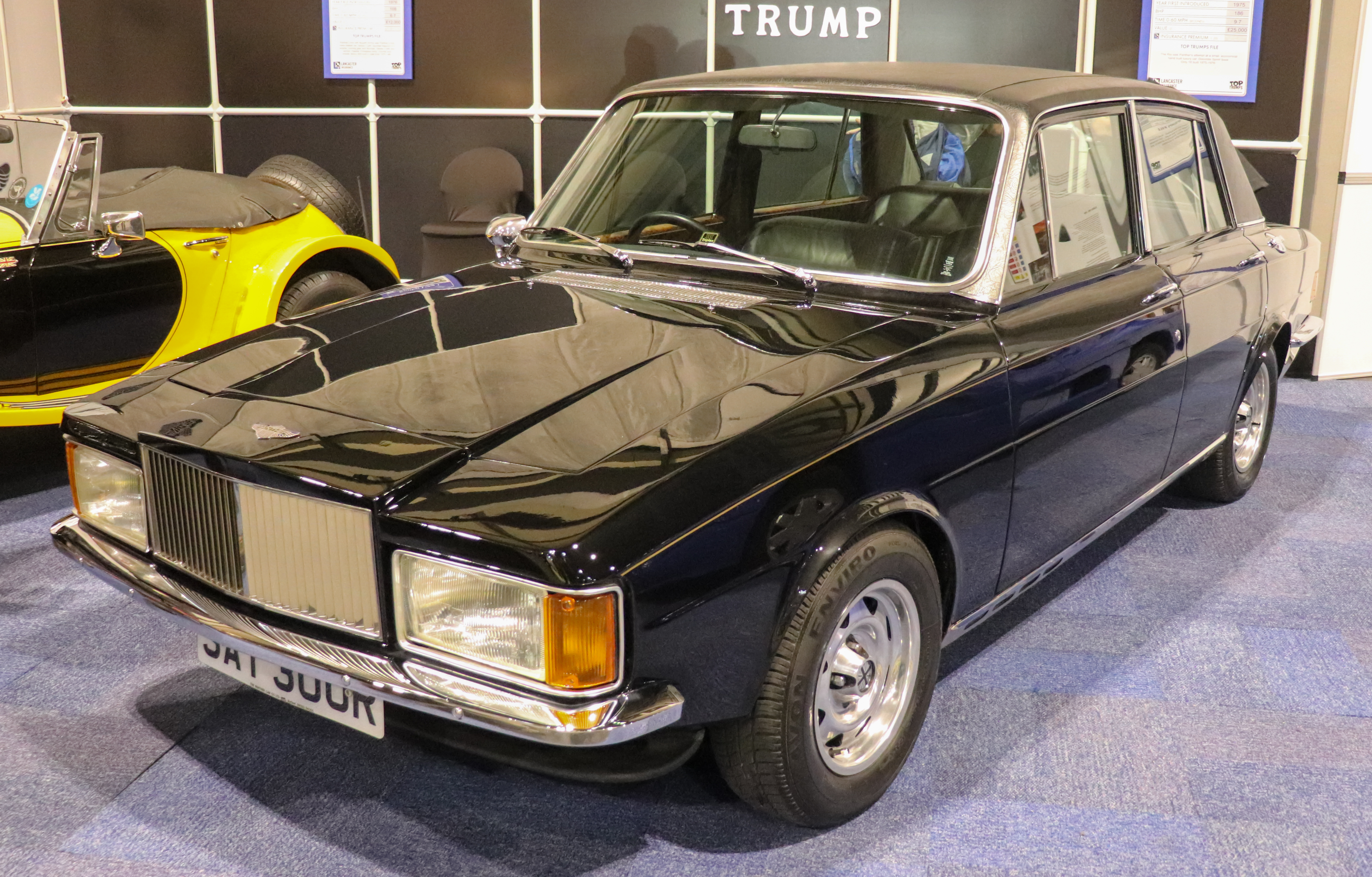
- 1977 Panther Rio 2.0

Overview
- Manufacturer: Panther Westwinds Ltd
- Production: 1975–1977; 38 produced
- Assembly: United Kingdom: Weybridge, England
- Designer: Robert Jankel

Body and chassis
- Body style: 4-door saloon
- Layout: FR layout

The Panther Rio is a saloon car made by British manufacturer Panther Westwinds, based on the Triumph Dolomite. According to the company, it differed from the family saloon-class Dolomite, in being finished to "Rolls-Royce standards". Only 38 were built between 1975 and 1977, including the rarer Rio Especial variant, which was based on the high-performance Triumph Dolomite Sprint.

== Background and concept ==
Fashion designer Robert Jankel founded Panther Westwinds to produce expensive and bespoke cars for the customer that wanted something entirely different. Such vehicles held a lucrative market at the time. Jankel began working on a car that would appeal to the Rolls-Royce owner looking to downsize to a more economical option without compromising on luxury or craftsmanship. Following the 1973 energy crisis, demand for cars with high fuel consumption began to diminish.

The Triumph Dolomite was chosen as the foundation for this concept due to its combination of advanced engine technology and traditional upright driving position. These features offered a balance of modern performance and classic appeal. The resulting car, named the Panther Rio, was launched in September 1975.

At launch, the car featured leather and walnut internal fittings, along with a hand-beaten aluminium skin. The Rio was advertised as:

"Combining characteristics combined in no other single car – the very highest level of luxury, appointments and smooth quietness with superb handling, a 115 mph (185 km/h) maximum speed, 0–60 mph acceleration in 8.7 seconds, the opulence of Connolly Leather, deep pile carpeting and burr walnut in the finest limousine traditions with the fuel economy and manoeuvrability of a compact family saloon; Panther coachbuilt quality and safety engineering with total functionalism; hand-crafted exclusivity without ostentation."

=== Variants ===
The Rio was offered in two variants: a standard 1850 cc model and the Rio Especial, which featured a 2.0-litre 16-valve engine from the Dolomite Sprint. However, the Rio faced criticism for its reduced interior space, due to thicker seating that compromised cabin room compared to the original Dolomite.

== Sales ==
Panther was optimistic about the Rio’s prospects and announced a pre-order of 100 units through H.R. Owen, a luxury line of dealerships. This would have meant a financial boon, clearing the way for the Rio to be offered for sale amongst some of the highest quality vehicles of the time. However, the order never materialized and sales remained sluggish, likely due to the high price and customer awareness of the car's Triumph Dolomite origins.

== Pricing ==
The Rio's high price was an obstacle. In February 1976, the Rio Especial retailed at £9,445, which was significantly more than the £3,283 Triumph Dolomite Sprint. The car was even pricier than the Jaguar XJ 5.3, which sold for £7,496 and was advertised with luxury to equal the Rio.
