= Panther J72 =

Panther J.72
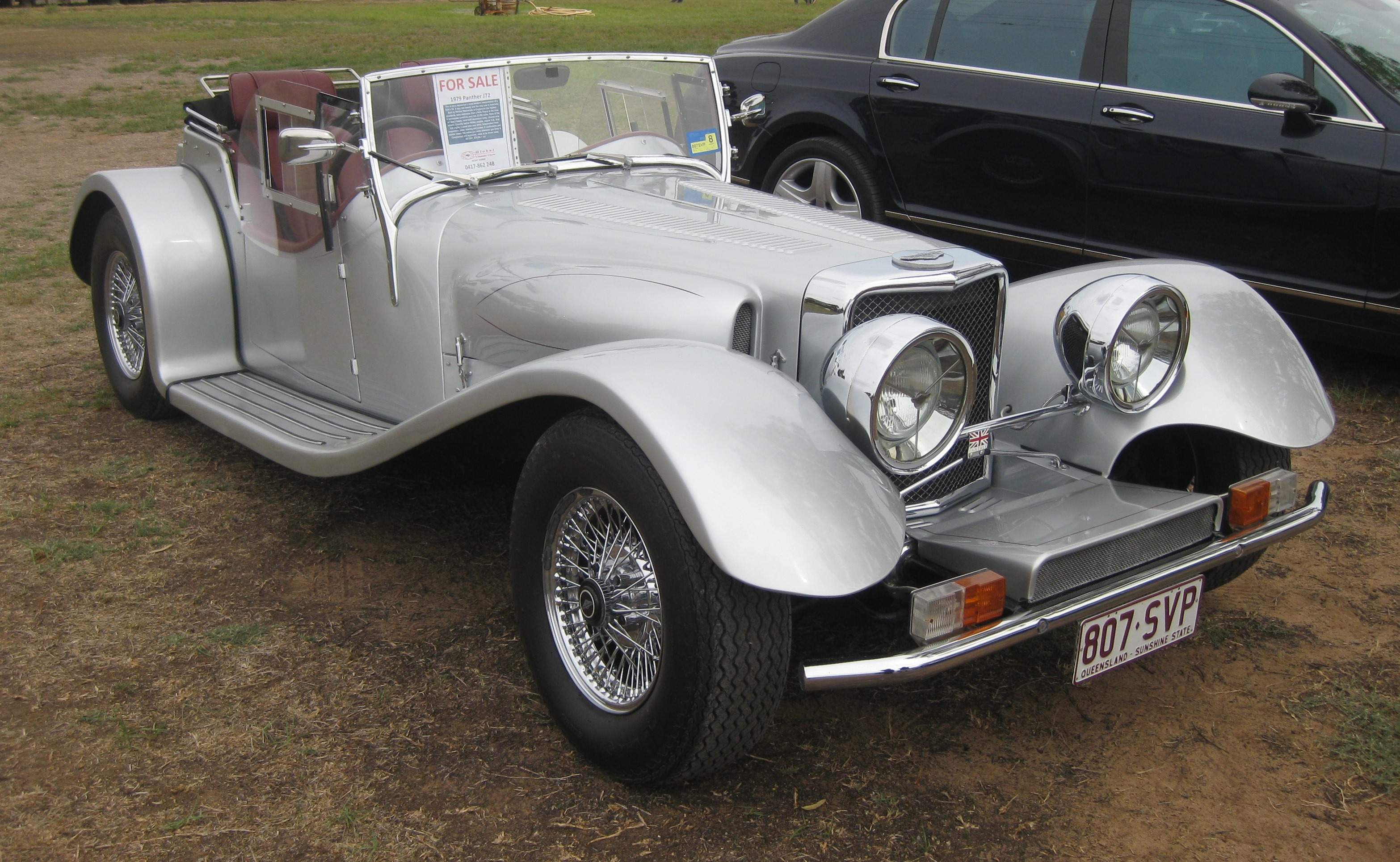
- 1972 Panther J.72

Overview
- Manufacturer: Panther Westwinds Ltd
- Production: 1972–1981; 368 produced
- Assembly: United Kingdom: Weybridge, England
- Designer: Robert Jankel

Body and chassis
- Body style: 2-door roadster
- Layout: FR layout

Powertrain
- Engine: 3.8L Jaguar XK6; 4.2L Jaguar XK6; 5.3L Jaguar V12
- Transmission: 4-speed manual 3-speed automatic

Dimensions
- Wheelbase: 109.1 in (2,771 mm)
- Length: 160.0 in (4,064 mm)
- Width: 65.5 in (1,664 mm)
- Height: 53.0 in (1,346 mm)
- Curb weight: 2,504 lb (1,136 kg)

Chronology
- Successor: Panther Brooklands

The Panther J72 was a luxury car which was sold from 1972 to 1981. The two-door roadster was the first production vehicle of the Panther Westwinds company. Styled to evoke the Jaguar SS100, it used mechanicals from the Jaguar XJ, including its 5.3 L (320 cu in) V12 engine. It was also offered with Jaguar's 3.8 L (230 cu in) and 4.2 L (260 cu in) XK inline sixes.

The J72 was a success for the small company, with its Connolly leather upholstery and aluminium coachwork. The car was purchased by a celebrity clientele, including comedian Redd Foxx, Freddy Mercury, and Elizabeth Taylor. A total of 368 were produced. The first units were assembled at Michael Walker's garage, Woking. The chassis was supplied by Geoff Jago near Chichester. The engines and gearboxes came from Forward Engineering, Coventry. The chassis was built up then sent away to have the body fitted, returned for engine fitting, then sent to the trimmers for the interior and hood. Final work and start-up was carried out at Michael Walkers, Woking, including test drives around the local country roads.

A custom-built J72 was ordered, using a V-12 engine. In 1973 it was shown at the Frankfurt Motor Show, and was popular; the V12 became a regular upgrade option, priced at £4,000.

On 26 May 1976, Robert Jankel wrote to the Office of Compliance, National Highway Traffic Safety Administration in the US to comply with Part 578 of the Defect Report procedure. Six vehicles had a defect with the fuel tank which, in the event of a crash, was at risk of being pierced by the rear body mounting bolts. If this happened fuel would spill out and could cause a fire. Panther Westwinds Ltd notified the dealers and the first purchasers of the defect and told them what modifications were needed to fix the problem.

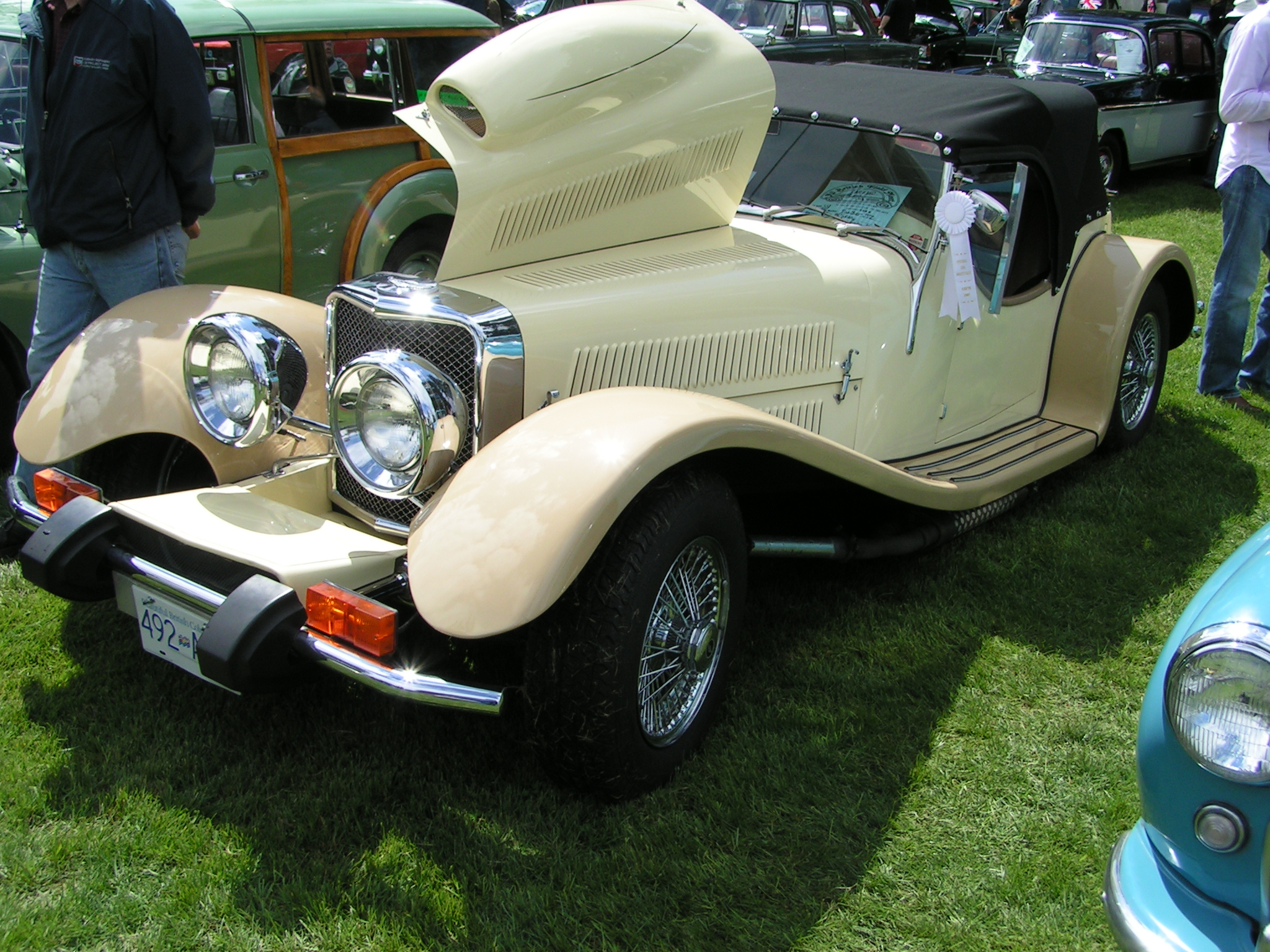
1976 Panther J72

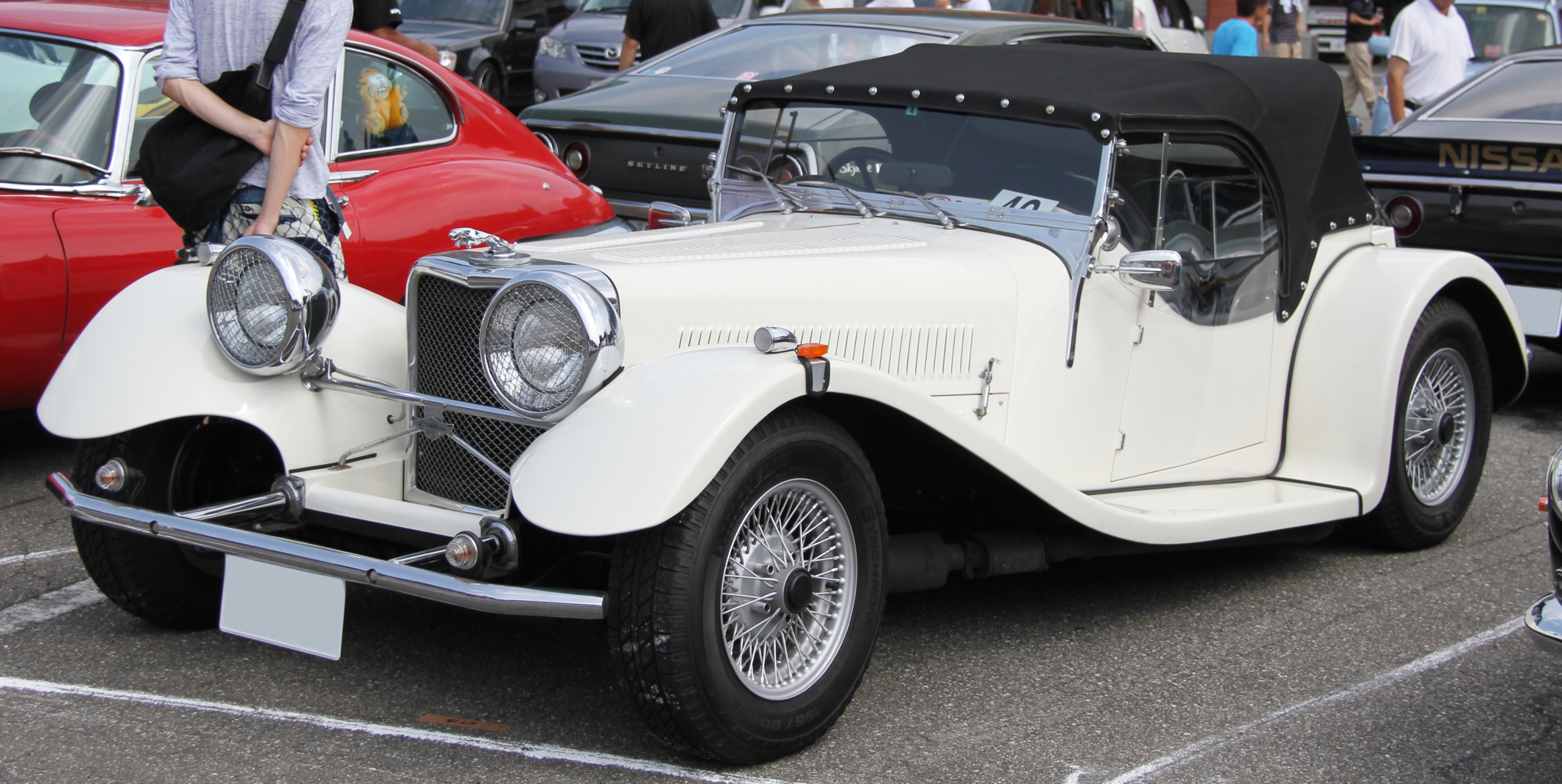
1980 Panther J72

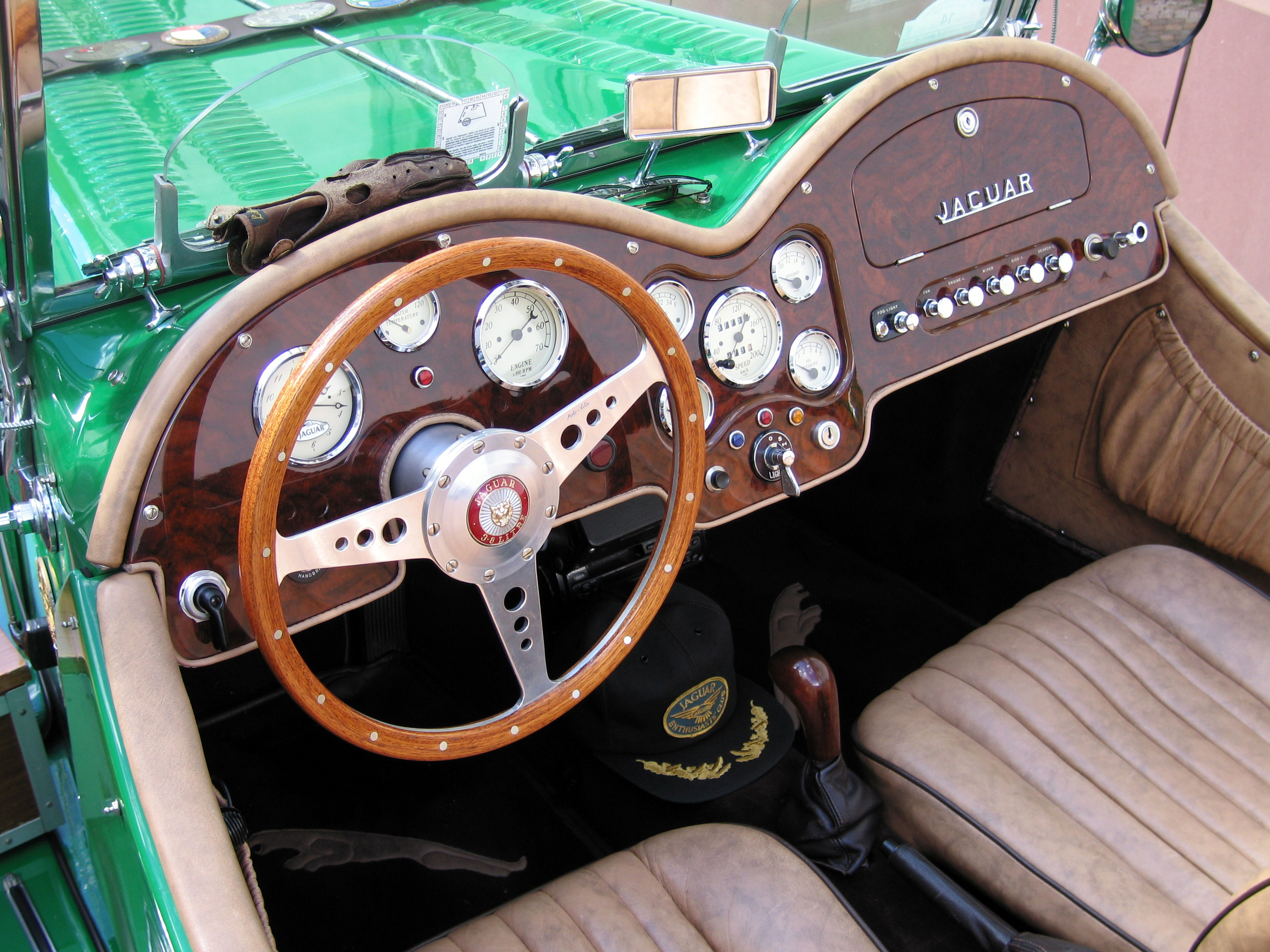
Panther J72 interior
