= Jewish Music Institute =

The Jewish Music Institute (JMI) is an arts organisation based at SOAS, the University of London's School of Oriental and African Studies. Its chair is Jennifer Jankel. It was previously known as the Jewish Music Heritage Trust and was refounded under its present name in 2000. JMI organises an annual free festival of klezmer music, Klezmer in the Park, in Regent's Park, London.

Chair and former CEO Jennifer Jankel stepped down in December 2024.
