= Yankel Zhuravitzer =

Yaakov Zechariah Maskalik, known publicly as Reb Yankel Zhuravitzer (1897–1938) was a rabbi and underground Chabad-Lubavitch activist in the Soviet Union in the early years of the Joseph Stalin regime. In defiance of the Soviet authorities, Maskalik compiled locations of usable mikvahs (ritual baths) across the Soviet Union and distributed them in little notes to Jewish women in marketplaces. In the early 1930s, he resided in the Moscow suburb of Malakhovka until his arrest in 1935.

Like many Chabad activists arrested by the authorities, he was deported to Central Asia, exiled to the village of Halkina, located 35 miles from the Kazakh city of Chimkent.

Maskalik was arrested by the NKVD in 1935 and executed in 1938. The exact date and location of his execution is not known.
