= Panther Westwinds =

Defunct English automobile manufacturer

Panther Westwinds logo

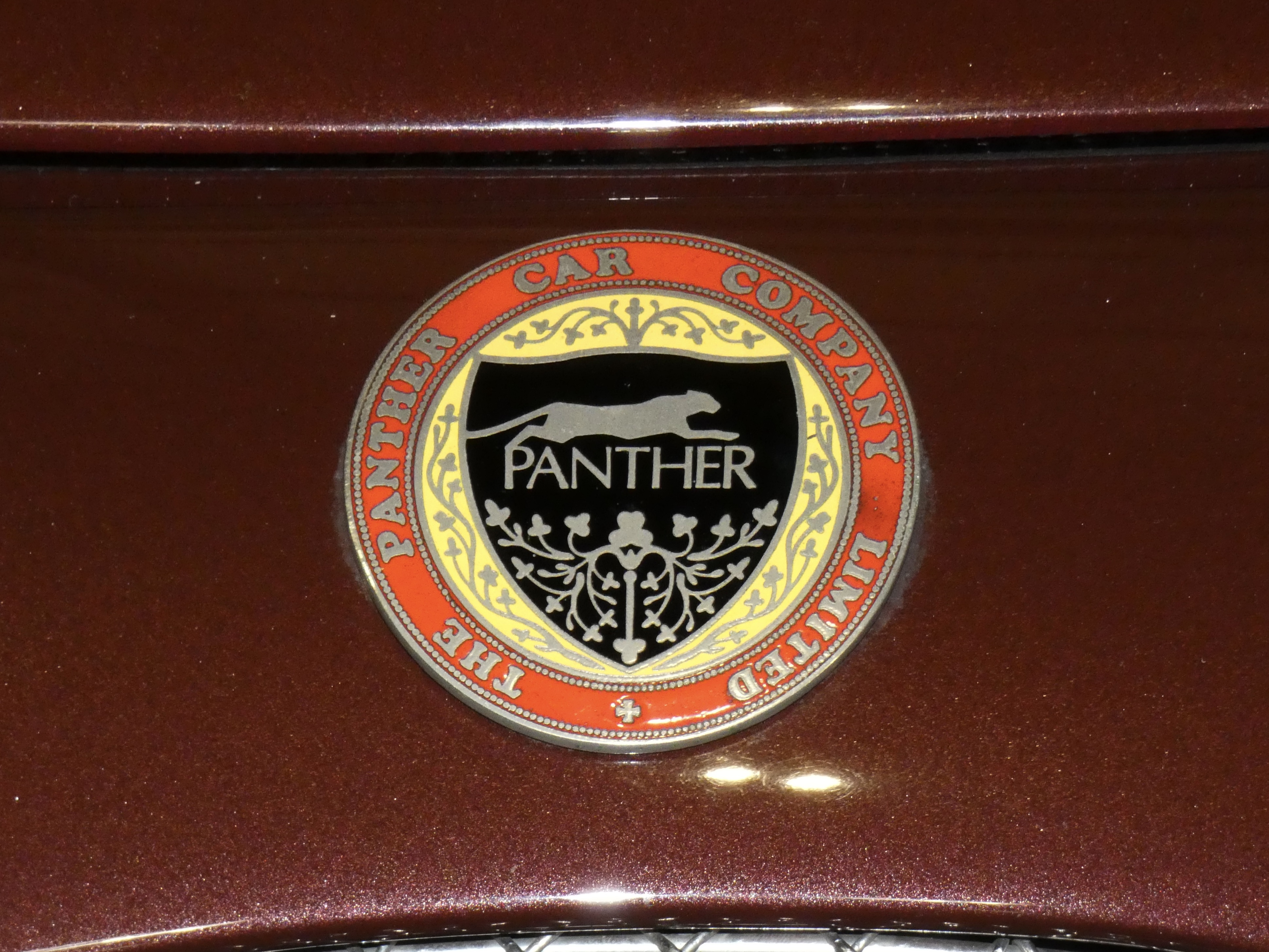
Panther Brooklands badge

Panther Westwinds (commonly known as Panther) was a manufacturer of niche sports cars and luxury cars, based in Surrey, England between 1972 and 1990.

== History ==
Founded in 1972 by Robert Jankel, the Panther company initially manufactured retro-styled cars based on the mechanical components of standard production cars from other manufacturers.

The Panther Lima bodyshell was manufactured from fibreglass by Industrial Marine Fibreglass (IMF), who were based on the Milber Industrial Estate, Newton Abbot, Devon. Other examples of cars manufactured by Panther included 1975's Rio: based on the Triumph Dolomite, but appointed to "Rolls-Royce standards" – the cost of which was equivalent to three Dolomites. Another model was the three-axled Panther 6, of which only two were manufactured.

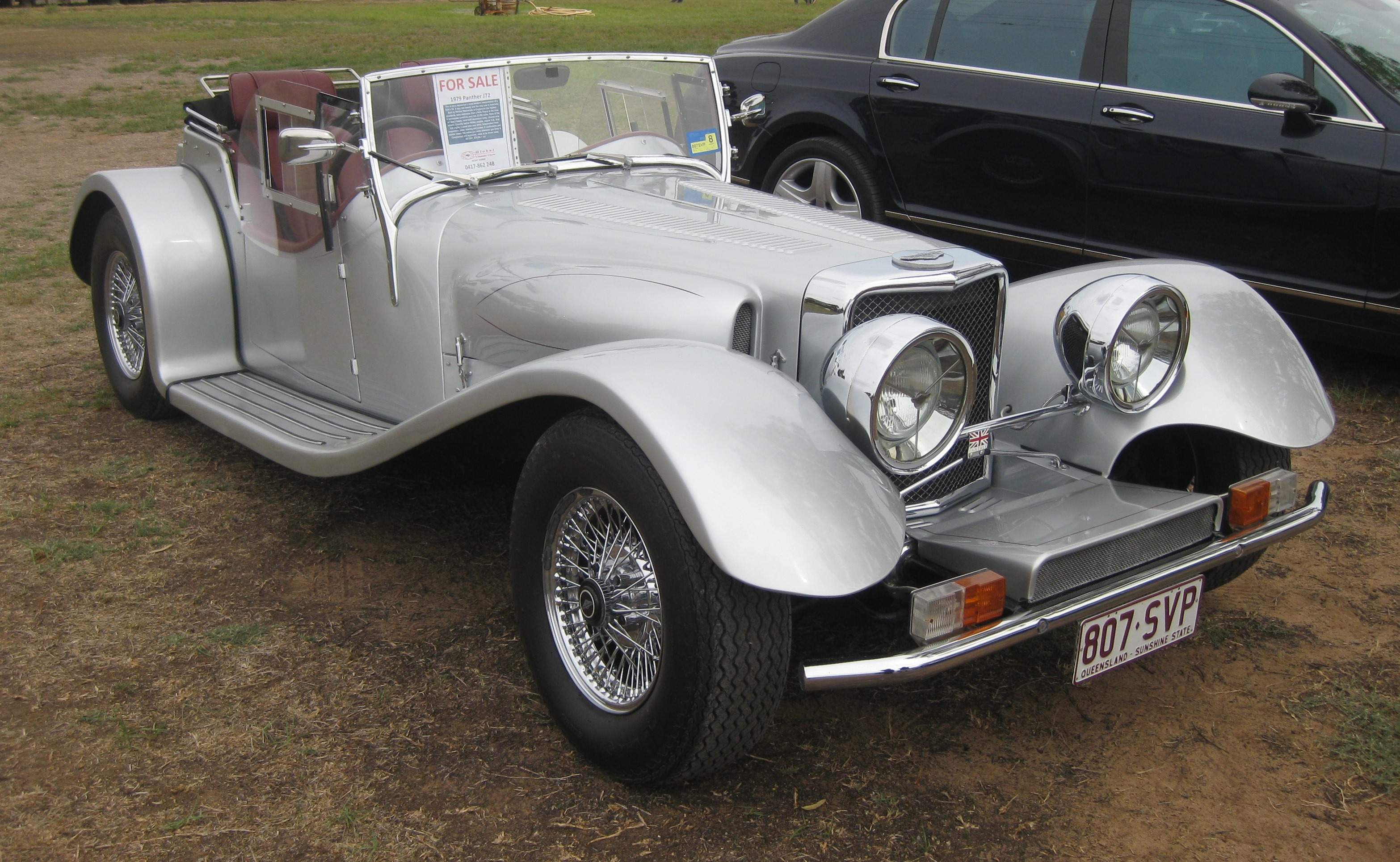
1972 Panther J72

During the late 1970s, the company was engaged in developing a hovercraft using a pair of Honda Gold Wing 1000cc motorcycle engines; one for the lift fan and one for the directional thrust fan. This was developed in some secrecy at the home of one of the directors of the company in a barn in Surrey, with technical help at one point from a specialist race mechanic working for a Honda dealership in South London. Progress and development stopped when the company collapsed. The present location, or even existence, of the vehicle is unknown.

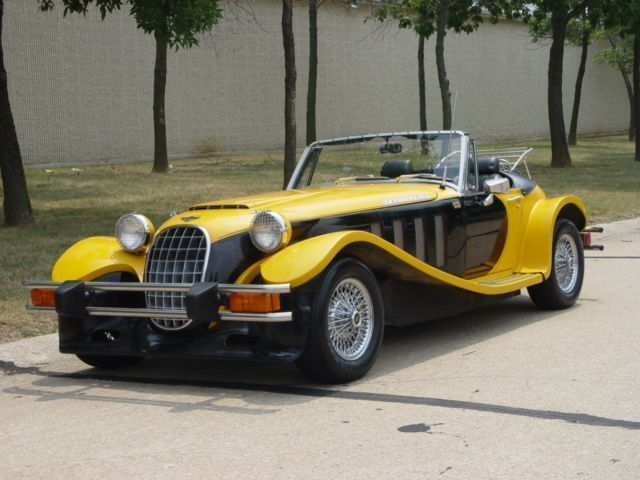
1978 Panther Lima MK II Turbo

The Panther Westwinds company collapsed in 1980 and was purchased by Young Chull Kim. Production of the J72, De Ville and Lima restarted in 1981. In 1982, Young Kim's Jindo Corporation in South Korea constructed the steel chassis platform and aluminium body for a car with Ford mechanics, to replace the Vauxhall-based Lima. Production of the new two-seater to be called Kallista began at Canada Road, Byfleet, Surrey in February 1983. Production transferred to a second factory within the Brooklands racetrack in January 1984 and continued there until April 1988. In July 1987, Jindo sold their interest in the Panther Car Company to SsangYong. Another Panther car factory was opened at Harlow, Essex in February 1988 for the new Kallista convertible, and production commenced there while continuing at Brooklands.

Later, development of the brand new original Panther Solo, a modern sports car commenced in 1983 at Canada Road. A re-design of the Solo changed it from a rear drive two-seater into a four-wheel drive two-plus-two. In the spring of 1990 SsangYong announced the end of the Kallista production at Harlow, followed in the autumn by their announcement that production of the Solo would also stop. SsangYong transferred the stock of parts to South Korea where they developed a glass reinforced plastic body for the Kallista, to be mounted on a chassis modified to increase interior width by 4 cm. The project was not a success although a number of wide body new 1990s Kallista models were sold in mainland Europe. SsangYong suffered financial difficulties and in 1999 their motor division was absorbed into Daewoo.

In 2001, Jankel bought the Panther name back from Korean ownership. He was finalising a new sports car design when he died in 2005. His son Andrew described it as an "unfinished symphony". Production was intended to have taken place in the United States.

== List of Panther vehicles ==
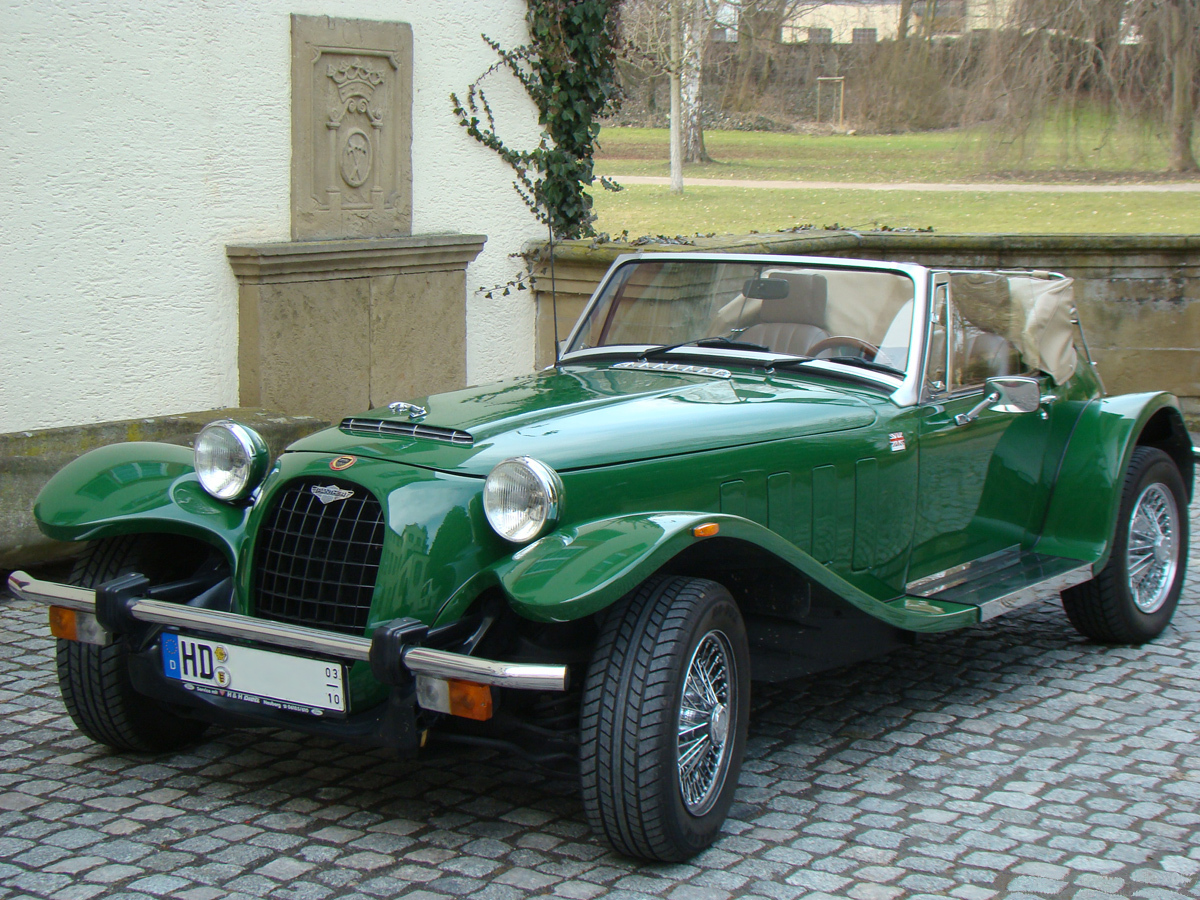
Panther Kallista

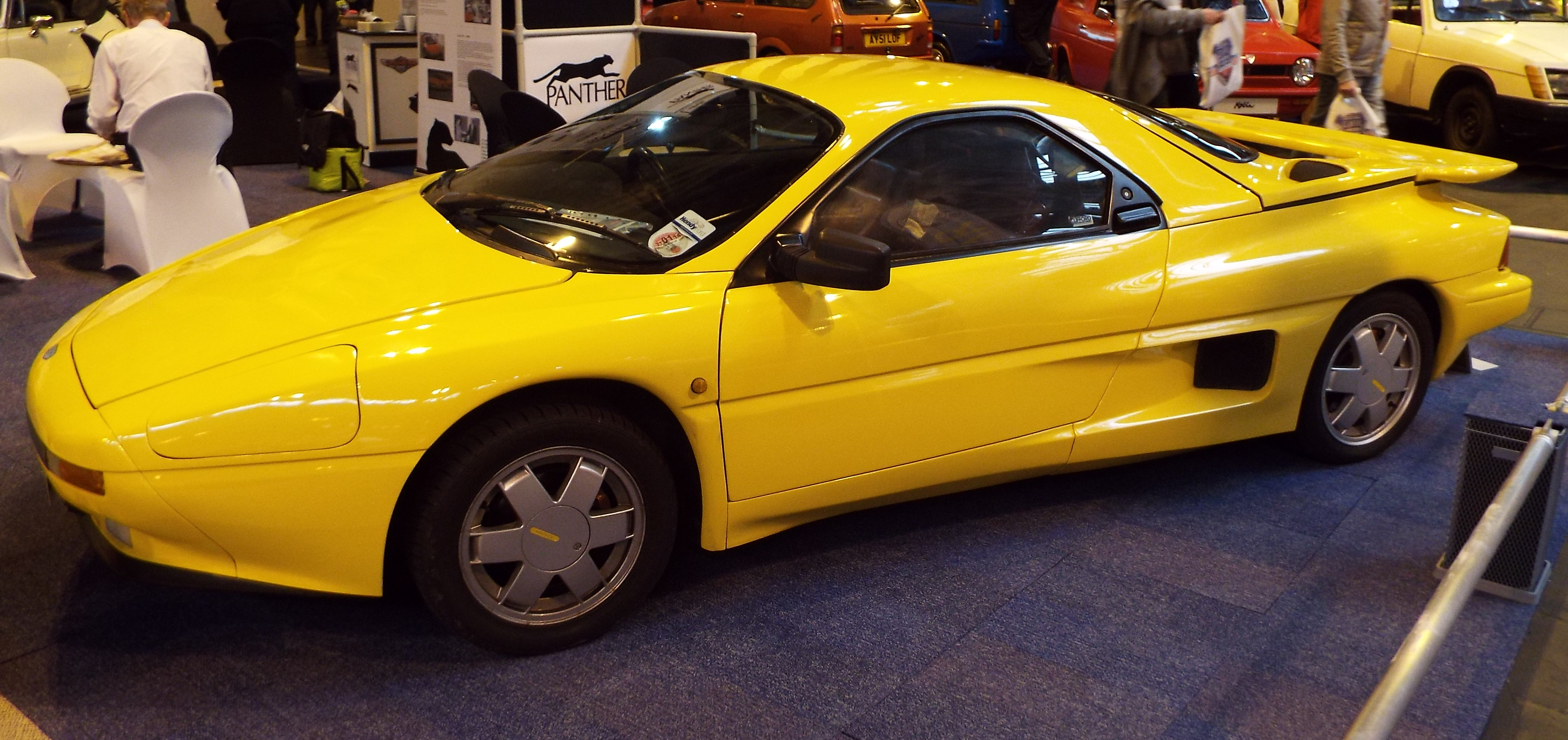
Panther Solo

- 1972–1981 Panther J.72
- 1974–1975 Panther FF
- 1974 Panther Lazer
- 1977 Panther Croisette
- 1981–1983 Panther Brooklands
- 1974–1985 Panther De Ville
- 1975–1977 Panther Rio
- 1976–1982 Panther Lima
- 1977–1978 Panther 6
- 1982–1990 Panther Kallista
- 1989–1990 Panther Solo

== See also ==
- List of car manufacturers of the United Kingdom
