= Jennifer Jankel =

British businesswoman

Jennifer Anne Jankel (born May 1940) is a retired British businesswoman.

== Early life and career ==
Jankel is the daughter of bandleader Joe Loss and his wife Mildred. She was educated in London at St Paul's Girls' School, Hammersmith and the Lycée Français Charles de Gaulle in South Kensington.

She became the UK managing director and vice-president of French shoe company Charles Jourdan before opening her own footwear business, Luc Berjen. Examples of her shoes are featured in the collections of the Victoria and Albert Museum. In 2011, she became chair of the Jewish Music Institute in London.

== Personal life ==
Jankel was married to car designer Robert Jankel from 1962 until his death in 2005. The couple, who had three sons and a daughter together, were founder members of North West Surrey Synagogue in Weybridge, of which she is now president.
