= Robert Jankel =

British automobile designer

Robert Jankel (1 January 1938 – 25 May 2005) was a British designer of limousines, armoured cars, and other speciality vehicles. He also founded the automotive company Panther Westwinds.

== Early life ==
Born in London on 1st January 1938, Jankel was educated at St Paul's School, he enjoyed sport especially rowing. He studied engineering at Chelsea College.

Jankel built his first car in 1954: he rebuilt and customised a wrecked Austin 7. After an unsuccessful attempt at selling cars, he agreed to join the family fashion business, Goldenfields. During his time as a fashion designer, he still worked on cars, including a classic 1930 Rolls-Royce, which he completely rebuilt in 1970. On a trip to Spain, a bullfighter offered Jankel £10,000 for the Rolls-Royce. It was this sale that inspired Jankel to found an automobile company.

== Panther Westwinds ==
In 1972, Jankel left the fashion industry to found motor company Panther Westwinds in Weybridge, Surrey, England. The company was named "Panther" because of its similarity to Jaguar and "Westwinds" after the Jankel family's home. The company's first car, a prototype two-seater called the Panther J72, was powered by a Jaguar engine and modelled after the Jaguar SS100. Although the asking price for the J72 was around twice that of contemporary Jaguar models, magazine advertisements generated enough interest for Jankel to produce one J72 a week during the car's production. Roughly 500 were produced.

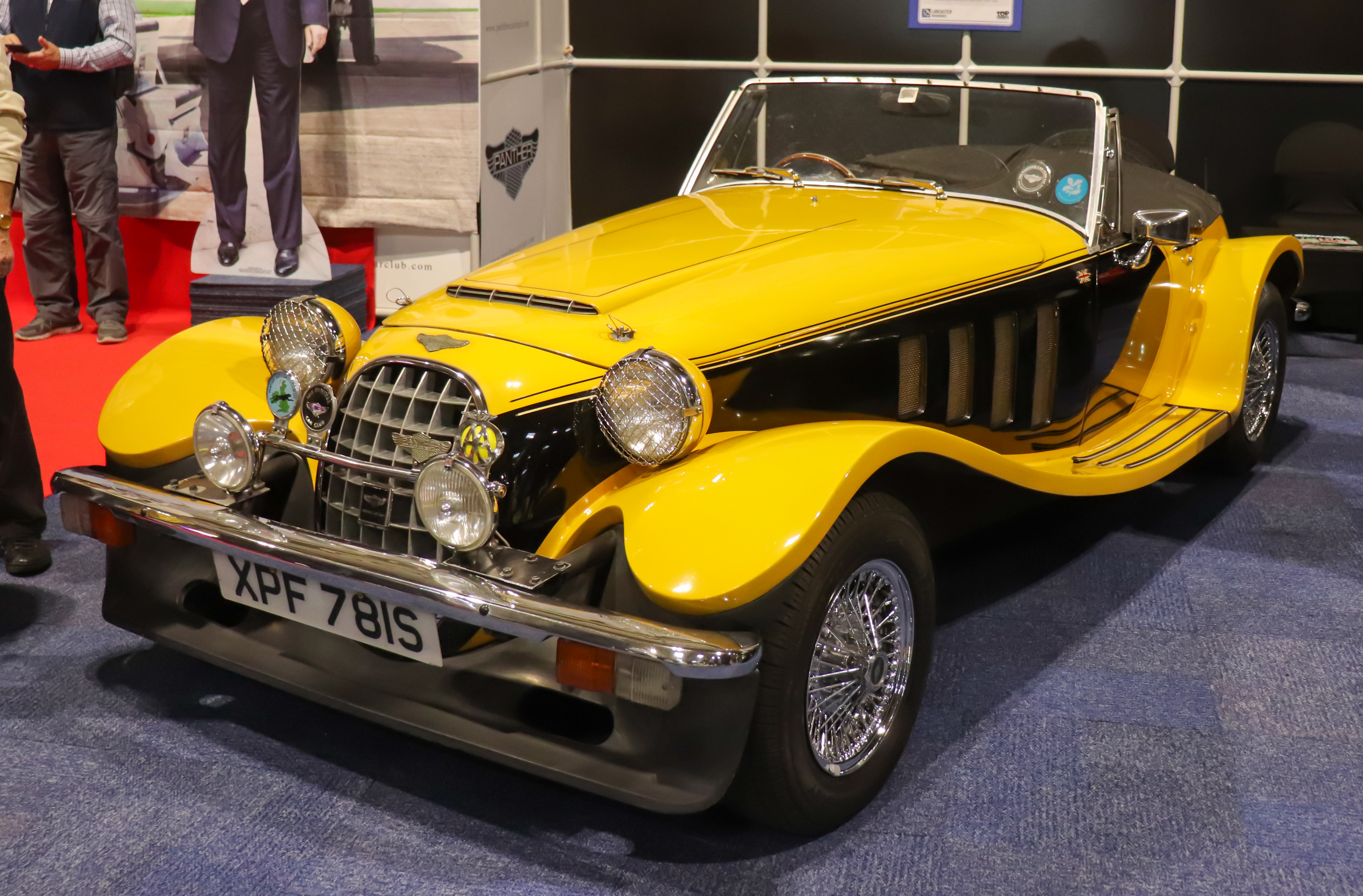
1978 Panther Lima

In 1974, Jankel produced the Panther De Ville, powered by a Jaguar engine and modelled after the Bugatti Royale. The De Ville cost twice as much as a Rolls-Royce Silver Shadow, and only the wealthiest of collectors could afford it. The Panther Rio, launched after one year, was based on the Triumph Dolomite. The luxurious saloon cost three times as much as a Dolomite, however, and only 38 were produced.

The Panther 6, a two-seater roadster outfitted with six wheels, followed in 1977, but because of its high cost (US$96,000) and unconventional design, only two were produced: one black and one white. The cars were fitted with a powerful Cadillac V8 Turbocharged engine, a detachable hard top and convertible soft top, electronic instruments, a 17,000 BTU air conditioner, an automatic fire extinguisher, electric seats and windows, a telephone and a dashboard-mounted television set.

Jankel's most successful vehicle was the Panther Lima. The Lima was styled like a 1930s roadster but used modern fibreglass technology for the body, which was built around a steel framework and chassis. More than 1,000 of the two marques of this model were built.

== The Jankel Group ==
Jankel Armouring logo

Panther Westwind went bankrupt in 1979, and it was subsequently sold to South Korean businessman Young Kim. Jankel then turned his focus to the Jankel Group, a coachbuilding company he had founded in 1955 but the firm had been little more than a hobby.

For the Jankel Group, Jankel concentrated on building specialist versions of cars for other high-end manufacturers, mostly Rolls-Royce, Bentley, Mercedes-Benz and Jaguar. From 1983 to 1989, Jankel was the exclusive subcontractor to Rolls-Royce to build more than 100 units of the Silver Spur Limousine. For Range Rover, he built a number of specialist hunting and all-terrain vehicles for Middle Eastern customers.

In 1992, he built the Jankel Tempest, a Chevrolet Corvette-based super car, with ultra-luxury interior and 6.7 litre supercharged V8, which produced 535 bhp and was capable of 200 mph, as well as holding the 1992 Guinness Book of Records 0-60 mph acceleration record of 3.89 seconds.

Most of Jankel's work from the 1990s to his death in 2005 was dedicated to building police vehicles, high-protection armoured cars and exotic luxury stretch limousines. In 1995, Jankel produced armoured cars for many police services, including the Metropolitan Police. All of Jankel's police vehicles were built on GM and Ford chassis. Jankel bought back the Panther name in 2001 and was working on the design of a new Panther sports car when he died in 2005.

The Jankel Group continues to build made-to-order speciality vehicles.

== Personal life ==
Jankel married Jennifer Loss, daughter of bandleader Joe Loss, in 1962. They had four children together: a daughter and three sons.

Jankel was an avid deer farmer. He and his wife were founding members of North West Surrey Synagogue.

Robert Jankel was diagnosed with pancreatic cancer in 2001. He remained an active member of the Jankel Group until his death in Weybridge on 25 May 2005.
