= Haynes Roadster =

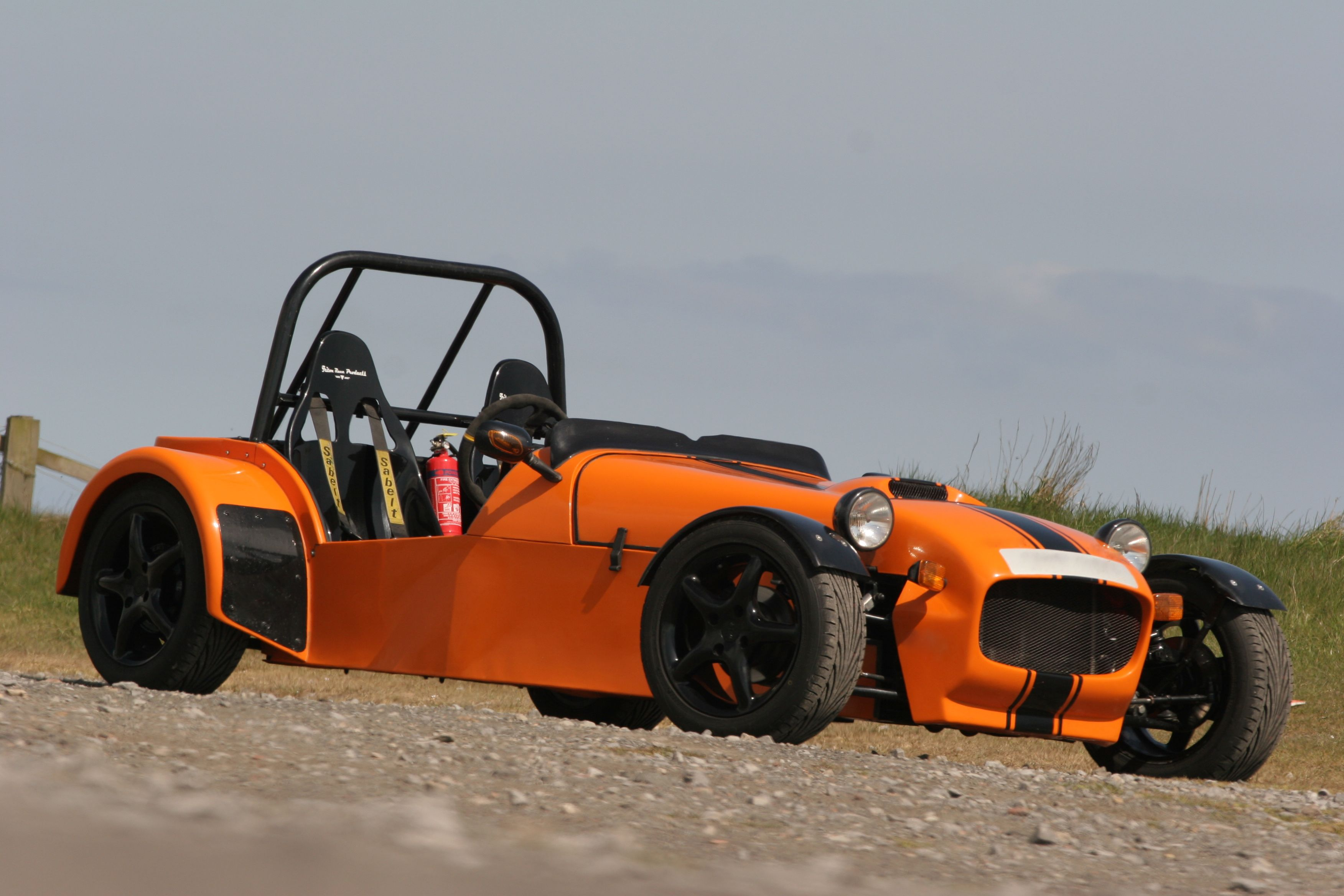

Overview
- Designer: Martin Keenan, Chris Gibbs

Body and chassis
- Class: Sports car
- Body style: Roadster
- Layout: FR

Dimensions
- Length: 331 cm
- Width: 172 cm
- Kerb weight: 500–700 kg

Chronology
- Predecessor: Locost

Haynes Roadster is a replica of a Lotus Seven home-built car, according to the book Build Your Own Sports Car: On a Budget by Chris Gibbs (ISBN 1-84425-391-0). A Ford Sierra is used in the car as a donor for drivetrain and suspension components.

The Haynes Roadster is a follow-up to the Locost design described in a book by Ron Champion. Locost uses a Ford Escort Mark II as a donor, but as these have become increasingly rare, a design based on the more affordable Ford Sierra has been proposed. In contrast to Locost, which used Escort's solid axle at the rear, Haynes Roadster has independent, double wishbone, front and rear suspension.

== Technical details ==
The main part of the car is a space frame chassis. The chassis can be cut to size at home and built according to instructions from rectangular 25×25 mm and 19×19 mm mild steel tubes. It can also be purchased as a flat-pack kit with sets of tubes cut to size and ready for assembly at home or even pre-built by the supplier. Since the cars are hand built and the book design is often modified to some extent, each chassis is unique, but as a rough guide, it weighs around 700 kg when completed.

The suspension wishbones are fabricated out of cold-drawn seamless mild steel tubes. Sierra front uprights are used with some modification. At the rear, fabricated uprights support Sierra rear hubs.

The drivetrain usually consists of a Ford Pinto, CVH, or Zetec engine mated to a Sierra gearbox, a shortened or custom-made propeller shaft, a Sierra differential, and driveshafts. The book design is based on the Type 9 gearbox, but the list of chassis modifications to fit the bigger MT75 transmission is provided on the Haynes forum.

The braking system is taken directly from the Ford Sierra, except for the vacuum servo, which is not required for lightweight cars.

The steering system is often composed of a lengthened Ford Sierra steering column and a Ford Escort MkII steering rack.

The bodywork is a combination of GRP parts and sheet aluminum panels.

Alternate donors can be used by adapting the design of the front and rear suspension; a common alternative is the BMW E30/E36 (an increasingly utilized kit car donor as in the GKD Legend) and the Mazda MX5. Other manufacturer's engines and gearboxes are also popular, such as the Vauxhall XE. The modern prevalence of Front-wheel drive layout makes the choice of suitable engine donors quite limited.

As the supply of Ford Sierra donors in the UK is waning, the use of Mazda MX-5 is becoming more widespread, with the modifications to the chassis and suspension necessary in order to accept MX-5 components being independently published by the members of the community.

== Legal Rules ==
=== UK ===
In the UK, self-built vehicles are subject to a stringent test. The now-defunct SVA (Single Vehicle Approval) was replaced in April 2009 with the IVA (Individual Vehicle Assessment), which costs £450 and is carried out by one of a number of VOSA testing stations throughout the UK. It is legal to drive to and from the IVA as long as the car is insured. Once the car has passed the IVA, it must be inspected by the DVLA (once DVLC) local office for the purpose of registration. The car is categorized as newly built and so by law an MOT test is not required until it has aged to three years, the same standard as newly built retail cars.

The DVLA will issue an age-related number plate if there is sufficient proof that a substantial portion of components were from the same donor car. The DVLA will issue a new car plate if the car is built from all new (1 part can be re-manufactured) components. The DVLA will issue a Q Plate if the parts are from many cars or an undetermined donor car.

=== Sweden ===
Technically, kit cars are not allowed in Sweden, but provided that most of the components and materials are sourced personally by the builder, it is possible to register them as amateur-built vehicles. The inspection (SVA equivalent) in Sweden is handled by the car builder's association SFRO which makes two inspections; one when the car has reached the rolling chassis stage and the second when the car is finished. Converting the MacPherson strut of the Ford Sierra to a double wishbone is not allowed, as it is not designed for it.

== Motorsport ==
By 2014, 2 completed road-legal Haynes Roadsters have been used in the UK in amateur Motorsport Events run by the MSA at clubman level at tarmac sprints and hill climbs. Just like the Locost car, the Haynes Roadster fits in the MSA's “specialist production car class” as identical chassis are or have been commercially available to the public in quantities over 20 made in a 12-month period (only if an engine made in over 1000 units is used from a land vehicle).
