= Locost =

Home-built car

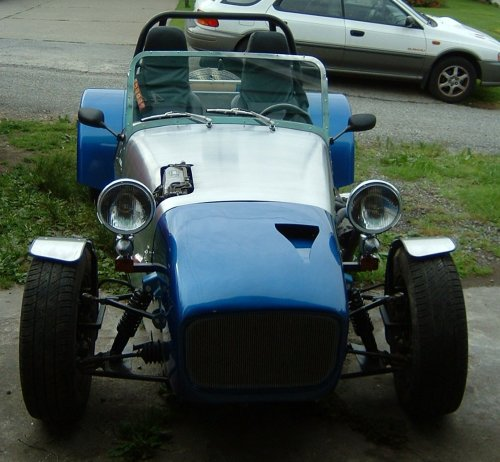
Canadian built example using running gear, engine, transmission, diff and brakes from a Toyota Corolla GT-S Twin Cam, uprights from a Hyundai Stellar and steering rack from MG MGB.

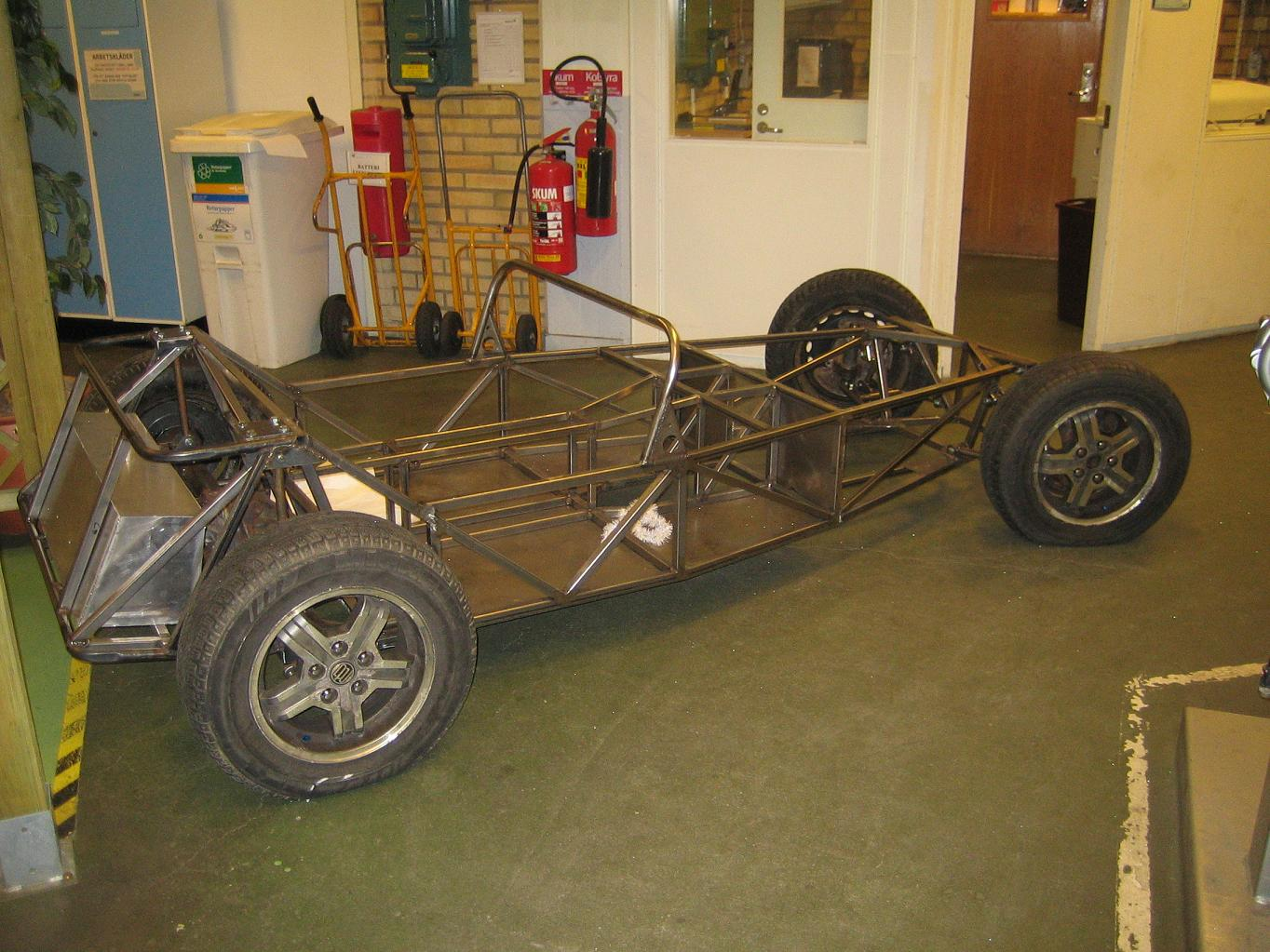
Locost spaceframe.

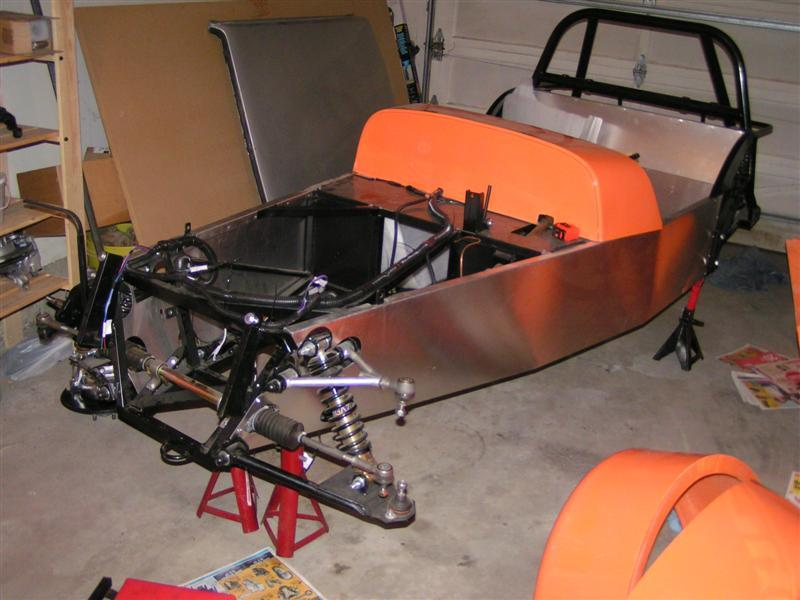
Locost frame and some body panels.

A Locost is a home-built car inspired by the Lotus Seven. The car features a space frame chassis usually welded together from mild steel 1 in × 1 in (25 mm × 25 mm) square tubing. Front suspension is usually double wishbone with coil spring struts. The rear is traditionally live axle, but has many variants including independent rear suspension or De Dion tube. Body panels are usually fibreglass nose and wings and aluminium side panels. Each car is highly individualized according to the resources, needs and desires of each respective builder.

The original design was intended to be built from scratch. However, the design has become so popular that several fabricators have begun producing the chassis in kit car form. Additionally, fibreglass body components, suspension pieces and other Locost-specific components can be sourced from various suppliers.

== Ron Champion's Locost ==
The Locost pattern originated in the mid 90s, and then with the publishing by Haynes Manuals of the book Build your own sports car for as little as £250 by Ron Champion (ISBN 1-85960-636-9). This design was based heavily on the original Lotus Seven. It also used a live axle rear suspension. The De Dion tube setup was used in factory racers and some of the models offered by Caterham.

Colin Chapman and Ron Champion have a background in the 750 Motor Club and the design of the Locost is based on a Lotus Race Car designed and built by Colin Chapman in 1963. The front of the Locost is of course "inspired by" the Lotus 7.

== Haynes Roadster ==
Ron Champion's original book was followed up with Build Your Own Sports Car: On a Budget (ISBN 1-84425-391-0) by Chris Gibbs. The subject car differs most significantly from the original in that it has an independent rear suspension. Additionally, the car was designed using CAD software, eliminating the measurement errors inherent to the original design. Other additions to the original Locost design include information for fabricating a rollbar and advice on using engines with fuel injection.

The suggested donor car is a Ford Sierra. The book contains alternative suggestions for incorporating other donors including a BMW E36, Mazda MX-5 and also motorcycle engines.

Roadsters are becoming an increasingly popular choice over the Locost due to the more plentiful donors and the more advanced suspension. Approximately 10 (as of April 2010) cars have been completed and passed by their countries' governments for use on the road. In the UK, this entails an IVA test and registration with the DVLA.

== Other Variations ==
The Locost is not to be confused with the similarly named Locust which is also a Lotus Seven-inspired car. In contrast to the Locost's space frame-inspired chassis, the Locust uses a ladder chassis and a body constructed from plywood skinned with aluminium.

=== McSorley Locost ===
The Champion Locost and the Haynes Roadster share similar chassis dimensions to the original Lotus Seven. Locost Builder Jim McSorley revised the Ron Champion design in order to accommodate wider engines, rear axles, and seats. In particular, the McSorley 442 design was referenced by Car and Driver Magazine in August 2006.

=== "Australian Modifications" ===
In Australia, kit cars must pass structural testing for certification for road use. This has led to a series of improvements to the Champion design, including increased reinforcement at the nose of the chassis and around the occupants. These modifications also increase the stiffness and torsional rigidity of the chassis and have been adopted in Locosts in other countries.

Various projects have analyzed the strength of the Locost Chassis under finite element analysis for interest's sake. The FEA is known to show the original Locost's design to be slightly under engineered.

== Cost of Construction ==
While the title of Ron Champion's book claims to offer a means to build a car for £250, most Locosts are usually as much as ten times that cost or more.

The £250 figure does not include the cost of tools, which can equal or exceed the cost of the car. The book also is based on purchasing a Mk1 or Mk2 Ford Escort that has been rejected for road use by the British MOT. At the time of printing, Champion claimed said cars could be purchased for £50. Rear wheel drive Escorts are now hard to find due to their becoming a classic car in their own right, continued use in Rallying and increased interest from collectors.

The book gives some hints and tips on how to cut the costs for the build:

- Build the chassis from scrap metal instead of buying new
- Make your own fibreglass nose cone and wheel arches instead of buying them
- Use the rear seat from the donor or one from the junkyard instead of buying new race seats
- Use the donor gauges, steering wheel and rims instead of buying new
- Buy wrongly mixed paint at a discount and paint the car yourself
- Find some aluminium sheet metal at the scrapper (for instance from the side of a van) to use for the bonnet

Some builders have come up with additional cost saving tips:

- Use the sheet metal roof of the donor for the bottom of the chassis instead of buying new sheet metal
- Use the fuel tank from a Saab 96 or Triumph Spitfire
- Use the headlights and chrome rims from an older Volvo 240 (or 8" round sealed beams) and an 8-inch stainless steel salad bowl from IKEA to make the headlights
- Make your own coilovers.

Even at ten times the £250, Locosts frequently cost far less than a car of similar performance.

== Common donor vehicles ==
The car described in the Champion book is built using parts from a Mk1 or Mk2 Ford Escort with front spindles from Ford Cortina. Due to the dwindling supply of Escorts, the Haynes Roadster is based on mechanicals from the Ford Sierra. Some use small car-based trucks as donors such as the Mitsubishi L300, Mazda E1800 (same gearbox as the MX-5) and Suzuki Carry (aka Bedford Rascal, Vauxhall Rascal, Holden Scurry, Chevrolet Supercarry and Maruti Omni).

In North America, the Toyota Corolla and Mazda Miata are popular donor cars, as are the Ford Fox platform cars. The Wankel engine-based Mazda RX-7 is also starting to become popular.

Many different companies make and sell parts and complete kits for building the car. Examples include MK Engineering (who have continued on the concept and now offer their MK Indy, based on the Ford Sierra), RaceTech with their Lada-based ESTfield, DD7 in Umeå, Sweden and many more.

== Racing ==
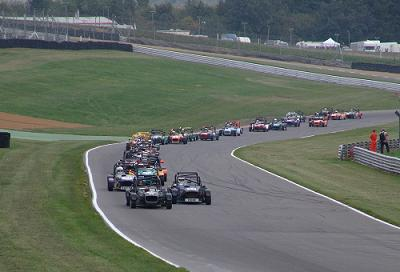
Locosts racing at Brands Hatch in 2005.

The Locost has produced one of the most successful championships in UK Club Motor sport, the Formula Locost. Organised by the 750 Motor Club the championship regularly sees around 35 competitors racing at circuits such as Brands Hatch, Donington, Oulton Park and Silverstone, to name but a few. Running with very tight regulations and deliberately limiting costs, the 750 Motor Club have ensured affordable and close competitive racing for the enthusiastic amateur. While it is not really possible to build a race car for the £250 quoted in the title of the book by Ron Champion, it is one of the cheaper forms of motor sport available in the UK, with season costs of around £5000 after racewear, car and trailer.

While Locost racing is not as popular in North America, Locosts are eligible to compete in several amateur racing formats under many governing bodies such as the SCCA and NASA. Grassroots Motorsports' $200X Challenge has a special category for Locosts and other kit cars.

== See also ==
- List of car manufacturers of the United Kingdom
