= MK Indy =

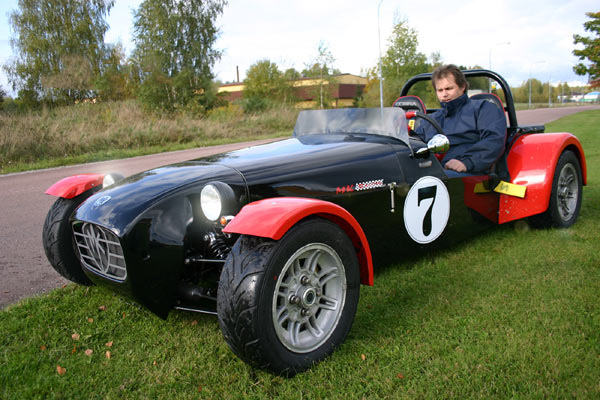
A Swedish MK Indy.

The MK Indy is a Lotus 7 replica based on the Locost principle, production started in 1997 and built by MK Sportscars in Maltby, Rotherham until production moved to Braintree, Essex in 2016. The Indy has an independent rear suspension using the differential and drive shafts from a Ford Sierra. It uses many other components from the Sierra, including front hubs and steering rack. Further, it can be fitted with any of a variety of engines, the most popular choices being the Ford Pinto engine from the Sierra for its ease and cheapness or a large motorcycle engine for its light weight and high rpm.

Resurrected in November 2016, the company is now based in Braintree, Essex with a more modern take on the build. By using the engine and running gear from the NB Mazda MX-5, the updated MK Indy RX-5 ignites the spark from the little Japanese engine once more. The mixture of a low price entry kit and the options from there on, allows for a perfect B-road cruiser to an ultimate track weapon.

The newer form of the MK Indy, now houses one of two huge power-plants; The Honda Civic Type-R V-tec K20 engine or the vicious Suzuki Hayabusa 1340cc motorbike engine.

Updates to the chassis have made the car more nimble and precise than ever, propelling the car to enter into race track domination. The Cup 200 car begins its racing journey with the 750 Motor Club in April 2023 with sights set on having a full MK Cup 200 grid, opening the door for a pure skill based event to rival all.

== See also ==
- List of car manufacturers of the United Kingdom
