= Ford Sierra =

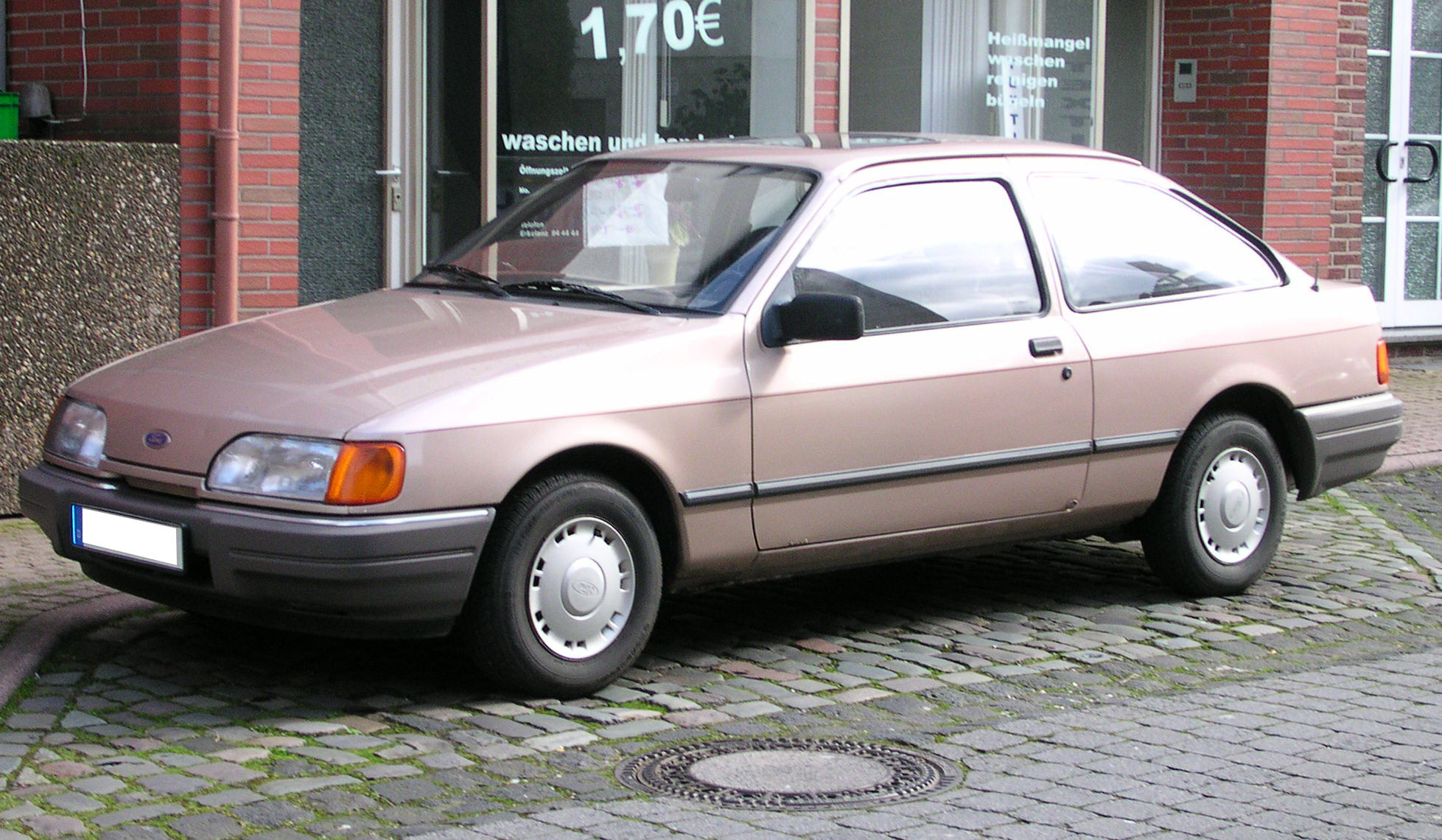

Overview
- Manufacturer: Ford Europe
- Also called: Merkur XR4Ti (North America, 1985–1989); Ford Sapphire (sedan, South Africa, 1990–1993)
- Production: 1982–1993
- Assembly: Argentina: General Pacheco (Pacheco Stamping and Assembly); Belgium: Genk (Genk Body & Assembly); Ireland: Cork (Ford Ireland); New Zealand: Lower Hutt (Ford New Zealand); South Africa: Port Elizabeth; Silverton, Pretoria (Samcor); United Kingdom: Dagenham, London (Ford Dagenham); Venezuela: Valencia (Valencia Assembly, 1985–1994)
- Designer: Uwe Bahnsen; Bob Lutz; Patrick le Quément

Body and chassis
- Class: Mid-size car/Large family car (D)
- Body style: 3/5-door hatchback; 4-door saloon; 5-door estate; 5-door car-derived van
- Layout: Front-engine, rear-wheel drive / four-wheel drive
- Related: Ford Scorpio; Ford P100; Merkur XR4Ti

Powertrain
- Engine: Petrol: 1294 cc Pinto I4; 1593 cc Pinto I4; 1598 cc CVH I4; 1769 cc CVH I4; 1796 cc Pinto I4; 1993 cc Pinto I4; 1993 cc Cosworth turbo DOHC 16V I4; 1998 cc N8/N9 DOHC I4; 1999 cc Cologne OHV V6; 2293 cc Cologne OHV V6; 2792 cc Cologne OHV V6; 2935 cc Cologne OHV V6; 2993 cc Essex OHV V6 (ZA); 4942 cc 5.0 H.O. OHV V8 (ZA); Diesel: 1753 cc Lynx TD I4; 2304 cc Indenor OHV I4
- Transmission: 3-speed automatic 4-speed automatic 4-speed manual 5-speed manual

Dimensions
- Wheelbase: 2,609 mm (102.7 in)
- Length: 4,531 mm (178.4 in)
- Width: 1,727 mm (68.0 in)
- Height: 1,367 mm (53.8 in)

Chronology
- Predecessor: Ford Cortina Mark V Ford Taunus TC3
- Successor: Ford Mondeo

The Ford Sierra is a mid-size/large family car manufactured and marketed by Ford of Europe from 1982–1993. It was launched as a three-door or five-door hatchback or a five-door estate car, with a car-derived van variant added in 1984 and the four-door Sierra Sapphire saloon car introduced in 1987 when the range was facelifted. The engine is mounted in the front with rear-wheel drive on most models and four-wheel drive on certain models.

It was designed by Uwe Bahnsen, Robert Lutz and Patrick Le Quément, and was noted for its aerodynamic styling. It has a drag coefficient of 0.34, a significant improvement over its predecessors. The Sierra debuted at the 1982 British International Motor Show at the National Exhibition Centre (NEC), Birmingham, then appeared at the 1982 Paris Salon de l'Automobile. Sales began on 15 October 1982, replacing the Ford Taunus TC3 and Ford Cortina Mark V. The Sierra's aerodynamic styling and the initial absence of a saloon alienated many conservative buyers, including company car drivers.

Developed under the internal code name "Project Toni", the Sierra name is derived from the Spanish word for a mountain range. Most cars were manufactured in Belgium and the United Kingdom, although Sierras were also assembled in Cork, Ireland, Argentina, Venezuela, South Africa, and New Zealand.

== Initial development and reception ==
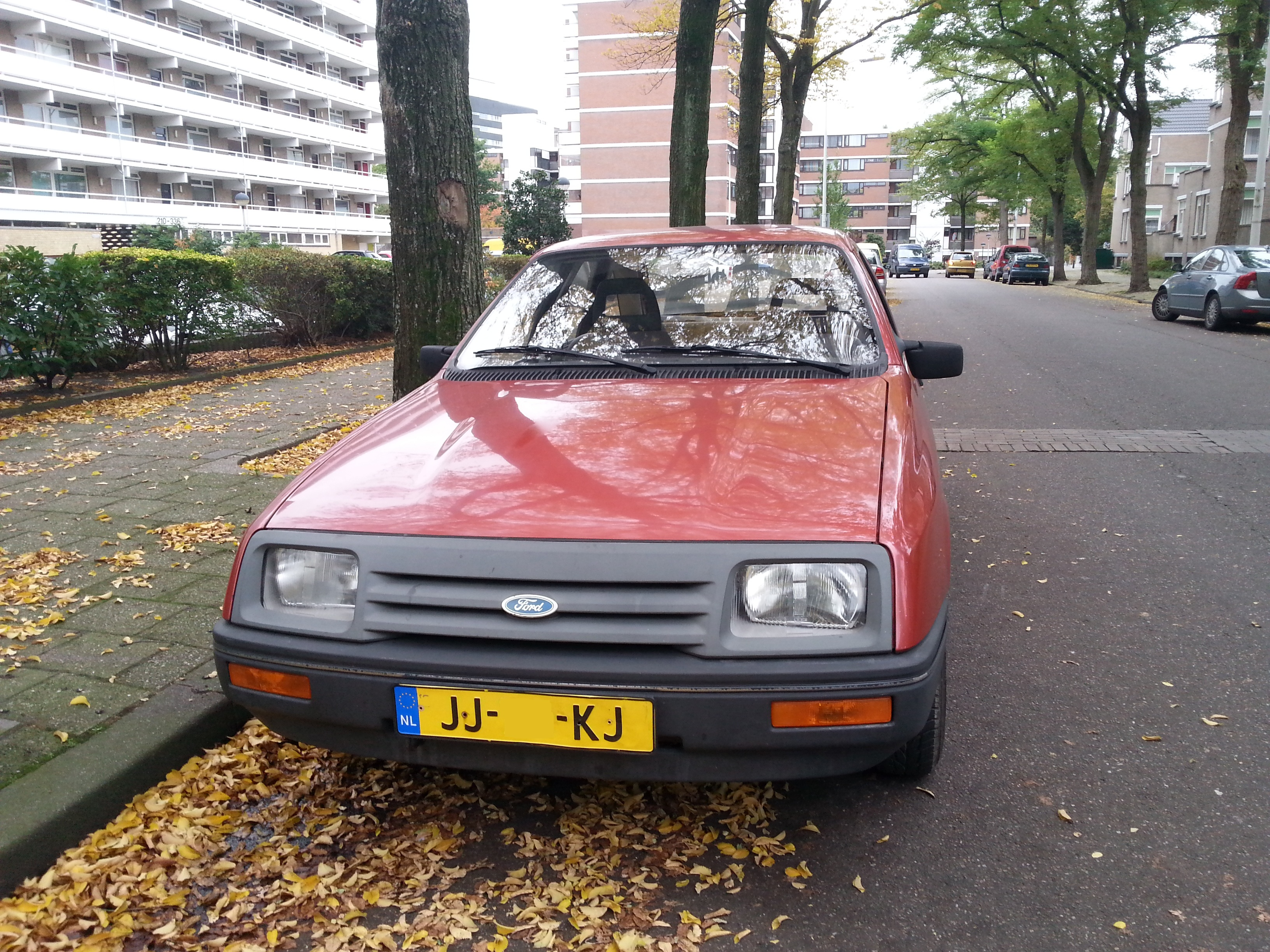
The distinctive unpainted nose of the Sierra′s base model

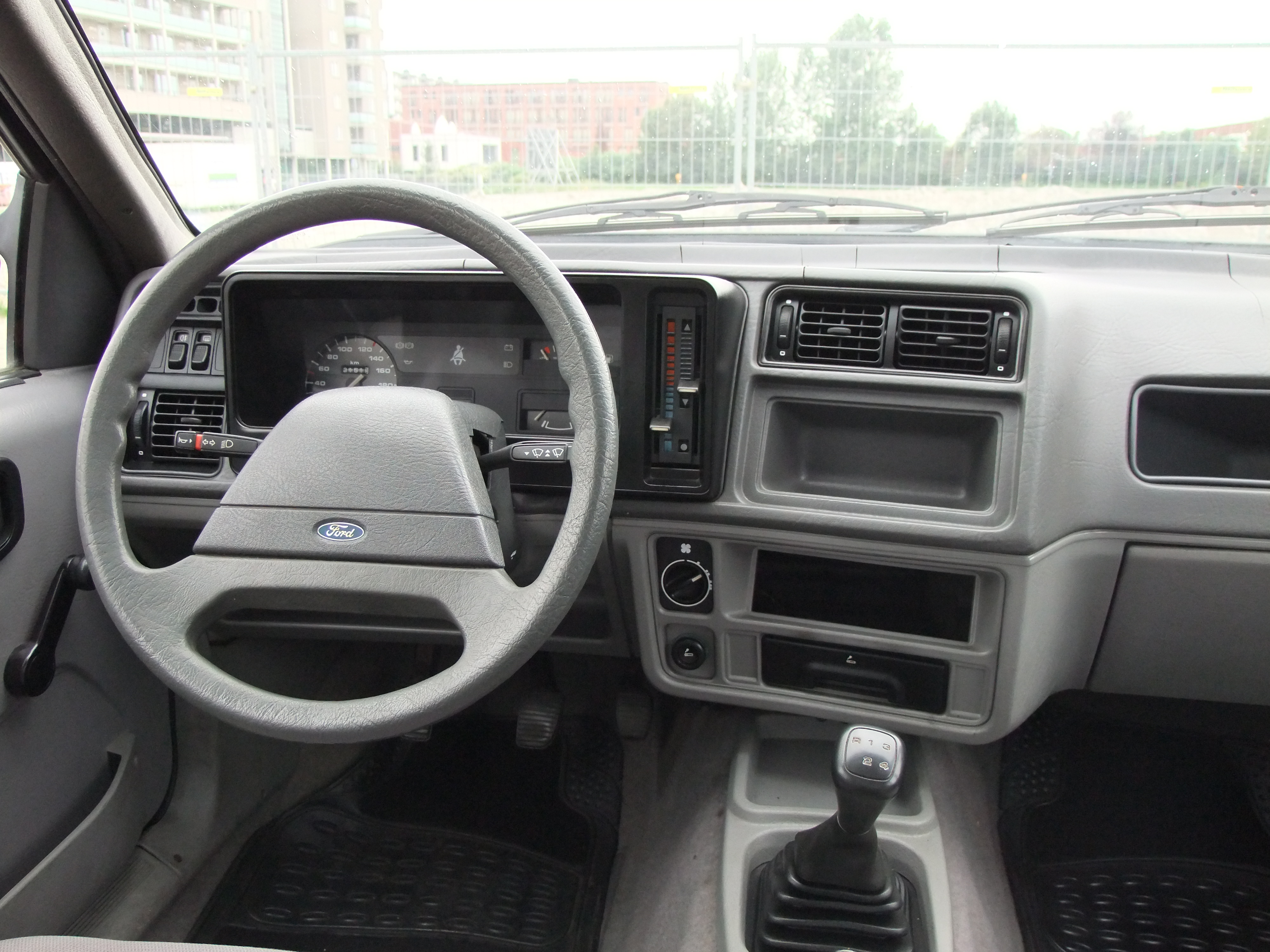
The dashboard of an early 1983 base model

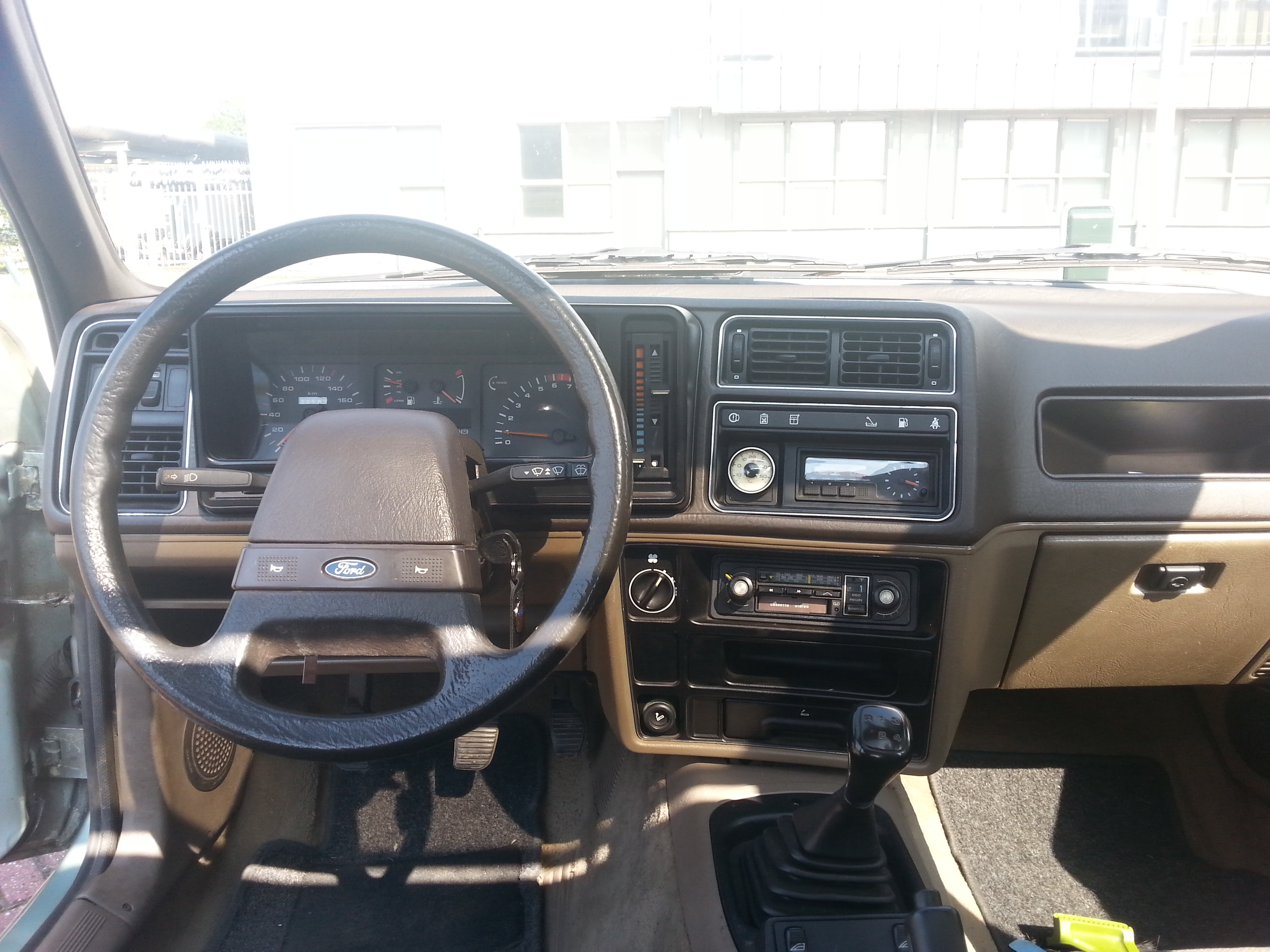
The dashboard of an early 1983 GL-model

By 1978, Ford Europe was working on a new mid-range model, codenamed "Project Toni", to replace the Cortina/Taunus twins in the early 1980s. Although still popular with buyers, the outgoing Cortina/Taunus was a 12-year old design by the time of the Sierra's launch — despite the TC2 shape being launched in 1976, and the mildly reworked TC3/Mk5 three years later, both were merely reskinned versions of the 1970 TC/Mk3, with few major mechanical changes. Ford's future model policy and styling direction had already been shown with the Escort III two years earlier, with the conventionally styled saloons of the 1970s replaced by hatchbacks with advanced aerodynamic styling.

In 1981, a year before the Sierra's official launch, Ford confirmed that its new mid-range car be called the Sierra, signalling the end of the Taunus and Cortina nameplates after 43 years and nine generations, or 20 years and five generations respectively. In September 1981, Ford unveiled the Probe III concept car at the Frankfurt Motor Show, hinting at what the new car would look like when unveiled 12 months later.

After the sharp-edged straight-line three-box styling of its predecessors, the Sierra was nicknamed "the jellymould". The shape served a purpose though, producing a drag coefficient of 0.34, a significant improvement over the boxy outgoing Taunus's/Cortina's 0.45. This aerodynamic design was key for reducing fuel consumption according to Ford, and was even used as compensation for the V6 engines. The interior was more conventional, taking a page from BMW by its dashboard, angled to the driver.

Sales were slow in the first months – aggravated by heavy discounting by Ford dealers of surplus Cortina stock from the autumn of 1982 on, with more than 11,000 new Cortinas being registered in 1983. However in 1983, its first full year of sales, the Sierra managed nearly 160,000 sales in Britain, outsold only by the smaller Escort. Ford had also launched the more conservatively designed Escort-based Orion saloon that year, which found favour with buyers who would otherwise have been the Sierra's target customers.

In West Germany, it proved popular from an early stage; within months of its launch, it was reportedly achieving treble the number of sales that the Taunus had been attaining – though in West Germany, the Taunus had not been quite as popular or iconic as its Cortina equivalent had been in Britain.

It was later in the Sierra's life that the styling began to pay off; ten years after its introduction, the Sierra's styling was not nearly as outdated as its contemporaries, even though all major competitors were newer designs, though the Sierra had been tweaked on several occasions and many new engines had been added. The most notable changes came in early 1987, with a major facelift and the addition of a 4-door saloon, known in the UK as the Sapphire. As other manufacturers adopted similar aerodynamic styling, the Sierra looked more normal. At its peak, it was Britain's second best selling car in 1983, 1988 and 1989, and was still Britain's fifth best selling car in 1992 as it neared replacement. Its best year was 1989, when more than 175,000 were sold. However, it was outsold by the Vauxhall Cavalier in MK2 form during 1984 and 1985, and then from 1990 until its demise by the MK3 Cavalier. Nevertheless, it comfortably outsold its second key rival, the Austin Montego, which was launched in April 1984. Between 1985 and 1988, the Sierra faced fresh competition in Europe from the likes of the Renault 21 and Peugeot 405, while Japanese carmaker Nissan was producing its Bluebird model in Britain from 1986.

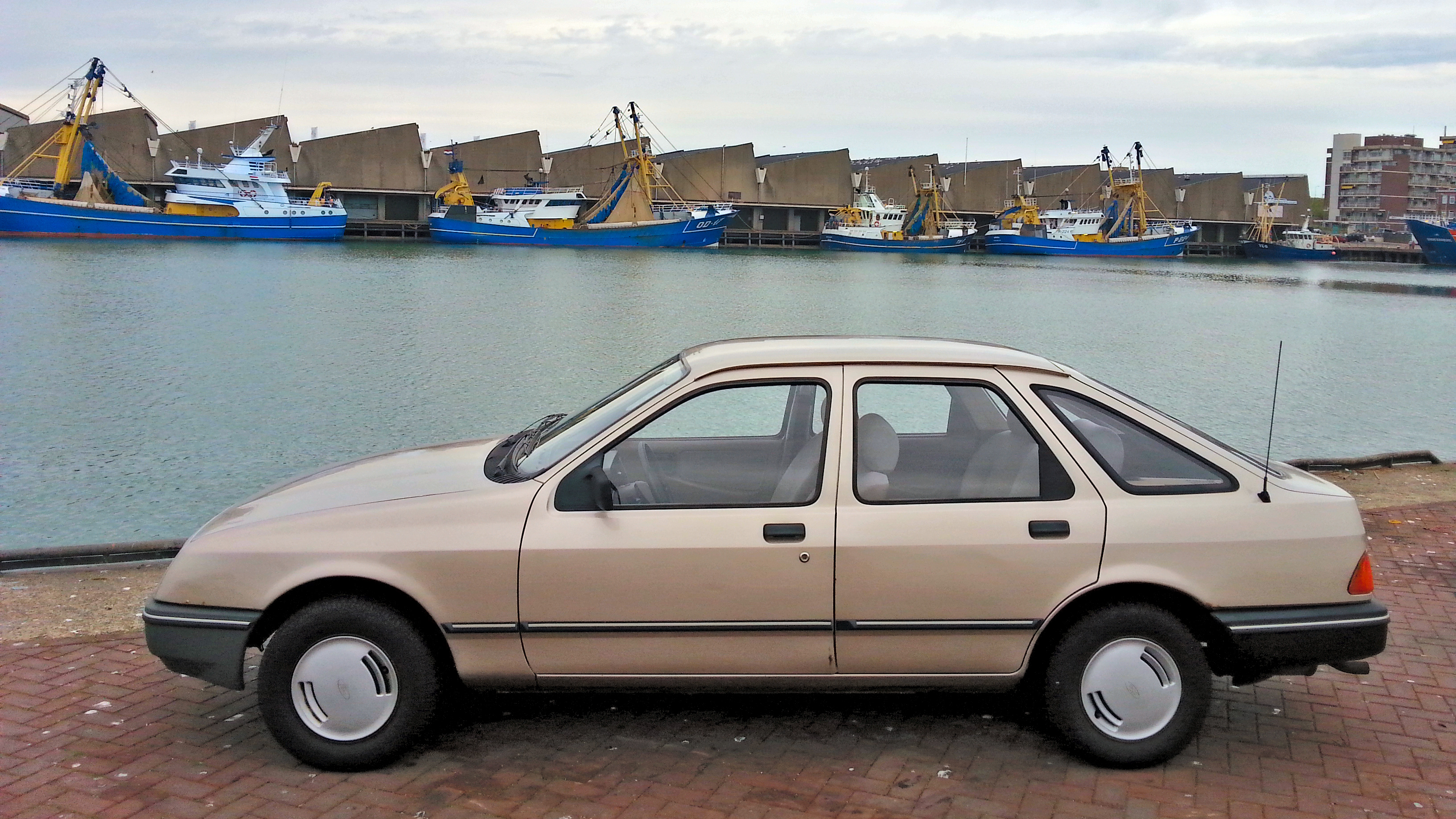
An early 1983 Sierra L-model, without the "strakes" to adjust crosswind stability

Early versions suffered from crosswind stability problems, which were addressed in 1985 with the addition of aerodynamic nolders (small spoilers) on the rear edge of the rubber seals of the rearmost side windows. These shortcomings saw a lot of press attention, and contributed to early slow sales, when it was outsold by its key rival the Vauxhall Cavalier in 1984 and 1985. Other rumours that the car's design could hide major crash damage (in part true, as the new bumper design sprang back after minor impact and couldn't be "read" to interpret major damage) also harmed the car's reputation. This reached near-hysterical heights in its early months on sale, with UK press making a report that Ford would reintroduce the previous Cortina model out of desperation. These reports were swiftly denied by Ford. However, sales began to rise during 1983, and it finished as Britain's second best selling car behind the Escort. After being outsold by the Cavalier for the next two years, it regained its lead of the market sector in Britain during 1986, and a refreshed range (with more engine options as well as the introduction of a saloon) enjoyed a surge in sales from 1987, though the MK3 Cavalier finally outsold it in 1990. Even in 1992, the Sierra was still Britain's fifth best selling car. It was nicknamed "the salesman's spaceship" on account of its status as a popular fleet car in Britain.

In contrast to the Sierra's exterior design, its drivetrain was conservatively engineered, retaining rear-wheel drive and the same engines and transmissions as the Cortina/Taunus which were effectively 12 years old as they were first used on the TC1/MkIII generation in 1970. Much of this was done to appease the important fleet market which was wary of complexity. However, there was much modification; for example the engines were fitted with breakerless ignition, improved carburettors and the option of fuel injection, whilst 5-speed transmissions were now available. Most competitors were already switched to front-wheel drive around that time. Ford claimed however this set-up was required to offer V6 engines, which had to contribute to the Sierra's driving comfort. New for the Sierra was a diesel engine, although the engine itself was not new at all. Similar to the Ford Granada, Ford used an "Indenor" engine which was designed by Peugeot in the 1950s. While the Granada was offered with 1.9, 2.1, and 2.5 diesels, the Sierra unit had a displacement of 2.3 litres. This rather outdated engine was replaced in 1989 by an all-new, 1.8-litre turbodiesel, developed by Ford itself. The Sierra had a four-speed manual gearbox as standard, with a five-speed as option but standard on the 2.3D and 2.3 V6. At a time when the rival Vauxhall Cavalier was offered with a five-speed, this led to some critics commenting that the Sierra was somewhat underpowered. In the mid-1980s, many smaller cars (some even two segments smaller) featured five-speed gearboxes as standard.

The chassis, however, was more sophisticated than the Cortina/Taunus, with fully independent suspension on both axles. The rear suspension was essentially carried over from the Granada, with trailing arms and coil springs mounted on a tubular subframe which also provided location for the final drive/differential housing driving the axle shafts. The front suspension dispensed with the Cortina/Taunus' double wishbones in favour of a scaled-up version of the Fiesta and Escort/Orion's layout with MacPherson struts, lower locating arms, and anti-roll bars.

One striking feature of the Sierra was its closed front panel — where typically a grille was located, later found on the 1985 Ford Taurus. The air intake was situated below the front bumper, making the Sierra a so-called 'bottom breather'. The headlights were integrated in this front panel while the indicators were mounted in the bumper within a combined unit with the foglights. However, this setup was present only on the top-of-the-line "Ghia" trim as well on the later introduced XR4i sportmodel. The other Sierra models had a more traditional front end with a two-bar grille between the headlights, being unpainted on the base model. These models had the indicators in the bumper as well, although being slimmer but wider and without the foglights. Both the Ghia and XR4i had wide headlights with two lenses while the other models had smaller lights with a single lens. For the 1985 model year, all the lower-spec models, except the base model, adopted the Ghia's and XR4i's front grille and headlight treatment. However, the second lens of the lower-spec models had no actual light within it. On the Ghia and XR4i this lens contained additional high-beam lamps. The South-African XR8 model's front end was similar to the XR4i's but featured a small grille between the headlights. The rear lights of the Ghia, as well as the very early XR4i's, were the same shape and layout as other models, but featured tiny horizontal black strakes on the lenses to give the impression that they were smoked.

The Sierra initially competed directly with the General Motors "J-car" (Opel Ascona C/Vauxhall Cavalier), which had been launched in 1981 with front-wheel drive and a hatchback body style to complement the saloon.

It was also a strong competitor for other rivals of the early 1980s, including the Talbot Alpine, Peugeot 505 and Morris Ital and the Citroën BX, but by 1988 it was competing with a host of new rivals, including the third-generation Vauxhall Cavalier (Opel Vectra), Rover Montego, Peugeot 405, Renault 21 and Nissan Bluebird. By the time of the Sierra's replacement it stood out from almost all D-segment rivals for its rear-wheel drive layout.

The car was replaced by the Mondeo in Europe in April 1993, though stocks lasted for about two years afterwards. The Sierra remained a popular second-hand buy and a common sight on British roads until well beyond the year 2000.

=== Press evaluation ===
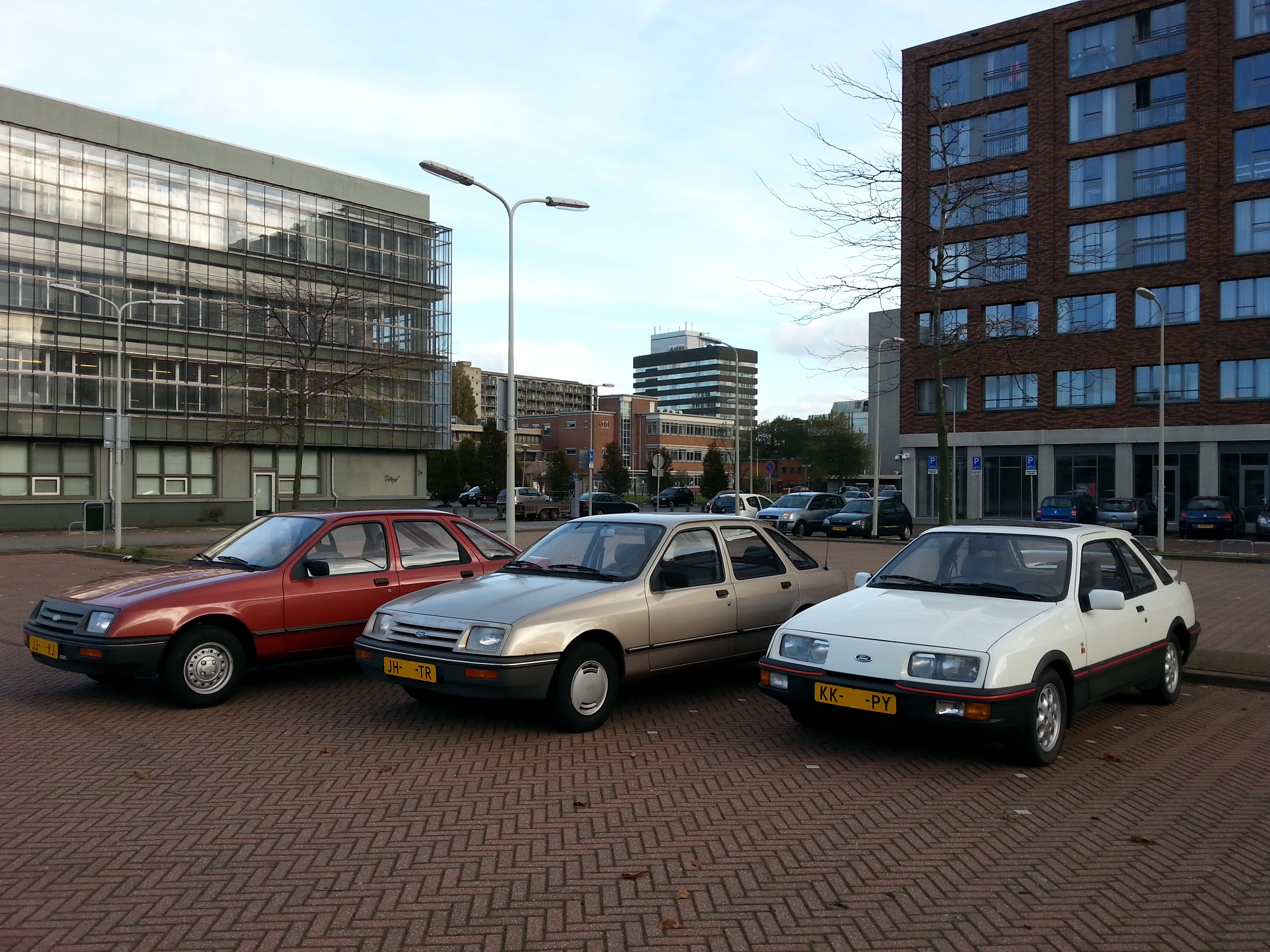
Three different Sierra MkI models. From left to right: 1983 base model, 1983 L-model and 1984 XR4i.

In Europe's largest auto-market, the magazine Auto, Motor und Sport published, in December 1982, a three-way road test comparison involving the Sierra and its obvious competitors, the recently upgraded Volkswagen Passat and Opel Ascona (Vauxhall Cavalier Mk II in the UK). The Sierra tested in 1982 outranked both the Passat and the Ascona.

The significance of this result was highlighted more than three decades later, in February 2015, when the magazine reported that no Ford model had beaten a Volkswagen under their road test criteria since the Sierra's "victory" in 1982.

The Sierra missed out on the 1983 European Car of the Year award, ending second behind the Audi 100.

=== Celebrity ===
Just before he became leader of the Labour Party in 1983, Neil Kinnock became the owner of one of the first Sierras produced for the British market, but his car was wrecked in a crash on the M4 motorway in Berkshire soon after he bought it. He escaped from the crash uninjured.

In 1986, the founder of the Williams Formula One team, former racing car driver and mechanic, Sir Frank Williams crashed whilst driving a rental Ford Sierra in France, rendering him tetraplegic.

Willem-Alexander, then Prince of the Netherlands, crashed his Sierra XR4x4 in 1988 in the city of Leiden where he attended the university as a student.

== All-wheel drive ==
In 1985, at the Geneva Motor Show, the four-wheel-drive Sierra XR4x4 was shown as a derivative of the XR4i. It had two viscous differentials with two thirds of the power directed towards the rear wheels. It was originally available only as a three-door hatchback; the bodywork had the large single-piece rear windows rather than the design with an additional pillar as used on the XR4. The XR4x4 had a single rear spoiler instead of the distinctive biplane unit used on the XR4 but did receive unique alloy wheels. A five-door version was added soon thereafter. A four-wheel-drive estate became available with this drive train at the 1986 Geneva Motor Show, but with Ghia rather than XR4x4 badging. This version was better equipped and without the sporting edge of the hatchbacks, and was also available with an automatic transmission. The four-wheel drive allowed for an extra margin of security on slick or snowy roads, while retaining the car's rear-wheel-drive comportment.

The original rear-wheel-drive XR4 was quickly taken out of production after the XR4x4 arrived. The XR4x4 originally came equipped with the 2.8-litre Cologne V6 engine using the same Bosch K-Jetronic mechanical injection system used since 1977 in the Granada, and since 1981 in the Capri, but it was replaced in 1989 by the new more efficient 2.9-litre Cologne V6 engine, with electronic fuel injection. The 2.0-litre four-cylinder engine also became available with the four-wheel-drive system after the 1987 facelift.

== 1987 facelift ==
In February 1987, a restyled Sierra was launched for the 1988 model year and a four-door saloon version was added to the range – this was marketed as the Sierra Sapphire on the UK market. The front end was completely revised, with the biggest difference being the indicators now positioned above the bumper and to the side of a new headlight design. While the grille again remained blanked off, the UK, Irish, and South African versions of the newly introduced saloon version featured a unique shallow black grille between the headlights. That apart, all specifications of the Sierra now shared a common front end, unlike the original line-up. The side windows were made slightly larger with the corners made sharper to increase outward vision. The rear lights were replaced with slimmer but wider models containing separate stop lamps. The saloon got similar rear lights to the revised hatchbacks, though not interchangeable. The rear end of the estate did not change during the Sierra's lifespan. The interior was slightly modernized.

Also new to the range was a new 1.8-litre "lean burn" petrol engine, which proved to be one of the most popular choices in the Sierra range.

The XR4x4 was now based on the five-door hatchback body style and featured different front and rear body-coloured bumper styling, along with wider side rubbing strips. The RS Cosworth, from January 1988, was now based on the newly introduced saloon body style and featured another style of front bumper as well as the black grille which was found only on UK versions of the saloon bodystyle. The RS Cosworth received more power and four-wheel drive from January 1990. In addition, a roller cam engine was added in 1987 to prevent excessive wear to the cam.

From 1988, a pickup called the P100 was produced in Portugal using the Sierra cab and engines, replacing the previous Cortina/Taunus-related model.

=== 1990 and later updates ===
The Sierra and Sapphire continued to be given minor updates for the remaining years of production. The 1990 model year cars featured new smoked rear lamp lenses and a general upgrade to equipment levels across the range. By the 1991 model year, 1.6L CVH, 1.8 CVH and 2.0L DOHC petrol models were available with the option of a catalytic converter, before their adoption became compulsory at the end of 1992 - the non-catalysed 1.6L cars marked the final usage of the venerable Pinto engine in a Ford of Europe passenger car (it continued to be used in the Ford Transit for several more years), before it was finally dropped during 1992.

For the 1992 model year - the Sierra's final full year in production before the launch of the Ford Mondeo, the dashboard was updated with a new instrument surround that mirrored the look of the new-generation Escort and Orion. The "low-series" instrument cluster was dropped — all trim levels now used the "high-series" version, with an analogue clock replacing the tachometer on base specification models. Mid 1992 saw the final updates, with new steering wheels, updated equipment levels and the introduction of run-out models such as the "Azure" and "Chausseur". The final European made Sierras rolled off the production line in December 1992 as the Genk factory was switched over to Mondeo production.

== Bodystyles ==
The switch to the Sierra from the Cortina and Taunus was the second time that Ford had changed its saloon-based line-up into a hatchback-based one following the launch of the Escort Mark III in 1980, and before the introduction of the Scorpio (known as the Granada Mark III in the UK and Ireland) in 1985. However, like the Cortina and Taunus before it, the Sierra was available as an estate.

The company launched the Ford Orion in 1983 to fill the gap in the saloon range left by the Cortina. Ford found that customers were more attached to the idea of a saloon than they had expected, and this was further addressed in 1987 by the production of a saloon version of the Sierra. In the UK, this model was called the Ford Sierra Sapphire. This differed from the other Sierra models in having a traditional black grille, which appeared only in right hand drive markets.

During the life of the car, two different styles of 3-door body were used; one with two pillars rear of the door, looking very much like a modified 5-door frame, as used on the high-performance XR4i; and a one-pillar design used on standard-performance 3-door hatchbacks and also at the other end of the scale as the basis for the very high-performance RS Cosworth.

At the time of the car's launch, both styles were already envisaged, and a demonstration model with one style on either side was displayed at a Sierra design exhibition at the Victoria and Albert Museum in London, but the one-pillar design was not launched until 1984. The three-door Sierra was later dropped in the UK after just two years, only to be revived for the Cosworth version. Production of the 3-door Sierra continued in continental Europe, including after the Sierra range was given a facelift in 1987, but this was never offered in the UK. After 1987, the Cosworth used the four-door saloon body style instead.

A 5-door van based on the estate, known as the Sierra Van, was introduced in 1984, which, unlike similar car-derived vans, retained its side windows. The back seat was removed and the metal cargo floor was extended towards the front seats. A diesel engine and a limited choice of petrol engines were available for the Van. This variant was never sold in the UK, although some were produced in right-hand-drive for the Irish market.

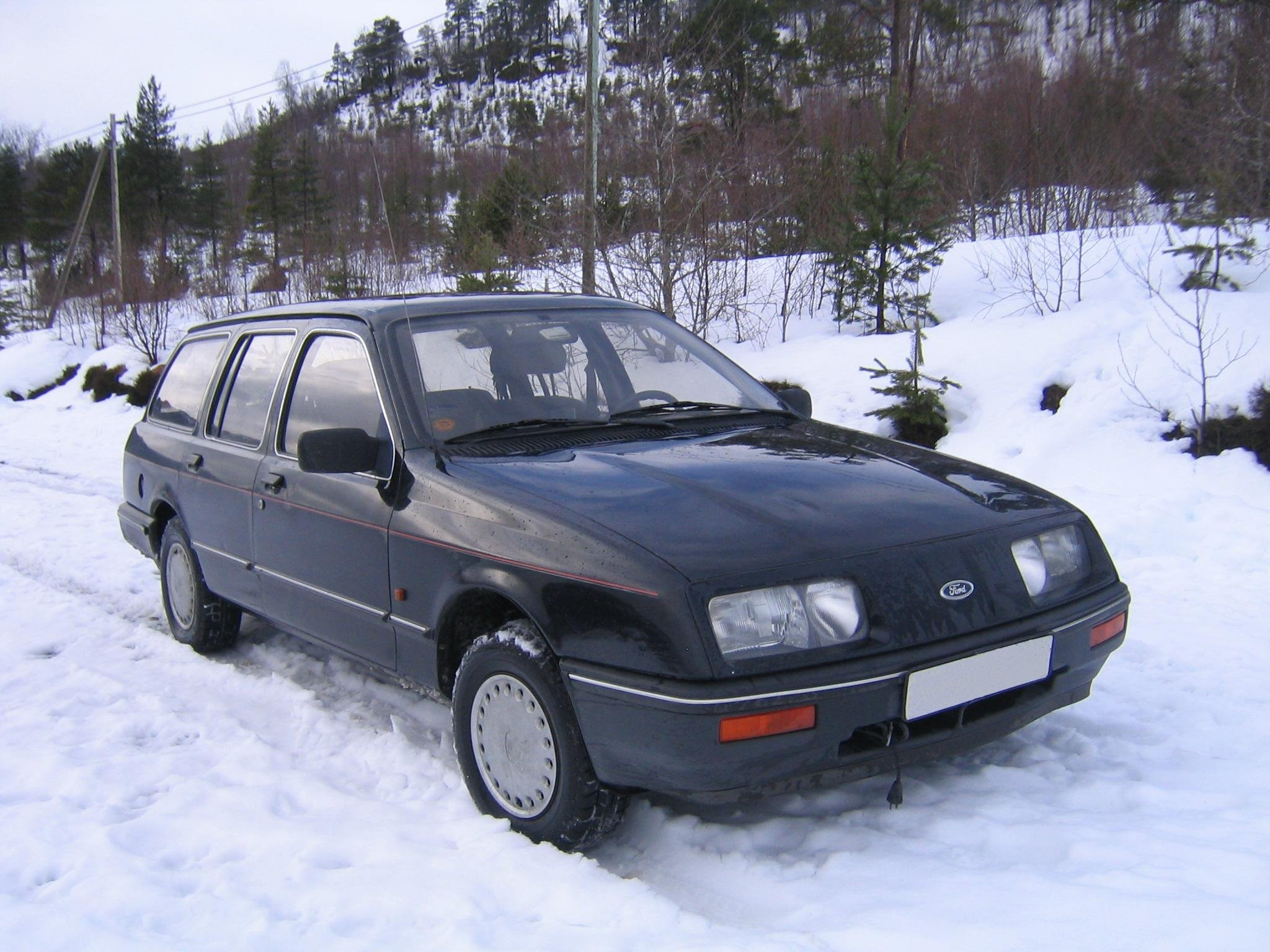
Ford Sierra estate, with original aero design, and front panel of higher-specification models

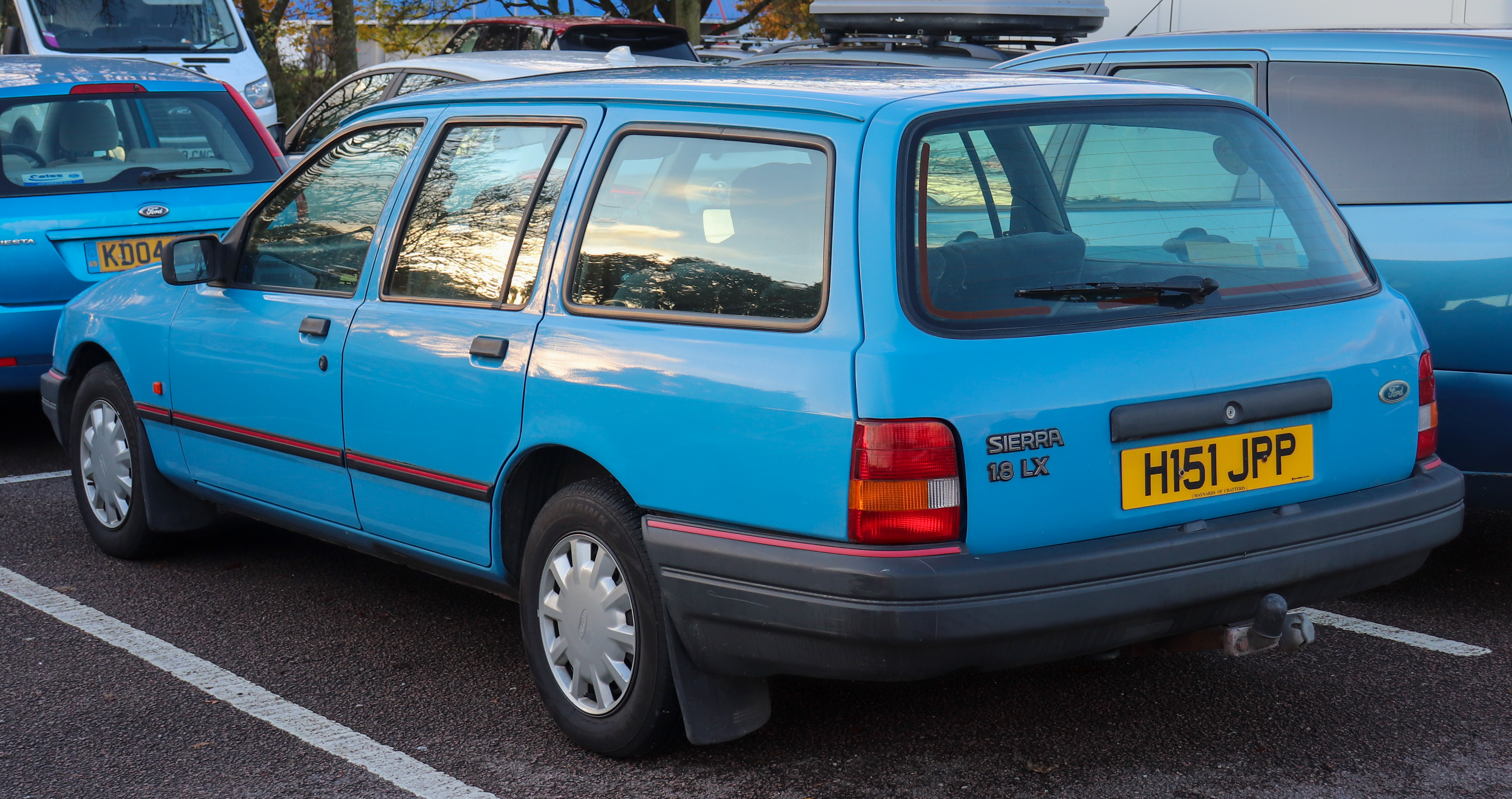
1991 Ford Sierra LX Estate 1.8 (United Kingdom)

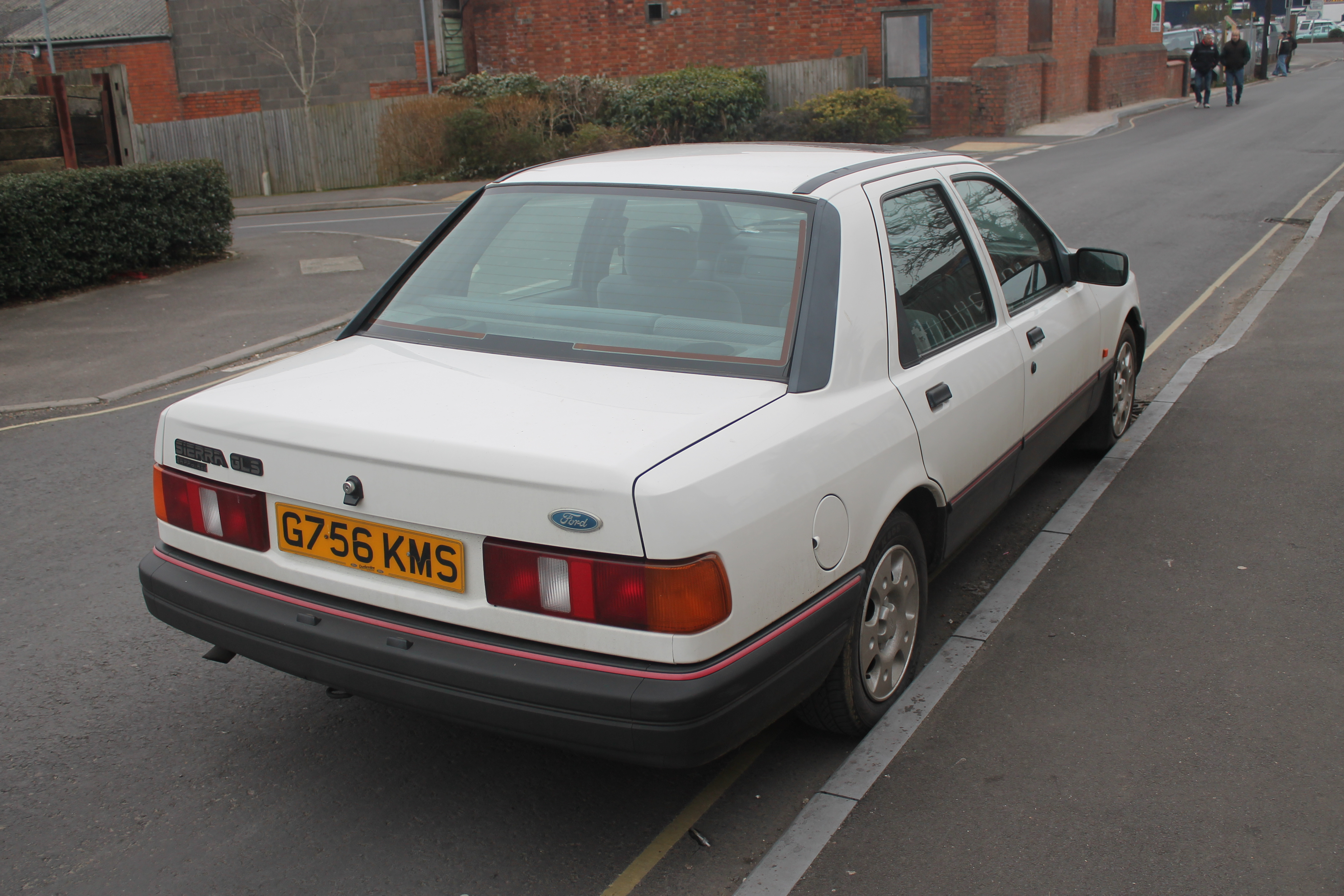
1989 Ford Sierra Sapphire GLS, with earlier red/white/amber rear lights (United Kingdom)

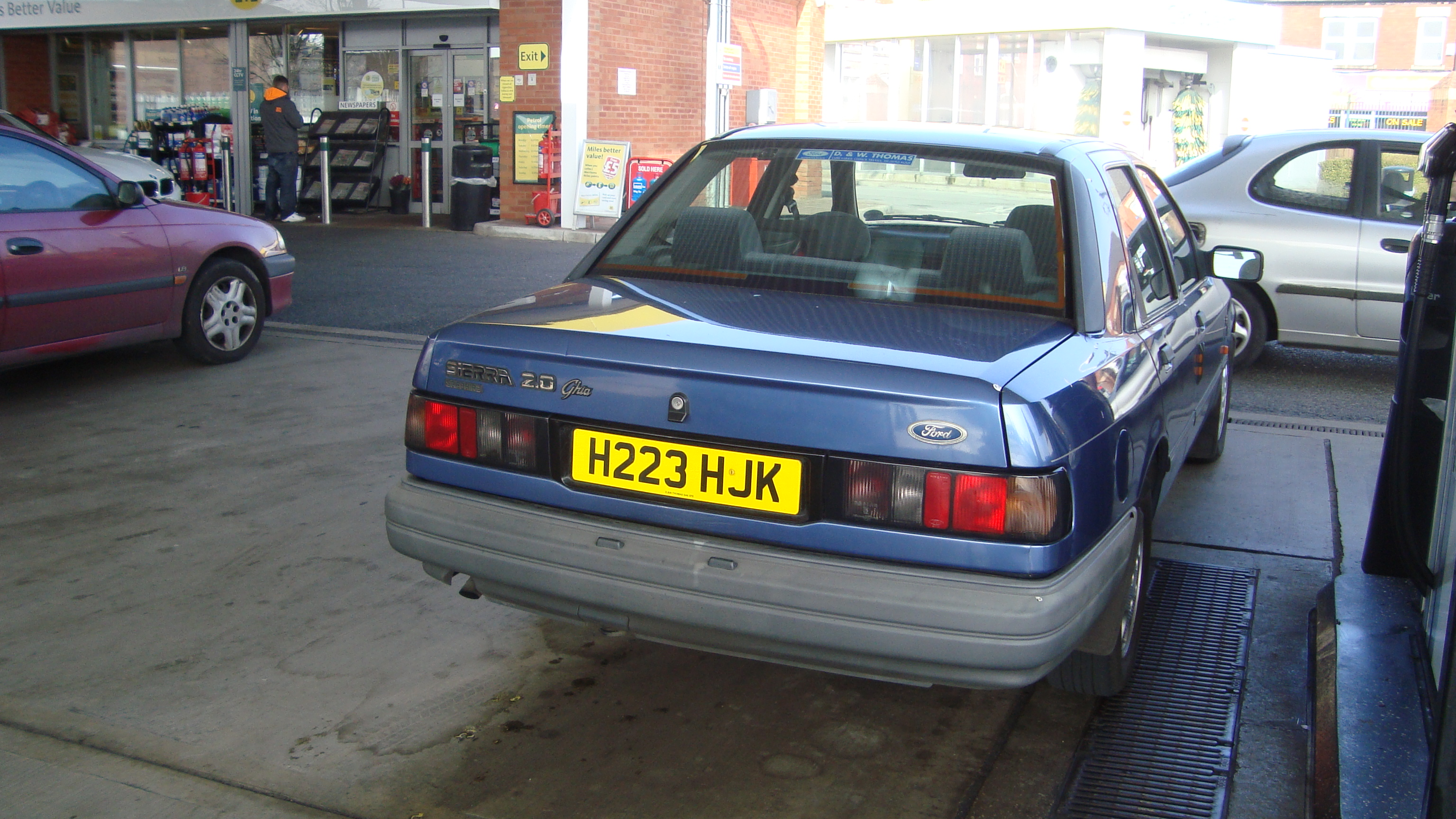
1991 Ford Sierra Sapphire 2.0 Ghia Automatic, showing the smoked rear lights in use from 1990–1993 (United Kingdom)

== Versions ==
Photograph	Version	Built from	Built until
	Ford Sierra (Mk I)	1982	1987
	Ford Sierra (Mk II)	1987	1990
	Ford Sierra (Mk II facelifted)	1990	1993

== Sierra model range ==
=== Powertrain Options ===
During its lifetime, the Sierra was available with a wide range of petrol engines:

- 1.3 I4 OHC (1294 cc; 60 PS (44 kW; 59 hp)) Pinto engine;
- 1.6 I4 OHC (1593 cc; 75 PS (55 kW; 74 hp)) Pinto engine, available in standard or economy tune;
- 1.8 I4 OHC (1796 cc; 90 PS (66 kW; 89 hp)) Pinto engine (from 1985);
- 1.8 I4 OHC (1769 cc; 87 PS (64 kW; 86 hp)) CVH Engine (from 06/1988);
- 2.0 I4 OHC (1998 cc; 105 PS (77 kW; 104 hp)) Pinto engine;
- 2.0i I4 OHC (1993 cc; 115 PS (85 kW; 113 hp)) Pinto engine with fuel injection (from 1985);
- 2.0i I4 DOHC (1998 cc; 120 PS (88 kW; 118 hp)) DOHC engine (from 1989);
- 2.0i I4 DOHC 16V Turbo (1993 cc; 204 PS (150 kW; 201 hp)) DOHC engine, YB Turbo (RS Cosworth, 1986–1987);
- 2.0i I4 DOHC 16V Turbo (1993 cc; 227 PS (167 kW; 224 hp)) DOHC engine, YB Turbo (RS500 Cosworth, 1987);
- 2.0 V6 (1999 cc; 90 PS (66 kW; 89 hp)) Cologne V6 engine;
- 2.3 V6 (2294 cc; 114 PS (84 kW; 112 hp)) Cologne V6 engine;
- 2.8i V6 (2792 cc; 150 PS (110 kW; 148 hp)) Cologne V6 engine (XR4i, 1983–1985, XR4x4 1985–1987)
- 2.9i V6 (2935 cc; 150 PS (110 kW; 148 hp)) Cologne V6 engine (XR4x4, from 1987)

Two diesel engines were available:

- 2.3 I4 D (2304 cc, 67 PS (49 kW; 66 hp)) Peugeot Diesel engine (1982–1989);
- 1.8 I4 TD (1753 cc; 75 PS (55 kW; 74 hp)) Endura-D engine (from 1990)

1300, 1600, and 2000 engines all had a 4-speed manual gearbox; a 5-speed manual gearbox was optional with 1600 and 2000 engines, and standard with the 1600 Economy engine, the 2300 and 2300 Diesel. An optional 3-speed automatic transmission was available with 1600, 2000 and 2300 engines.

The 2.0 V6 and 2.3 V6 versions of the Sierra were dropped at the end of 1985 and the 1.3-litre was discontinued in 1986. A carburetted 1.8 and a fuel-injected 2.0-litre petrol engine were added at Geneva 1985. In 1990, the 2.3-litre diesel was replaced by a 1.8-litre turbodiesel. The turbocharged 2-litre RS Cosworth engine featured on three versions of the Sierra; the three-door rear-wheel-drive hatchback, the rear-wheel-drive saloon, and the four-wheel-drive saloon.

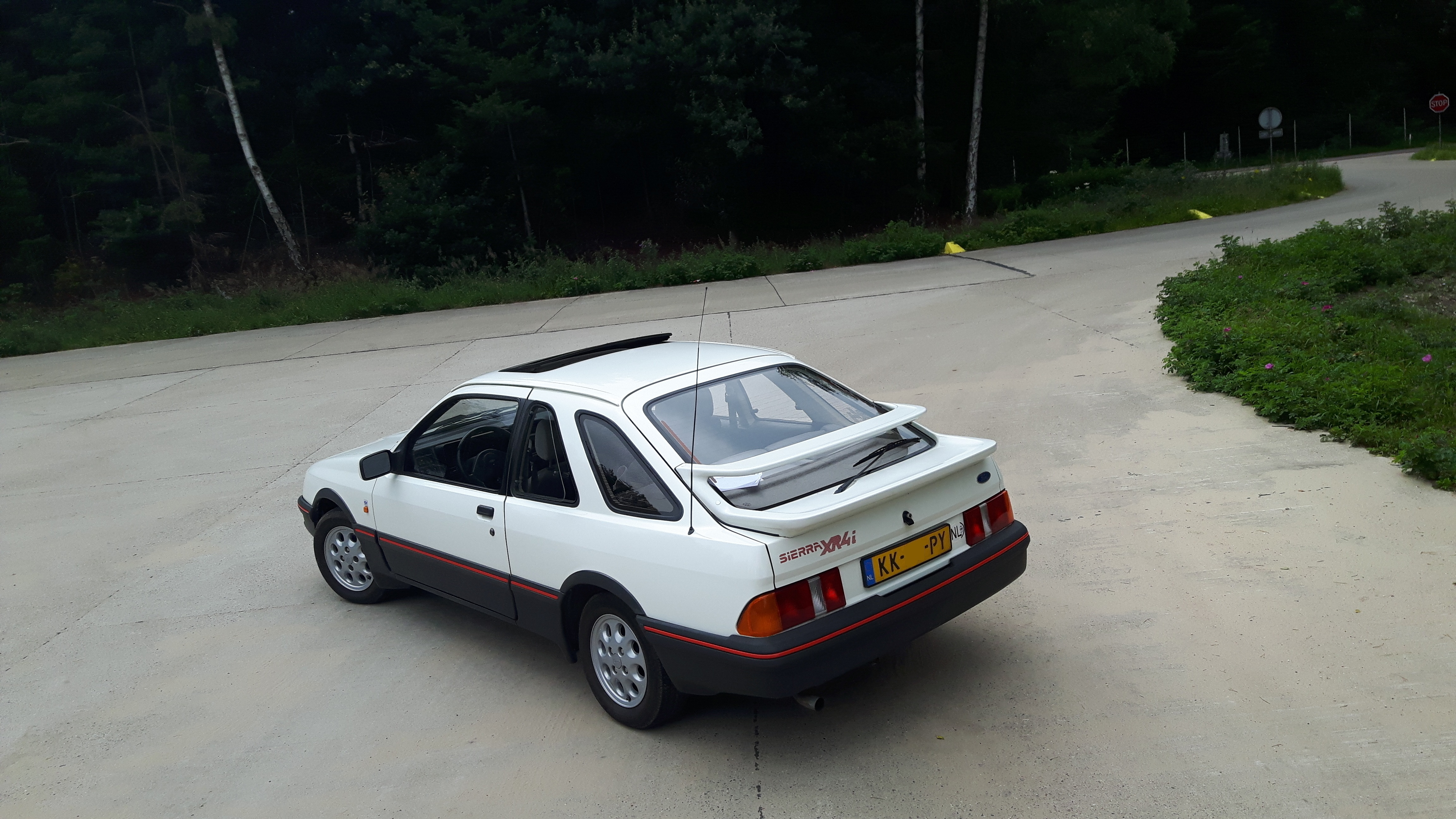
The Sierra XR4i with its bi-plane rear spoiler

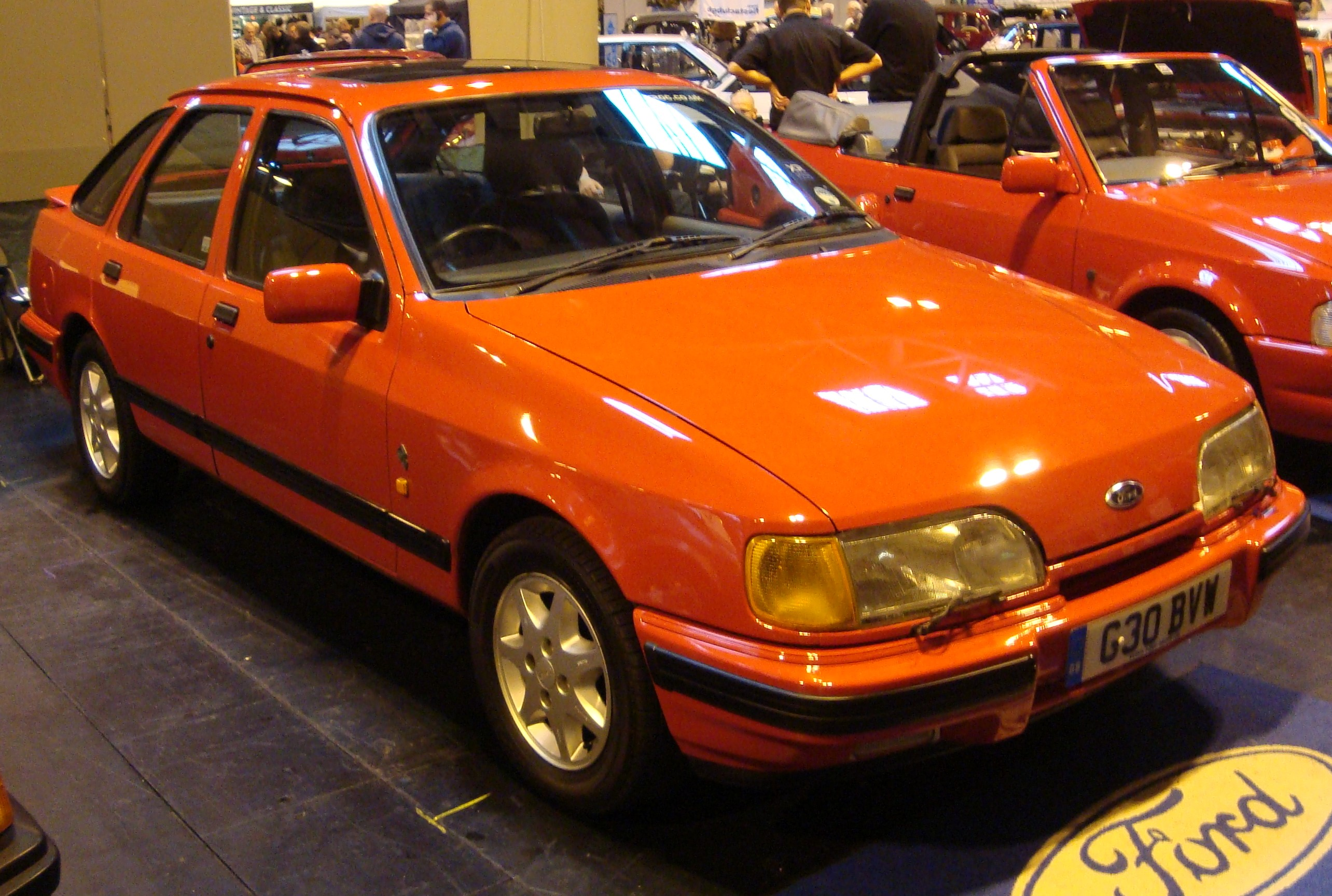
Ford Sierra XR4x4

The sporting model XR4i utilized the 2.8 engine with mechanical fuel injection (Bosch K Jetronic) coupled to rear-wheel drive (1983–1985) and to four-wheel-drive as XR4x4 (1985–1987). There were visual differences and alterations between the XR4i and XR4x4, such as coloured bumpers, the removal of the 'biplane' rear wing and alloy wheels as seen on the Ford Escort RS Turbo Series 1. There was also a 2.8-litre Ghia Estate in some markets, and from 1985 until 1987 Swiss customers could buy rear-wheel-drive 2.8-litre powered GL and Ghia models with five-door hatchback or estate bodywork. The Swiss (and Swedish) market engines produced marginally less power, as those countries had particularly stringent emissions standards. Output was 148 PS (109 kW) in 1985 and 145 PS (107 kW) in 1986. In the Mark II Sierras the 2.8 Cologne engine was replaced by a 2.9-litre version. Both the 2.8/2.9-litre engines gave 150 PS in uncatalyzed trim.

The well known Cosworth model was powered by a turbocharged 16-valve 4-cylinder engine known as the 'YB' which was based on the Ford Pinto block. The Ford Sierra RS Cosworth was introduced in 1986 as a three-door hatchback, with a 2-litre DOHC turbo engine producing 204 PS (150 kW; 201 hp) and a top speed of 150 m.p.h. – a speed normally found only in sports cars from prestige brands like Ferrari and Porsche, at much higher prices as well as with less practicality. At the time Ford wanted to compete in Group-A touring cars and therefore eligible to produce a limited run of 10% of the initial production, therefore this would be 500 cars. This was known as an 'evolution' model. Ford employed Tickford to help with the development. The Sierra RS500 as it was known sported a small additional rear spoiler, and larger front chin spoiler, extra cooling ducts for the engine, brakes, and intercooler. The placement of the additional cooling ducts is where the foglights seen on the previous Sierra RS Cosworth had an option to remove and refit the aforementioned foglights. A larger turbocharger and intercooler was fitted along with an extra set of injectors, so instead of the standard four injectors it was built with eight, although in road trim these extra injectors did not function. These modifications produced 227 PS (167 kW; 224 hp) in road trim and around 550 hp (410 kW) in race trim. They were very successful in motorsport and are highly tunable road cars with a very large following.

In 1987, Ford introduced a four-door saloon (marketed in the UK as the Sierra Sapphire), which was sold alongside the hatchback and estate until the Sierra was replaced by the Mondeo in early 1993. The last Sierra rolled off the production line in December 1992.

The Sierra Cosworth line-up switched to a saloon body style with a four-door arrangement in January 1988, aptly named the 'Sapphire', again with rear-wheel drive, before the four-wheel-drive version replaced it two years later. The Sierra Sapphire RS Cosworth was based on the second-generation variant of the Sierra model, having a different front and rear fascia compared to the first-generation Sierra. The same turbocharged 2-litre Cosworth YB engine found itself present in the Sapphire RS Cosworth as found with the three-door Sierra.

== Sierras outside Europe ==
=== South Africa ===
In South Africa, the Sierra range featured both the five-door hatchback and station wagon bodies and production began at the Silverton (Pretoria) plant in January 1983. The restyled Sierra range differed from its European equivalent by featuring the traditional grille of the Sierra Sapphire saloon on the hatchback and wagon, though later, the grille would feature on these models in Europe. The saloon, introduced in South Africa only in the second quarter of 1989, was known simply as the "Ford Sapphire".

Versions sold in South Africa were available with the 1.6 (Kent) and 2.0 (Pinto) four-cylinders, 2.3 V6 (Cologne) or 3.0-litre V6 (Essex) petrol engines. While the Cortina MkV in South Africa had retained the old 3.0 V6 Essex engine, the Sierra was initially given the new 2.3 V6 Cologne motor, this being fitted to the top-of-the-line model only. However, owing to the low cost of petrol, and the popularity of the old Cortina XR6, a Sierra XR6 was later launched, featuring the old Essex, initially producing 103 kW (138 hp).

Versions were LX, GL, and GLX; the Ghia trim level was not available for the South African market except on the Ford Sapphire, the saloon version.

As the 2.8/2.9 Cologne was never launched in South Africa, the venerable and popular Essex V6 remained the best normal production engine fitted to the Sierra. At the top of the range, the 2.3 GLS quickly gave way to a 3.0 GLX flagship model (producing less power but more torque than the XR6) and that was the end of the Cologne in South Africa, even the station wagon receiving the 3.0 V6 Essex. By 1985, the Sierra had become the largest Ford model in this market, following the demise of the Granada.

Towards the end of its production life, the Essex was modified again – the standard carburetted version was tuned to produce 110 kW (150 PS; 148 hp) from 1991 to 1993, while a fuel-injected version was available from 1992 to 1993. Fitted to the Sierra as the 3.0i RS (replacing the XR6) and to the Sapphire saloon as the Sapphire Ghia (replacing the 3.0 GLX), the fuel-injected Essex put out around 117 kW (157 hp) and was the most powerful Sierra/Sapphire version sold in South Africa, excluding the small number of XR8s built for homologation purposes. At the end of production a limited edition of 150 vehicles designated as 3.0i RS which based on the saloon (Sapphire) body was produced with some slight engine tweaks which resulted in a power output of 125 kW (170 PS; 168 hp). This vehicle was also fitted with the ATE ABS system as was customary only on the Sapphire GHIA models at the time. These limited-edition vehicles were available in only two colours, namely red and white.

Uniquely, the South African market also saw the introduction of a 5.0-litre XR8 between June 1984 and 1988. A limited number of 250 Sierras were made for the purposes of homologation, as this model was the premier Ford used in Group-A racing. The XR8 was fitted with the 302 ci engine from the US Ford Mustang, and the Borg Warner T5 heavy-duty transmission. Front brakes were AP Racing four-piston calipers on 280 mm discs. Maximum power is 209 PS (154 kW) and a top speed of 225 km/h (140 mph) was claimed. The XR8 is easily recognized by having four cooling slats between the headlights, whereas lesser versions were sold with the original smooth front.

The 1.6 Kent continued almost unchanged during the 9-year life of the Sierra/Sapphire, while the 2.0 Cologne was revised several times, being fitted to the Sierra 2.0 GL and GLE and later to the stripped down Sierra 2.0 LX and Sapphire 2.0 GL and GLE models. It eventually even received fuel injection in the Sapphire 2.0GLi, boosting the power from 77 kW (103 hp) to 85 kW (114 hp).

The Sierra was eventually replaced in South Africa by the Telstar in 1993. Samcor, which assembled Ford models under licence after Ford had divested from the country, was already assembling the smaller Laser and Meteor, alongside the Mazda 323, on which they were based, as well as a facelifted earlier version of the Mazda 626. The Telstar was finally replaced by the Mondeo in 1998.

=== New Zealand ===
Whereas British buyers rued the absence of a saloon version of the Sierra, in New Zealand it was the absence of an estate that customers missed, when Ford New Zealand replaced the Cortina with the Ford Telstar range in 1983, relying on stocks of the Cortina wagon in the interim. In order to fill the gap in the market, Ford introduced the Sierra wagon in 1984. This was in spite of opposition at Ford Asia Pacific and from the Detroit headquarters. However, as Ford New Zealand was able to meet orders for alloy wheels for export to Australia and Europe, it was able to price the Sierra competitively with the Telstar. This was assembled locally from imported CKD ("completely knocked down") kits, with assembly beginning in March 1984, before the model was released in June of that year. The wagon was offered in 1.6- (base) and 2.0-litre "L" and "Ghia" models initially, and proved to be a strong seller. The then Prime Minister, Sir Robert Muldoon, used a Sierra as his personal transport, and would drive it to his office in the government building known as the Beehive. However, this was a specially imported one-off hatchback version, which replaced his Triumph 2000. New Zealand was the only market in the world where both the Telstar and the Sierra were offered next to each other.

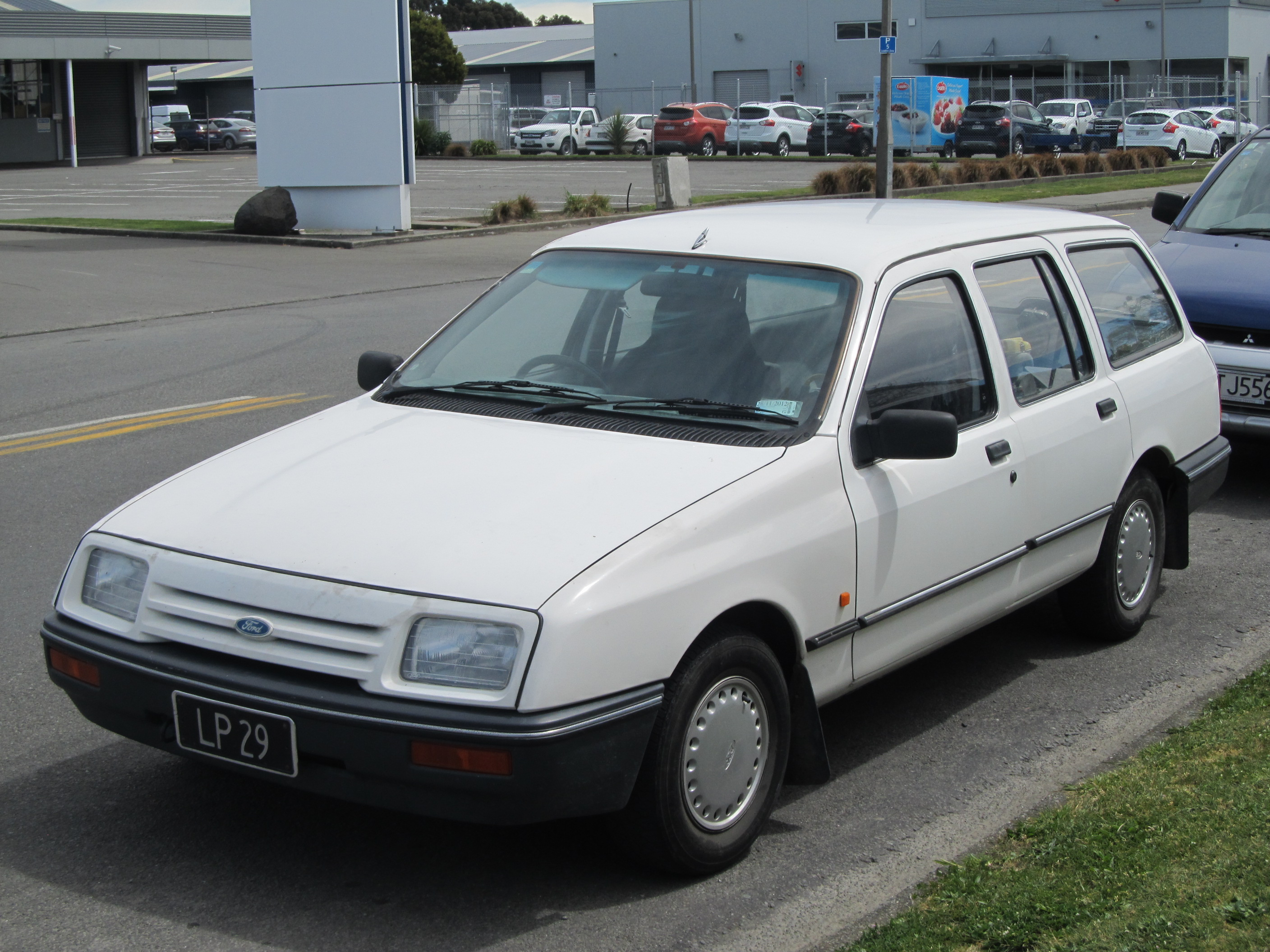
1984 Ford Sierra L Wagon (New Zealand), assembled locally

A first facelift c. 1985 aligned the frontal appearance of all models and the three-speed automatic option was replaced by Ford’s new A4LD four-speed unit. A 1987 facelift again changed frontal appearance, among other updates. In addition, the range was rationalized to the single L trim level, due to the increased German content in the Sierra Ghia, which would incur a higher rate of import duty. In one month that year, single estate model line was the country's top-selling car range. A few fully built-up 2.3 V6 five-doors and XR4i three-doors were also imported from 1984.

However, Ford cancelled the Sierra in 1988 once Mazda, which developed the Telstar, could offer a wagon. The Telstar wagon, while popular, never reached the Sierra's heights, especially its competition successes overseas. Further reasons could be customers' knowledge of the Telstar's Japanese roots, and that the equivalent Mazda 626 wagon offered a considerably longer warranty at a similar price.

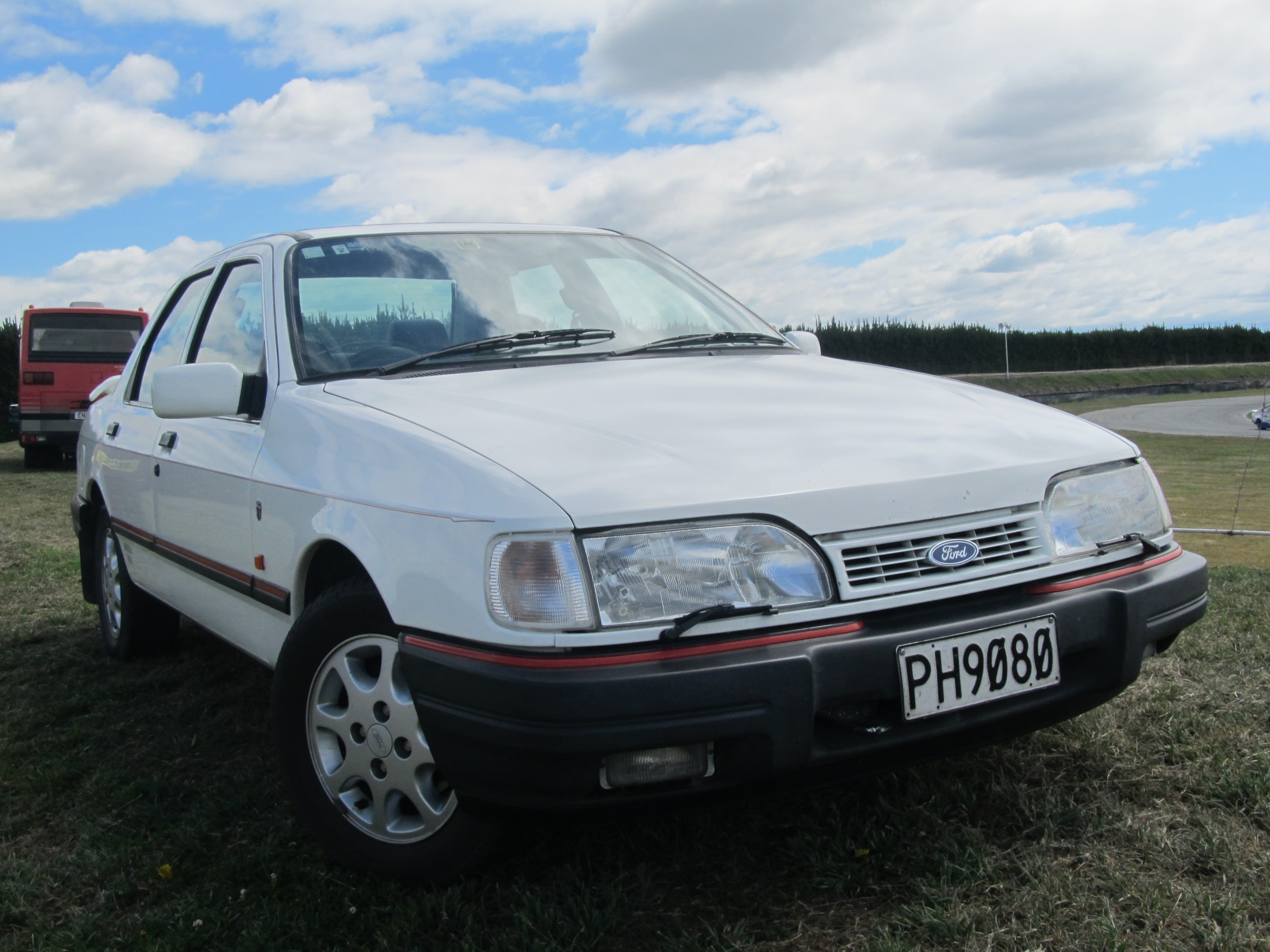
1990 Ford Sierra Sapphire (New Zealand), imported CBU from Belgium

Relative rejection of the Telstar forced Ford to import completely built-up (CBU) premium models built in Genk, Belgium from 1990: the Sierra 2.0 GLX Wagon, the Sierra Sapphire 2.0 Ghia and the XR4×4 were part of this range. The advertising copy read "Introducing the new car that needs no introduction". However, a relatively high price did not help – the Wagon began at over NZ$31,000 – and production errors in the launch brochure showed cars with no steering wheels. Furthermore, any marketing boosts Ford could have gained through Group A touring car racing were over with the Escort Cosworth becoming the company's standard-bearer in competition (and the Escort, meanwhile, was absent from the New Zealand market).

The Sierra was withdrawn from the New Zealand market in 1992, and it was another five years before its European successor the Mondeo arrived there. Sierra Cosworths remain sought-after performance cars.

By contrast, the Sierra was never sold in Australia, as there was less demand for a medium-sized wagon than in New Zealand; it was only with the debut of the Mondeo in 1995 that Ford Australia offered one, its first since the demise of the British-sourced TF Cortina. However, the RS Cosworth/RS500 was used in the Australian Touring Car Championships from the late-1980s and early-1990s.

=== Argentina ===
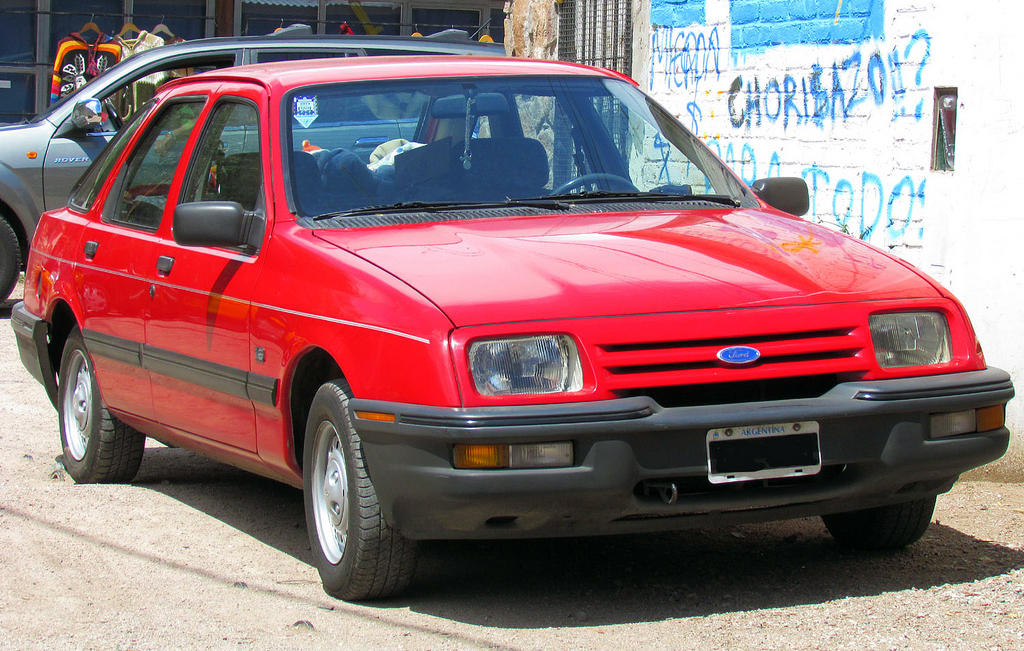
1987 Ford Sierra 1.6 GL (Argentina)

In Argentina, the Sierra was offered as a five-door hatchback beginning in the summer of 1984. An estate body style was added in September 1985. The sporting XR4, with three-door bodywork arrived a couple of months after the original introduction. The facelifted post-1987 model did not reach the Argentinian market, where the range continued with a Merkur XR4Ti-like grille until 1991 for XR4 and 1992 for five-door models, when it was replaced by the Volkswagen Santana-based Galaxy. Argentinian Sierras can be distinguished by a more sculpted front bumper with an extra cooling inlet.

The 1.6L was offered in GL model only, while the LX, Ghia, Ghia S/SX, and XR4 were available with a 2.3-litre inline-four with some differences in specs. Both engines, as for the preceding Taunus TC3, were from the "Pinto" family. The power ranged between 75 PS (55 kW) for the 1.6 and 120 PS (88 kW) for the XR4 and later Ghia S versions. Some Ghia models also featured automatic transmission as an optional. The estate was called the Sierra Rural. Ford had previously used the name "Rural" for estates in Argentina, such as the Taunus, in a similar way to "Turnier" in Germany.

The GL model was the base model replaced by the LX with the same equipment. The XR4 was eventually complemented by the five-door Ghia S/SX.

=== Venezuela ===
In Venezuela the locally assembled Ford Sierra was launched in 1985, the 2.8 L V6 engine being standard on versions sold there, including the 5 door hatchback (280 LS and 280ES) and 3 door hatchback (XR4i and 280GT) as well as the 5-door estate (Ranchera). In 1990, a face-lifted version of the Sierra, powered by the 2.9 L V6 engine was offered as both a hatchback and a saloon, the latter being known as the Sierra 300 Sapphire, although unlike the Sapphire in other markets it had a blanked-off grille. Also launched in Venezuela was the XR6i.

=== North America ===
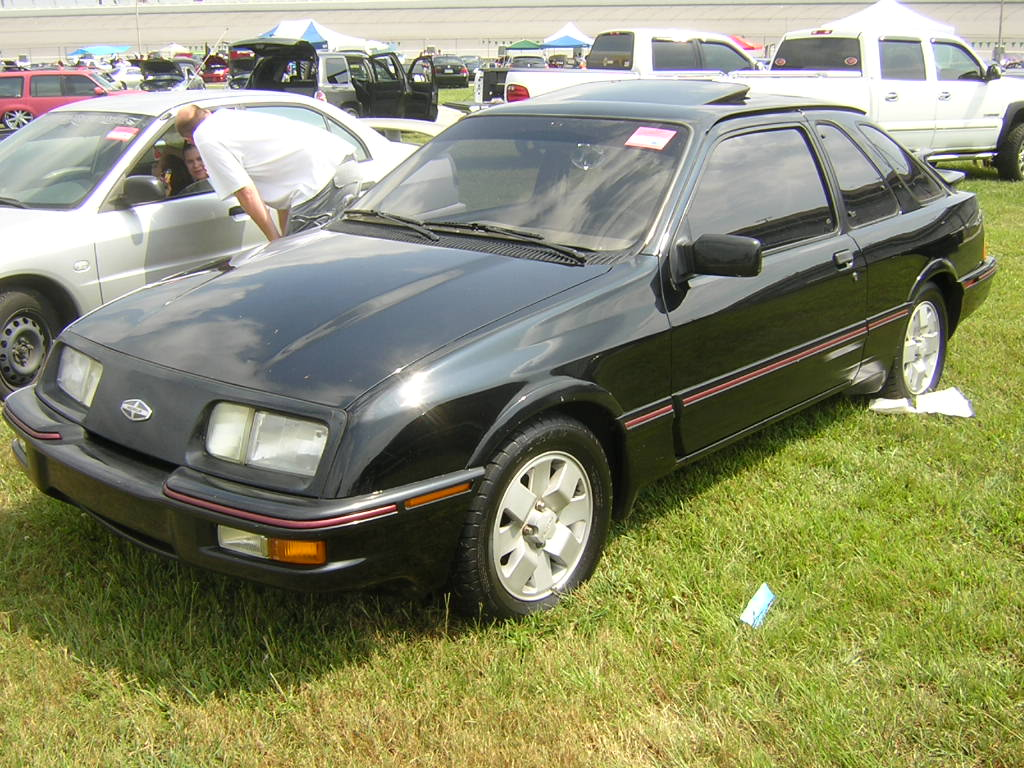
1985 Merkur XR4Ti, showing front panel also used by pre-facelift Ghia models, and the three-door XR4's unusual combination of the long side doors from a three-door model and the five-door's rear quarterlight

To market the Sierra in North America, Ford created the Merkur brand, sold through its Lincoln-Mercury dealer network as a sub-brand intended to attract buyers of European luxury cars. The inaugural Merkur model line was the Merkur XR4Ti, a Karmann-manufactured variant of the Sierra XR4i. In a major change, the 2.8 L V6 of the XR4i was replaced by a turbocharged 2.3 L SOHC inline-4; along with adding nearly 30 hp, the change gave the XR4Ti drivetrain commonality with the Ford Mustang SVO and the Ford Thunderbird Turbo Coupe. The primary difference between the XR4Ti and the Mustang SVO was its lack of an intercooler (added to the SVO during 1985, increasing its output to 205 hp).

In North America, Ford was unable to use the Sierra name on the model line, as General Motors had trademarked the name in 1972, using it for GMC pickup trucks. Additionally, its pronunciation was identical to the Oldsmobile (Cutlass) Ciera (its entry-level midsize car).

In mid-1988, the XR4Ti was joined by the Merkur Scorpio, rebranding its Ford namesake (a longer-wheelbase version of the Sierra) for American sale.

After the 1989 model year, Ford retired both the Merkur XR4Ti and the Merkur Scorpio. During its sale in North America, the XR4Ti was negatively affected by exchange rates between West Germany and the United States, resulting in relatively high pricing. For 1990, the model line faced a potentially costly redesign to comply with passive safety regulations (the addition of airbags, not then required in Europe). In addition, its sale through the Lincoln-Mercury network contrasted sharply with other vehicles sold there (such as the Mercury Cougar and Lincoln Mark VII).

== Mechanicals ==
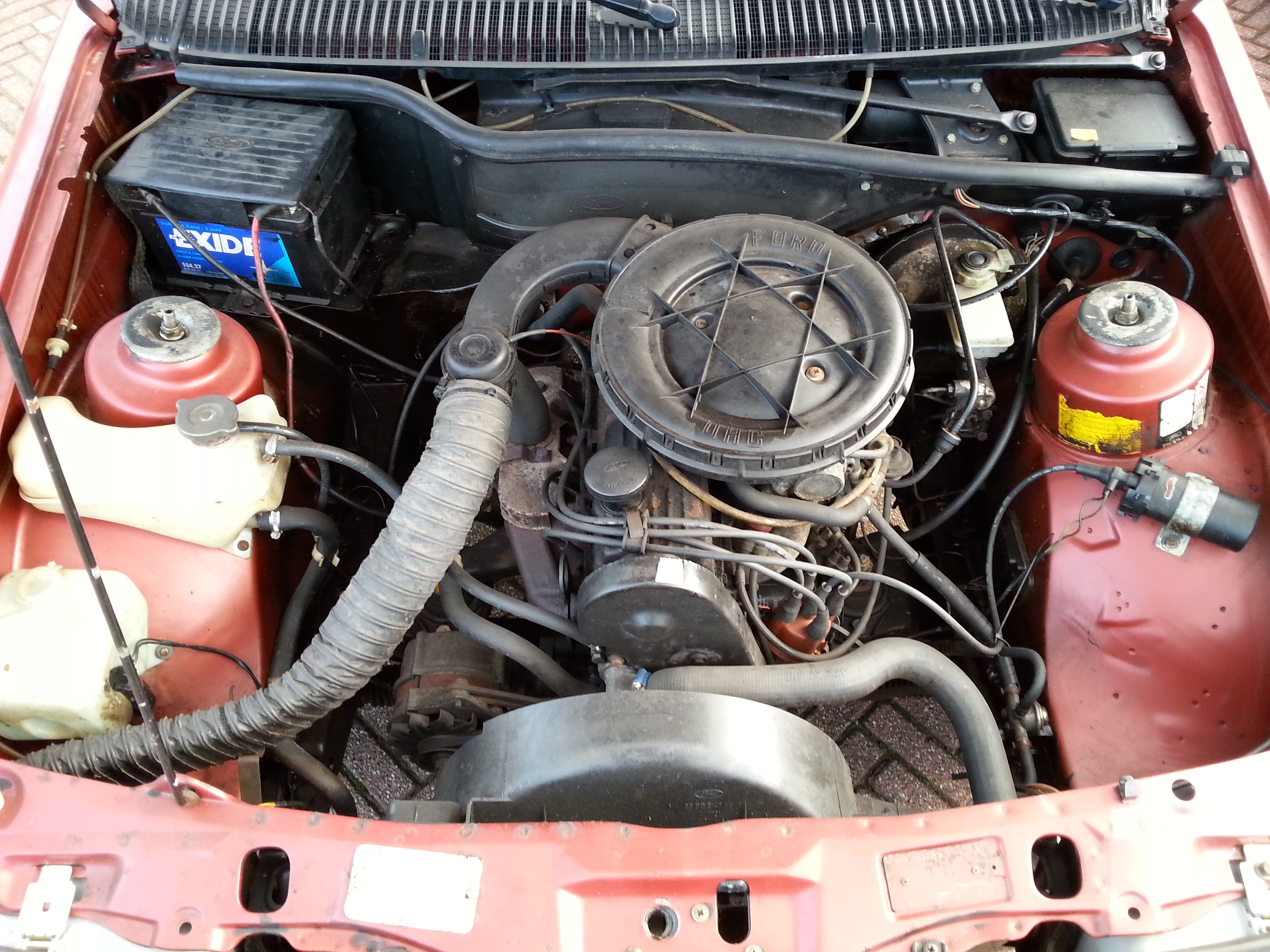
Ford Sierra 1.3 OHC engine

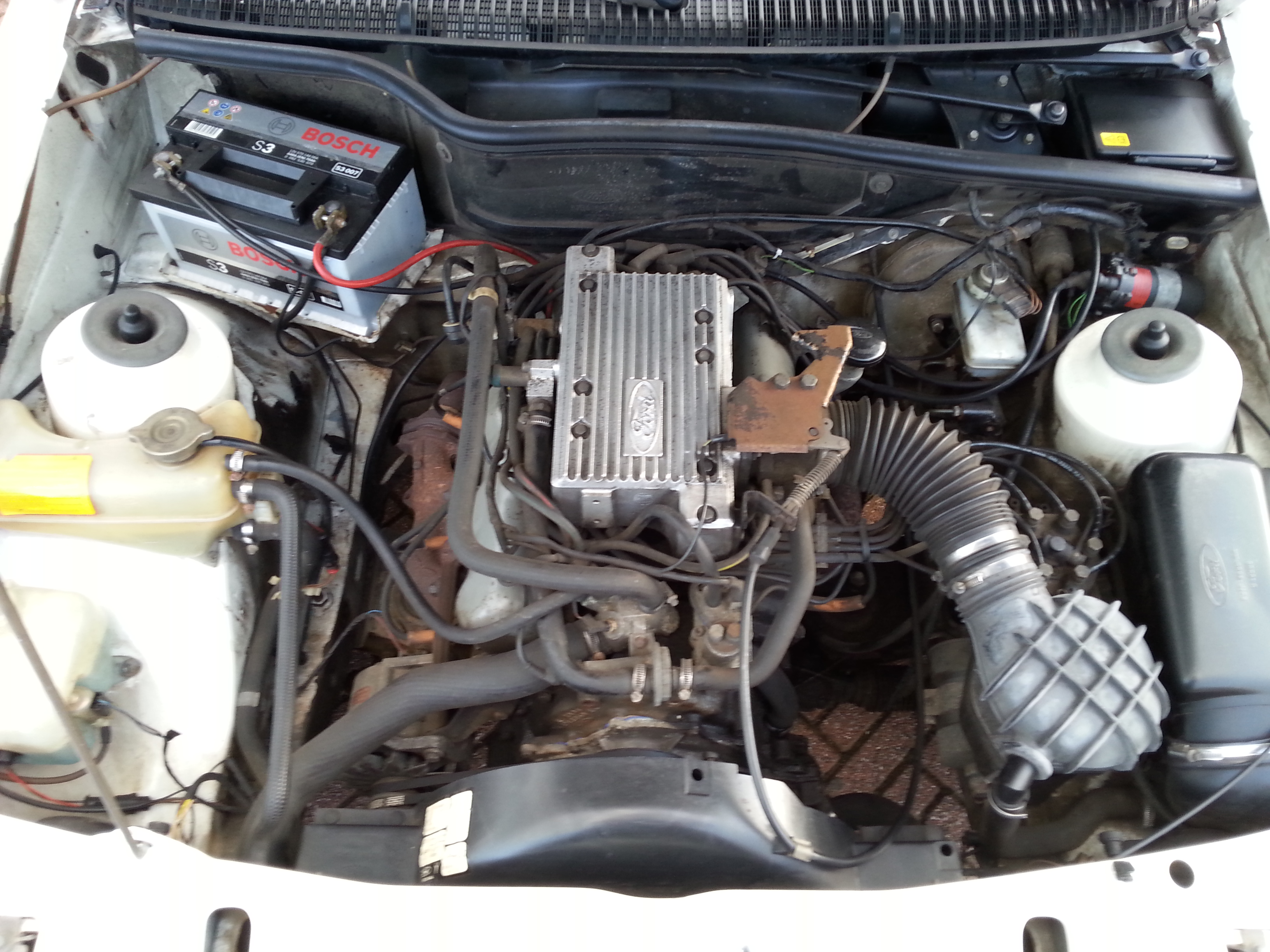
Ford Sierra 2.8i V6 engine (XR4i)

Unlike many of its rivals, the Sierra retained rear-wheel drive, albeit with a modern fully independent rear suspension, departing from the Cortina's live axle.

=== 4-cylinder engines ===
In the beginning the Sierra used engines and transmissions from the Taunus / Cortina. The engines were of two types, the SOHC Ford Pinto engine in 1.3, 1.6, 1.8, and 2.0-litre displacements, and the OHV Cologne V6 engine (in 2.0, 2.3, 2.8, and 2.9-litre capacities). Towards the end of the 1980s owing to tightening emission standards, the Pinto engine began to be phased out, the 1.8-litre in 1988 replaced by a 1.8-litre CVH, the 2.0-litre in 1989, replaced with the Ford I4 DOHC engine. In anticipation of the Euro 1 emission standard (applicable from 1 January 1993), buyers from late 1991 had the option of a 1.6 CVH first seen in the Escort in 1980, described as a "CFi", a single-point fuel injection system with a catalytic converter. Carburettor-fed 1.6 Sierras with no catalytic converter still used the Pinto engine, which remained available through 1992 before stocks ran out at the end of that year. In the UK, Ford allegedly pre-registered any remaining non-catalysed cars to ensure they could still be legally sold beyond 1992.

=== 6-cylinder engines ===
The 2.9 L Cologne engine was available in the Sierra XR4x4 and the Sierra Ghia. Models with the 2.0-litre and Cologne V6 engines had an option of a limited-slip differential. Models built until 1989 used the type 9 gearbox that had been used in the Cortina, with the exception of 2WD Cosworth models that used the T5. The T5 had several variations; most were internal. This was basically the same transmission used in the Ford Mustang. The 0.80 overdrive gears were the weak link. It was later superseded by the MT75 unit (for DOHC, 4X4 and V6 models). All Sierras had rear drum brakes, except sporting models (2.0iS (some), 2.0 GLX & GLS, XR4x4, Sierra Cosworth, other special/sporting models inc 2.0i 4x4) and models with anti-lock brakes. American versions meanwhile were sold only with a 2.3-litre four-cylinder turbocharged version of the Pinto engine.

=== Diesel engines ===
The Sierra also had a diesel option on the engine, namely at launch the 2.3-litre normally aspirated 67 PS (49 kW; 66 hp) Indenor diesel made by Peugeot. This engine was also used in contemporary Granadas and whilst reliable and economical it made an unrefined noisy and very slow vehicle, but remained a popular option for taxi firms. This was later superseded in 1990 by a 1.8 L turbocharged powerplant of Ford's own design which offered better response times and slightly more power. During the Sierra's production run the engine was known both as the Lynx and as the Endura-D, though was further rebranded as the 'Endura-DE' with the release of the second-generation Ford Mondeo.

== Special-edition models ==
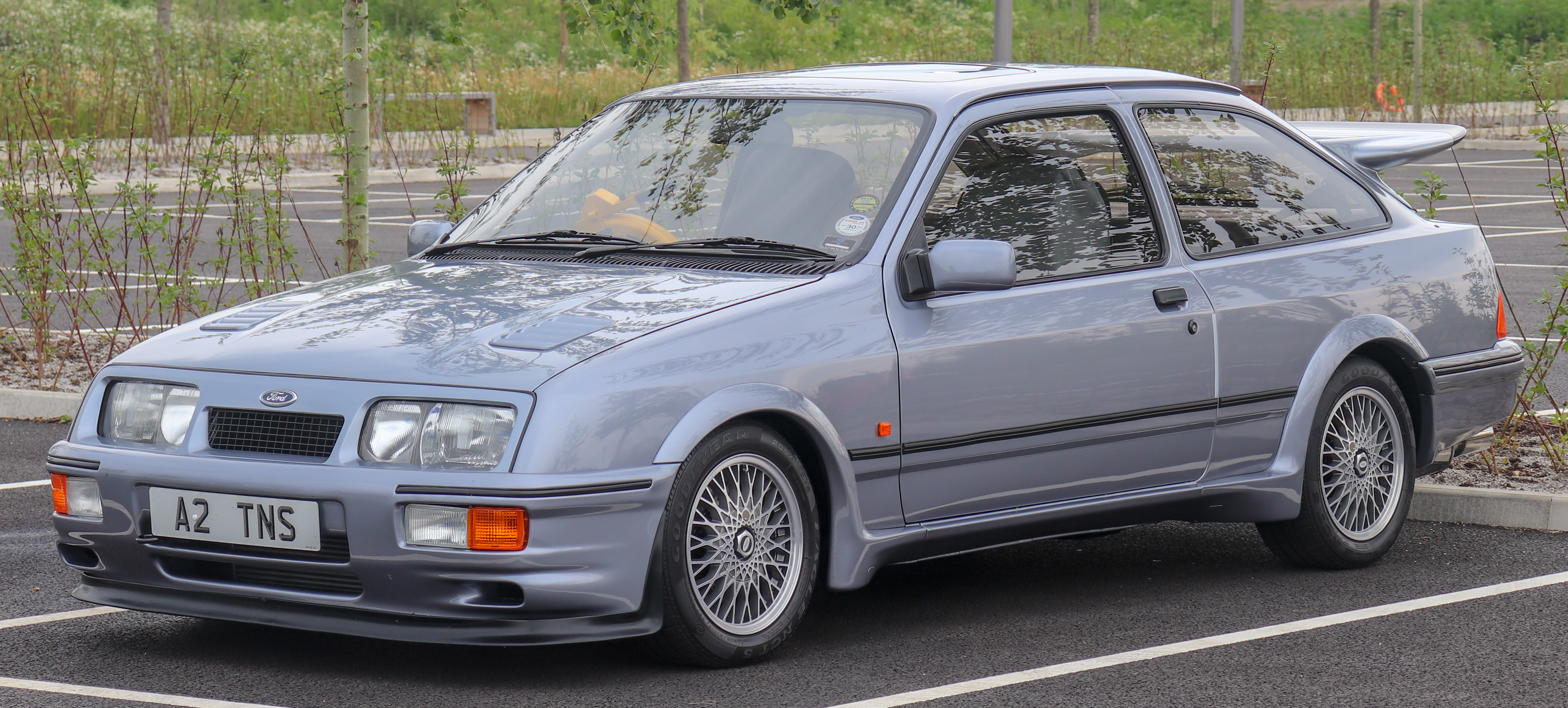
1986 Ford Sierra RS Cosworth

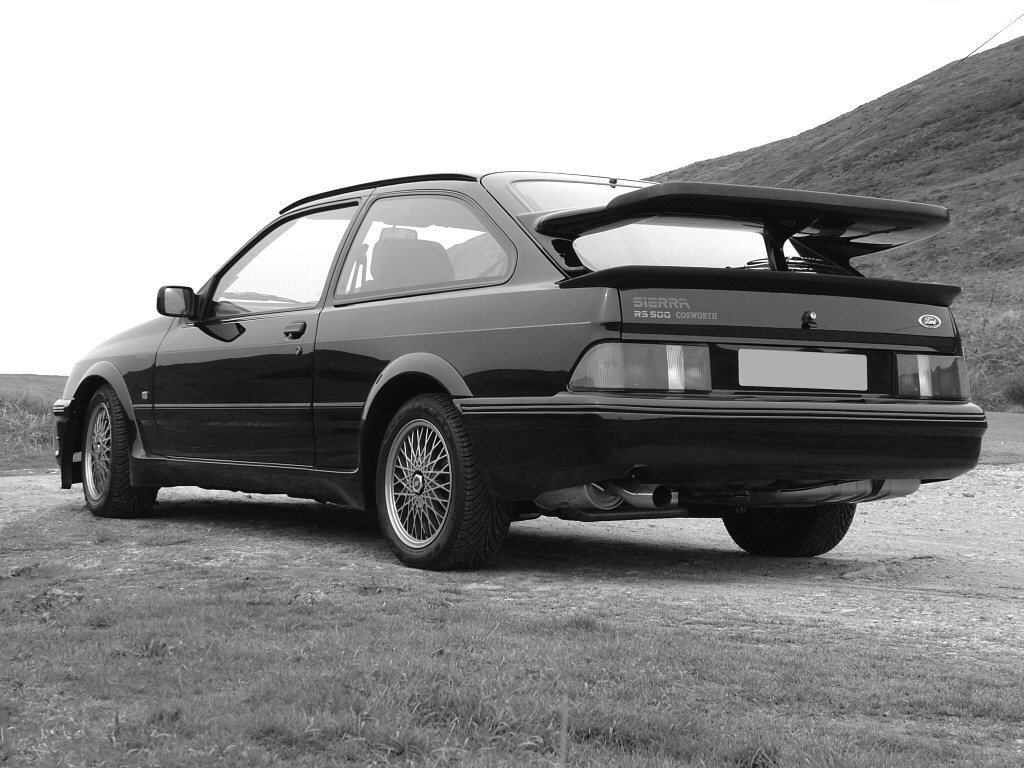
1987 Ford Sierra RS500 Cosworth

In 1983, the high-performance XR4i version was introduced. It used the same 2.8 L Cologne engine as used in the Ford Capri 2.8 Injection of that era and sported a restyled version of the 3-door Sierra bodyshell. The double rear spoiler and curious multi-pillared rear windows were considered over-styled by some prospective buyers, and the car never achieved the cult status of the smaller Fiesta XR2 and Escort XR3i. A version of the XR4i with a 2.3 L turbocharged engine was sold in the United States as the Merkur XR4Ti. The XR4Ti was raced in Europe, most notably by Andy Rouse who used one to win the 1985 BTCC.

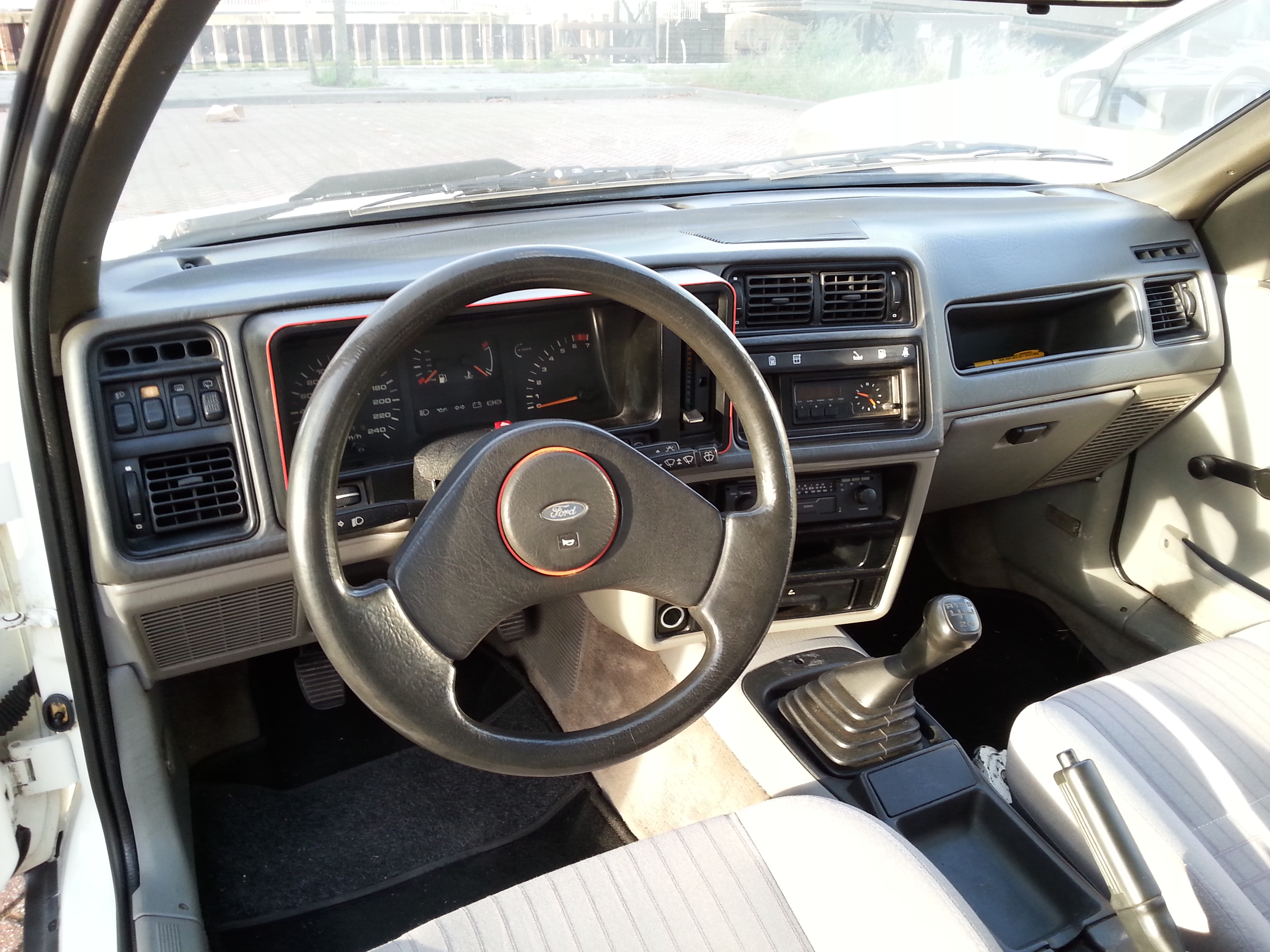
The dashboard of a 1984 XR4i

In South Africa, there was a 3.0 L V6 version, called the XR6, also made in South Africa was a limited run of 250 V8 XR8s for saloon car racing homologation in 1984. These were based on the Ford Windsor 302 engine.

In 1985 the XR4i was replaced by the XR4x4, which was based on the five-door hatchback, had four-wheel drive and was powered by the same 2.8-litre V6 engine but wasn't equipped with the biplane rear spoiler. Only a very limited number of three-door XR4x4's have been built. By the end of its production in 1990, 23,540 had been produced. From 1990 to 1993 the XR4x4 was available with both the revised 2.9 EFi and 2.0 DOHC EFi engines. The XR4i also made a reappearance (as a badging exercise) in 5-door form but with the DOHC 2.0 engine instead of the V6.

In 1989, Ford nodded towards its past and created the Sierra 2.0i 2000E, a model name used with limited success on the Mk3 Cortina. The Sierra 2000E had two-tone metallic paint, alloys, light grey leather interior, and a trip computer in addition the standard features on the 'Ghia' models. It was available only in saloon form and a limited number of models were sold between 1989 and 1991. Ford used this to showcase the new DOHC twin-cam engine which was also released in 1989.

In Argentina the non-injected XR4 model was equipped with the Taunus 2.3 engine and was produced between 1986 and 1991. In this market the most direct rival was the Renault Fuego 2.2.

In July 1986, a special version called the Ford Sierra RS Cosworth was launched, using the 2.0 OHC bottom end with a 16V DOHC cylinder head specially developed by Cosworth. With the Cosworth Garret T3 turbocharger and intercooler setup the engine produced 204 PS (150 kW; 201 hp). It was designed by Ford's Special Vehicle Engineering (SVE) group and made in Ford's Genk factory in Belgium for use in group A. It was based on a three-door Sierra with the dashboard from the Merkur XR4Ti. The car was available in only white, black, or Ford's 'Moonstone Blue' and only 5545 were made. The Sierra RS Cosworth was available in both right-hand drive and left-hand drive, the RS500 was produced only in right-hand drive. Racing conversions were done with the European Merkur dashboard.

In 1987, a 225 PS (165 kW; 222 hp) Sierra Cosworth, the RS500, was sold alongside the regular version. Only 500 were produced as the minimum number of road-going cars required to meet with newly introduced homologation racing rules, allowing it to compete in evolution form for group-A racing. The car was modified by the Tickford Engineering Company in conjunction with Ford. Revisions included uprated brakes and larger brake cooling ducts and modified front and rear spoilers (a second smaller rear spoiler was added beneath the large "whale-tail"), a modified front bumper to allow extra cooling for a larger intercooler, as well as various engine upgrades including a larger turbocharger and a second fuel rail (which did not operate on road models). Race outputs were as high as 550 bhp (410 kW; 558 PS), in which the Sierra dominated group-A series around the world.

Racing versions of the Cosworth were highly successful in European and World Touring Car racing throughout the late 1980s and early 1990s, and the RS500 helped Ford to win the manufacturer's title in the 1987 World Touring Car Championship. Ford was forced to fall back on the Sierra for rallying from 1987, after the banning of the Group B formula. With only rear drive, the Sierra struggled to compete on looser surfaces but was very quick on asphalt, Didier Auriol winning his first World Championship rally in a Sierra in Corsica, 1988. It was replaced by the 4x4 Sapphire version from 1990, which never managed to win a World Championship event but became a popular and successful car in national championships. The Sierra was replaced by the Escort Cosworth in 1993.

In 1988, a new Cosworth was produced which was based on the Sierra Sapphire saloon. 13,140 were produced until it was replaced in 1990 by a four-wheel-drive version, the Sierra Sapphire RS Cosworth 4x4, of which 12,250 were built. Its replacement came in the form of the Escort RS Cosworth which appeared in 1992, which used a shortened and developed version of the Sierra platform and running gear but clothed with an Escort-esque bodyshell and the return of the whale-tail spoiler.

== Turbocharged versions ==
Turbocharged versions of the Sierra were also available as post-production models from companies like Janspeed and, most notably, from Turbo Technics. The XR4x4 2.8 was available with a range of aftermarket kits pushing power from 150 PS (110 kW; 148 hp) to over 200 hp (149 kW). The 2.9 got a twin-turbo setup, available with variants up to 280 hp (209 kW). Even the DOHC version got a single turbo kit, of which only a small number were made. Turbo Technics even sold their own pre-prepared Sierra known as the Minker; only a handful were ever produced, as they cost significantly more than Ford's own RS Cosworth.

In Finland, tax laws made the 1.3-litre and 1.6-litre-engined Sierras attractive business cars in the mid 1980s. Beginning in 1982, a number of these smaller engines were turbocharged locally in order to gain 2.0 L engine power without moving into the higher tax bracket. The 2.0 L OHC engine was also available turbocharged. These are often called "Stockmann Turbo" Sierras, after the provider of the most popular conversion kits. After stricter emissions standards were introduced for 1989, Stockmann focused on getting the more popular 1.6-litre kit approved and stopped offering the other ones. They were not intended as sporting cars, but were "tax specials" meant to save owners money without sacrificing power. The purchase price of a 1.6 Turbo was marginally higher than that of a factory 2.0, but the difference was quickly made up in tax savings.

== Changes during production life ==
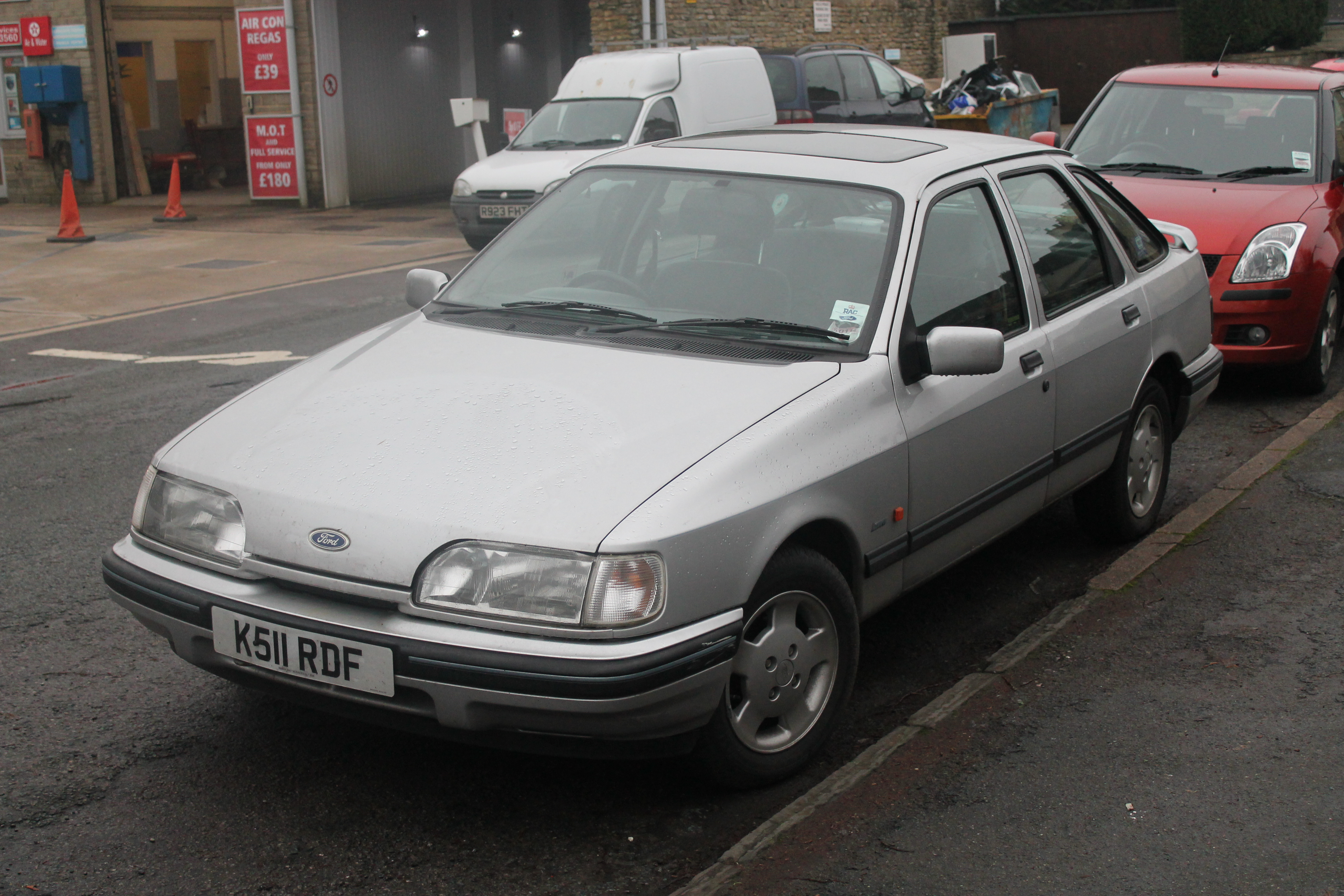
1992 Ford Sierra MkII Azura (UK)

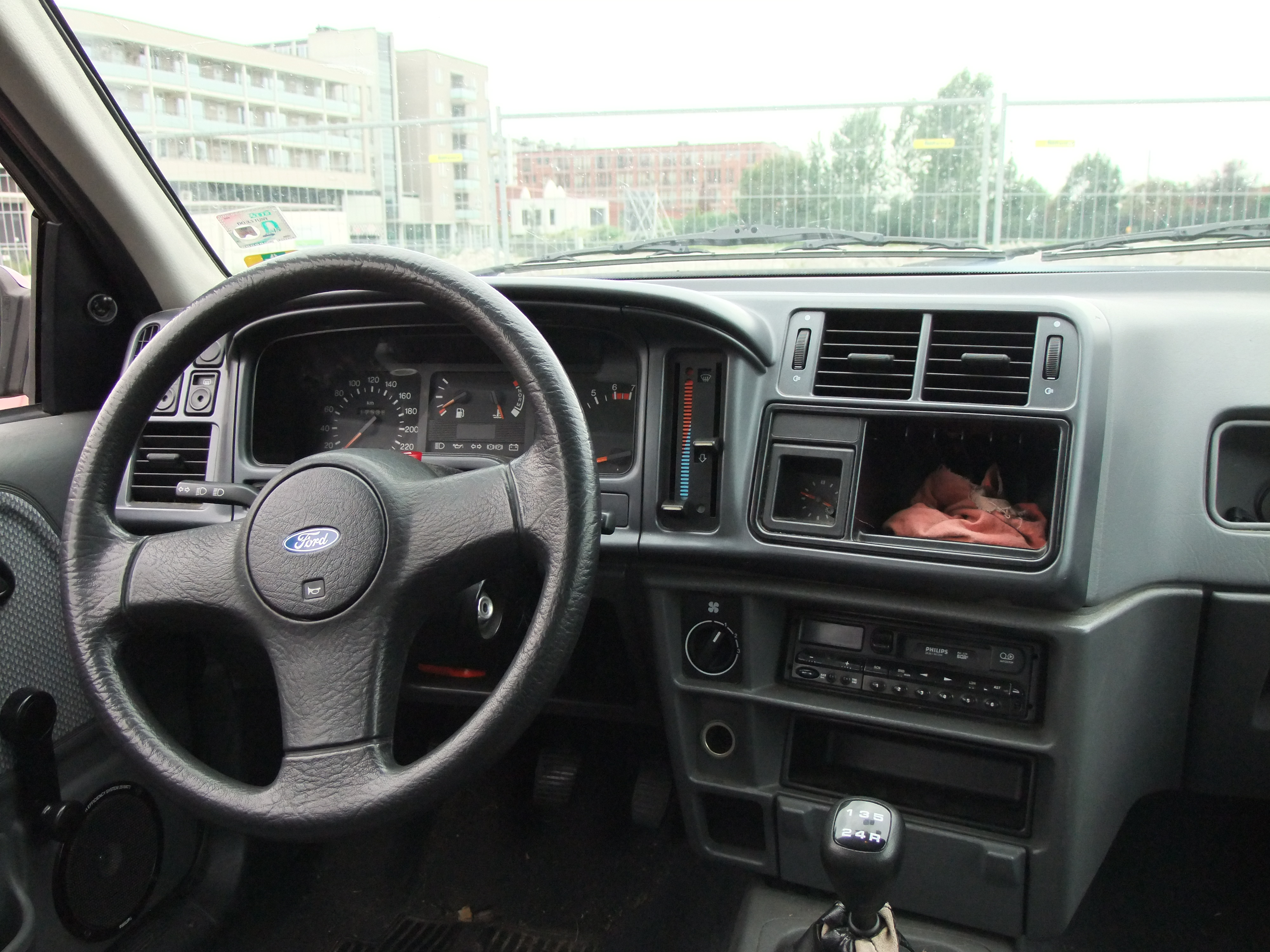
1990 Ford Sierra MkII CLX dashboard

After the major facelift of 1987, and the introduction of the DOHC engines in 1989, further changes to the Sierra were superficial. Some detail styling changes were made in 1990, when the dashboard styling was freshened up, the front was given clear-lensed indicators, the rear given smoked rear lamp lenses, the steering wheel redesigned, and a new front grille was added, together with fuel injection as standard, 15-inch wheels and rear disc brakes. UK production of the Sierra ceased in 1990 with right-hand-drive production moving to Belgium.

During the 1992 model year, the 1.6-litre Pinto engine was finally dropped (as it was not re-engineered for the upcoming Euro 1 emissions legislation) and replaced by a CVH unit of similar capacity, marking the end of the venerable Pinto unit after it had been introduced in the Cortina/Taunus some 21 years earlier. The 1992 model year cars saw the final revisions – most notably to the dashboard which gained a more rounded instrument binnacle similar in style to the 1990 Escort and Orion, along with specification, colour, and trim upgrades across the range.

By 1989, Ford had confirmed that the successor to the Sierra (due by 1993) would feature front-wheel drive, and a number of concept cars were shown in the motoring press, hinting at what the new car might look like. It had become clear that the Sierra had fallen out of step technologically against modern Japanese rivals which offered multi-valve engines and multi-link rear suspension. All of these features appeared on the Sierra's replacement, the front-wheel-drive Mondeo, which was unveiled in November 1992 and went on sale the following March.

== Popularity ==
The Sierra is the tenth most popular car to have been sold in Britain, with 1,299,993 units having been sold. The first Sierras were sold in October 1982, and stocks lasted for around two years after the end of production – with more than 200 models being sold in 1994 and at least one example being sold in 1995 (in February as an M-registered model).

The Sierra remained a common sight on the roads in the United Kingdom and several other European countries, and a popular second-hand buy, until well into the 21st century. However, just 2,425 Ford Sierras were reported to be taxed and still on UK roads in December 2019, with 11,562 currently SORN.
