= Ford Cologne V6 engine =

Ford Cologne V6
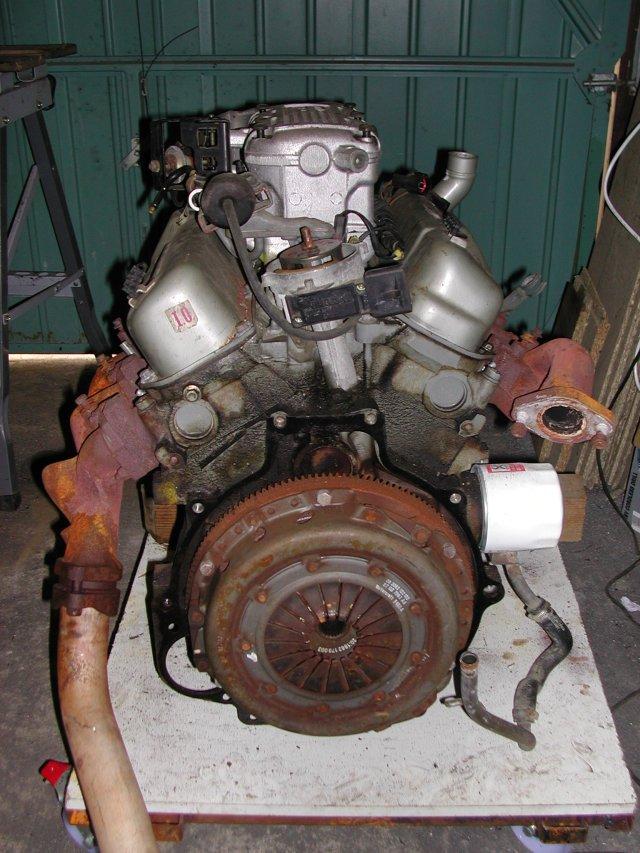

Overview
- Manufacturer: Ford Motor Company
- Also called: Ford Taunus V6
- Production: 1962–2011

Layout
- Configuration: 60° V6
- Displacement: 1.8 L (1,812 cc; 110.6 cu in); 2.0 L (1,998 cc; 121.9 cu in); 2.3 L (2,293 cc; 139.9 cu in); 2.4 L (2,394 cc; 146.1 cu in); 2.6 L (2,550 cc; 155.6 cu in); 2.6 L (2,637 cc; 160.9 cu in); 2.8 L (2,792 cc; 170.4 cu in); 2.9 L (2,935 cc; 179.1 cu in); 4.0 L (3,958 cc; 241.5 cu in); 4.0 L (4,000 cc; 244.1 cu in)
- Cylinder bore: 80 mm (3.15 in); 82 mm (3.23 in); 84 mm (3.31 in); 90 mm (3.54 in); 93.03 mm (3.66 in); 96 mm (3.78 in); 100 mm (3.94 in)
- Piston stroke: 60.14 mm (2.37 in); 66.8 mm (2.63 in); 68.5 mm (2.70 in); 69 mm (2.72 in); 72 mm (2.83 in); 74 mm (2.91 in); 84 mm (3.31 in)
- Cylinder block material: Cast iron
- Cylinder head material: Aluminium, Cast iron
- Valvetrain: OHV or SOHC 12-valve DOHC 24-valve
- Valvetrain drive system: Gears (1.8, 2.0, 2.3, 2.6, 2.8); Chain (2.4, 2.9); Chains (4.0 SOHC)

Combustion
- Supercharger: Eaton M90 Roots-type (on some 2.8 and 2.9 engines)
- Turbocharger: Janspeed and Turbo Technics (on some 2.8 and 2.9 engines)
- Fuel system: Carburettor; Mechanical fuel injection Electronic fuel injection
- Management: Bosch K-Jetronic or L-Jetronic (on some versions)
- Fuel type: Petrol
- Cooling system: Water-cooled

Output
- Power output: 82–328 PS (60–241 kW; 81–324 hp)
- Torque output: 135–344 N⋅m (100–254 lb⋅ft)

Chronology
- Predecessor: Ford straight-six engine
- Successor: Ford Vulcan engine

The Ford Cologne V6 is a series of 60° cast iron block V6 engines produced by the Ford Motor Company from 1962 to 2011 in displacements ranging from 1.8 L (1,812 cc; 110.6 cu in) to 4.0 L (4,000 cc; 244.1 cu in). Originally, the Cologne V6 was installed in vehicles intended for Germany and Continental Europe, while the unrelated British Essex V6 was used in cars for the British market. Later, the Cologne V6 largely replaced the Essex V6 for British-market vehicles. These engines were also used in the United States, especially in compact trucks.

During its production run the Cologne V6 was offered in displacements of 1.8, 2.0, 2.3, 2.4, 2.6, 2.8, 2.9, and 4.0 litres. All except the Cosworth 24v derivative and later 4.0-litre SOHC engines were pushrod overhead-valve engines, with a single camshaft between the banks.

The Cologne V6 was designed to be compatible in installation with the Ford Taunus V4 engine, having the same transmission bolt pattern, the same engine mounts, and in many versions, a cylinder head featuring "siamesed" exhaust passages, which reduced the three exhaust outlets down to two on each side. The latter feature was great for compatibility, but poor for performance. The 2.4, 2.8 (in U.S.), 2.9, and 4.0 had three exhaust ports, making them preferable.

The engine was available in both carburetted and fuel-injected forms.

== 1.8 ==
The smallest version of the V6 was the 1.8 L (1,812 cc; 110.6 cu in) with an 80 mm × 60.14 mm (3.15 in × 2.37 in) bore and stroke. Its output is 82 PS (60 kW; 81 hp) and 135 N⋅m (100 lb⋅ft). Its only application was the Ford 17M P7 from 1968 to 1971.

== 2.0 ==
The original displacement of the V6 was 2.0 L (1,998 cc; 121.9 cu in) with an 84 mm × 60.14 mm (3.31 in × 2.37 in) bore and stroke. Output is 85 PS (63 kW; 84 hp) and 151 N⋅m (111 lb⋅ft) or 90 PS (66 kW; 89 hp) and 158 N⋅m (117 lb⋅ft).

Applications:

- 1964–1967 Ford Taunus 20M (P5)
- 1967–1968 Ford 20M (P7.1)
- 1968–1971 Ford 20M (P7.2)
- 1969–1981 Ford Capri I – III (Not available on UK models)
- 1970–1976 Ford Taunus TC
- 1976–1979 Ford Taunus II
- 1979–1982 Ford Taunus III
- 1975–1977 Ford Granada I (Not available on UK models)
- 1977–1985 Ford Granada II (Not available on UK models)
- 1982 Ford Sierra (Not available in UK models)

== 2.3 ==
The first enlargement of the V6 appeared in 1967. It was the 2.3 L (2,293 cc; 139.9 cu in) with a 90 mm × 60.14 mm (3.54 in × 2.37 in) bore and stroke. Output was 108 / 114 PS (79 / 84 kW; 107 / 112 hp) (black/grey valve cover) and 176 N⋅m (130 lb⋅ft) or 125 PS (92 kW; 123 hp) and 187 N⋅m (138 lb⋅ft) in SuperHighCompression

- 1967–1968 Ford 20M P7
- 1969–1971 Ford 17M RS
- 1968–1971 Ford 20M P7b
- 1969–1974 Ford Capri I
- 1974–1978 Ford Capri II
- 1978–1985 Ford Capri III
- 1971–1976 Ford Taunus TC
- 1976–1979 Ford Taunus II
- 1979–1982 Ford Taunus III
- 1977–1979 Ford Cortina IV
- 1979–1982 Ford Cortina V
- 1972–1977 Ford Granada I
- 1977–1985 Ford Granada II
- 1982–1984 Ford Sierra I
- 1968 Siva Sirio
- 1968 LMX 2300 HCS GT

== 2.4 ==
The 2.4 L (2,394 cc; 146.1 cu in) was used only in Europe. Like the 2.9 L version, the camshaft is chain-driven, it has fuel injection system (EFI) and Ford's EEC-IV engine management. Bore and stroke is 84 mm × 72 mm (3.31 in × 2.83 in). Power output is 125 PS (92 kW; 123 hp) at 5800 rpm and 184 N⋅m (136 lb⋅ft) torque at 3500 rpm.

Applications:

- Ford Scorpio/Granada III

== 2.6 ==
The largest first-generation V6 was the 2.6 L (2,550 cc; 155.6 cu in) introduced in 1969. It had a 90 mm × 66.8 mm (3.54 in × 2.63 in) bore and stroke. Output was 125 PS (92 kW; 123 hp) and 205 N⋅m (151 lb⋅ft).

Applications:

- 1969–1971 Ford 20M RS
- 1969–1971 Ford 26M
- 1970–1974 Ford Capri (Not available on UK models)
- 1972–1977 Ford Granada (Not available on UK models)

== 2.6 RS ==
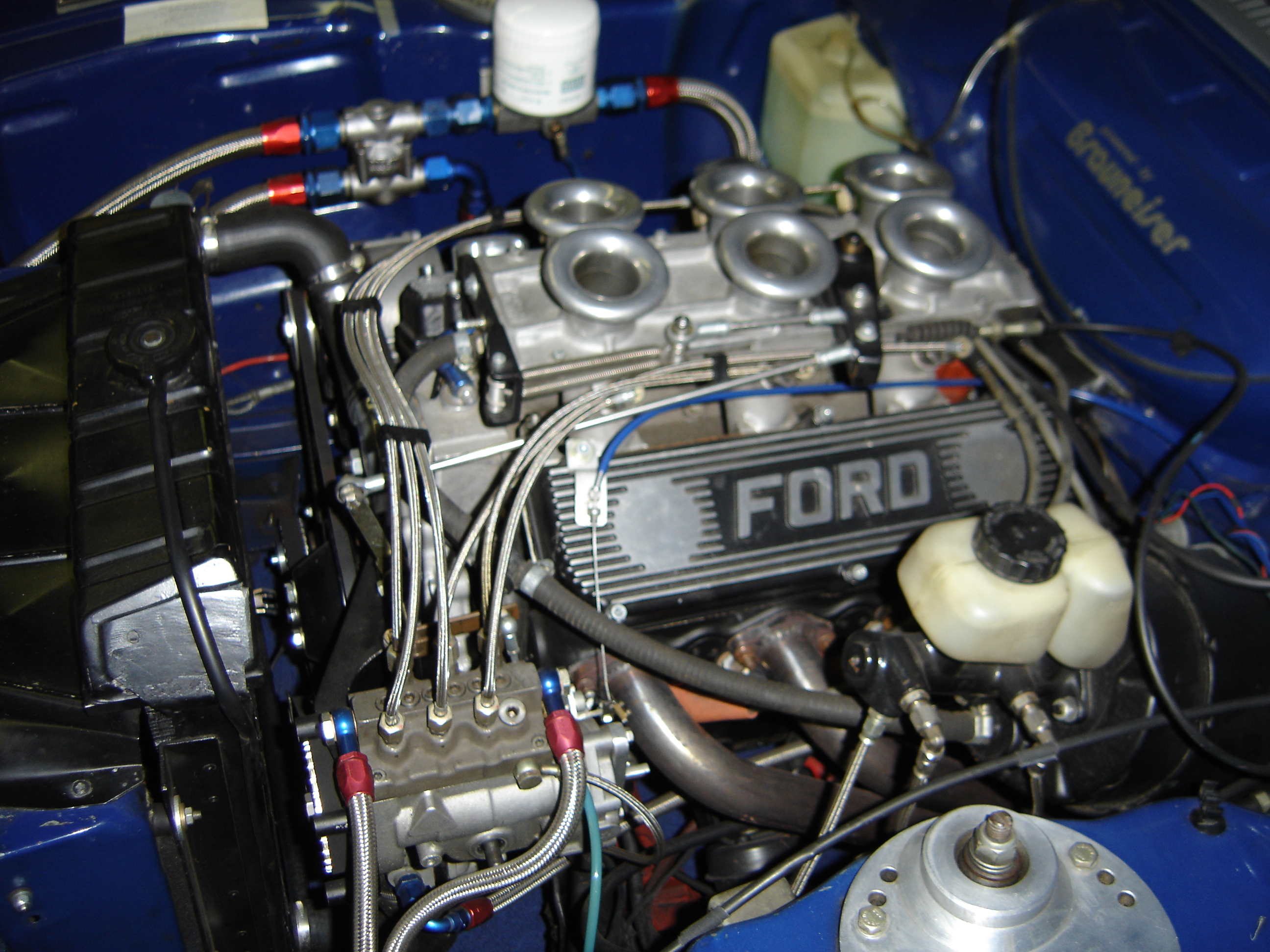
Ford-Weslake V6 in 1971 Capri RS

The 2.6 RS was a special high-performance fuel-injected 2.6 L (2,637 cc; 160.9 cu in) version. It had a 90 mm × 69 mm (3.54 in × 2.72 in) bore and stroke, and produced 150 PS (110 kW; 148 hp) and 219.5 N⋅m (162 lb⋅ft).

The only fuel injected first-generation engine, its sole application was the 1970-1973 Ford Capri RS 2600. It was replaced with the RS 3100. Weslake developed a racing version of the engine, bored to 96 mm (3.78 in) to give 3.0 L (2,995 cc; 182.8 cu in) of displacement and producing in excess of 320 PS (235 kW; 316 hp).

- Ford Capri 2600 RS from 1970 to 1973

== 2.8 ==
The second-generation Cologne V6 was introduced in 1974. It displaced 2.8 L (2,792 cc; 170.4 cu in) with a bore and stroke of 93.03 mm × 68.5 mm (3.66 in × 2.70 in), and used a geared camshaft design. While based on the 2.6, the larger bore necessitated a different block. The European version used a "siamesed" two-port exhaust manifold, similar to the one used on the V4, while the American version used three-port heads. The European approach was useful in that existing cars with the V4 engine could be upgraded with relative ease. Output was rated at 90 to 115 bhp (67 to 86 kW; 91 to 117 PS) for the US market and 130 to 160 PS (96 to 118 kW; 128 to 158 bhp) for the European market, depending on the model.

In Europe, the 2.8 was produced with carburetor 132 PS (97 kW; 130 bhp), mechanical fuel injection (Bosch K-Jetronic, 160 PS (118 kW; 158 bhp), and electronic injection (Ford EEC-IV, 150 PS (110 kW; 148 bhp)). Electronic injection only featured on the 2.8 Granada models for one year before being replaced with the 2.9 unit.

Tuning options are very limited with the Bosch K-Jetronic models. The siamesed inlet and exhaust ports of the 2.8 only respond well to forced induction or an overbore; normal tuning will yield only minor power results. The MFI 2.8 Cologne (Capri/Sierra 2.8i) uses a very restricted induction setup, and no open air kit is available due to this.

Ford offered a limited run of approximately 150 "Capri turbos" with turbocharged 2.8 engines. These engines displayed RS badging and used a productionized version of an existing aftermarket kit offered by a Ford dealer in Germany.

TVR Tasmin/280i used the Cologne 2.8 with Bosch K-Jetronic fuel injection, as did the early TVR 'S' series in 2.8 and revised 2.9 efi injection form.

Applications:

- TVR 280i/Tasmin
- TVR S1
- Ford Ranger
- Ford Bronco II
- Ford Aerostar
- Ford Pinto
- Mercury Bobcat
- Mercury Capri
- Ford Mustang II
- Ford Mustang (Gen 3 1979)
- Ford Granada
- Ford Capri III
- Ford Sierra XR4x4 and XR4i
- Ford Scorpio
- Bandvagn 206
- Reliant Scimitar (1979 onwards)
- Panther Kallista

== 2.9 ==
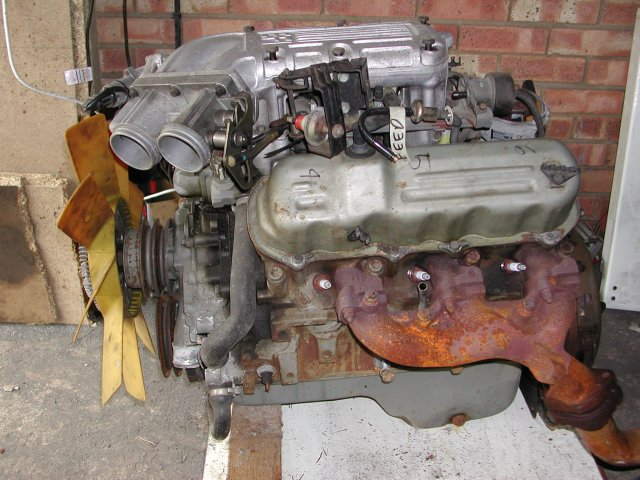
Left side of a 2.9-litre: Unlike the 2.8, the 2.9 does not merge the three exhaust ports into two manifold pipes.

Although the 2.9 L shares its basic configuration and several key dimensions with the earlier 2.8 L, it is the result of an extensive redesign of the engine. The 2.9 cylinder block is 30% more rigid than the 2.8's, without being any heavier. New, slightly dished pistons use much thinner rings that reduce friction losses. The connecting rods are thicker in places, and the cast nodular iron crankshaft has six counterweights. The camshaft is chain-driven rather than gear driven, and so rotates in the same direction as the crankshaft. The arrangement of the exhaust valves is different, eliminating the "hot-spot" that existed on the 2.8 L model. New cylinder heads incorporate separate exhaust ports for each cylinder, rather than the previous engine's conjoined ports. The combustion chamber is a high-swirl design, with a centrally located spark plug.

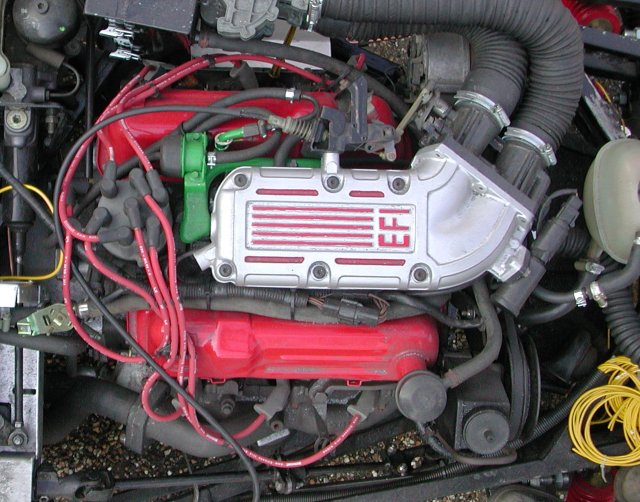
Top view of a fuel-injected European 2.9-litre. Note the two intake feeds going to the intake manifold. The fuel rail is painted green.

In Europe, this engine was commonly fitted with the Bosch L-Jetronic fuel-injection system, married to Ford's EEC-IV engine management. An unusual feature on European 2.9 engines is a split-intake system, with two intake pipes going from the filter box to the intake manifold, which contains two separate plenums, each feeding one cylinder bank. The plenums are connected only by a small cross-over port to equalize pressures between the sides.

Output was rated at 140 hp (104 kW; 142 PS) at 4600 rpm and 170 lb⋅ft (230 N⋅m) at 2600 rpm for the light trucks (1986–92 Ranger and 1986–90 Bronco II) and 144 hp (107 kW; 146 PS) at 4800 rpm for the Merkur Scorpio in the US market and 150 to 160 hp (112 to 119 kW; 152 to 162 PS) for the European market. Bore and stroke was 93 mm × 72 mm (3.66 in × 2.83 in) for a total displacement of 2.9 L (2,935 cc; 179.1 cu in).

Applications:

- TVR S2/S3(C)/S4C
- Ford Bronco II
- Ford Ranger
- Ford Sierra XR 4X4, Ghia 4x4 Estate
- Ford Granada
- Ford Scorpio
- Ford Transit
- Merkur Scorpio
- Panther Kallista
- Middlebridge Scimitar GTE

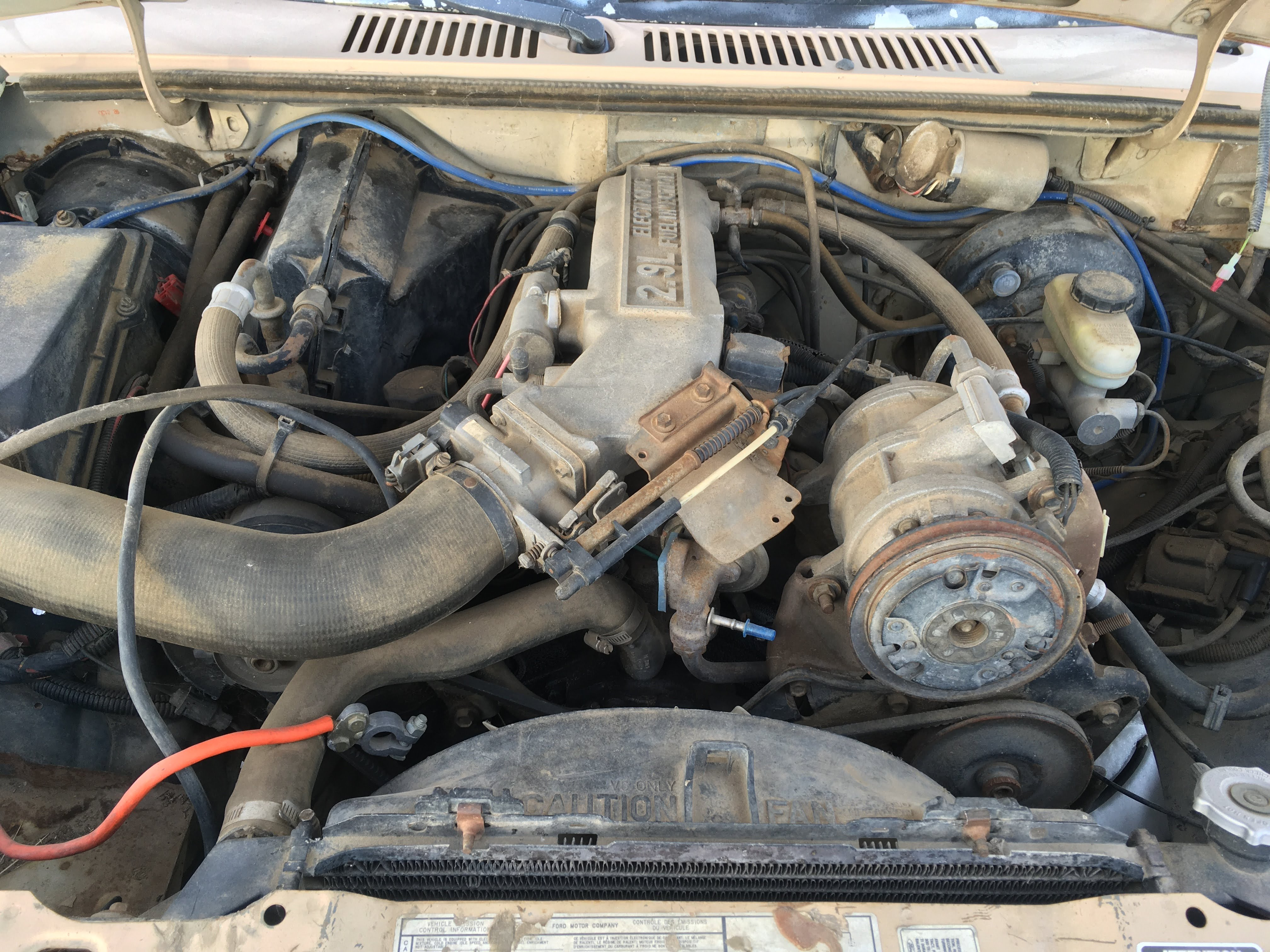
Top front view of a 2.9 from a 1986 Bronco II. The 2.9 found in Rangers and the like feature a distinctive upper intake manifold that reads "2.9L Electronic Fuel Injection" These 2.9s also feature a single throttle body as opposed to dual throttle bodies.

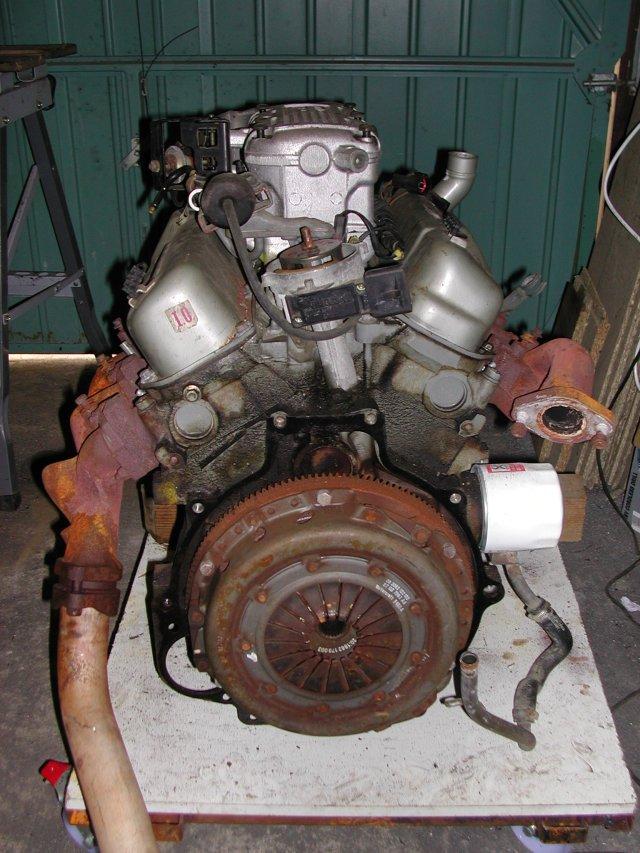
View of a 2.9-litre from the rear, flywheel side: Note the 60° between the cylinder banks.

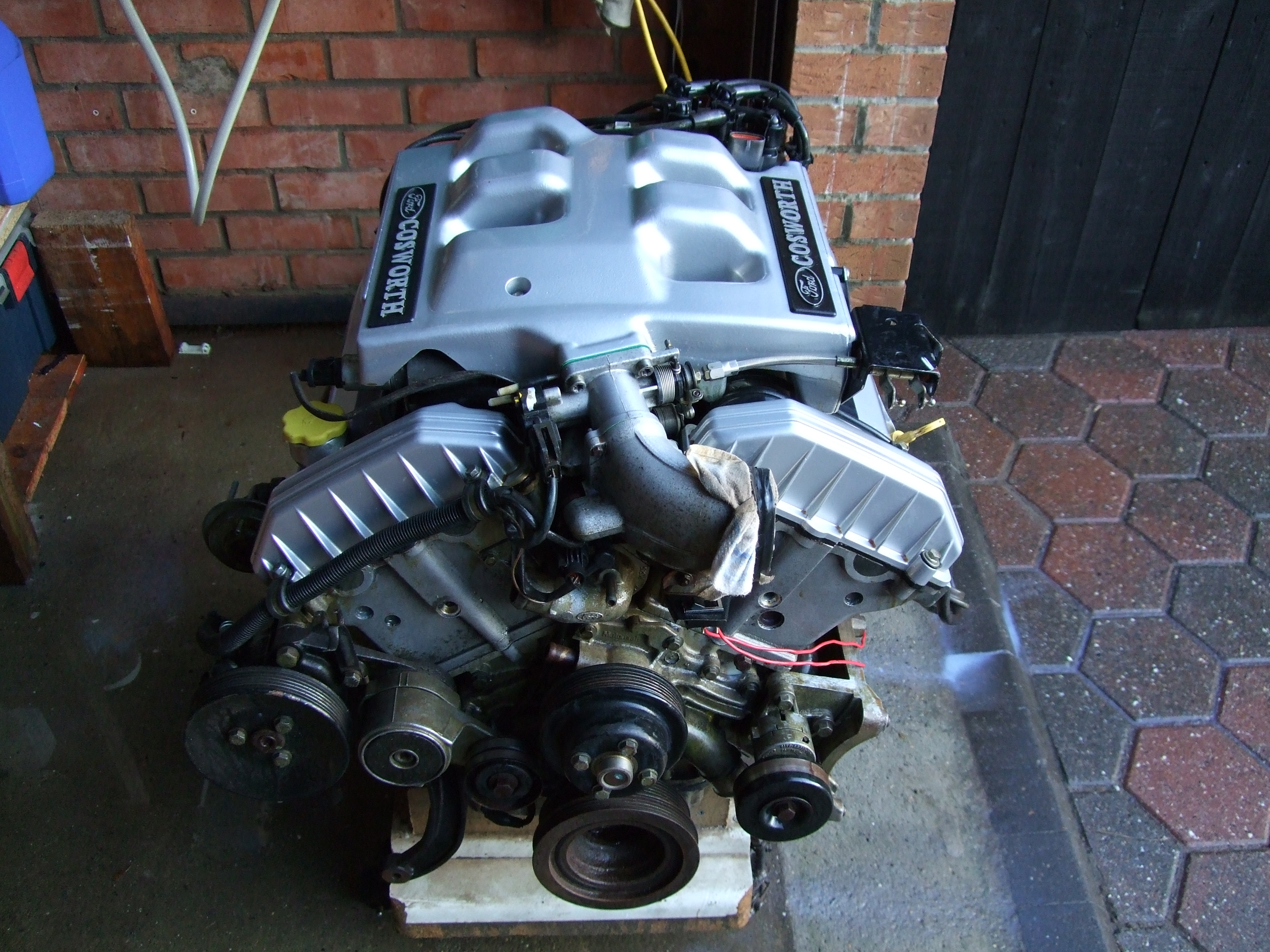
The 2932 cc Cologne V6 24v BOA engineered by Cosworth

=== 2.9 Cosworth ===
A special twin DOHC (QUAD CAM) version of the 2.9 was created by Cosworth Engineering in 1991. Although it shared the same block as the standard 2.9, power output was up to 195 PS (143 kW; 192 hp) and torque was boosted to 203 lb⋅ft (275 N⋅m) at 4500 rpm. This engine (code BOA) was used in the Ford Scorpio Cosworth 24V. This engine configuration was only paired with an improved A4LDe automatic gearbox with partial electronic shift control. No manual gearbox was offered from the factory.

The standard Ford-issued block was machined differently to improve strength. In place of the single-cam arrangement, an endless duplex hydraulically tensioned timing chain was used to drive the overhead cams. The chain measured 2.2 m (7 ft 3 in). The casting and bearings for the standard underhead cam were repurposed for a shaft which drove the oil pump. Ignition was controlled by an EDIS-6 system, which would become a standard feature.

The engine was known for its substantial increase in power delivery above 4000 rpm relative to the unmodified version; in recent years, the engine has become a popular choice as a replacement engine for the Ford Sierra XR4x4 and XR4i.

An improved version of this engine (code BOB) was available in the restyled 1995 Ford Scorpio. Differences included two simplex chains with two hydraulic tensioners and the addition of a variable-length intake system called VIS. Power output was increased to 210 bhp (157 kW; 213 PS). This was mated to a fully electronically controlled A4LDE automatic transmission.

== 4.0 ==
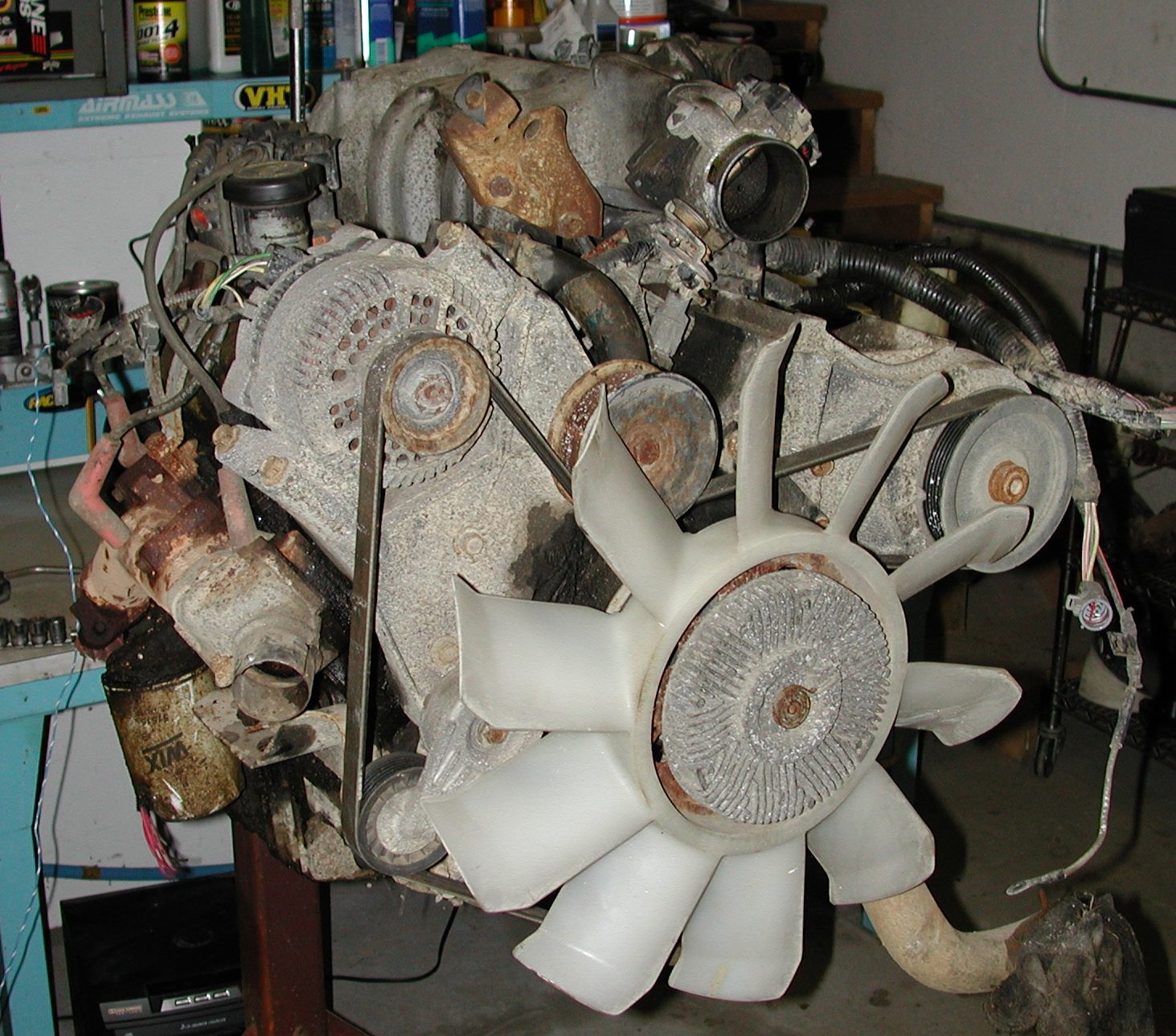
A 1992 4.0 from a Ford Ranger pickup

The pushrod 4.0 L (4,000 cc; 244.1 cu in), with a bore and stroke of 100.33 mm × 84.33 mm (3.950 in × 3.320 in) version, although produced in Cologne, Germany, was only fitted to American vehicles. The OHV engine was produced until 2000 and was used in the Ford Explorer, Ford Aerostar, Mazda B4000, and Ford Ranger. Output was 160 hp (119 kW; 162 PS) and 305 N⋅m (225 lb⋅ft). Though some variation exists, typically 155 hp (116 kW; 157 PS) is quoted as horsepower for 1990–92 applications.

Applications:

- 1993-2000 Ford Ranger/Mazda B-Series
- 1991-2000 Ford Explorer/Mazda Navajo
- Cross Lander 244X
- 1990-1997 Ford Aerostar

=== SOHC ===
The SOHC version was introduced in 1997 in the Ford Explorer, alongside the original pushrod version. It features a variable length intake manifold and produces 210 hp (157 kW; 213 PS) and 254 lb⋅ft (344 N⋅m)_{f}. (The variable length intake manifold was discontinued in 1998, replaced by a standard intake.) It uses a jackshaft in place of a camshaft to drive a timing chain to each cylinder head. Three timing chains are used, one from the crank to the jackshaft, one in the front of the engine to drive the cam for the left bank, and one on the back of the engine to drive the cam for the right bank. In addition, the 4WD Ranger/Explorer with the SOHC 4.0 had a 4th timing chain driving what Ford called a balance shaft. Ford has since phased out the engine in favor of the more powerful and efficient Duratec 37.

==== Timing chain problems ====
The 4.0 SOHC engine was notorious for the OEM timing chain guides and tensioners breaking, resulting in timing chain rattle or "death rattle". This problem can occur as early as 45,000 mi (72,000 km) in some vehicles. Due to the SOHC engine's unique design involving both front and rear timing chains, the repair of the timing guides would often require complete engine removal depending on the severity of the problem. When the engine is run for an extended period of time with this issue the engine can jump timing, damaging the heads and valves.

Timing chain rattle was mitigated in later years of the SOHC (in most vehicles, after 2002) with updated cassettes and tensioners. This problem occurs with varying frequency among some Ford vehicles equipped with the SOHC engine including the Ford Mustang, Ford Explorer, and Ford Ranger. The 4.0 OHV was not affected by this issue.

==== Other versions ====
A version of the engine is used in the Land Rover Discovery 3 / LR3 in Australia/North America and Ford Courier in Australia, producing 216 hp (161 kW; 219 PS) and 250 lb⋅ft (339 N⋅m) of torque at 3,000 rpm for the Land Rover version. The Ford Courier version produces 154 kW (209 PS; 207 hp) of power and 323 N⋅m (33 kg⋅m; 238 lb⋅ft) of torque. The Land Rover version of the engine became unavailable in the United States for the 2008 model year.

Applications:

- 2001–2012 Ford Ranger
- 2001–2010 Mazda B4000
- 1997–2010 Ford Explorer/Mercury Mountaineer
- 2004–2006 Ford Courier
- 2005–2010 Ford Mustang
- 2005–2009 Land Rover Discovery 3 / LR3 The Land Rover version of the cast iron engine block has different motor mount castings/machined surfaces for the motor mounts and the left mount engine knock sensor, plus the engine girdle (upper oil pan) has a threaded hole drilled and tapped for an engine oil temperature sensor.
