= Ford Aerostar =

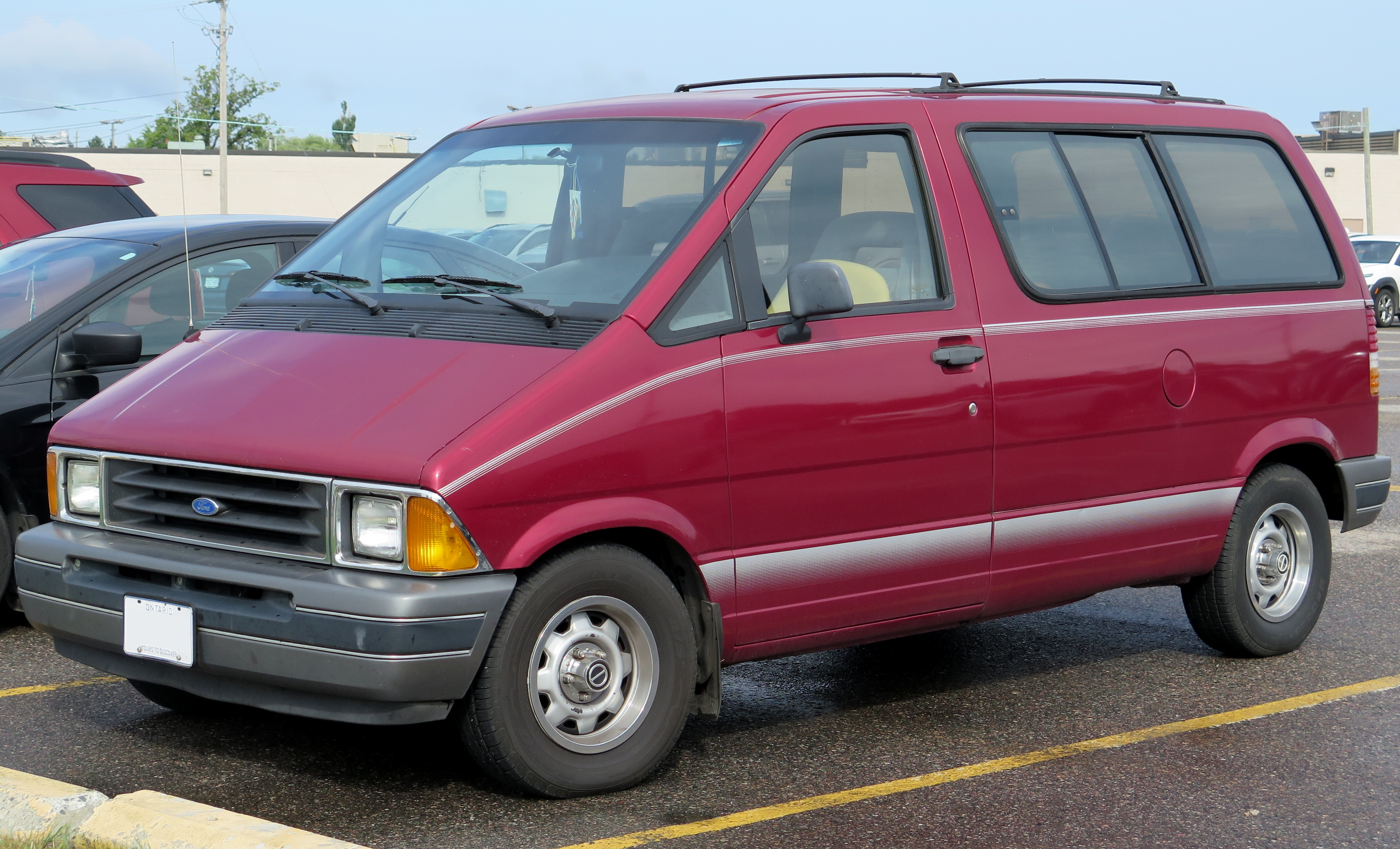
- 1991 Aerostar XL

Overview
- Manufacturer: Ford
- Model code: VN1
- Production: June 15, 1985 – August 22, 1997
- Model years: 1986–1997
- Assembly: United States: Hazelwood, Missouri (St. Louis Assembly)

Body and chassis
- Class: Minivan
- Layout: Front-engine, rear-wheel drive; Front-engine, all-wheel drive (1990–1997)
- Platform: Ford VN1 platform

Powertrain
- Engine: 2.3 L Lima I4 (1986–1987); 2.8 L Cologne V6 (1986); 3.0 L Vulcan V6 (1986–1997); 4.0 L Cologne V6 (1990–1997)
- Transmission: 5-speed M5OD-R1 manual 4-speed automatic 5-speed automatic

Dimensions
- Wheelbase: 118.9 in (3,020 mm)
- Length: Standard-length:174.9 in (4,440 mm); Extended-length:190.3 in (4,830 mm)
- Width: 71.7 in (1,820 mm)
- Height: 72.2–74.0 in (1,830–1,880 mm)

Chronology
- Successor: Ford Windstar; Ford Transit Connect (for cargo van)

The Ford Aerostar is a range of vans that was manufactured by Ford from the 1986 to the 1997 model years. The first minivan produced by Ford, the model line was marketed against the Chevrolet Astro/GMC Safari and the first two generations of the Chrysler minivans. Introduced shortly before the Ford Taurus, the Aerostar derived its name from its slope-nosed "one-box" exterior (although over six feet tall, the body of the Aerostar retained a drag coefficient of Cd=0.37, besting the Lincoln Mark VII).

The model line was sold in multiple configurations, including passenger and cargo vans, along with an extended-length body. Sold primarily in the United States and Canada, a limited number of vehicles were exported outside of North America.

The front-wheel drive Ford Windstar was introduced for the 1995 model year as the Aerostar's intended replacement, but Ford sold both model lines concurrently through the 1997 model year. The role of the Aerostar cargo van was left unfilled, with the Ford Transit Connect serving as the closest successor (in terms of size and capability).

For its entire production, the model line was assembled by the St. Louis Assembly Plant in Hazelwood, Missouri. In total, 2,029,577 vehicles were produced across a single generation.

== Development ==
=== Carousel: the garageable van ===
For Ford Motor Company, the development of the minivan began life in the early 1970s as a companion model to the third-generation Ford Econoline/Club Wagon, under development for the 1975 model year. As the full-size van was slated to grow in size, Ford explored the concept of a "garageable van", designed with a roofline to easily fit through a typical garage door opening. Additional objectives for the "garageable van" included increased interior space (over station wagons) and more desirable styling (over full-size vans). Dubbed the Ford Carousel, a prototype was tested from 1972 to 1974, using the 124-inch wheelbase chassis of the Club Wagon.

To achieve its "garageable" status, the roofline of the Carousel was lowered approximately 12 inches in comparison to a standard-wheelbase Ford Club Wagon, placing its height close to that of the later Ford Windstar/Freestar. The Carousel also received a more steeply raked windshield, a new, longer, front fascia, and a wagon-style roofline, with wraparound window glass. In a key indication of its future as a family-oriented vehicle, the Carousel had a rear tailgate with a drop-down rear window; like the LTD station wagon, it was fitted with simulated exterior woodgrain trim. The interior of the prototype was fitted with two rear bench seats trimmed similar to the Ford Country Squire and Mercury Colony Park.

While the prototype would receive a positive response from many Ford executives, for a potential 1976 introduction, the Carousel did not reach production under any model name. At the time of its development, financial constraints forced the company to divert funds towards critical projects, such as the development of the Fox platform, Panther platform, and 1980 Ford F-Series. Along with it not replacing an existing Ford model line, the Carousel did not compete against an existing GM or Chrysler vehicle. Developed during the 1973 energy crisis, the Carousel was fitted with a 460 V8, shared with full-size Ford vehicles and one-ton Ford trucks.

In 1978, Lee Iacocca and Hal Sperlich both departed Ford and were hired by Chrysler. At the time, the company had worked on its own "garageable van" project for a year, leading to its approval for development for 1979. While Chrysler would adopt the basic concept of the Ford Carousel prototype, in terms of its height and seat configuration, the resulting 1984 Dodge Caravan and Plymouth Voyager would be very different vehicles from the Carousel in terms of layout and engineering.

=== Aerostar: all-new design ===
In 1974, Ford management ended development of the Carousel prototype; through the rest of the 1970s, the company continued to see potential in "garageable vans", pursuing further design and market research on the subject. By 1980, Ford committed to a smaller vehicle, partially as the American automotive industry learned of the development of the Chrysler minivans; following the 1979 gas crisis, the company felt a 1980s release of the Carousel (a rebodied E-Series) could be an uncompetitive decision.

Along with potential fuel economy increases, in its marketplace research, Ford discovered a smaller all-new design could accommodate several design features desired in the marketplace.

- Garageability
- 7-passenger seating, walk-around interior space
- Fuel economy comparable to compact cars; trailer towing/payload comparable to full-size station wagons
- Modern exterior design and vehicle features

The new van project adopted a rear-wheel drive layout for two primary reasons. While the new van was to given a carlike ride (its 119-inch wheelbase largely placed the wheels at all four corners), another key objective for the design to tow 5000 pounds (matching the Ford Ranger, then also in design). To lower production and engineering costs, the rear-wheel drive configuration allowed shared mechanical components with multiple Ford light trucks. While Chrysler and GM small vans shared chassis commonality with other model lines (to varying degrees), the Ford small van received a model-distinct chassis (with model-specific front and rear suspension).

The design of the Aerostar carried over two primary design features of the 1972 Carousel prototype, including its approximate 6-foot "garageable" height and long wheelbase; a large B-pillar also allowed for large window area. Beyond the drawing board, the design of the Aerostar progressed further by the introduction of two Ghia-designed 7-passenger concept vehicles, the 1982 Ford Aerovan and the 1984 Ford APV. Both derived from the Ford Escort: the Aerovan was a two-door wagon; the APV was a three-door MPV/van. While smaller than the American van project, the 1982 Ford Aerovan previewed the sloped-nose front fascia of both the Aerostar and the larger 1986 Ford Transit.

While designed by its European-owned styling firm, the design of the Aerovan received a positive response from the public, leading Ford to progress with a highly advanced design for the exterior. Though the company would ultimately trail the Chrysler minivans by nearly two years in its introduction, Ford considered innovative design and features as a key selling point of the vehicle.

To further live up to the first half of its name, the Aerostar adopted integrated plastic bumpers (also previewed by the Aerovan), in contrast to the attached metal bumpers of the E-series. To further improve fuel economy, Ford used multiple lightweight materials for the body, including plastic fuel tanks, liftgate doors, and hoods; aluminum was used for the driveshaft, axles, and wheels.

In 1984, Ford debuted the Aerostar nameplate on a concept vehicle. Nearly identical to the production vehicle, the 1984 concept was styled with a two-slot grille and composite-lens headlamps; along with skirted rear fenders, the concept differed in detail changes related to the taillamps, windows, and door handles. Intended for an early 1986 model-year introduction (prior to the Taurus), the production Aerostar was intended to have a three-engine lineup, adopted from the Ranger/Bronco II. A 2.3L inline-4 was to be standard, along with a 2.8L V6; as a first for an American-produced minivan, a 2.3L turbodiesel inline-4 was to be offered as a second option.

To officially launch the model line in the summer of 1985, Ford used the "Ford Aerostar Airlift", using eight Lockheed C-130 Hercules transport aircraft to simultaneously airlift Aerostars into eight cities across the United States. In total, the entire development of the model line would cost Ford over $300 million; though lower in cost than the development of the Chrysler minivans, the Ford Aerostar was developed at the same time as the Ford Taurus (costing Ford $3.5 billion)

== Overview ==
=== Chassis ===
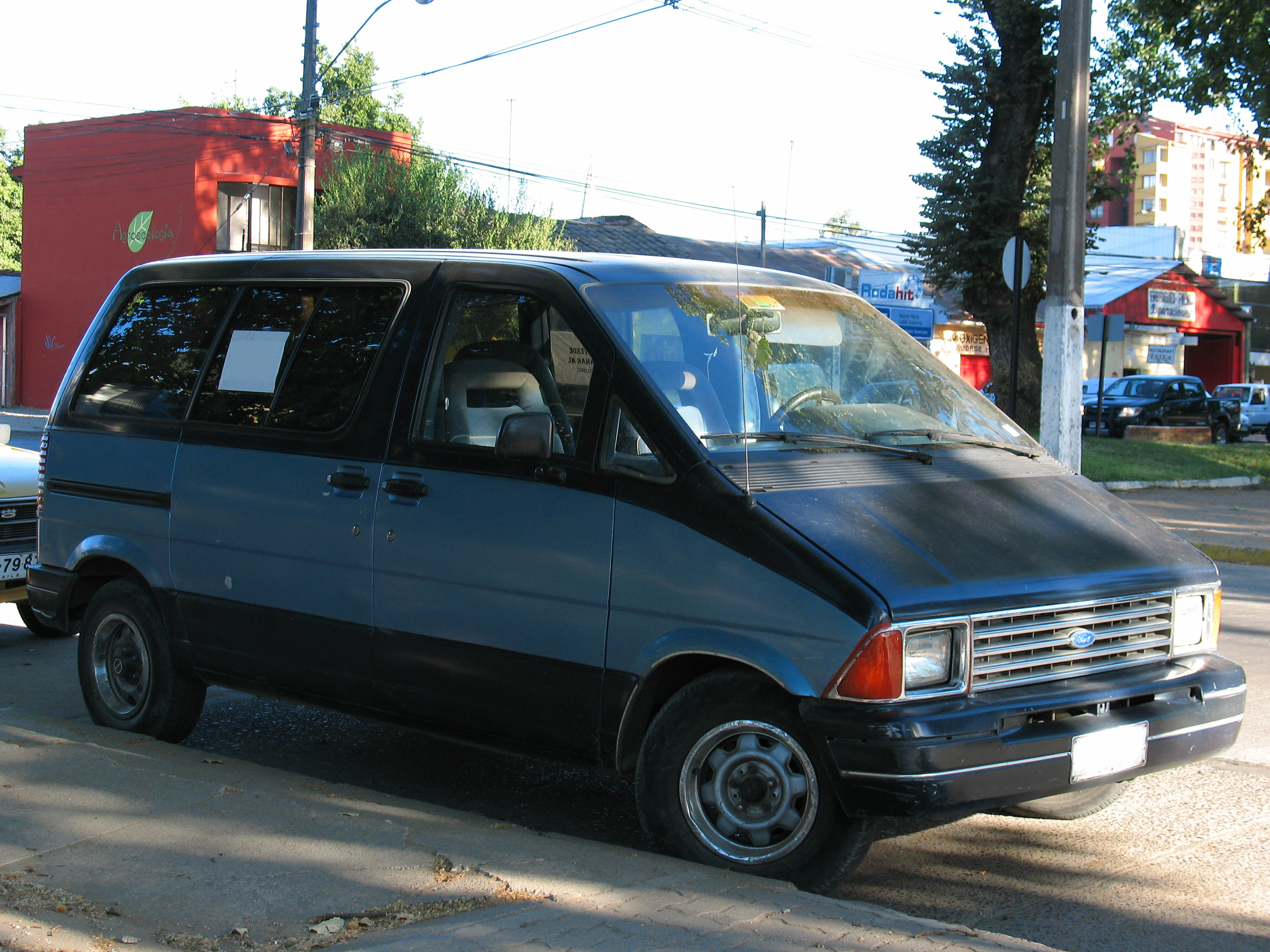
1987 Ford Aerostar XLT

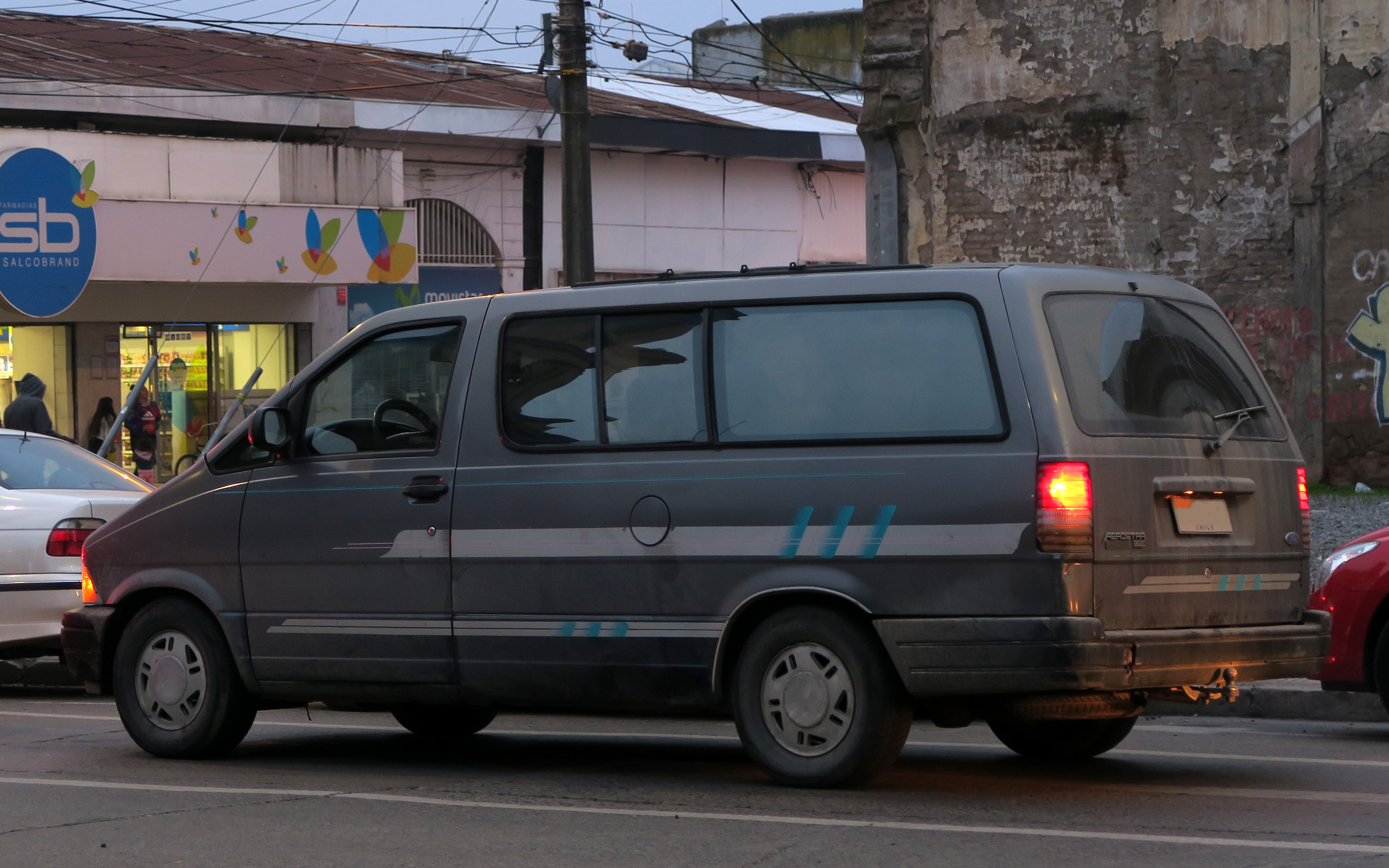
Ford Aerostar rear (1991 XLT)

The Ford Aerostar (developed under Ford model code VN1, the first Ford chassis given an alphanumeric designation) uses a rear-wheel drive chassis configuration. Developed specifically for the model line, the chassis combines unibody chassis construction with full-length frame rails. While using unibody chassis construction to reduce weight, the hybrid frame design provided the Aerostar with a 5,000-pound tow rating (2 1/2 times the Caravan/Voyager, and matching that of the Chevrolet Astro/GMC Safari. The design has been utilized by other widely produced designs in the automotive industry, including the 1971–1996 Chevrolet Van and 1984–2001 Jeep Cherokee XJ.

In a break from Ford light-truck precedent, the Aerostar did not use Twin I-Beam front suspension, instead using unequal-length A-arms and coil springs for the front suspension. The rear suspension was a coil-sprung live rear axle fitted with a three-link configuration (similar to the Ford Panther-platform chassis of the time, though not sharing commonality). During its production, the Aerostar was the only minivan sold in North America with coil springs at all four wheels. Through its production, the model line was fitted with front disc brakes and rear drum brakes.

==== Powertrain details ====
For its 1986 launch, the Aerostar was introduced with two engines shared with the Ranger/Bronco II. A 100 hp 2.3 L inline-4 (also shared with the Mustang) was standard with a 115 hp 2.8 L V6 (from Ford of Europe) offered as an option; as a running change during 1986, the 2.8 L engine was replaced by a 145 hp 3.0 L V6 (shared with the Ford Taurus/Mercury Sable). Initially intended as an option, the four-cylinder turbodiesel of the 1984 concept vehicle was dropped after prototype testing. For 1988, the 2.3 L engine was discontinued, with the 3.0 L V6 becoming the sole engine offering (with the Aerostar becoming the first minivan offering only V6 engines). For 1990, coinciding with the introduction of the E-4WD option, a 160 hp 4.0 L V6 was introduced; the engine was paired with the all-wheel drive system and was an option on higher-trim rear-wheel drive vehicles.

Sharing its transmissions with the Ranger/Bronco II, the Aerostar was available with a five-speed manual until 1995 (nearly exclusively in cargo vans and XL trim); in contrast to Chrysler minivans, all automatic transmissions were 4-speed overdrive units. For 1997, a 5-speed overdrive automatic transmission was introduced for the 4.0 L V6 (a first in the minivan segment).

Engine name	Displacement	Horsepower	Torque	Years available	Notes	Transmissions
Lima inline-4	2.3 L (140 cu in) SOHC I4	100 hp (75 kW)	125 lb⋅ft (169 N⋅m)	1986–1987	Shared with the Ford Ranger and Ford Mustang/Mercury Capri.	5-speed manual: Mazda TK5 (1986–1987); Mazda M5OD (1988–1995); 4-speed automatic: Ford A4LD (1986-1994); Ford 4R44E (1995–1996; Vulcan V6); Ford 4R55E (1995–1996; Cologne V6); 5-speed automatic: Ford 5R55E (1997; Cologne V6)
Cologne V6	2.8 L (170 cu in) OHV V6	115 hp (86 kW)	150 lb⋅ft (203 N⋅m)	1986	Shared with the Ranger and Bronco II, this engine was used only for the first few months of 1986 production. The Aerostar was the last North American Ford to use this variant of the Cologne V6.	5-speed manual: Mazda TK5 (1986–1987); Mazda M5OD (1988–1995); 4-speed automatic: Ford A4LD (1986-1994); Ford 4R44E (1995–1996; Vulcan V6); Ford 4R55E (1995–1996; Cologne V6); 5-speed automatic: Ford 5R55E (1997; Cologne V6)
Vulcan V6	3.0 L (182 cu in) OHV V6	145 hp (108 kW)	165 lb⋅ft (224 N⋅m)	1986–1997	Shared with the Taurus/Sable and Tempo/Topaz, the Aerostar was the first rear-wheel drive application of the Vulcan V6. The Vulcan V6 was the only engine for the 1988–1989 Aerostar.	5-speed manual: Mazda TK5 (1986–1987); Mazda M5OD (1988–1995); 4-speed automatic: Ford A4LD (1986-1994); Ford 4R44E (1995–1996; Vulcan V6); Ford 4R55E (1995–1996; Cologne V6); 5-speed automatic: Ford 5R55E (1997; Cologne V6)
Cologne V6	4.0 L (245 cu in) OHV V6	160 hp (119 kW)	220 lb⋅ft (298 N⋅m)	1990–1997	Shared with the Ranger and Explorer, the 4.0 L Cologne V6 was optional in rear-wheel drive versions and standard in all-wheel drive examples.	5-speed manual: Mazda TK5 (1986–1987); Mazda M5OD (1988–1995); 4-speed automatic: Ford A4LD (1986-1994); Ford 4R44E (1995–1996; Vulcan V6); Ford 4R55E (1995–1996; Cologne V6); 5-speed automatic: Ford 5R55E (1997; Cologne V6)

==== All-wheel drive system (1990–1997) ====
During the 1990 model year, Ford introduced an all-wheel drive system for the Aerostar, called E-4WD (Electronic 4-Wheel Drive). Developed specifically for the model line, the E-4WD system was offered from 1990 to 1997 on XLT and Eddie Bauer trims. In contrast to the four-wheel drive systems in other Ford light trucks, E-4WD was not configured nor intended for off-road driving. While no low-range gearing was provided, the system provided increased traction in adverse weather conditions without driver input.

The E-4WD system used a Dana TC28 transfer case with a center differential (regulated by an electronically controlled electro-magnetic clutch); all four wheels received traction at all times. To accommodate the added weight and friction losses, the system was paired with the higher-torque 4.0L V6 and automatic transmission.

Following the 1997 discontinuation of the model line, Ford did not offer all-wheel drive as an option for North American-market vans until the 2020 Transit.

=== Body design ===
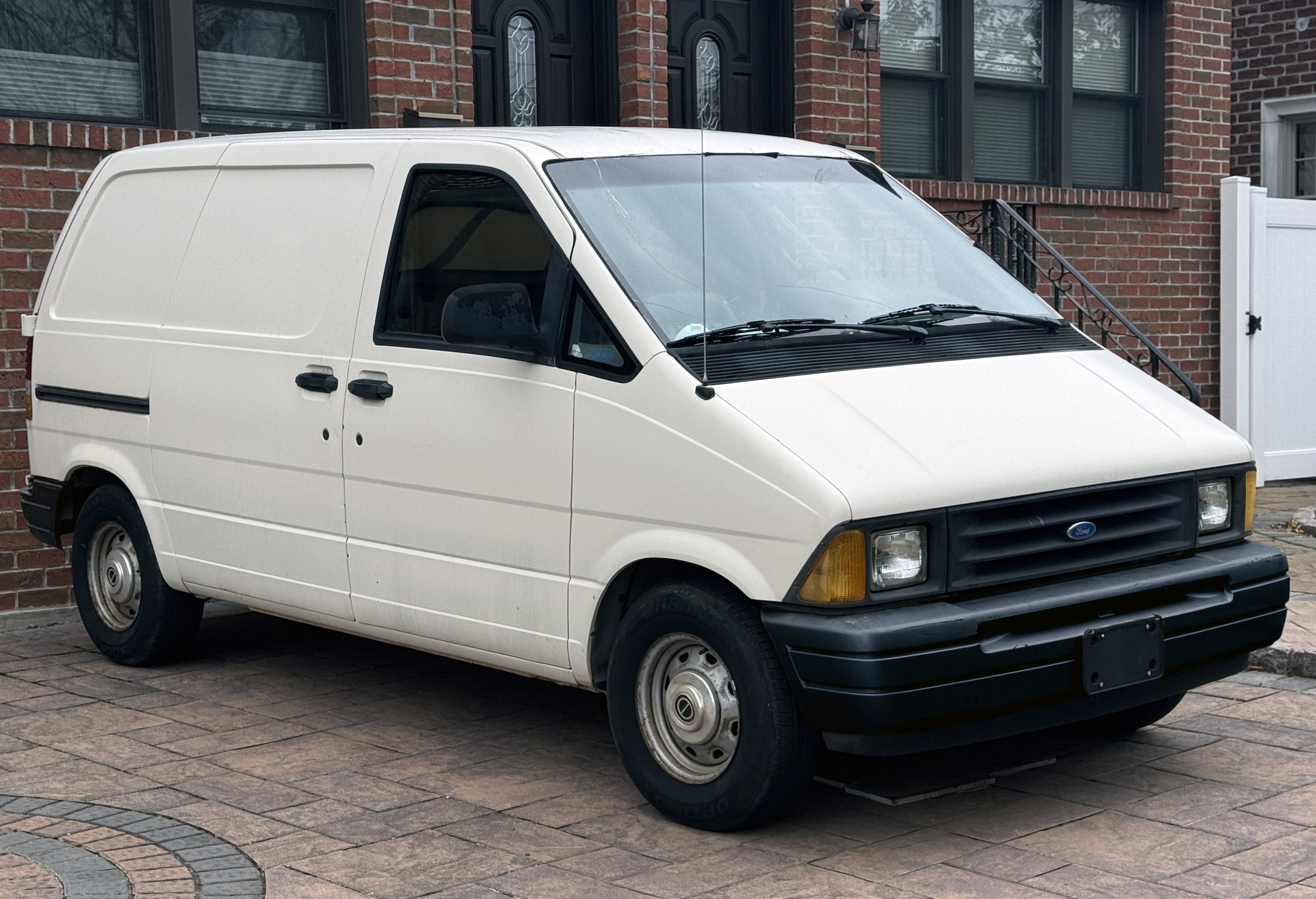
1990 Aerostar Cargo Van

Distinguished by its sloped-nosed design, the Ford Aerostar utilized a "one-box" design similar to the European Ford Transit and Renault Espace; in contrast to its European counterparts, the long wheelbase of the Aerostar placed the wheels near the corners, minimizing body overhangs. In an effort to further improve its fuel efficiency and aerodynamics (and lower its curb weight), multiple plastic body parts from the 1984 concept car were adopted by the production vehicle, including the bumper covers, fuel tank, and rear hatch.

==== Exterior ====
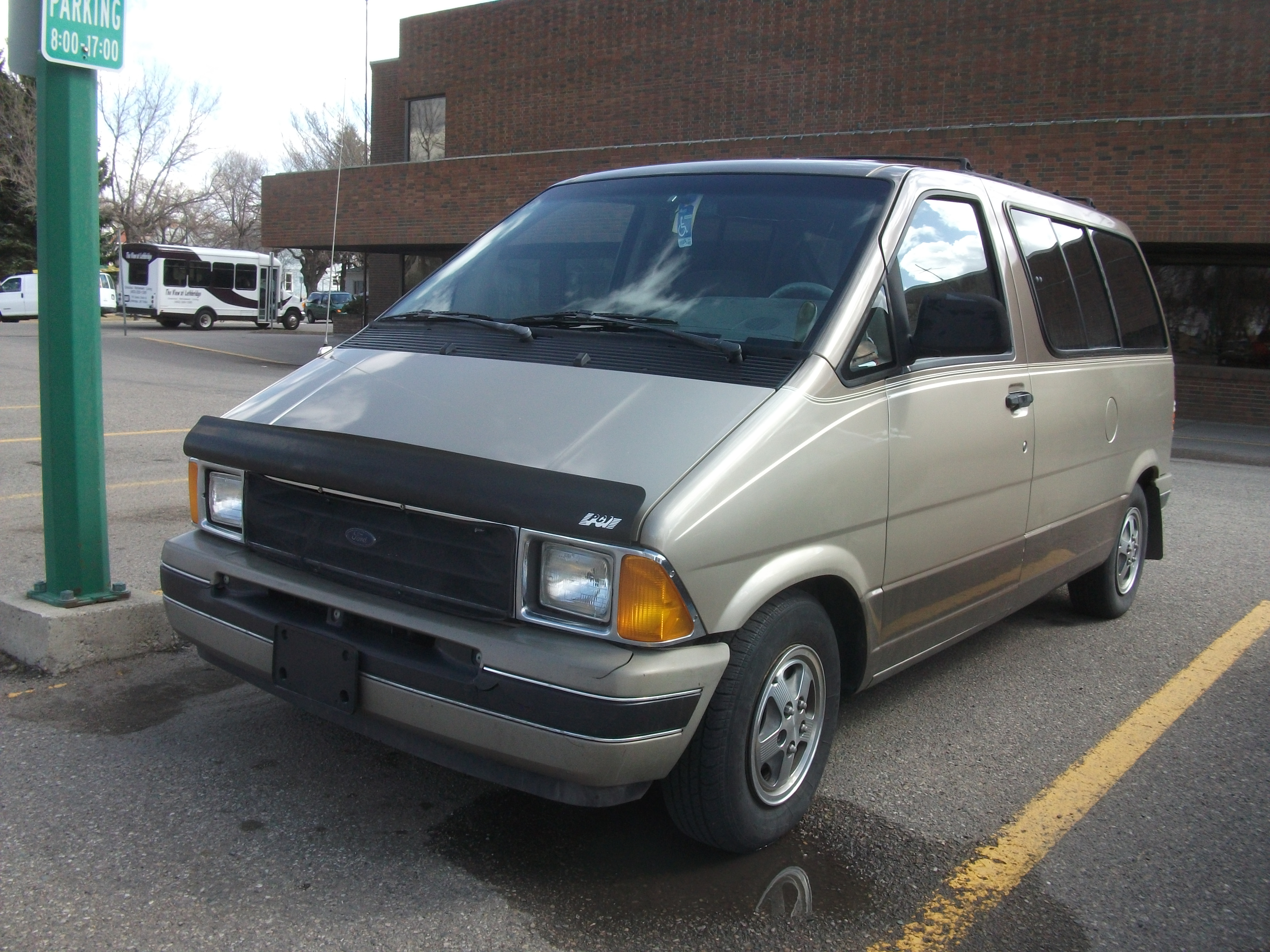
1989–1991 Aerostar XLT

For 1988, the exterior saw a minor detail change to exterior badging, relocating it from both fenders to the tailgate; it was also changed from chrome to silver in color. In another revision, the "V6" and "Electronic Fuel Injection" badges were deleted (as both features were now standard).

As a response to the Dodge Grand Caravan and Plymouth Grand Voyager, Ford released an (unnamed) extended-length version of the Aerostar for the 1989 model year. Extending the rear body 14 inches in length, the option shared the 119-inch wheelbase with the standard-length body. During the 1990s, the extended-length Aerostar would become the most popular version of the vehicle.

For 1989, the exterior was updated for the first time, with the chrome grille replaced by a black-trim grille; bracketed towing mirrors were replaced by power-operated mirrors.

For 1992, the Aerostar received its second (and most substantial) exterior update. The grille was changed slightly in color from 1989 to 1991, with the Ford Blue Oval relocated from the center to the top slot of the grille (similar to the Ford Explorer); Ford replaced the sealed-beam headlights with replaceable-bulb composite units (and clear-lens turn-signal lenses). While remaining 14 inches in size, nearly all versions of the Aerostar received restyled wheels.

In anticipation of withdrawing the model line after 1994, few changes were made to the Aerostar after 1992. To comply with federal regulations, the body received a center brake light for 1994. For 1997, the taillamps were revised for the first time (with the deletion of the amber turn signal lenses); XLT-trim vehicles received newly designed 14×6" seven-hole alloy wheels.

==== Interior ====
In contrast to its contemporary one-box exterior design, the Ford Aerostar adopted many industry-standard features in its interior design. Sharing the same 2-2-3 seven-passenger layout of its Chrysler and GM competitors, XLT and Eddie Bauer-trim vehicles were offered with optional second-row bucket seats (a feature popularized from full-size conversion vans). Another option allowed both rear bench seats to fold down (making a bed); both rows of rear seats were removable.

However, the interior also adopted several European-influenced design features. At its launch, the Aerostar used a floor-mounted shifter for both its manual and automatic transmissions; it was equipped with a handbrake (which remains a feature in all US-market Ford minivans). In a fashion similar to the Volkswagen Vanagon, the second-row windows slid open. While cupholders were relegated to an optional armrest in the third-row seats (and a later console on the engine cover), the vehicle could be specified with up to two cigarette lighters and six ashtrays.

For 1992, the interior underwent a revision alongside the exterior. Coinciding with the addition of a driver-side airbag (and three-point seatbelts for all six outboard seats), the dashboard underwent a complete redesign. Both analog and digital instrument panels were replaced by more legible units; the controls were improved (many shared with the redesigned 1992 Econoline), introducing a column-shift automatic transmission. For 1993, integrated child safety seats were introduced as an option.

=== Trim ===
Along with a cargo van (distinguished by its available double rear doors and lack of side windows), the Aerostar passenger van (called the Wagon) came in two trim levels: base-trim XL and deluxe-trim XLT (in keeping with the Ford truck line). Many features standard on the XLT were available as extra-cost options on the XL, such as power windows, mirrors, and locks; air conditioning; and privacy glass.

XLT-trim Wagons also included the following features as extra-cost options:

- Overhead trip computer with auto-dimming rearview mirror (featuring Distance to Empty (English/Metric), Trip Mileage, Average Fuel Economy, Instant Fuel Economy, Average Speed (English/Metric), along with dual map lights)
- Rear climate control
- Second-row Captain's chairs (quad seats)
- Fold-flat second and third-row bench seatbacks
- 8-speaker AM/FM stereo with cassette player
- Premium AM/FM/cassette sound system with 7-band equalizer and rear-seat headphone jacks
- Rear-wheel anti-lock brakes
- Electronic four-wheel drive (see section)
- Two-tone paint
- 14-inch aluminum wheels

==== Eddie Bauer Wagon (1988–1994) ====
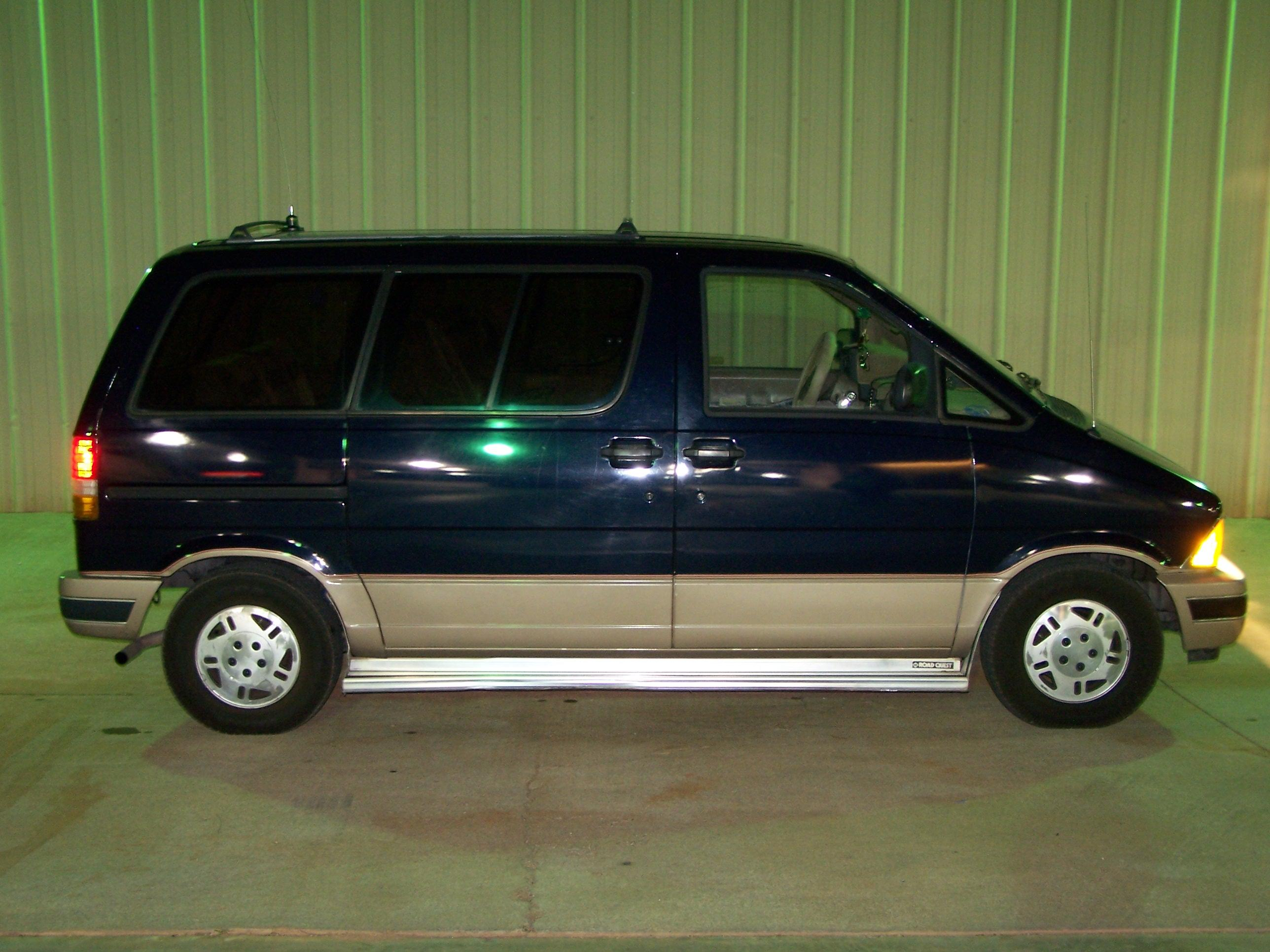
1989 Ford Aerostar Eddie Bauer

Introduced during the 1988 model year, the Aerostar was one of the first Ford vehicles to feature the outdoors-themed Eddie Bauer brand as a trim package. Marketed above the XLT, the Aerostar Eddie Bauer was the first minivan marketed towards luxury buyers (for 1988, the Chrysler Town & Country was produced as a compact station wagon, not becoming a minivan until the 1990 model year).

The Eddie Bauer trim combined the interior convenience features of the XLT trim with two-tone exterior paint (tan as the accent color on the rocker panels and wheel trim) and a tan outdoors-themed interior. As on the XLT, cloth seating surfaces were standard; as part of the 1992 update, leather seats became an option. A standard feature of the trim package (an option on the XLT) was a feature allowing the second and third row bench seats to fold flat into a large bed across the rear half of the interior. However, a large number of Eddie Bauer Aerostars were ordered with the optional second-row bucket seats/captain's chairs.

Following the introduction of the extended-length wagon in 1989, the Eddie Bauer trim was available in both body configurations. After 1989, the option package came with the 4.0L V6 standard, though buyers could choose between rear-wheel drive and all-wheel drive powertrains.

After the 1994 model year, the Eddie Bauer trim was discontinued as the Aerostar trim line was consolidated to the cargo van and the Aerostar XLT.

==== Aerostar Sport (1992–1996) ====
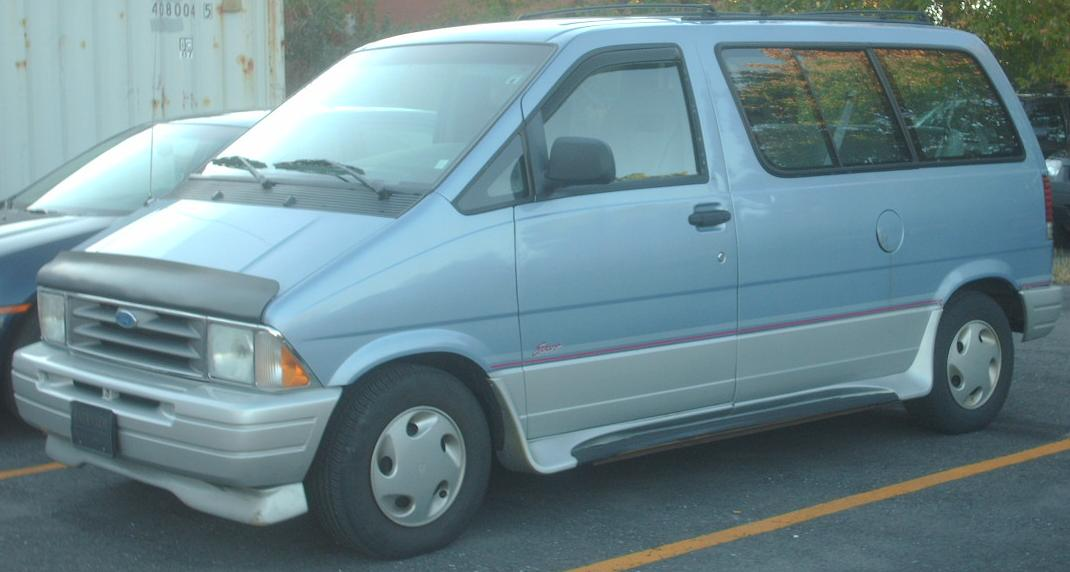
1992–1996 Ford Aerostar XL Sport

In 1992, the Aerostar Sport was introduced as an option package available for any non-Eddie Bauer Aerostar Wagon. Similar to its Chevrolet Astro RS/GMC Safari CS and Dodge Caravan ES counterparts, the Aerostar Sport was largely a cosmetic upgrade. Distinguished by their silver-accented paint and "Sport" pinstriping, the Sport featured integrated running boards with a color-matched front air dam and color-matched rear mud flaps. On darker colors, the front grille and chrome was painted body color.

The trim version of an Aerostar Sport is most easily identified by its wheels: XL Sport Wagons, with full wheel covers; XLT Sport Wagons (less common), with aluminum wheels.

== Concept vehicles ==
=== Ford Aerostar (1984) ===
The Aerostar name was first revealed on a 1984 concept vehicle. Serving as a close preview of the production model line, the 1984 Ford Aerostar was one of the most aerodynamic vehicles designed by Ford (at the time); with a drag coefficient of Cd=0.37, the Aerostar was sleeker than the Ford Mustang SVO and the Lincoln Continental Mark VII.

The front-engine configuration of the Aerostar was chosen for multiple reasons. In its research, Ford found that potential buyers preferred the configuration over rear and mid-engine vehicles (used by German/Japanese imported vans). The rear-wheel drive platform was engineered with class-leading payload and towing capacity over front-wheel drive minivans, with a 2000-pound payload and 5000-pound tow rating (2½ times the capacity of the Chrysler minivans).

In the change from concept to production, very little of the exterior design would change, except for the window glass, headlights, and grille. In a notable change, the turbodiesel engine option (projected to provide up to 40mpg), was dropped from the engine lineup before production.

=== HFX Aerostar Ghia (1987) ===
Introduced at the 1987 Frankfurt Auto Show, the HFX (High Feature Experimental) Aerostar Ghia was a prototype of future minivan design. Two running prototypes were built from the collaboration of Ford and Ghia; both used the stock 3.0L Vulcan V6 and A4LD automatic transmission.

The HFX concept borrowed some features used in other Ford vehicles, such as four-wheel air suspension and electronic climate control. From there, some of the technologies showcased in the HFX had never before been seen in a minivan; this included run-flat tires, adjustable pedals, power-sliding side doors, electric power steering, ABS, traction control, seatbelt pretensioners, and movable grille shutters. On the rear, an LCD was installed for the use of displaying 12 pre-programmed warning messages.

== Awards ==
The Aerostar was named Motor Trend magazine's Truck of the Year for 1990.

== Discontinuation ==
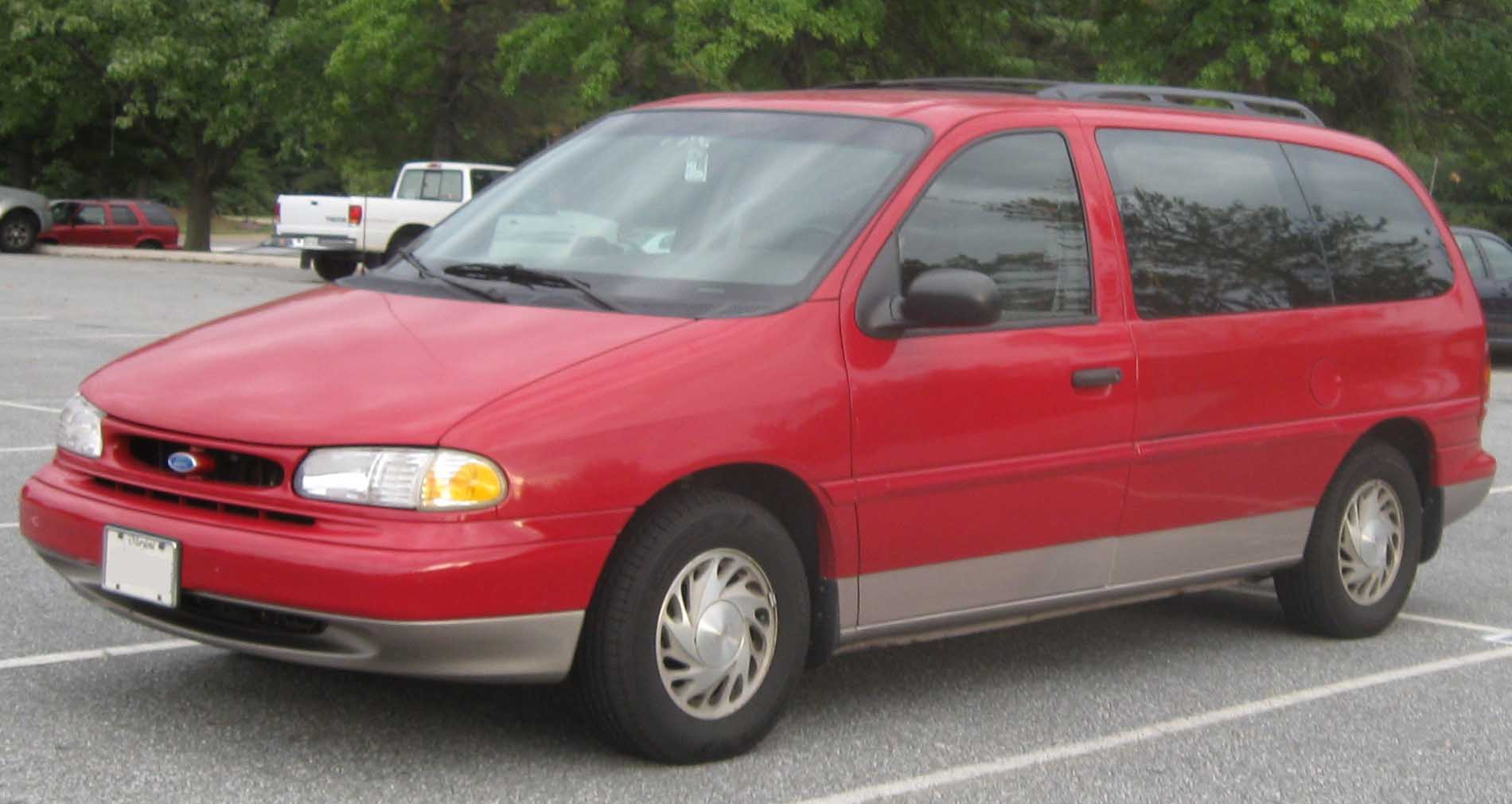
1995 Ford Windstar

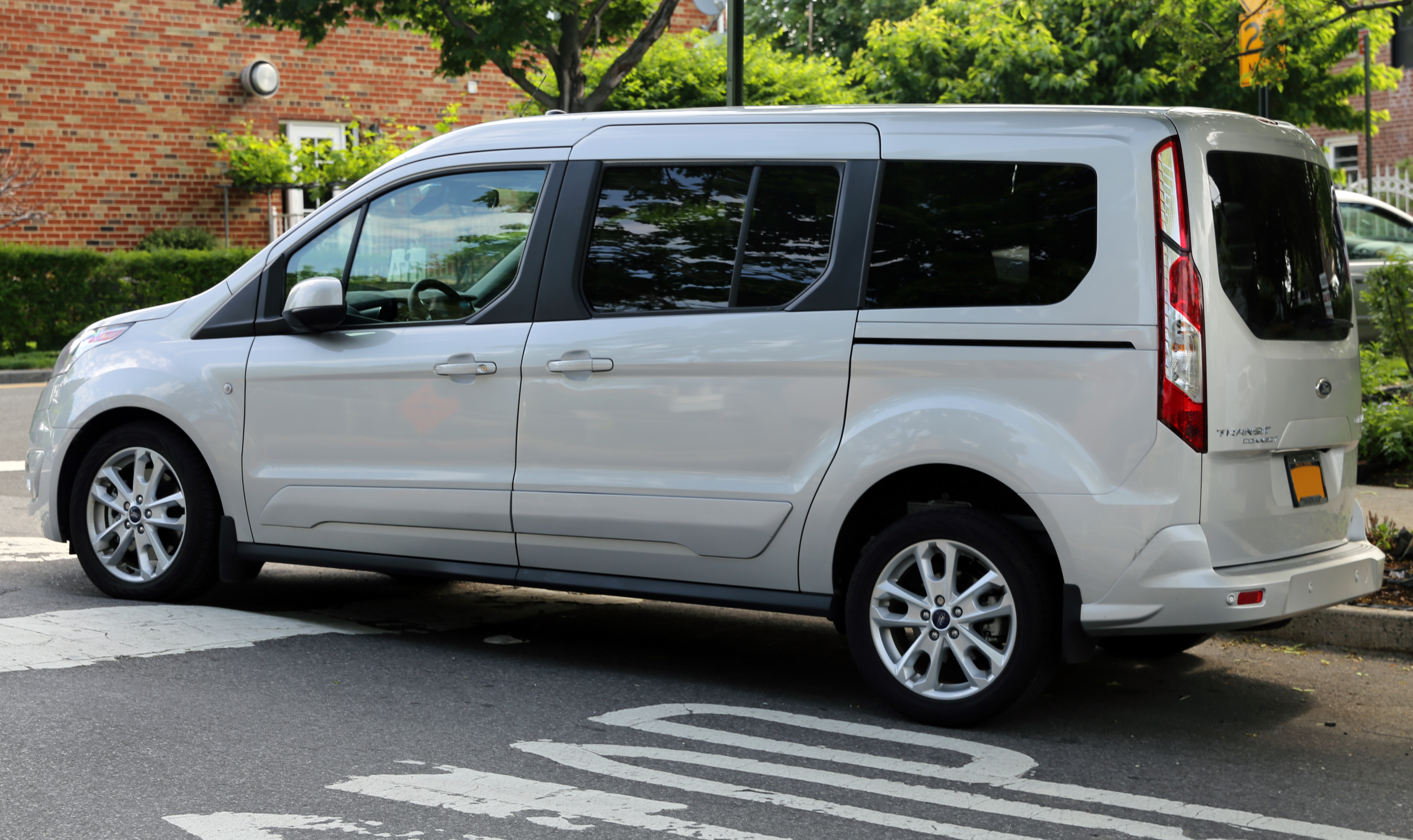
Ford Transit Connect Wagon, final-generation Ford minivan in North America

Although the Ford Aerostar sold well, the minivan market segment was dominated by Chrysler minivans in the late 1980s. In 1988, Ford commenced design work on a successor to the Aerostar for a planned 1993 introduction. To compete more directly against Chrysler, what was to become the Ford Windstar adopted the form factor of the long-wheelbase Chrysler minivans and conceptually similar front-wheel drive sedan underpinnings, developed alongside the 1996 Ford Taurus.

With the Ford Windstar being readied for a 1995 model-year introduction, 1994 was set to be the final year for the Aerostar. As with the planned replacement of the third-generation Ford Mustang with the dissimilar front-wheel-drive Ford Probe in the late 1980s, negative reactions from Ford dealers and the public prompted Ford to instead sell the Aerostar and Windstar side-by-side.

On March 17, 1997, Ford announced the discontinuation of the Ford Aerostar, alongside the Ford Aspire, Ford Probe, and Ford Thunderbird/Mercury Cougar. The final vehicle rolled off the St. Louis assembly line on August 22, 1997; a total of 2,029,577 were produced over 12 years. Alongside the production of the Ford Windstar, a primary factor leading to the cancellation of the Ford Aerostar was an impending requirement for the addition of dual airbags (set to take effect on September 1, 1997), which would have required a complete (and costly) redesign of the front dashboard and front crash structure.

The Ford Windstar (and later Ford Freestar) was offered in a cargo van configuration, but the first direct successor to the Aerostar Van, in terms of size and capability, is the Ford Transit Connect. Imported into North America since 2010, the front-wheel drive Transit Connect is also offered in passenger configurations; a 2014 redesign led to the first seven-seat Ford minivan since 2007.
