= Panther Lima =

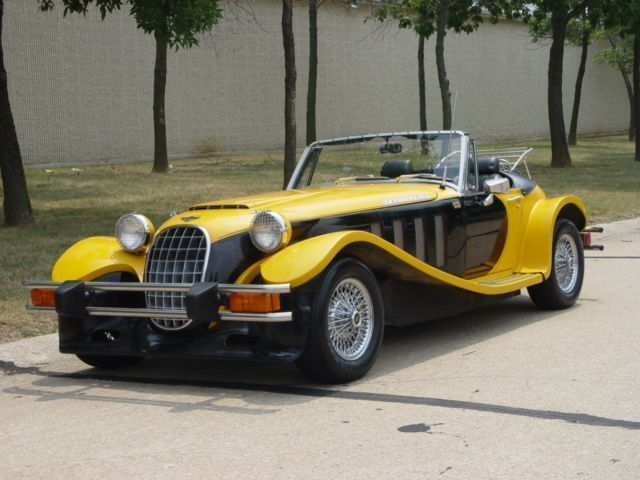

Overview
- Manufacturer: Panther Westwinds
- Production: 1976–1982; 897 produced
- Assembly: United Kingdom: Weybridge, England
- Designer: Bob Jankel

Body and chassis
- Body style: 2-door Sports cabriolet
- Related: Vauxhall Magnum

Powertrain
- Engine: 2279 cc Vauxhall I4; 2279 cc Vauxhall turbo I4
- Transmission: 4-speed manual (Vauxhall); 3-speed automatic

Dimensions
- Wheelbase: 97 in (2,464 mm)
- Length: 142 in (3,607 mm)
- Width: 63.4 in (1,610 mm)
- Height: 48.3 in (1,227 mm)
- Curb weight: 1,803 lb (818 kg)

Chronology
- Predecessor: Panther Brooklands
- Successor: Panther Kallista

The Panther Lima is a retro-styled roadster built in the 1970s built by Panther Westwinds. It used Vauxhall Viva and Magnum mechanicals, including that car's 2.3 L (2279 cc) engine. The later Mark II model used a purpose-built chassis. The body was made of fibreglass in a roadster style reminiscent of an Allard or Morgan. The fibreglass bodies were manufactured by Industrial Marine Fibreglass based in Newton Abbot, Devon. By the standards of small scale manufacturers, the Lima was produced in volume, with over 500 built by the time of the introduction of the Lima Turbo in February 1979.

A four-speed manual was standard, with an automatic transmission available as an option. The Turbo Lima was fitted with 14-inch alloy wheels, and had a TURBO graphic on the bonnet. The turbocharged version, with an engine developed in Southern California, had 178 hp (133 kW) rather than the 108 hp (81 kW) of the original and claimed a 0–100 km/h (62 mph) acceleration time of less than six seconds.

Production lasted from 1976 to 1982, with 897 cars produced. It was replaced by the similar Panther Kallista for the 1980s.

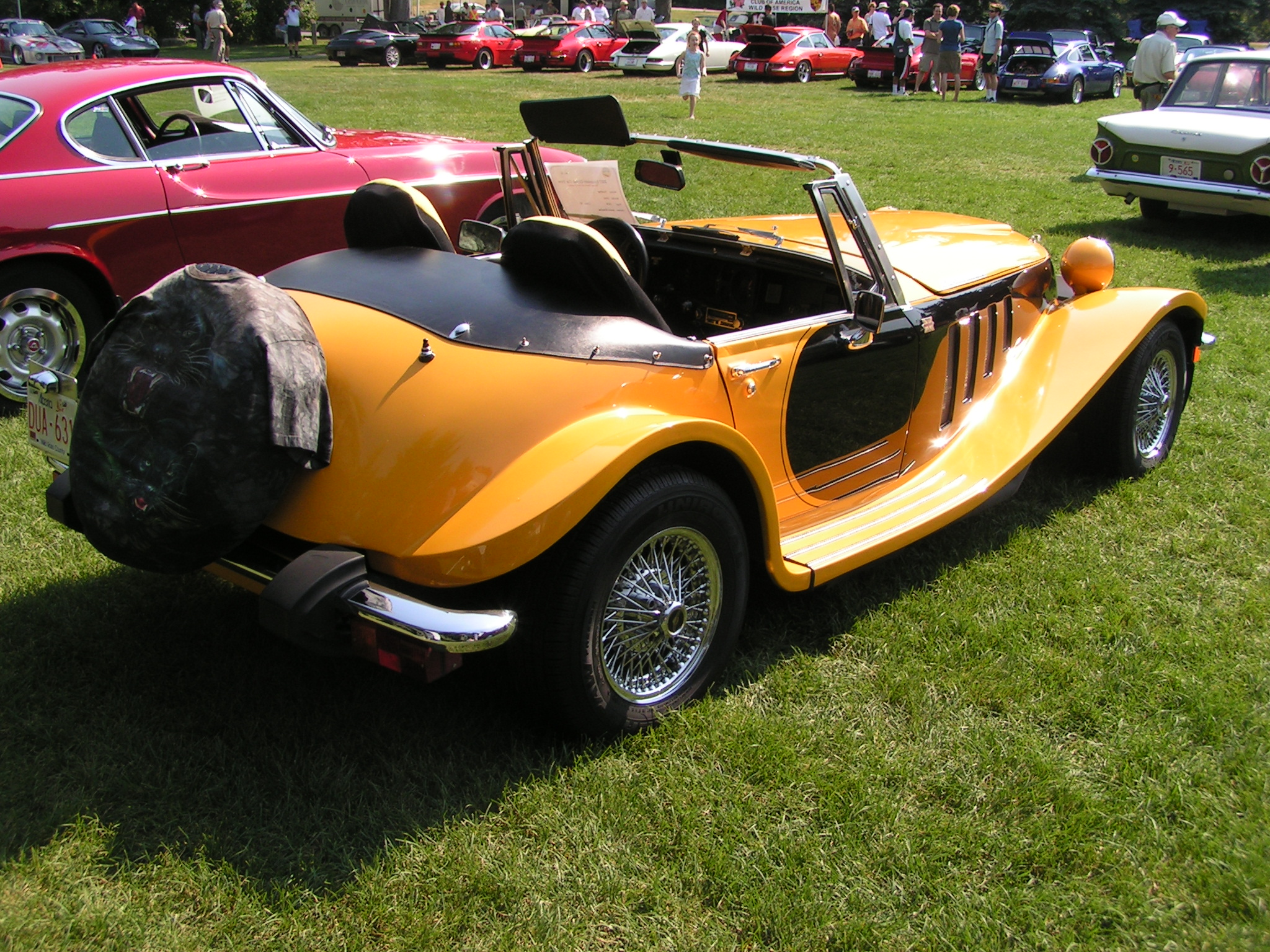
1979 Panther Lima Turbo rear view
