= Panther Kallista =

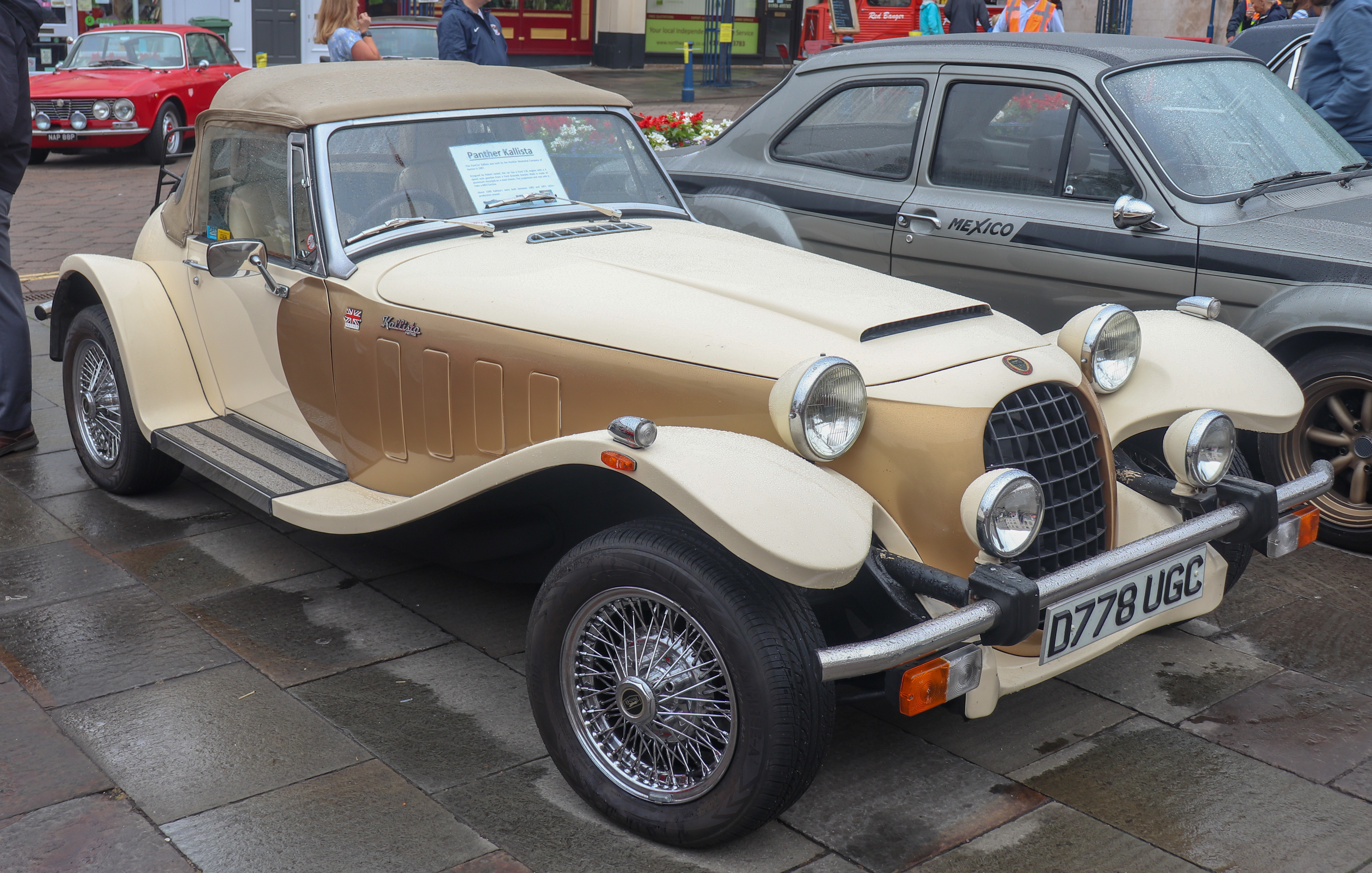
- Panther Kallista

Overview
- Manufacturer: Panther
- Also called: SsangYong Kallista (1991–1993)
- Production: 1982–1993
- Assembly: United Kingdom: Weybridge, England
- Designer: Robert Jankel

Body and chassis
- Body style: 2-door roadster
- Layout: FR layout

Powertrain
- Engine: 1.6 L Ford CVH I4; 2.0 L Ford N9A DOHC I4; 2.8 L Ford Cologne V6; 2.9 L Ford Cologne V6
- Transmission: 4-speed manual 5-speed MT75 manual 3-speed automatic

Dimensions
- Wheelbase: 100.4 in (2,550 mm)
- Length: 151.6 in (3,851 mm)
- Width: 66.5 in (1,689 mm)
- Height: 50.0 in (1,270 mm)
- Curb weight: 2,127 lb (965 kg)

Chronology
- Predecessor: Panther Lima

The Panther Kallista is an automobile produced by Panther Westwinds from 1982 to 1990, and later by SsangYong until 1993. It replaced the Lima as Panther's volume model for the 1980s.

Unlike the Vauxhall-based Lima, the Kallista used Ford mechanicals, including a range of engines from the 1.6-litre CVH straight-four to the 2.9 L Cologne V6. Like its predecessor, it featured styling resembling earlier Allard and Morgan cars.

The Kallista used an aluminium body over a purpose-built steel chassis and could accelerate from 0–60 mph (0–97 km/h) in under 8 seconds.

A Kallista appears in the 1987 film Timestalkers.

== SsangYong ==
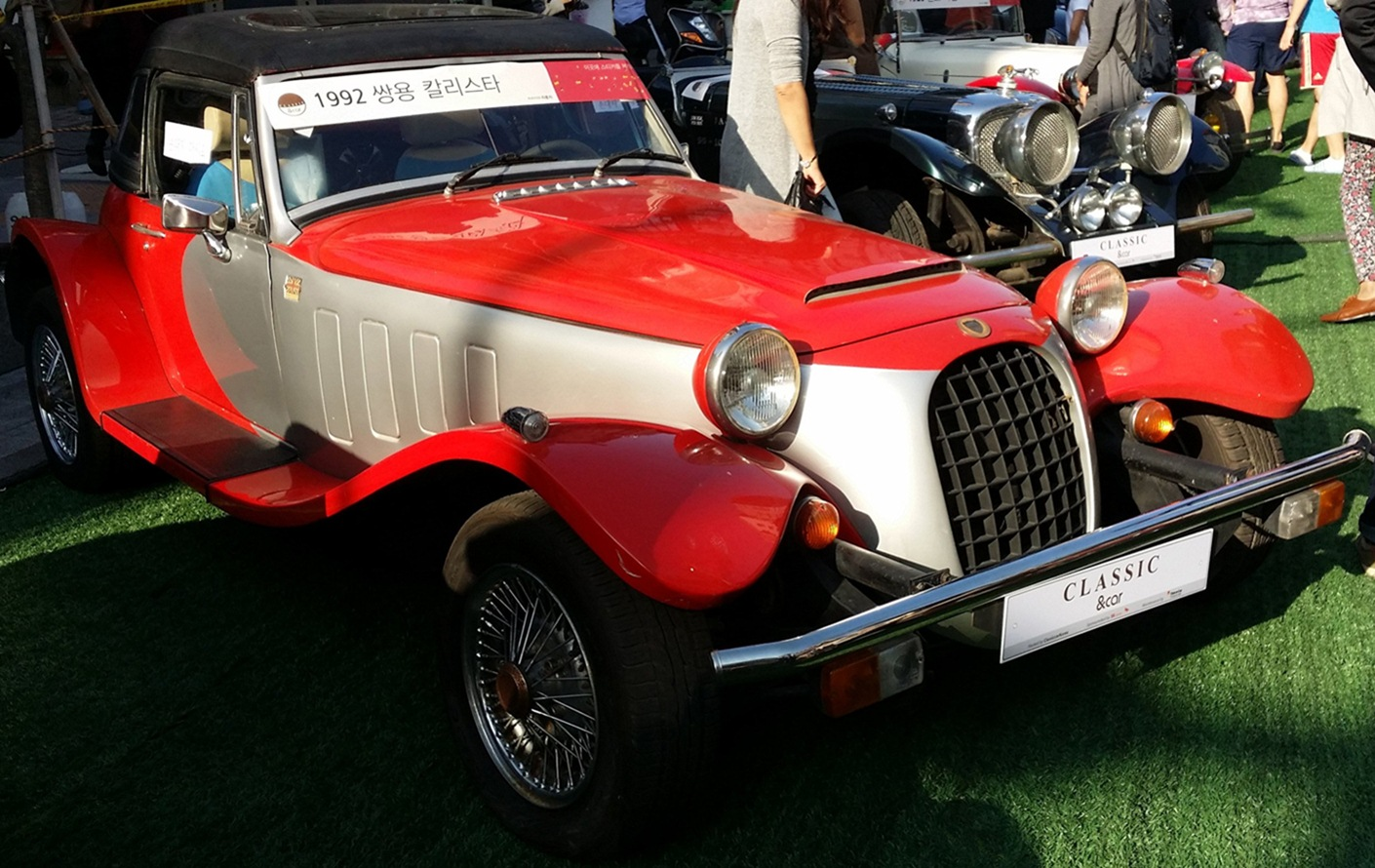
1992 SsangYong Kallista

SsangYong Motor Company released a badge engineered version in 1991 called the SsangYong Kallista. Production by SsangYong ended in 1993, with only 77 models built.

The SsangYong-built models used only the 2.0L DOHC 8V N9A and 2.9i V6 engines. They used a GKN Salisbury rear axle and MT75 Ford 5-speed manual gearboxes, with the 2.9i also assembled with an automatic transmission. An aluminium body was an extra option, with glass fiber reinforced plastic being the standard. The bodies by Ssangyong are 10 cm wider than early Harlow models.

== Gallery ==
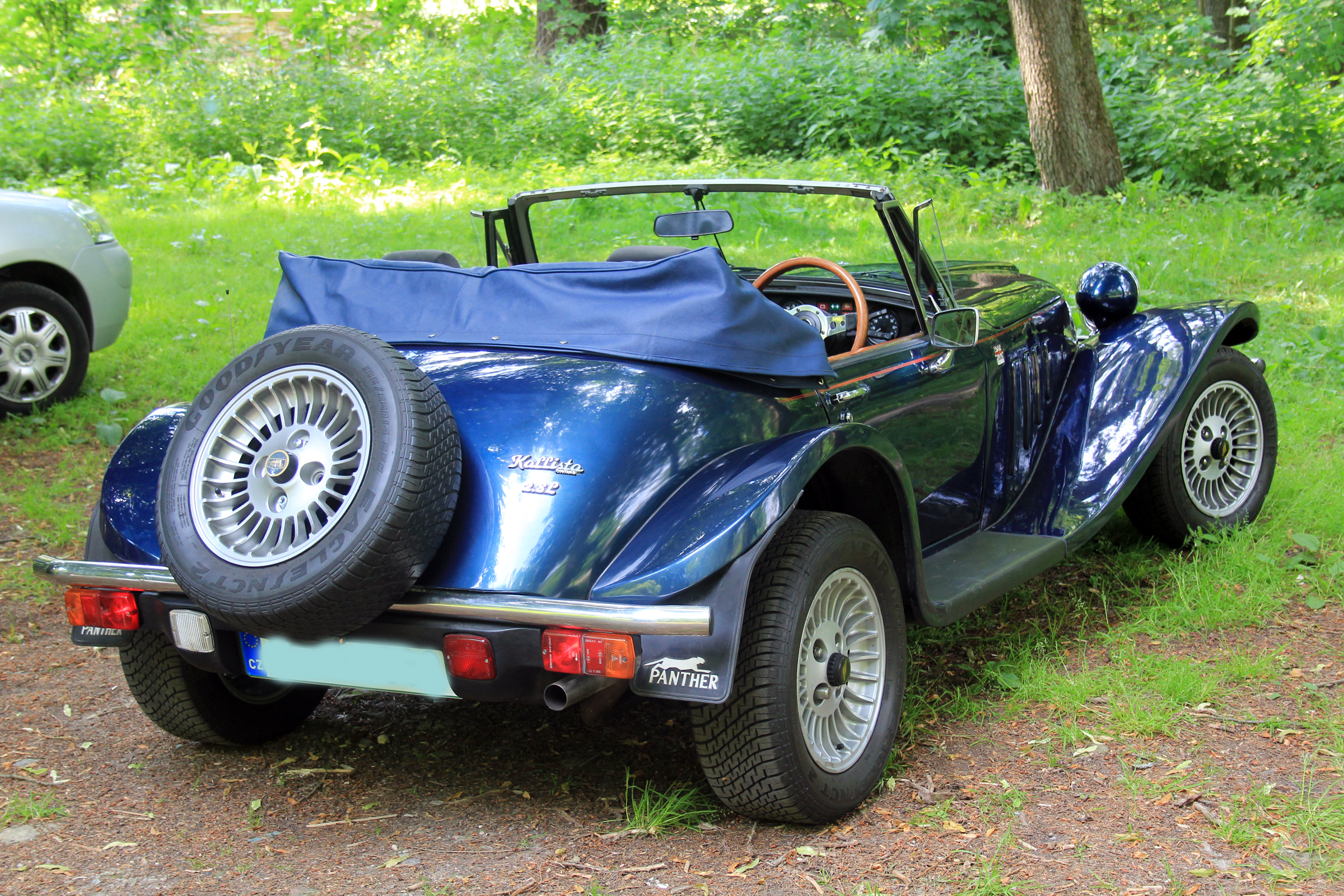
Panther Kallista 2.8L rear

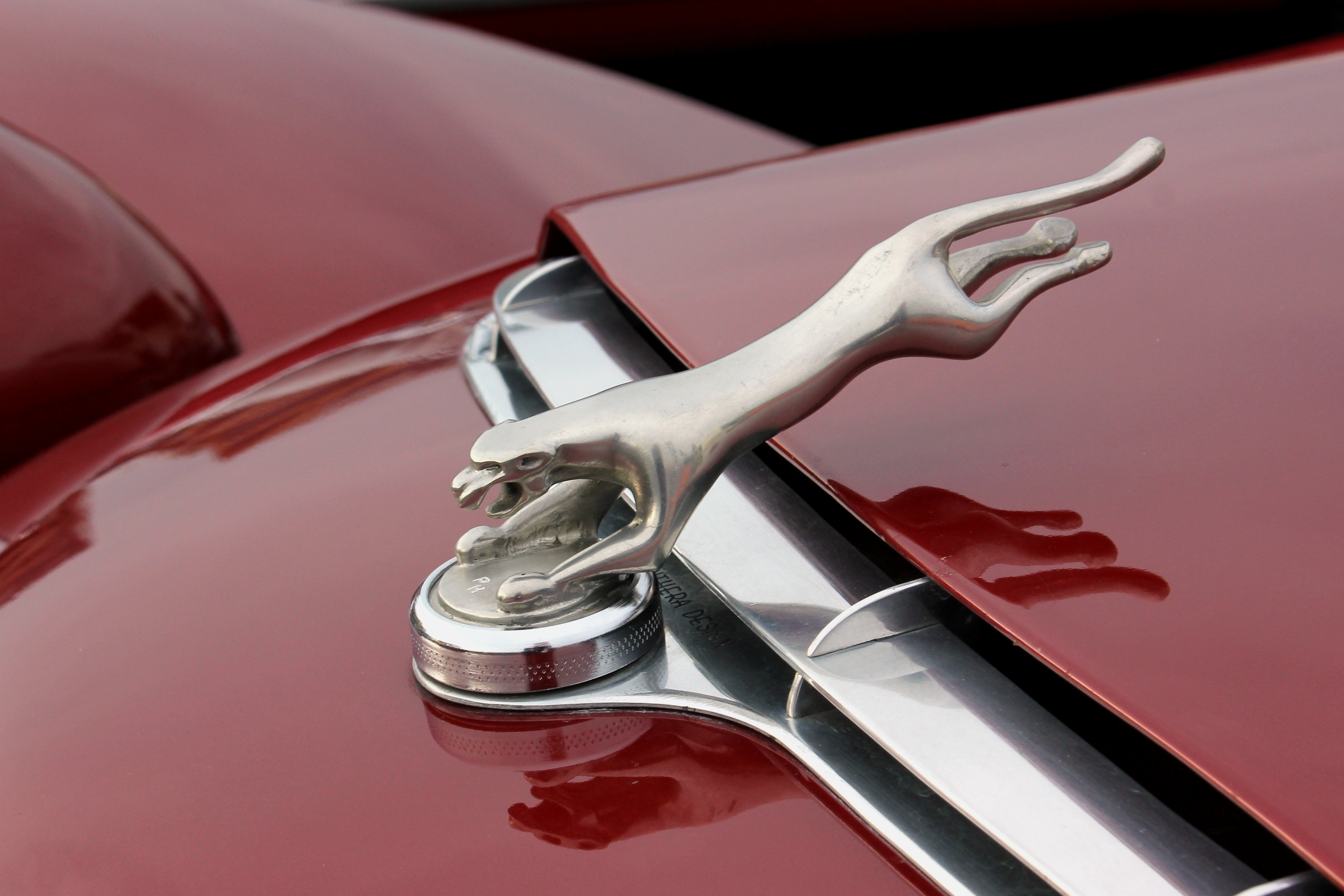
Kallista hood ornament

== Sources and further reading ==
- Media related to Panther Kallista at Wikimedia Commons
