= Ford Bridgend Engine Plant =

Factory in Bridgend, Wales

Bridgend Engine Plant
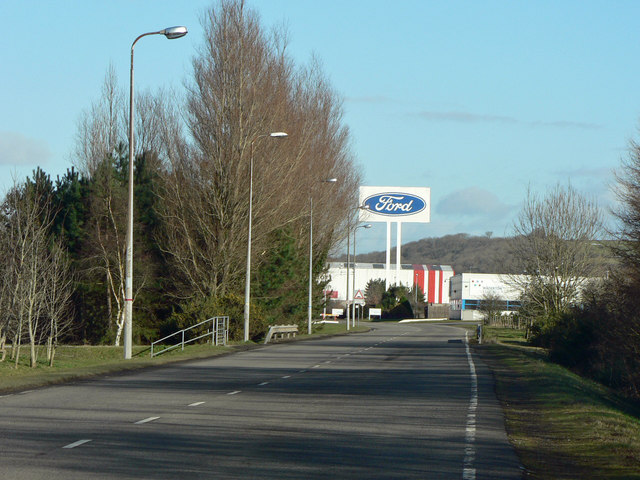
- Approach road to the Ford Engine Plant, 2009
- Built: 1980
- Location: Bridgend, Wales, United Kingdom
- Coordinates: 51.494049°N 3.534508°W
- Industry: Automotive
- Products: CVH engine (1980–2000); Zetec-E (Zeta) engine (1992–2004); EcoBoost engine (2009–2020)
- Employees: 1,700
- Area: 1,525,270 square feet (141,702 m^{2})
- Owner: Welsh Government
- Defunct: 25 September 2020; 6 years ago

The Ford Bridgend Engine Plant was an internal combustion engine factory owned by Ford of Europe and located in Bridgend, Wales. Between 1980 and 2020, it made over 22 million engines used in Ford, Volvo, Jaguar and Land Rover cars.

The plant's last Ford engine was the "Dragon" EcoBoost engine, produced from 2018 until February 2020. During its final months, it only made Jaguar AJ-V8 and AJ-V6 engines, themselves discontinued in September 2020.

Amid a global cost-cutting drive and citing a lack of demand for its manufacturing capacity, Ford closed the plant on 25 September 2020.

== Construction ==
After signing an investment deal with the Welsh Development Agency, construction was started on the greenfield site in 1977. The 1,525,270 square feet (141,702 m^{2}) plant began production in 1980, and specialised in producing high-efficiency petrol engines. Its first product was the CVH engine used in the then new third generation European Escort of that year.

== Jaguar engine plant ==
Jaguar Land Rover had a plant-within-a-plant at Bridgend, which saved considerable investment costs by JLR. Staffed by workers dedicated to Jaguar production of the AJ-V8 engine, it included a linked flow-line of computer numerically controlled machines with automated loading and assembly. Component supply was on a just-in-time manufacturing basis. JLR moved the production of its engines to its new Wolverhampton plant in September 2020.

== Final years ==
At the start of 2015, the Bridgend plant had an annual production capacity of 750,000 engines, including 250,000 for Jaguar Land Rover, and employed a total of 2,137 people. The Volvo SI6 engine made there was discontinued in March that year, with its replacement to be made elsewhere; the plant's Ford engines were expected to end production "in the next few years." Production of the Jaguar engines was then expected to end in 2018, with their replacements also made elsewhere. This left the plant redundant by 2018 in the absence of new work.

=== Dragon engine retooling ===
In the 2000s, Ford's strategy to reduce its vehicles' tailpipe pollution ahead of its eventual transition to battery electric vehicles was to invest in more efficient engines rather than hybrid drivetrains. To this end, they designed a series of small, direct-injected, turbocharged engines branded "EcoBoost."

The 2012 "Fox" EcoBoost, a straight-three with a displacement of 1.0 litre (61 cu in), producing up to 90 kW (120 PS), was introduced in 2012 and won International Engine of the Year in the sub-1.0-litre category every year until 2017. Hoping to repeat the Fox's success for heavier and sportier vehicles, Ford designed a scaled-up version with a displacement of 1.5 litres (91 cu in), producing up to 150 kW (200 PS), which they named "Dragon."

Ford of Europe conducted a review to decide where to build the Dragon, with the choice of plants in Bridgend, Cologne, Craiova (Romania), and Valencia. In March 2015 it endorsed Bridgend to the Ford corporate office. The initial plan was to invest £181 million (US$277 million) to retool the factory for an annual production capacity of 250,000 engines, a third of the plant's existing capacity. The Welsh Government provided a £15M investment grant to support the retooling. Making the Dragon was expected to employ around 500 people.

The Dragon engine did not repeat the success of the Fox. The engine was too large for Ford's Fiesta and Ka, was difficult to mate with larger models designed to accept four-cylinder engines, and was not suited to Ford's mild hybrid drivetrain design. By 2017, Ford's planned investment had been cut by 45% to £100M ($129M), for a 125,000-unit annual capacity. In 2019, in an Autocar feature that forecast final-year production of only 80,000 units, Dr Peter Wells of Cardiff Business School said, "Ford’s product planning has just gone wrong."

Amid Ford's global cost-cutting programme, downsizing plans leaked in January 2019 called for phased redundancies at the Bridgend plant totalling 990 by 2021. This would have left around 700 employees, 40% more than previously expected to be employed for the Dragon, but a fall of two thirds from 2015. Ford also said at the time that it would consider plant closures.

=== Closure ===
By mid-2019, according to Wells, the Bridgend plant had become clearly uneconomic due to its under-utilisation, in turn arising from lack of demand for the engines made there.

Ford decided against manufacturing batteries at Bridgend due to the plant's distance from their vehicle assembly factories, which are all located outside the United Kingdom, hence beyond a customs frontier from January 2021 as a result of the UK's exit from the EU.

In the first half of 2019, Honda and Jaguar Land Rover had already announced UK job losses, and Nissan had cancelled a planned investment in the UK.

Ford failed to find a buyer for the site. Ineos expressed interest in acquiring the plant to build its Grenadier offroader, but later announced that it would build a new factory adjacent to Ford's. It eventually acquired a former Mercedes-Benz factory in Hambach, France instead, despire owner .

The Welsh Government, which later said it had "strained every sinew" and met "very regularly" with Ford to try to avert the closure, created a taskforce to try to save the plant, but it did not officially convene for over eight months between July 2018 and March 2019. An offer of state aid, similar to the £61M awarded to Nissan in 2018, was refused.

In June 2019, Ford briefed trade unions that the plant would close in September 2020, with production of the Dragon engine to end in February 2020. The decision prompted a threat of strike action by members of Unite the Union, and a protest outside Ford's UK headquarters by fifty-five members of the Bridgend male voice choir. Neither succeeded in reversing it.

Ford of Europe's president stated that the decision was unrelated to the United Kingdom's planned 2021 withdrawal from the European Union Customs Union. The then Member of Parliament for Bridgend considered this unlikely, saying that Ford executives had repeatedly warned that the withdrawal "would make it impossible to operate here".

The Ford Bridgend plant closed on 25 September 2020, with decommissioning expected to be complete a few months later.

=== Aftermath ===
The plant's closure was a significant blow to the economy of Bridgend, which in December 2019 had an estimated GDP per capita 6% below the EU average. The Ford plant was the town's biggest employer. Its 1,700 workers earned an average of £41,000, 70% above the local average salary. It was estimated to support around 12,000 other jobs, and was also the largest business ratepayer in Bridgend, contributing £1.6M in 2019–20.

Redundancy and pension payments, described to the Guardian as "the most generous [their source] had ever seen," were estimated at $650M (£510M as of 2019). Ford was also to repay £11M of the £15M Welsh Government grant supporting its failed 2015 investment in the plant.

A taskforce, sponsored jointly by the Welsh Economy Minister and the Secretary of State for Wales, was convened on 1 July 2019 to support former Ford employees in Bridgend.

Fifty employees were transferred to other Ford sites, while by the time of closure "most" had taken retraining offered by the company.

== Future of the factory site ==
In June 2024, a planning application was submitted to Bridgend County Borough Council by new owners of the site Vantage Data Centres, to demolish all the remaining structures at the former factory, with the intention of constructing a data centre on the site.

== Former products ==
The plant formerly produced the following engines:

- CVH engine (1980–2000), used in the then new third generation Escort
- Zetec-E (Zeta) engine (1992–2004)
- Volvo SI6 engine (2006–2015)
- "Dragon" EcoBoost engine (2018–2020)
