= Frank L. Engle =

American artist

- Born: June 9, 1916; Peoria County, Illinois, U.S.
- Died: February 20, 2002 (aged 85); Tuscaloosa, Alabama, U.S.
- Education: Indiana University's Herron School of Art and Design; University of California, Los Angeles
- Occupations: Professor, painter, sculptor, glass artist
- Spouse: Bethany Windham

Frank L. Engle (June 9, 1916 - February 20, 2002) was an American artist and educator from Alabama. A professor of Art at the University of Alabama, he was an oil and watercolor painter, a ceramic and metal sculptor, a printmaker, and a glass artist. In 1949 he was commissioned by the Ford Motor Company to design a new crest for the company's post World War II vehicle redesign. The crest debuted on the 1950 Ford line.

Along with his wife, fellow artist Bethany Windham Engle, he was the subject of a retrospective at the Dinah Washington Cultural Arts Center on the campus of the University of Alabama in 2017. The Engle Art Gallery, LLC in Greensboro, Alabama is named in honor of the Engles.

For more information on Frank L. Engle see Encyclopedia of Alabama.
