= Ford Forty-Nine =

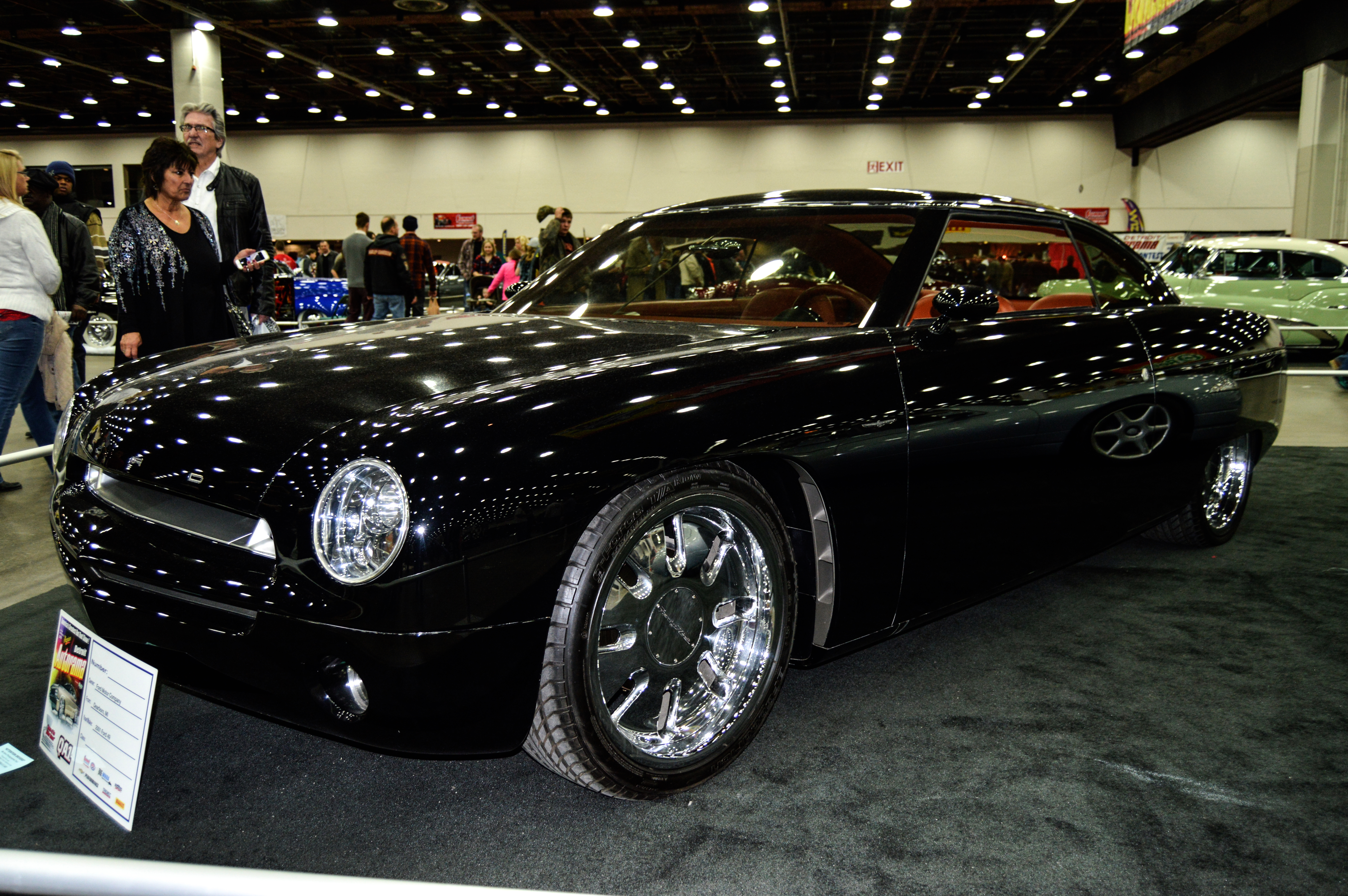
- Ford Forty-Nine coupe

Overview
- Manufacturer: Ford
- Production: 2001; 2 built
- Designer: Chip Foose

Body and chassis
- Class: Concept car
- Body style: 2-door coupe 2-door convertible
- Layout: FR layout
- Platform: Ford DEW98

Powertrain
- Engine: 3.9 L Jaguar AJ-V8 engine
- Transmission: 5-speed automatic

The Ford Forty-Nine was a concept manufactured by Ford Motor Company. The car was designed by Chip Foose (himself commissioned by J Mays) and introduced at the 2001 North American International Auto Show — as a tribute to the 1949 Ford.

== Design and features ==
Designed by Chip Foose (under commission of J Mays), the Forty-Nine was a modern interpretation of the 1949 Ford. The coupe featured a full-length glass roof along with its black exterior paint job. The interior featured a full-length console and four individual, contoured bucket seats in contrasting orange and black leather.

Ford also presented a non-drivable convertible variant of the Forty-Nine, finished in red with a red textile top, as a static display. Ford retained the convertible until it sold the display to a private collector in 2010.

== Powertrain ==
The Forty-Nine's engine was the 3.9L DOHC 32-valve Jaguar AJ-V8 used on the Ford Thunderbird. Power was sent to the rear wheels through a 5-speed automatic.

== Notes ==
- 2001 Ford 49 Info from ConceptCarz.com
