= 1949 Ford =

1949 Ford (1949–1951)
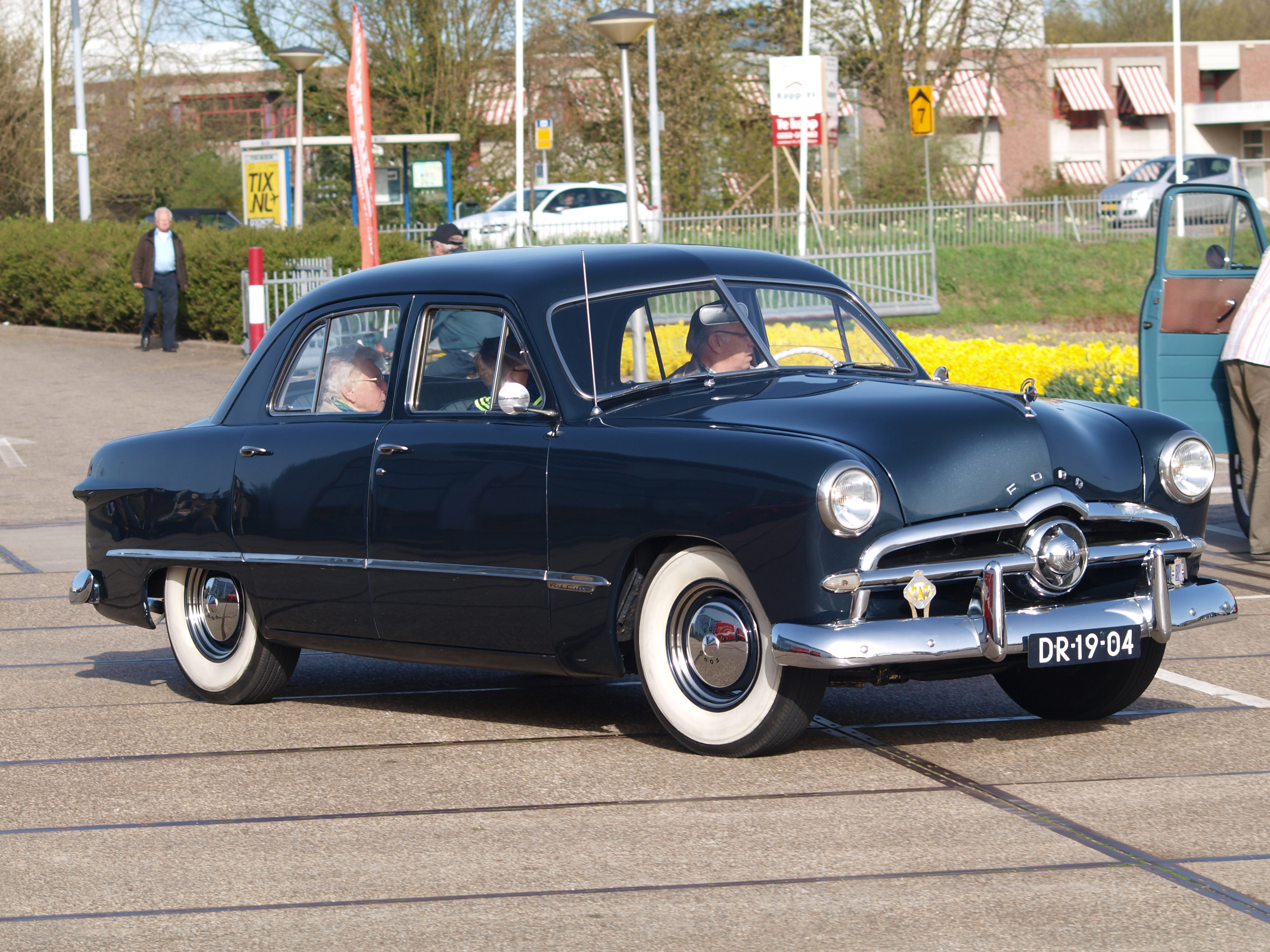
- 1949 Ford Custom Four door Sedan

Overview
- Manufacturer: Ford
- Production: 1948–1951
- Model years: 1949–1951
- Assembly: United States: Dearborn, Michigan (Ford River Rouge Complex); Branch Assembly; Twin Cities, MN; Somerville, MA; Richmond, CA; Norfolk, VA; Memphis, TN; Louisville, KY; Long Beach, CA; Kansas City, MO; Edgewater, NJ; Dallas, TX; Chicago, IL; Chester, PA; Buffalo, NY; Atlanta, GA; Worldwide: Norlane, Victoria, Australia (Geelong Stamping); Singapore, Malaysia (Ford Motor Company of Malaya)

Body and chassis
- Class: Full-size Ford
- Body style: 2-door sedan (Tudor); 4-door sedan (Fordor); 2-door coupe (Club Coupe); 2-door business coupe 2-door hardtop (Victoria); 2-door convertible 2-door station wagon (Country Squire); 2-door coupé utility (Australia only)
- Layout: FR layout
- Related: Meteor (Canada); Mercury Eight; Monarch (Canada); Lincoln EL-series; Lincoln Cosmopolitan

Powertrain
- Engine: 226 CID (3.7 L) L-head I6; 239 CID (3.9 L) Flathead V8
- Transmission: 3-speed sliding-mesh manual 3-speed Ford-O-Matic automatic transmission (1951)

Dimensions
- Wheelbase: 114 in (2,896 mm)
- Length: 196.8 in (4,999 mm)
- Width: 71.7 in (1,821 mm)
- Curb weight: 3,110–3,770 lb (1,410–1,710 kg)

Chronology
- Predecessor: 1941 Ford
- Successor: 1952 Ford

The 1949 Ford is a line of cars produced by Ford from the 1949 to 1951 model years. The successor to the prewar 1941 Ford, the model line was the first full-size Ford designed after World War II and was the first Ford car line released after the deaths of Edsel Ford and Henry Ford. Coinciding with the 1948 release of the Ford F-Series, the 1949 Ford was offered solely as a car.

Released in June 1948, the 1949 Ford was the first "postwar" car line released by the American Big Three, beating Chevrolet to market by six months and Plymouth by nine. From 1946 to 1948, American automakers concentrated on the restoration of production, initially releasing updates of their 1941-1942 model lines.

In response to its design, the generation would be called the "Shoebox Ford", denoting its slab-sided "ponton" design. While the design theme had been in use since the late 1920s to streamline automobiles, the 1949 Ford marked its widest-scale use, removing running boards entirely and integrating front and rear fenders into a single, smooth body form. In other firsts, this generation marked the first use of keyed ignition and the first automatic transmission option in Ford vehicles. For 1950, Ford introduced stand-alone model nameplates. The same year, the Ford crest emblem made its first appearance; designed by artist Frank L. Engle, the crest emblem was used (in various forms) through the 1991 model year.

Ford assembled the 1949 Ford line in its central Ford River Rouge complex (Dearborn, Michigan) and in 14 other branch facilities across the United States.

== Model overview ==
For 1949, the Ford car line was redesigned from the ground up; only the powertrain and 114-inch wheelbase were retained from the 1941-1948 generation.

The Ford adopted a drop-center ladder frame; to further modernize its design, the transverse-leaf front and rear suspension (a feature in use since the Model T) was retired, replaced by a coil spring independent front suspension and longitudinal rear leaf springs. The torque tube driveshaft was replaced by a more universally-used Hotchkiss drive shaft.

Carried over from the previous generation, a 226 cubic-inch L-head inline-6 was the standard engine with an optional 239 cubic-inch Flathead V8.

== Model history ==
The 1949 Ford debuted at a gala at the Waldorf-Astoria Hotel in New York City in June 1948, with a carousel of the new model line complemented by a revolving demonstration of the new chassis; the new integrated steel structure was advertised as a "lifeguard body". Though wood was again used for external body panels, the "woody" station wagon adopted a steel inner body structure. To increase its body rigidity, the frame of the convertible received an "X member" reinforcement.

=== 1949 ===
Alongside the redesign of the car, Ford updated its model nomenclature for 1949. Richard Caleal is credited with shaping its design, which he presented to the Ford Executive Committee. The previous Custom, De Luxe, and Super De Luxe names were replaced by new Standard and Custom trims, with Tudor and Fordor sedans (two-door and four-door, respectively), fastback Club Coupe and Business Coupe (the latter, rear seat delete), Convertible Club Coupe, and two-door Station Wagon styles. In the center of the "Bullet-nose" grille emblem, Ford embossed either a "6" or an "8" on top of a red circle, denoting the fitment of an inline-6 or V8 engine.

While using a different body than Lincoln-Mercury, Ford Motor Company used ponton styling across all three of its divisions for 1949, with the Ford sharing similar styling as the Mercury Eight and the Lincoln. The center-mounted "Bullet-nose" grille became a styling element adopted by Studebaker for the 1950 facelift of the Studebaker Starlight. During the 1950s, the slab-sided exterior design would go on to influence many European manufacturers, including Mercedes Benz, Borgward, Austin, Volvo and many others.

For 1949, Ford returned to first place among American manufacturers, selling 1,118,740 Ford cars. While bolstered by an extended 16-month model year, the 1949 Ford was met with success.

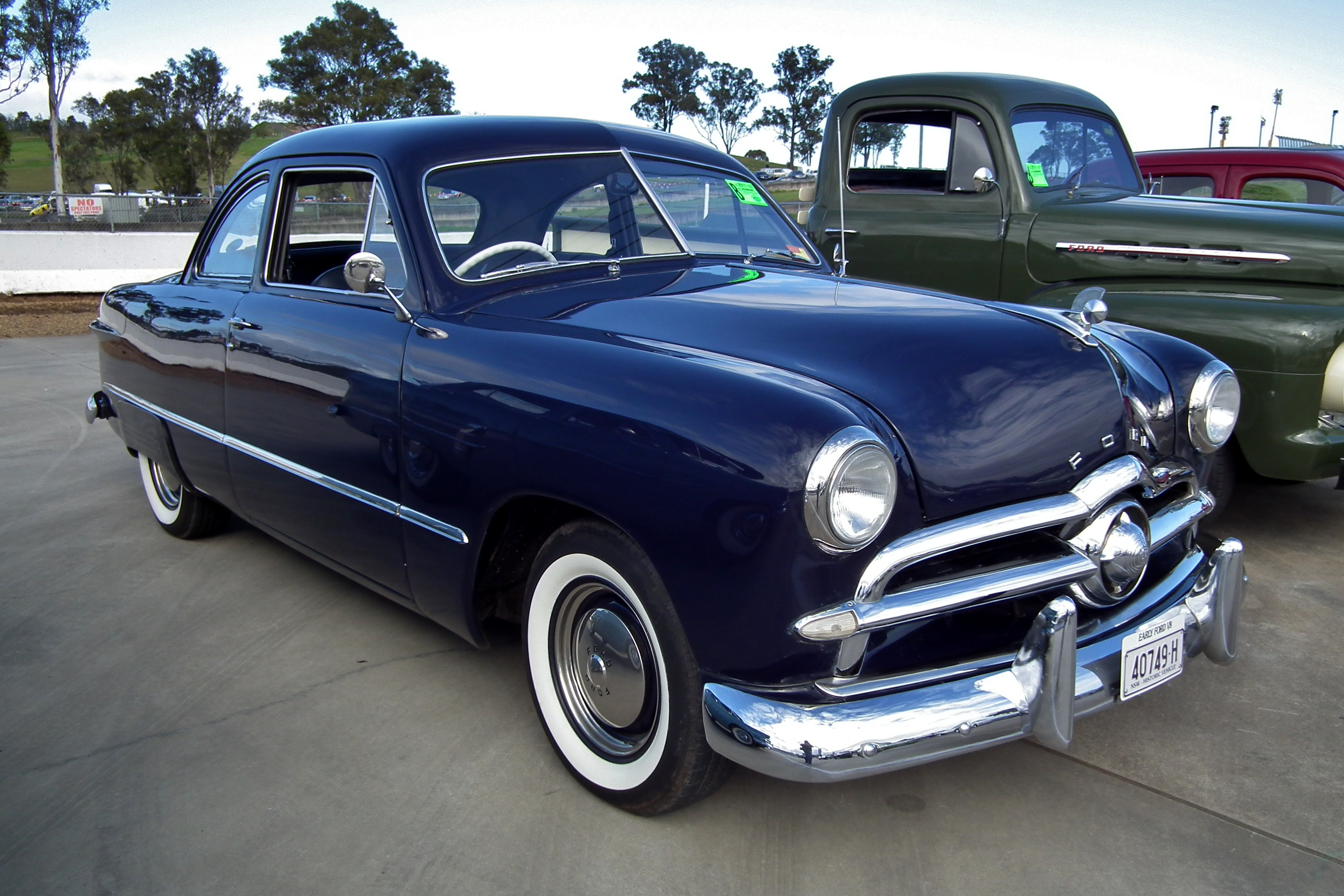
1949 Ford Standard Coupe

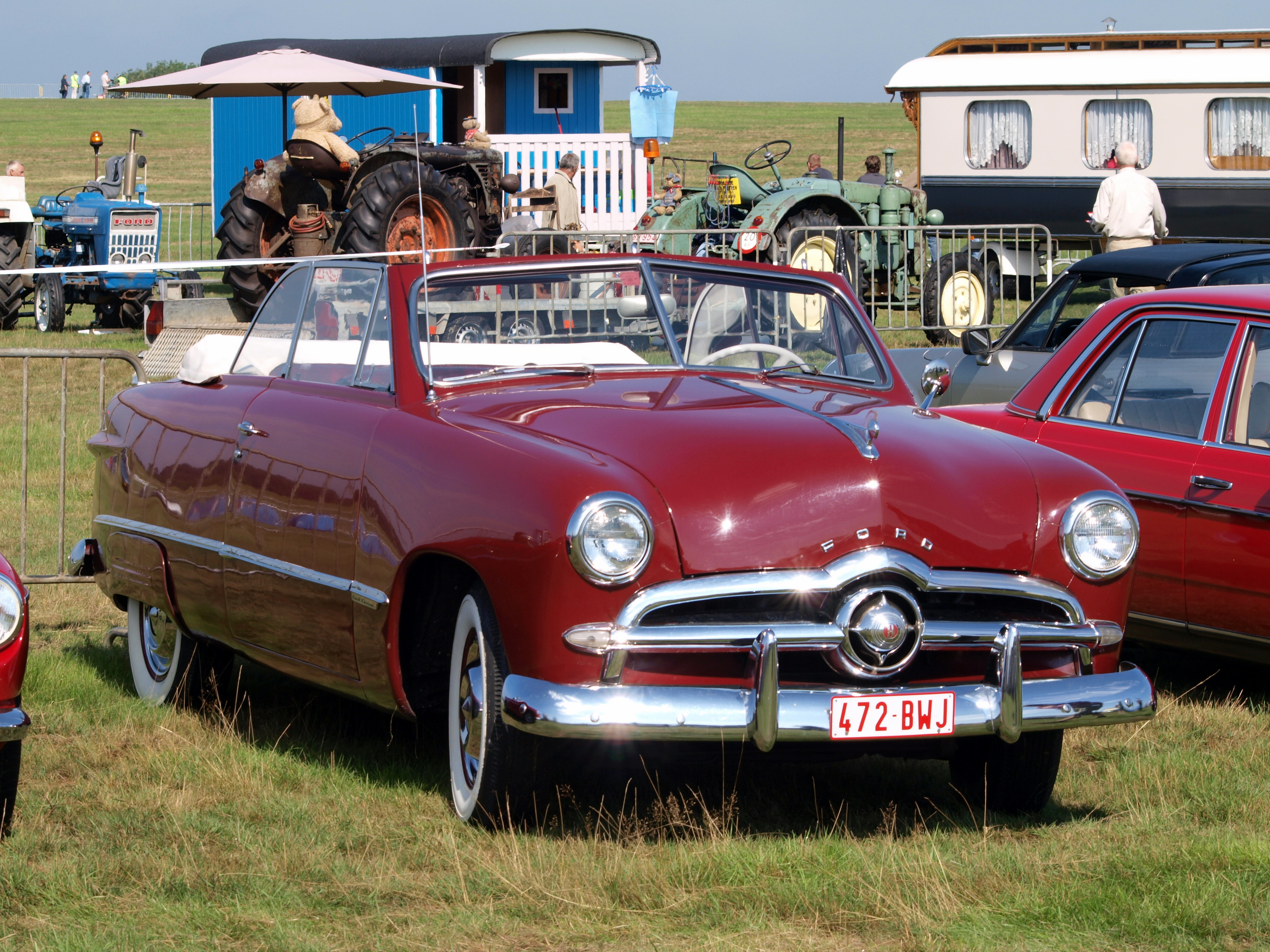
1949 Ford Custom Convertible

=== 1950 ===
For 1950, the Ford saw minor changes, primarily to the exterior. In a badging change, the "FORD" lettering was replaced by an all-new crest badge; in various forms, Ford used a crest emblem on its full-size line for the next four decades. The trim nomenclature underwent revision, as Standard and Custom became Deluxe and Custom Deluxe, respectively. A Deluxe Business Coupe served as the most affordable Ford line. In response to negative consumer feedback, the door latch mechanism underwent multiple safety upgrades.

To compete with the Chevrolet Bel Air hardtop, Ford introduced the Ford Crestliner "sport sedan". The first stand-alone American Ford nameplate, the Crestliner was a premium variant of the Tudor, fitted with two-tone paint and a vinyl roof. The two-door station wagon was renamed the Ford Country Squire; in a functional upgrade, the station wagon received flat-folding rear seats.

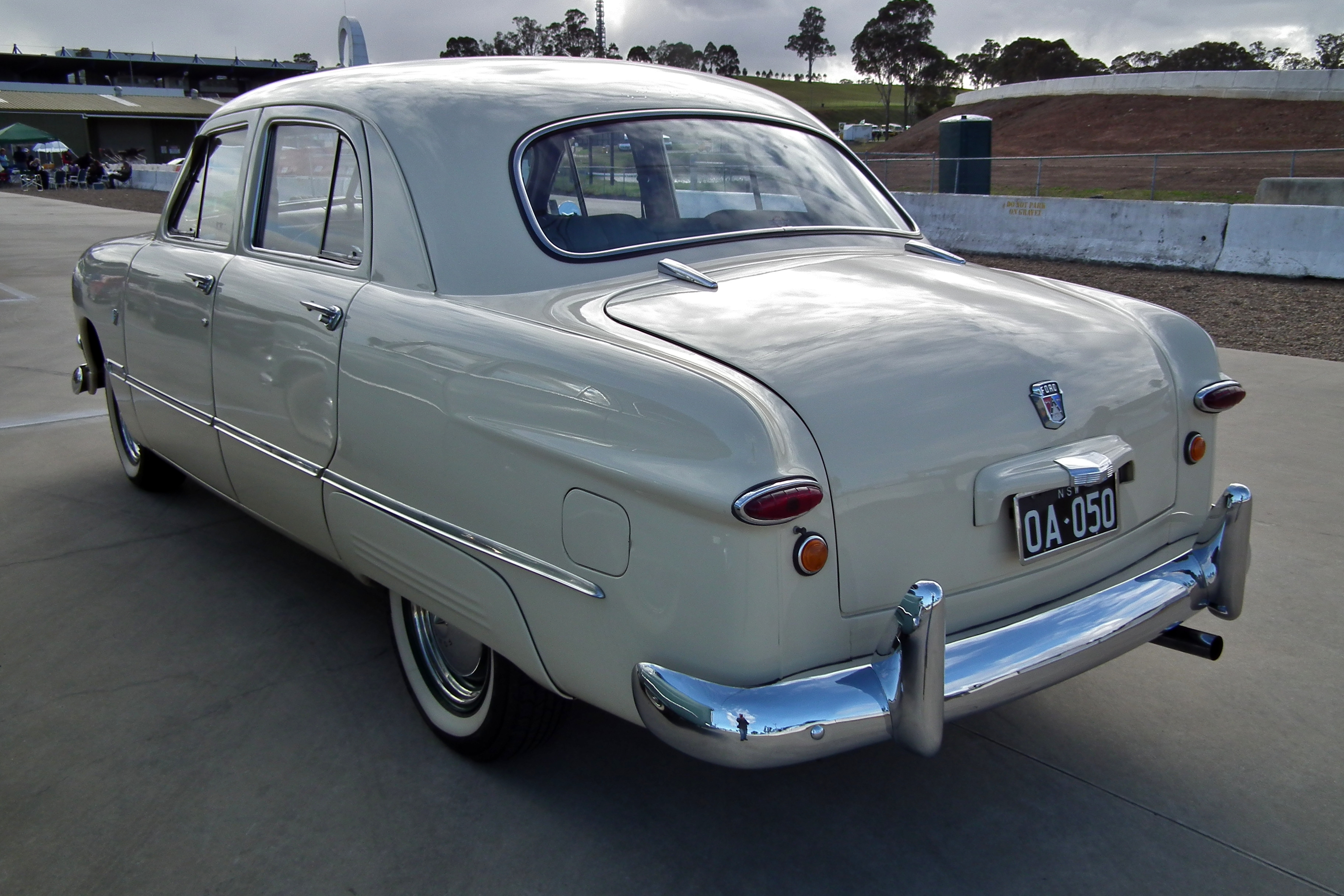
1950 Ford Custom Deluxe Fordor Sedan

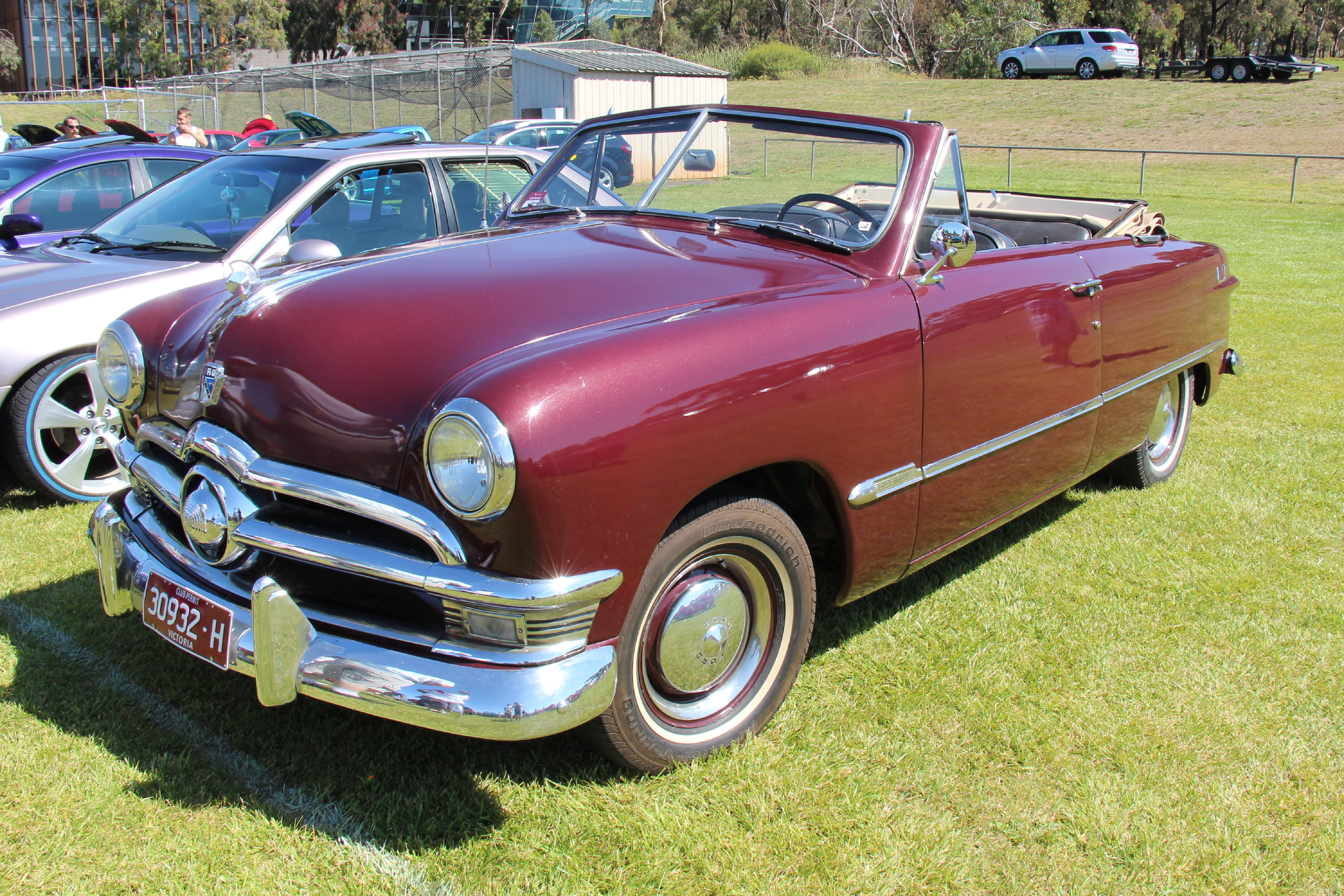
1950 Ford Custom Deluxe Convertible

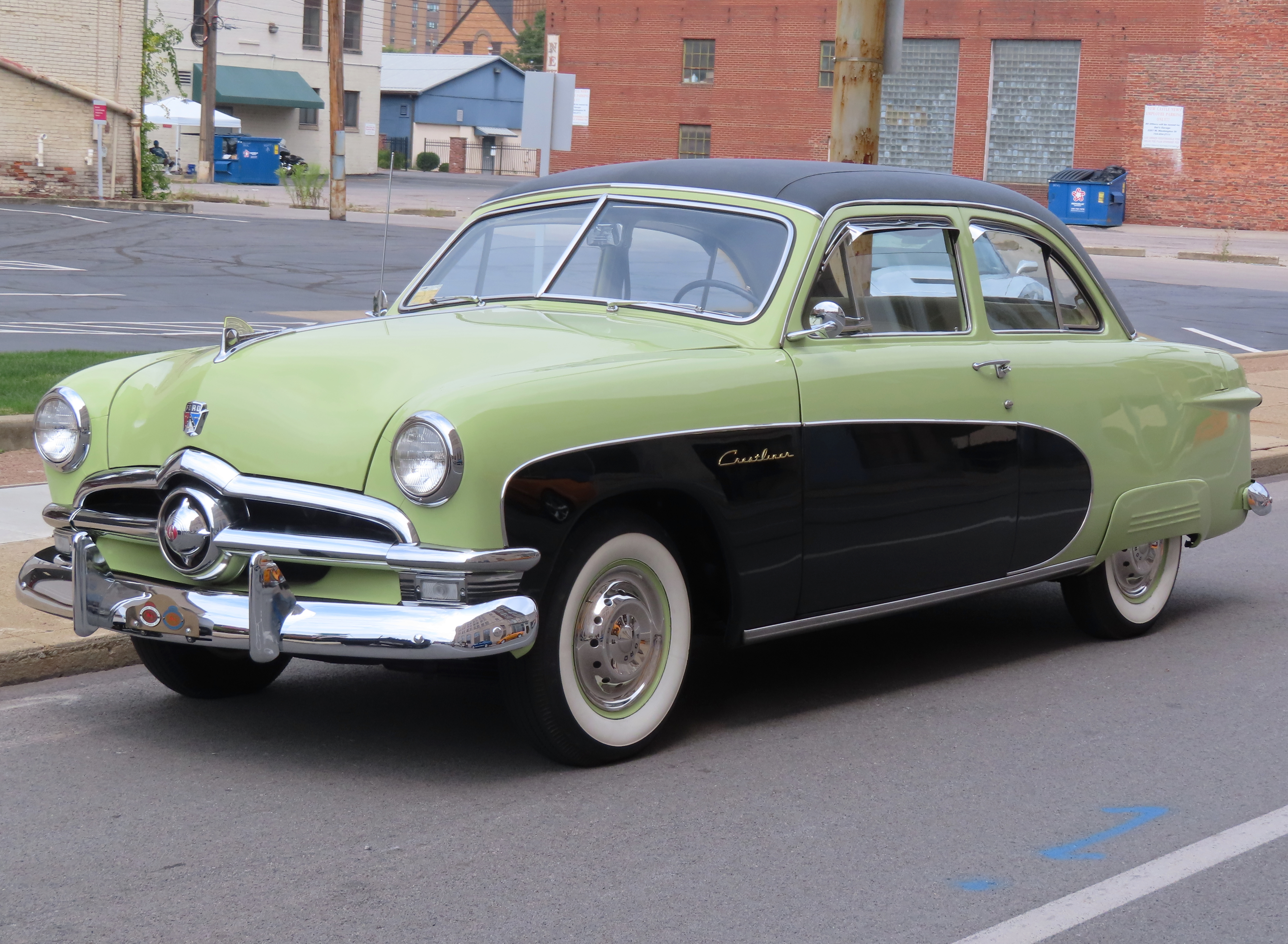
1950 Ford Crestliner

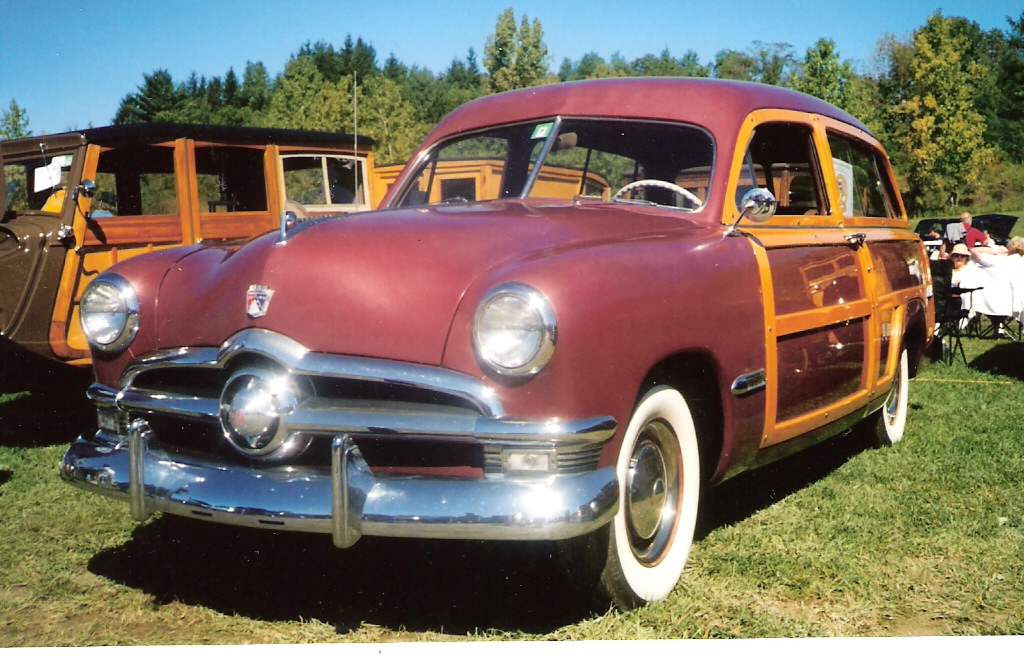
1950 Ford Country Squire

=== 1951 ===
For 1951, the Ford underwent several revisions, distinguished externally by the introduction of a "dual-bullet" grille. The Victoria name (last used for 1934) returned for a two-door hardtop, giving Ford a competitor against the Chevrolet Bel Air and the Plymouth Belvedere; the Tudor-based Crestliner also made a return. Outselling the Bel Air by nearly 10%, the Ford Victoria was a marketplace success.

Alongside the Victoria, Crestliner, and Country Squire, the Ford sedan line underwent minor trim revisions, with Custom Deluxe becoming Custom.

Introduced in November 1950 as an option, the three-speed Ford-O-Matic became the first automatic transmission offered in a Ford vehicle. In a functional upgrade, Ford replaced the starter button with a keyed ignition.

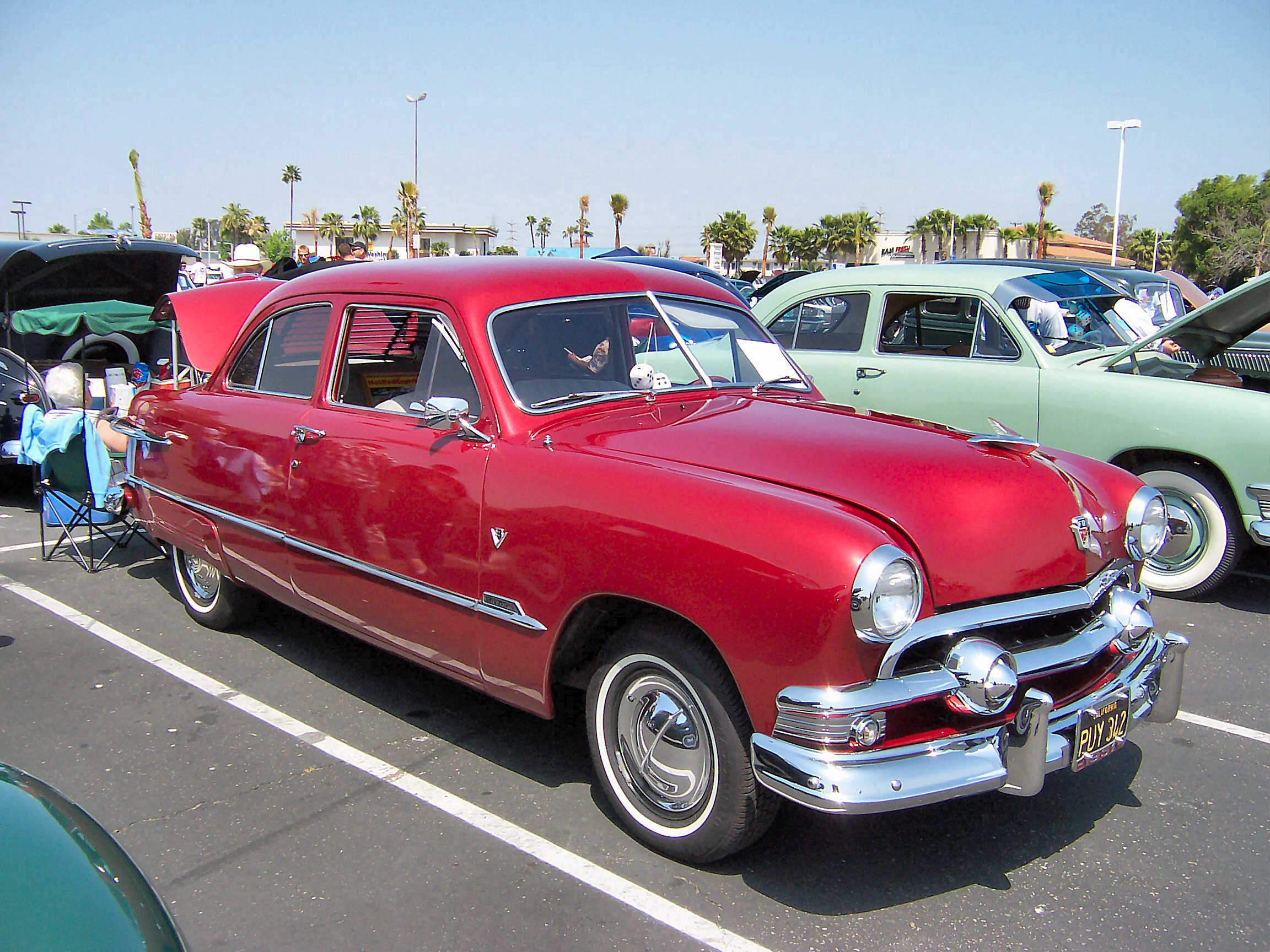
1951 Ford Custom Tudor Sedan

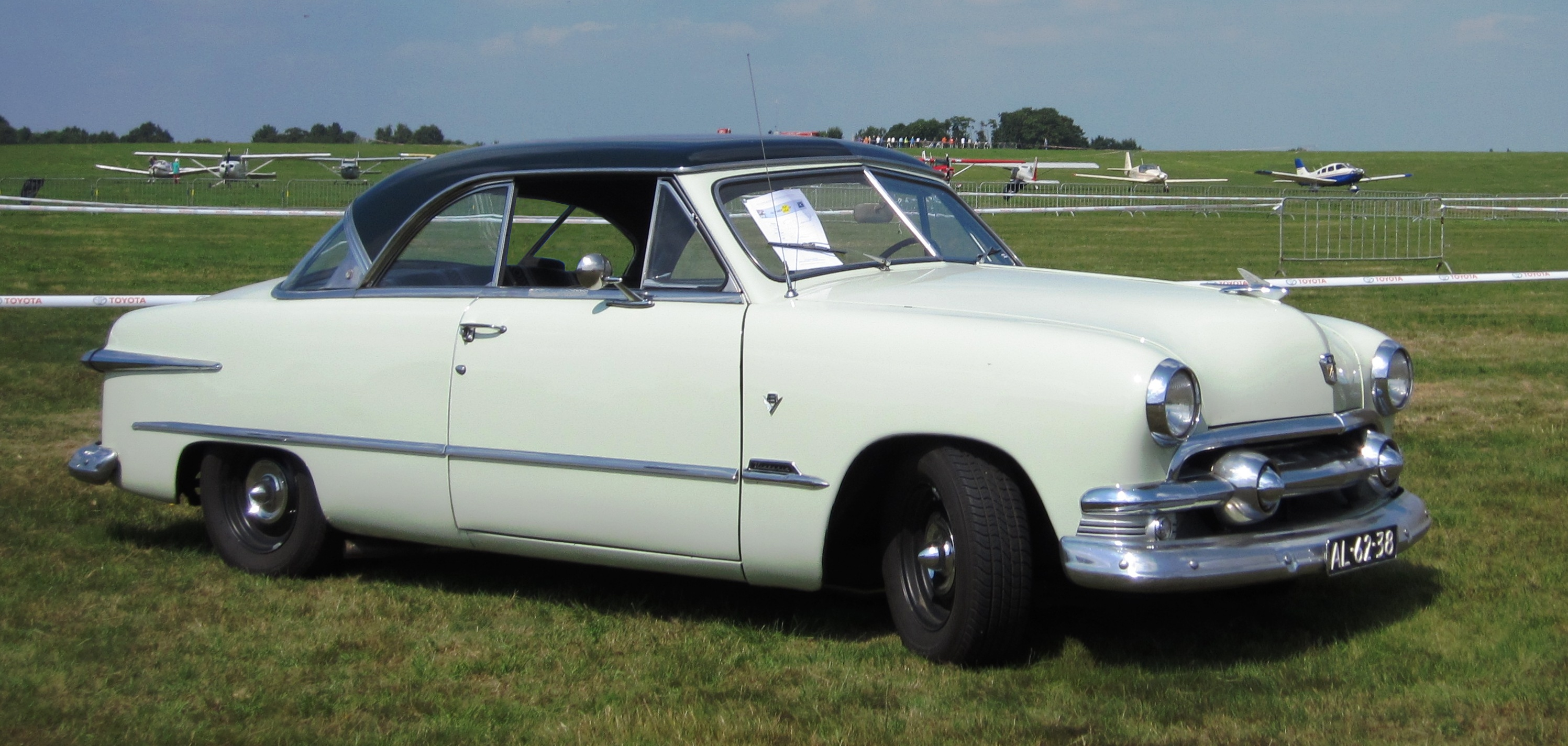
1951 Ford Victoria

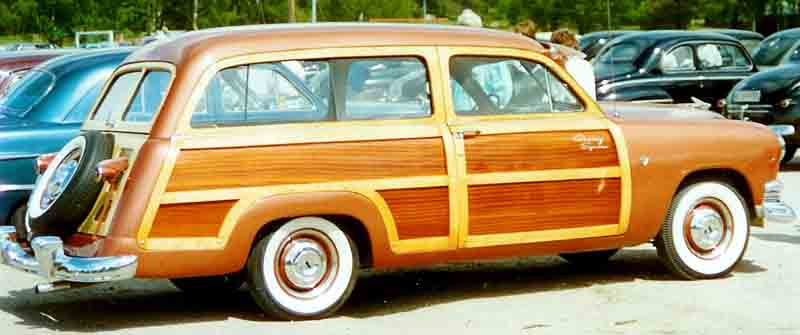
1951 Ford Country Squire

== Meteor (Canada) ==
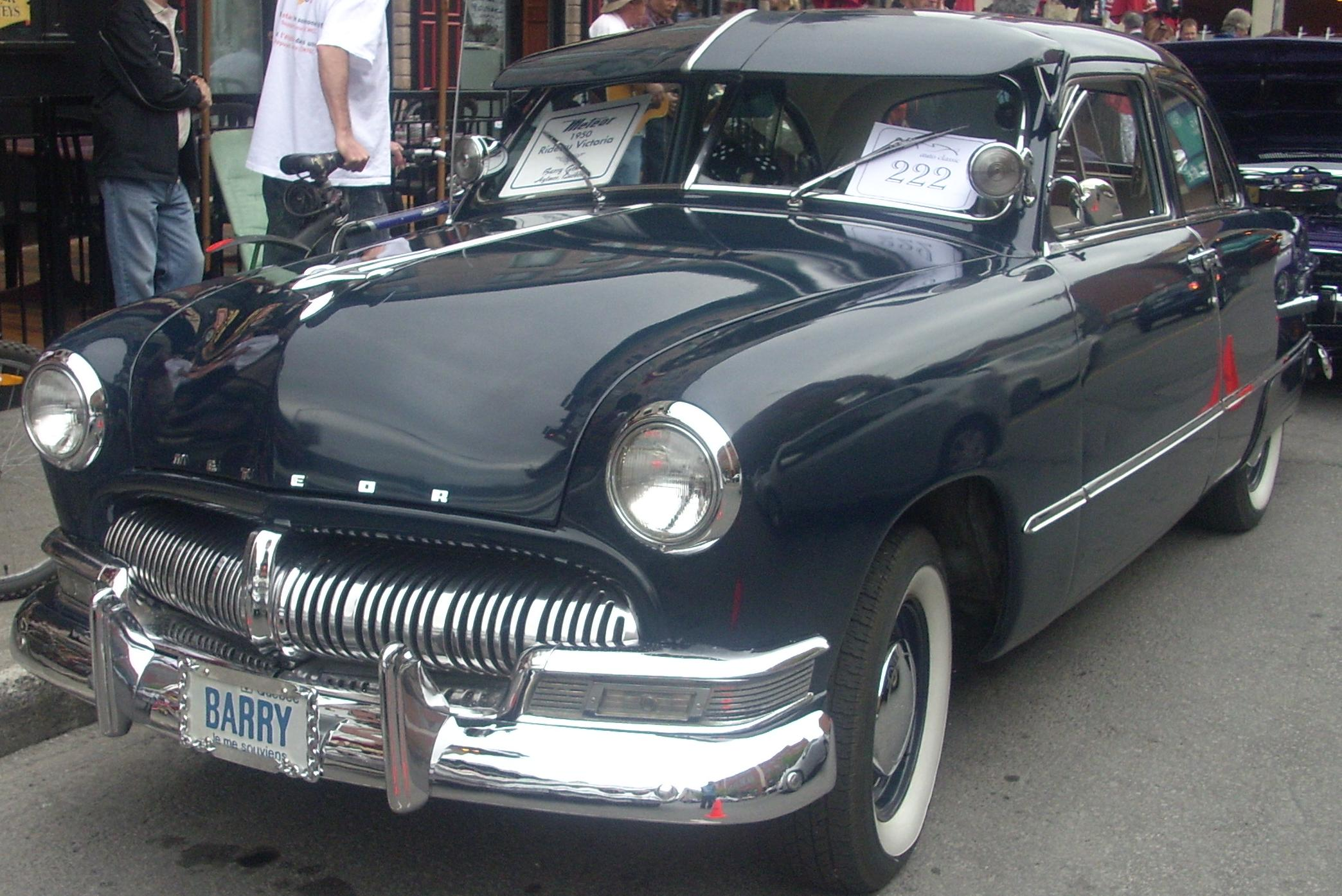
1950 Meteor Victoria

For 1949, Ford of Canada introduced the Meteor brand, intended as an entry-level brand to be marketed within the Lincoln-Mercury dealership network; in smaller communities, the two brands did not share dealership networks. Using a Ford body, chassis, and V8 drivetrain with a Mercury grille (and brand-specific trim), Meteor gave Lincoln-Mercury a lower-price vehicle, effectively giving Ford Canada a brand to compete against Pontiac and Dodge.

For 1949 to 1951, Meteor-brand vehicles shared their model names with Ford vehicles, including a Custom Deluxe Victoria coupe.

== Australian production ==
The 1949 Ford V8 generation was also produced by Ford Australia from 1949 to 1951, serving the Australian market. Alongside a right-hand drive Fordor 4-door sedan, a two-door coupe utility was produced; the latter was developed specifically for sale in Australia.

By 1950, locally produced models of Ford Australia had adopted a level of 80% Australian-sourced content.

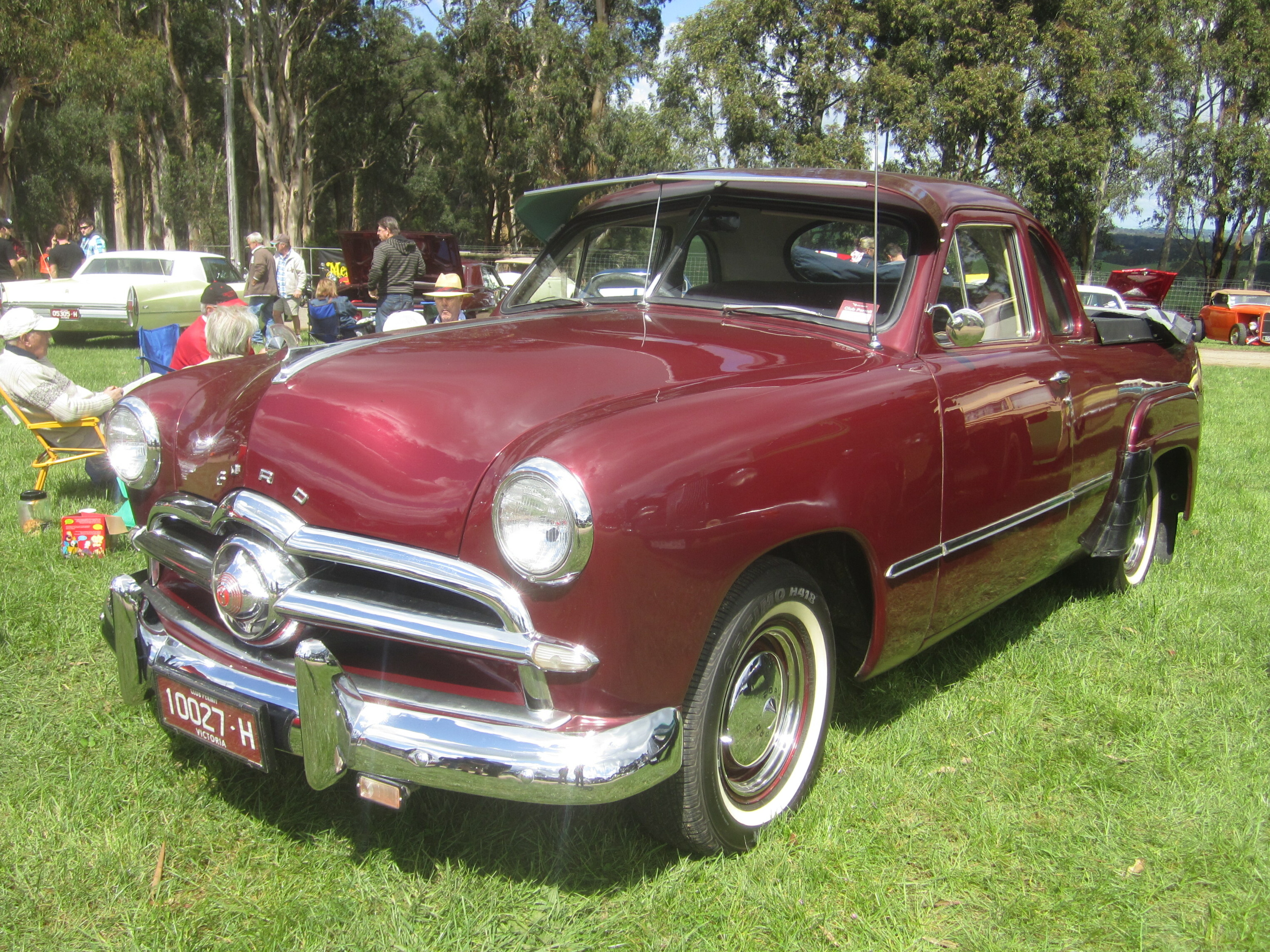
1949 Ford Coupe Utility

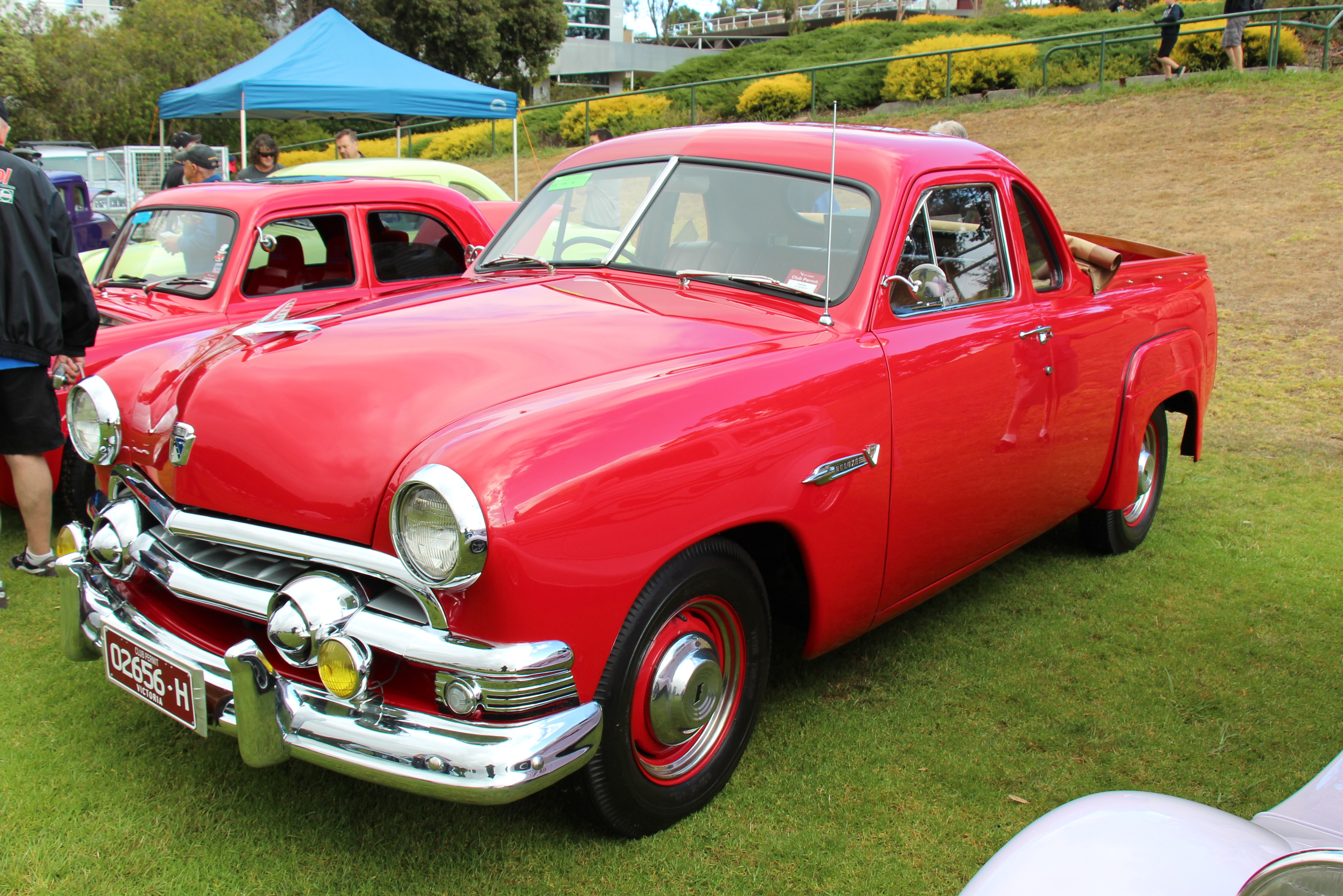
1951 Ford Coupe Utility

== Ford Forty-Nine (2001) ==
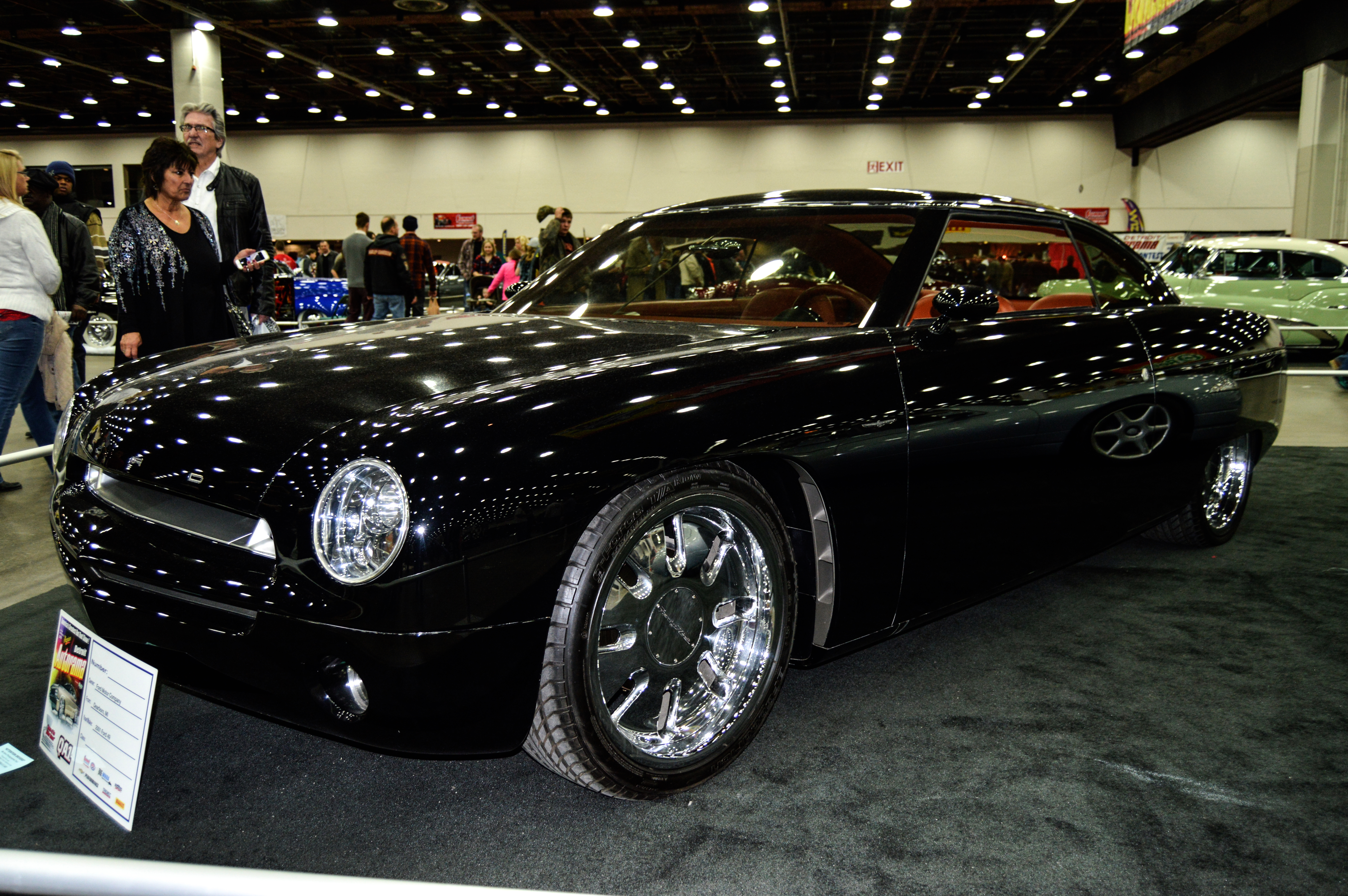
2001 Ford Forty-Nine coupe

For 2001, Ford debuted the Ford Forty-Nine concept car at the 2001 North American International Auto Show. Designed by J Mays and Chip Foose (designer of the Plymouth Prowler), the concept car was intended as a design successor to the revived Ford Thunderbird. Derived on the chassis of the Lincoln LS (and sharing its V8 engine with both the LS and the Thunderbird), the Forty-Nine was developed as a modern interpretation of the 1949 Ford Club Coupe; doing away with the "bullet-nose", the two-door adopted an all-glass roof.

In a fashion similar to the Volkswagen New Beetle, Audi TT, Ford Thunderbird, and Chrysler PT Cruiser, the Ford Forty-Nine was intended as a preview of a possible production vehicle. Alongside the glass-roof coupe, Ford also produced a (non-running) Forty-Nine convertible. After the disappointing launch of the Ford Thunderbird, Ford ended further development on a production version of the Forty-Nine.

== See also ==
- Ford Zephyr Mark I
- Ford Taunus P1
- Standard 10
