= Jaguar AJ-V8 engine =

Jaguar AJ-V8
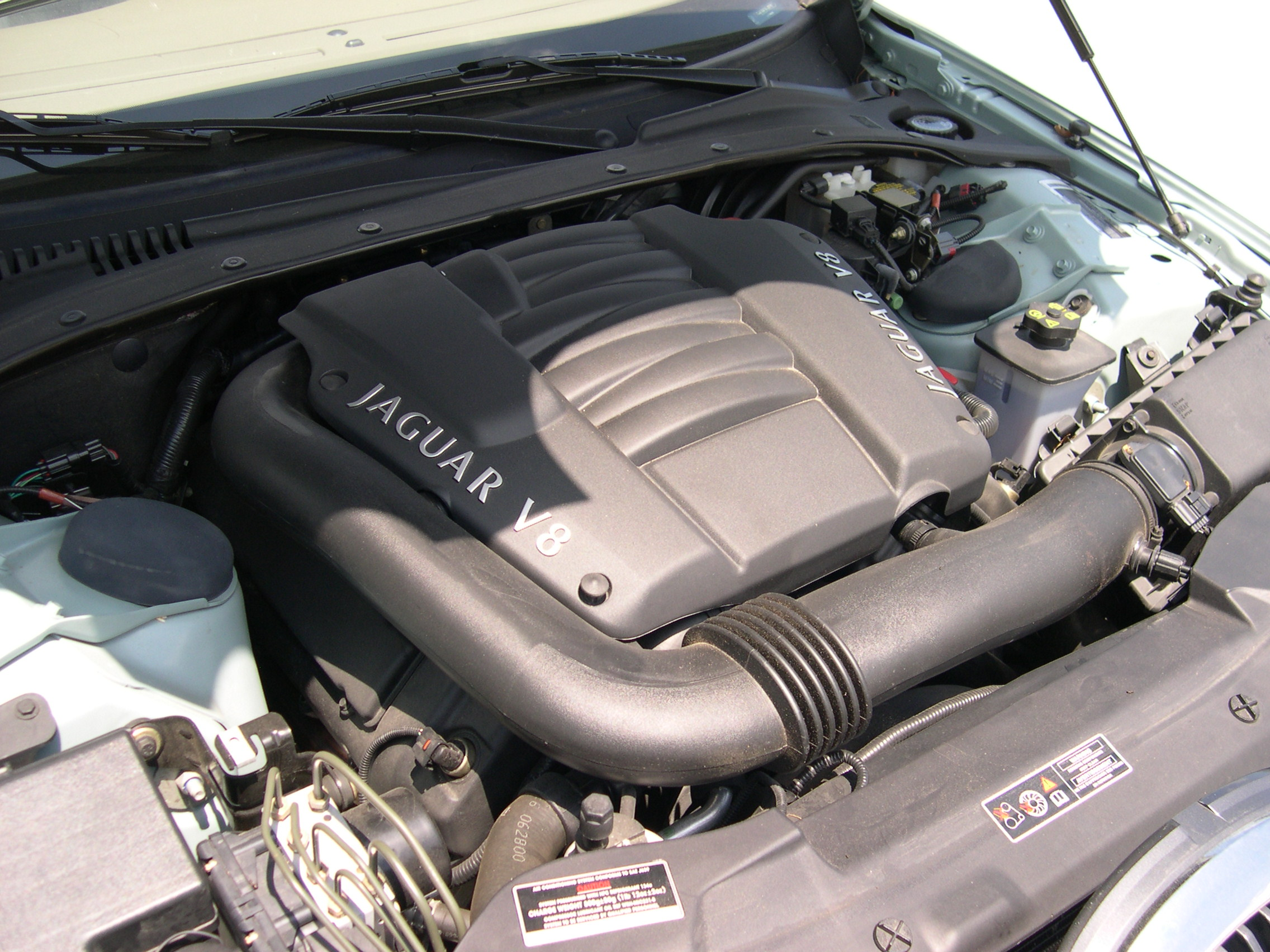

Overview
- Manufacturer: 1996–2012 Jaguar Cars; 2013–2024 Jaguar Land Rover
- Production: 1996–2010; 2005-2017 (AM05/AM14); 2010–2012 (AJ133/AJ133S); 2013–2024 (AJ126/AJ133S)

Layout
- Configuration: 90° V8; 90° V6
- Displacement: 3.0 L (2,995 cc) (V6); 3.5 L (3,473 cc); 3.9 L (3,934 cc); 4.0 L (3,996 cc); 4.2 L (4,196 cc); 4.3 L (4,280 cc); 4.4 L (4,394 cc); 4.7 L (4,735 cc); 5.0 L (5,000 cc)
- Cylinder bore: 84.5 mm (3.33 in) (V6); 86 mm (3.39 in); 88 mm (3.46 in); 89 mm (3.5 in); 91 mm (3.58 in); 92.5 mm (3.64 in)
- Piston stroke: 86 mm (3.39 in); 70 mm (2.76 in); 76.5 mm (3.01 in); 85 mm (3.35 in); 89 mm (3.5 in) (V6); 90.3 mm (3.56 in); 91 mm (3.58 in); 93 mm (3.66 in)
- Cylinder block material: Aluminium alloy
- Cylinder head material: Aluminium alloy
- Valvetrain: DOHC 4 valves x cyl. with VVT
- Compression ratio: 9.5:1; 10.5:1; 11.5:1

Combustion
- Supercharger: Eaton M112 with intercooler (1996-2010); TVS with intercooler (2010-present)
- Fuel system: Multi-port fuel injection (1996-2010); Direct injection (2010-present)
- Management: Denso (1996-2012); Bosch (2013-present)
- Fuel type: Petrol
- Cooling system: Water-cooled

Output
- Power output: 240–592 hp (179–441 kW; 243–600 PS)
- Torque output: 233–516 lb⋅ft (316–700 N⋅m)

Chronology
- Predecessor: Jaguar AJ-V6 (V6); Jaguar AJ16; Jaguar V12; Rover V8; BMW M62
- Successor: Ingenium AJ300; BMW N63 (Range Rover)

The Jaguar AJ-V8 is a compact DOHC V8 piston engine used in many Jaguar vehicles. It was the fourth new engine type in the history of the company. It was an in house design with work beginning before Ford's purchase of the company. In 1997 it replaced both designs previously available on Jaguar cars: the straight-6 Jaguar AJ6 engine (or rather its AJ16 variant), and the Jaguar V12 engine. It remained the only engine type available on Jaguar until 1999 with the launch of the S-Type, when the Jaguar AJ-V6 engine was added to the list. The AJ-V8 is available in displacements ranging from 3.2L to 5.0L, and a supercharged version is also produced. Ford Motor Company also used this engine in other cars, including the Lincoln LS and the 2002–2005 Ford Thunderbird, as well as in several Land Rovers, and the Aston Martin V8 Vantage.

The AJ-V8 was designed to use Nikasil-coated cylinders rather than the more-common iron cylinder liners. However, like the BMW M60, high-sulphur fuel reacted with the Nikasil coating and caused engine failures. Jaguar replaced affected engines, and has used conventional cast-iron linings ever since.

The engine originally used a two-state Variable Valve Timing system to switch the intake cam timing by 30°. Newer variants use a more sophisticated system which can vary intake timing incrementally up to 48°. The Lincoln version was made in the United States.

Other engine features include fracture-split forged powder metal connecting rods, a special one-piece cast camshaft, and reinforced plastic intake manifold.

The AJ-V8 was on the Ward's 10 Best Engines list for 2000.

Ford ceased production of the AJ-V8 engine in September 2020 when it closed the Bridgend Plant. However, in August 2020 JLR was able to take over production means for the AJ-V8.

== Manufacture ==
The AJ8 engine was manufactured in a dedicated Jaguar facility located within the Ford Bridgend Engine Plant in Bridgend, South Wales. The Jaguar "plant-within-a-plant" saved considerable investment costs by Jaguar. It was staffed by workers dedicated to Jaguar engine production and included a linked flow-line of computer numerically controlled machines with automated loading and assembly. Component supply was on a "just-in-time" basis.

Jaguar Land Rover has subsequently produced the AJ supercharged petrol V8 Jaguar Land Rover engines in a state-of-the-art Engine Manufacturing Centre in Wolverhampton.

== 4.0 L ==
The 4.0 L (3,996 cc) AJ26 engine was introduced in 1996. The number "26" comes from 12+6+8 (cylinders), because when the first ideas were sketched, a family of 6-, 8- and 12-cylinder engines was contemplated, although only the 8-cylinder version was produced. It has a square 86 mm (3.39 in) bore and stroke. It was updated in 1998 as the AJ27 with continuously variable valve timing. The AJ-V8 was updated again in 2000 as the AJ28. The naturally aspirated version produces 290 hp (216 kW; 294 PS) in the 2000–2002 XK8.

Vehicles using this engine:

- AJ26
  - 1997–1998 Jaguar XJ8
  - 1997–1998 Jaguar XK8
  - 1997–1998 Daimler V8
- AJ27
  - 1999–2003 Jaguar XJ8
  - 1999–2003 Jaguar XK8
  - 1999–2003 Daimler V8
- AJ28
  - 2000–2002 Jaguar S-Type 281 hp (210 kW; 285 PS), 287 lb⋅ft (389 N⋅m)

=== Supercharged ===
The supercharged version of the AJ26 is used in the high-performance R versions of Jaguar's cars. The engine was updated with AJ27 specifications for 2000. It produces 370 hp (276 kW; 375 PS) and 387 lb⋅ft (525 N⋅m) with the help of an Eaton supercharger (modified Roots-blower). The supercharged engine did not use variable cam timing as the normal benefits of improved volumetric efficiency are not noticeable on a boosted engine.

Vehicles using the supercharged version include:

- AJ26S
  - 1998–1999 Jaguar XJR
  - 1998–1999 Jaguar XKR
  - 1998–1999 Daimler Super V8
- AJ27S
  - 2000–2003 Jaguar XJR
  - 2000–2003 Jaguar XKR
  - 2000–2003 Daimler Super V8

== 3.2 L ==
The 3.2 litre variant was the second to be introduced. It reduces the stroke to 70 mm (2.76 in) and power falls to 240 hp (179 kW; 243 PS) and 233 lb⋅ft (316 N⋅m). This variant was not available in the North American market. This engine did not use variable cam timing.

Vehicles using this engine:

- 1997–2003 Jaguar XJ8

== 3.5 L ==
The 3.6 L (3,555 cc; 216.9 cu in) engine, marketed as a "3.5", was only used in the XJ series. The stroke was 76.5 mm (3.01 in). Output was 262 bhp (195 kW; 266 PS) at 6,250 rpm and 345 N⋅m (254 lb⋅ft) at 4,200 rpm.

Vehicles using this engine:

- 2002–2007 Jaguar XJ8 3.5, 262 hp (195 kW; 266 PS) and 254 lb⋅ft (344 N⋅m)

== 3.9 L ==
The 3.9 L (3,934 cc) AJ30/AJ35 variant is a unique displacement used only by Ford and Lincoln and is built in Ford's Lima, OH engine plant. Bore and stroke is 86 mm × 85 mm (3.39 in × 3.35 in). The AJ35 version introduced for the 2003 model year added variable valve timing of the intake camshafts and electronic throttle control. While the block, crankshaft, pistons, and connecting rods are all unique to this displacement, many other parts are shared with the AJ-V8 engines produced in the UK by Jaguar.

Vehicles using this engine:

- 2000–2002 Lincoln LS, 252 hp (188 kW; 255 PS) 267 lb⋅ft (362 N⋅m)
- 2002 Ford Thunderbird, 252 hp (188 kW; 255 PS) 267 lb⋅ft (362 N⋅m)
- 2003–2006 Lincoln LS, 280 hp (209 kW; 284 PS) 286 lb⋅ft (388 N⋅m)
- 2003–2005 Ford Thunderbird, 280 hp (209 kW; 284 PS) 286 lb⋅ft (388 N⋅m)
- Ford Forty-Nine concept

The last AJ35 was produced in March 2006 after only 3 years. Total run of AJ30/35 was nearly 250,000 units

== 4.2 L ==
The 4.2 L (4,196 cc; 256.1 cu in), AJ33 and AJ34 versions retain the 86 mm (3.39 in) bore with 90.3 mm (3.56 in) stroke. It was introduced in 2002 as the AJ33 and produces 294 hp (219 kW; 298 PS) at 6,000 rpm with 303 lb⋅ft (411 N⋅m) of torque at 4,100 rpm, later increased to 300 hp (224 kW; 304 PS) and 310 lb⋅ft (420 N⋅m).

Vehicles using this engine:

- 2003–2006 Jaguar XK-series 294 hp (219 kW; 298 PS), 303 lb⋅ft (411 N⋅m)
- 2006–2008 Jaguar XK-series 300 hp (224 kW; 304 PS), 310 lb⋅ft (420 N⋅m)
- 2002–2008 Jaguar S-Type 4.2, 300 hp (224 kW; 304 PS) and 310 lb⋅ft (420 N⋅m)
- 2004–2009 Jaguar XJ8, 300 hp (224 kW; 304 PS) and 310 lb⋅ft (420 N⋅m)
- 2008–2010 Jaguar XF, 300 hp (224 kW; 304 PS) and 310 lb⋅ft (420 N⋅m)

=== Supercharged ===
The AJ33S is a supercharged/intercooled variant of the AJ33. It was introduced in 2002 to replace the 4.0 SC and produces 390 hp (291 kW; 395 PS) at 6,100 rpm with 399 lb⋅ft (541 N⋅m) of torque at 3,500 rpm. The engine was later updated to AJ34S specification to include Variable Valve Timing as well as other minor updates.

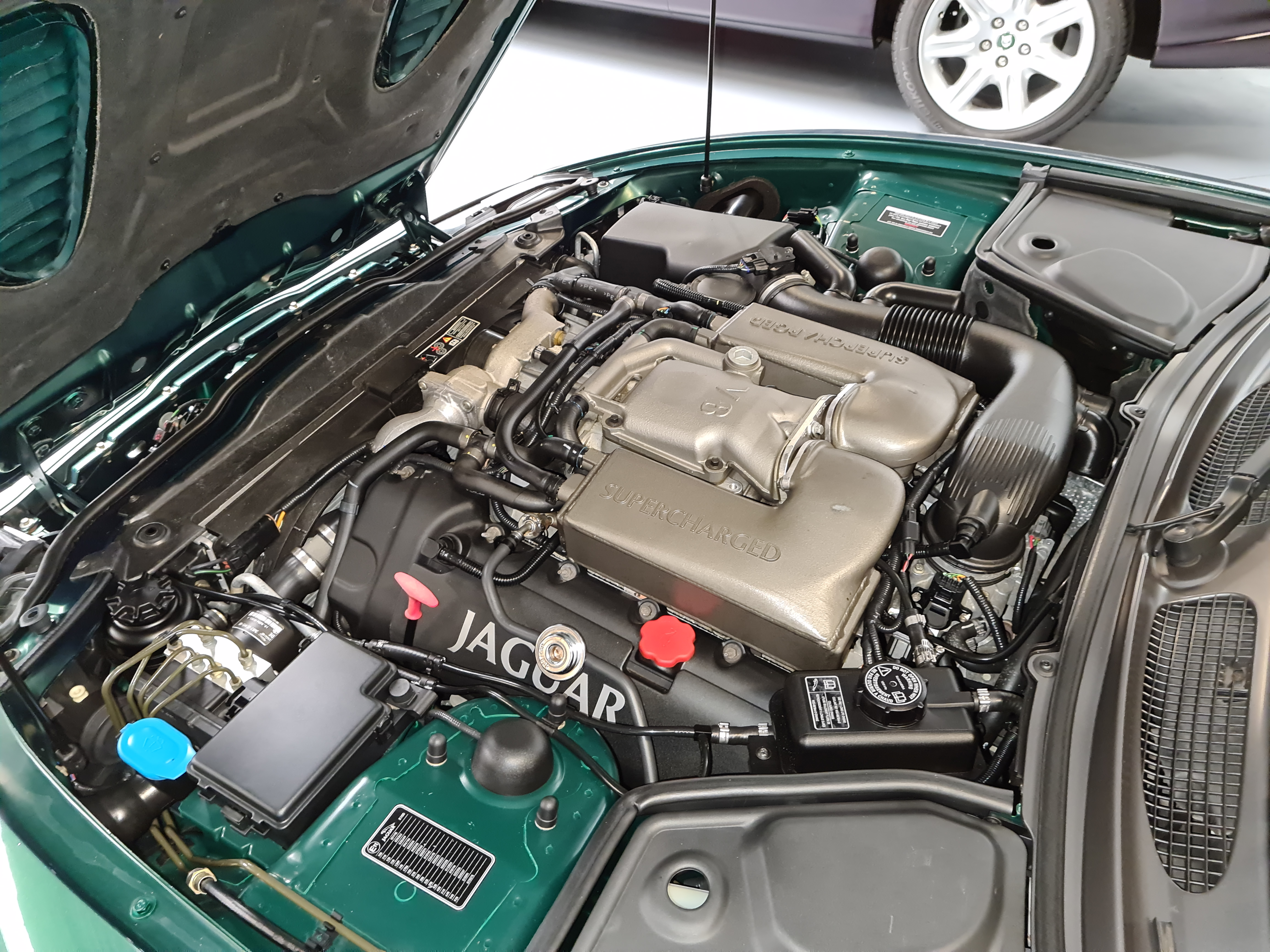
4.2-litre Supercharged V8 in a 2003 Jaguar XKR

Vehicles using this engine:

- 2004–2009 Jaguar XJR/Super V8, 400 hp (298 kW; 406 PS) and 408 lb⋅ft (553 N⋅m)
- 2003–2006 Jaguar XKR, 400 hp (298 kW; 406 PS) and 408 lb⋅ft (553 N⋅m)
- 2006–2008 Jaguar XKR, 420 hp (313 kW; 426 PS) and 410 lb⋅ft (556 N⋅m)
- 2003–2008 Jaguar S-Type R, 400 hp (298 kW; 406 PS) and 408 lb⋅ft (553 N⋅m)
- 2005–2009 Daimler Super Eight
- 2008–2010 Jaguar XF, 420 hp (313 kW; 426 PS) and 408 lb⋅ft (553 N⋅m)

Land Rover also offered a supercharged version of the 4.2 L as that company's high-performance engine. Land Rover's version is not the same as the Jaguar's version but it was adapted from it.

Applications:

- 2006–2009 Land Rover Range Rover Sport 390 hp (291 kW; 395 PS) and 406 lb⋅ft (550 N⋅m)
- 2006–2009 Land Rover Range Rover 400 hp (298 kW; 406 PS) and 413 lb⋅ft (560 N⋅m)

== 4.4 L ==
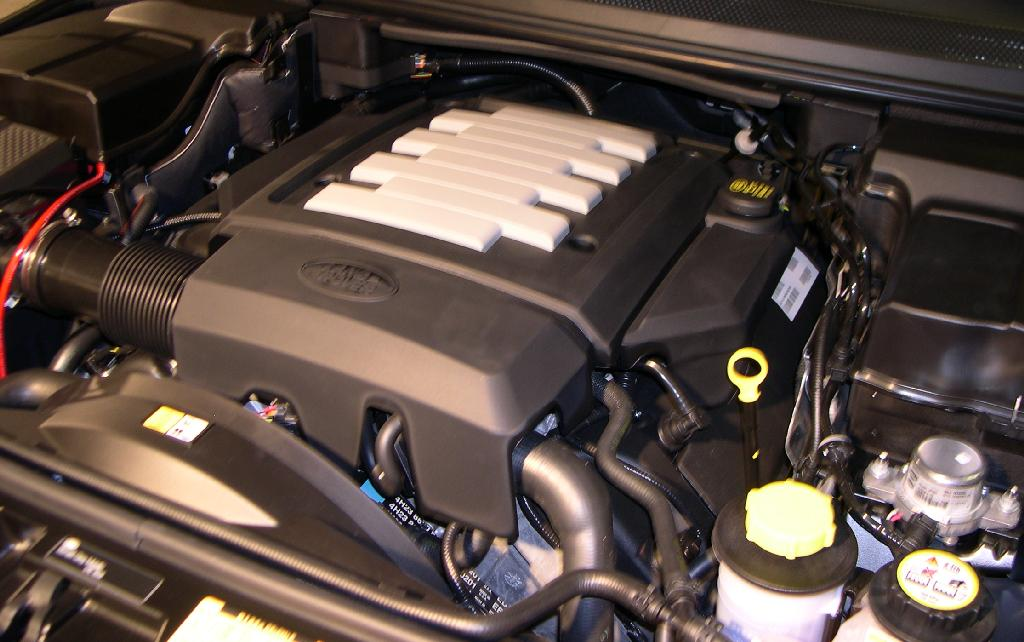
4.4-litre V8 in a 2006 Range Rover Sport

The 4.4 L (4,394 cc; 268.1 cu in) AJ41 version features an 88 mm × 90.3 mm (3.46 in × 3.56 in) bore and stroke. This engine replaced the BMW M62 engine used in 2003-2005 Range Rover models.

Applications:

- 2005–2009 Land Rover Discovery 3 / LR3 - 300 hp (224 kW; 304 PS), 315 lb⋅ft (427 N⋅m)
- 2006–2009 Land Rover Range Rover Sport - 300 hp (224 kW; 304 PS) at 5,500 rpm, 315 lb⋅ft (427 N⋅m) at 4,000 rpm
- 2006–2009 Land Rover Range Rover - 305 hp (227 kW; 309 PS) at 5,750 rpm, 325 lb⋅ft (441 N⋅m) at 4,000 rpm

== Aston Martin 4.3/4.7 ==
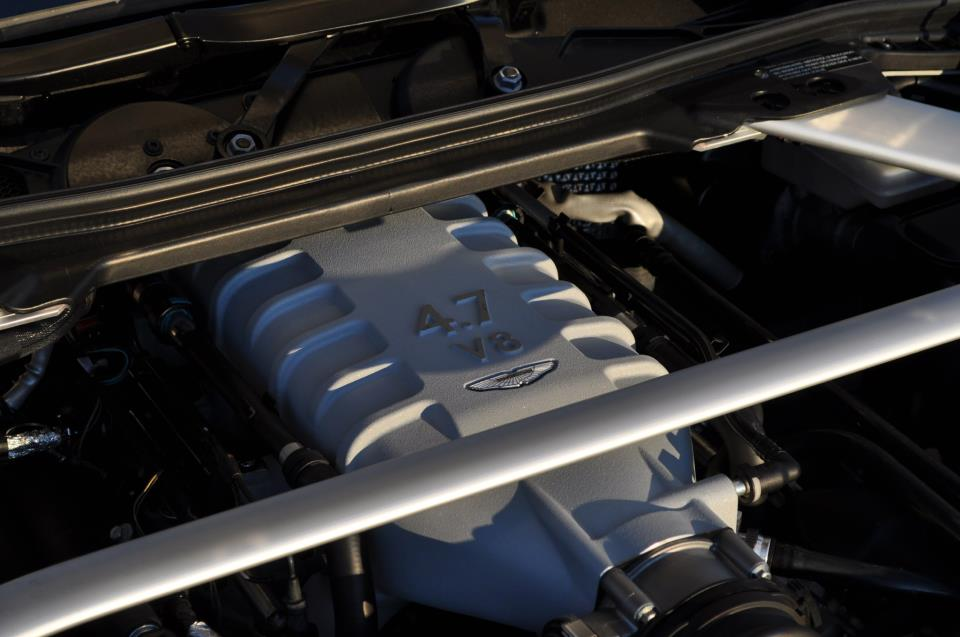
4.7L V8 in a 2012 Vantage

Aston Martin hand-assembles a special version of the AJ-V8 for the 2005 V8 Vantage known as AM05 – or while it was under development as AJ37. This unit displaced 4.3 L (4,280 cc; 261.2 cu in) and produces 380 bhp (283 kW; 385 PS) at 7,000 rpm and 409 N⋅m (302 lb⋅ft) at 5,000 rpm. This engine is unique to Aston Martin and features race-style dry-sump lubrication, which enables it to be mounted low to lower the centre of gravity. The firing order is the same as the other AJ-V8 engines although the cylinder numbering is different (AJ37 = 1-5-4-2-6-3-7-8 vs. AJ26 = 1-2-7-3-4-5-6-8). The engine is assembled by hand at the AM facility in Cologne, Germany, which also builds the V12 for the DB9 and Vanquish. The cylinder block, cylinder heads, crankshaft, connecting rods, pistons, camshafts, inlet and exhaust manifolds, lubrication system and engine management are all unique to the Aston Martin version.

In May 2008, Aston Martin released a new design that used pressed cylinder liners instead of cast-in liners. This allowed for thinner liners, and a higher capacity of 4.7 L (4,735 cc; 288.9 cu in) for the V8 Vantage. Called the AM14, power output increased to 420 bhp (313 kW; 426 PS) (an 11% increase on the previous 4.3-litre unit) and peak torque to 470 N⋅m (347 lb⋅ft) (a 15% increase). The Aston Martin V8 Vantage S features the same 4.7-litre V8 engine found in the base Vantage, but with improved intake airflow, new mufflers, and new programming that keeps the exhaust system's bypass valves open longer. The engine in the V8 Vantage S now develops 430 bhp (321 kW; 436 PS) at 7,300 rpm and torque of 490 N⋅m (361 lb⋅ft) at 5,000 rpm representing an increase of 10 bhp (7 kW; 10 PS) and 20 N⋅m (15 lb⋅ft) respectively. This engine is also used in the bespoke Aston Martin DB10 concept car for the 2015 James Bond film Spectre.

4.3, bore and stroke 89 mm × 86 mm (3.50 in × 3.39 in)

4.7, bore and stroke 91 mm × 91 mm (3.58 in × 3.58 in)

Applications:

- 2005–2017 Aston Martin V8 Vantage
- 2014–2015 Aston Martin DB10 (concept car)
- 2018 Aston Martin V8 Cygnet (one-off)

== AJ-V8 Gen III ==
An all new direct injection 5.0 L engine family was introduced in 2009, for the 2010 model year. The AJ133 is a 90° V8 engine available in either supercharged or naturally aspirated form, with a bore & stroke of 92.5 mm × 93 mm (3.64 in × 3.66 in) and a compression ratio of 9.5:1 for the supercharged version and 11.5:1 for the naturally aspirated one respectively.

The main structural components of the engine are all manufactured from aluminium alloy. The engine is built around a very stiff, lightweight, enclosed V, deep skirt cylinder block, with an open-deck design. A structural windage tray is bolted to the bottom of the cylinder block to further improve the block stiffness, minimize NVH (noise, vibration and harshness) and help reduce oil foaming. To further enhance the stiffness of the lower engine structure, a heavily ribbed sump body is installed. The sump body also helps to reduce engine noise.

A spheroidal graphite cast-iron crankshaft is utilized with high-strength cast pistons and fracture-split forged steel connecting rods manufactured from 36 Mn VS4 steel.

The engine uses a Bosch high pressure direct injection fuel system with fuel pressure provided by two, cam driven high pressure pumps which are driven by a dedicated camshaft. The high pressure pumps supply the fuel rails which in turn supply the four injectors for that bank with fuel at a controlled pressure.

The four camshafts incorporate VCT (variable camshaft timing). VCT allows the timing of the intake and exhaust valves to be adjusted independently of each other.

The naturally aspirated engine features cam profile switching and variable tract length inlet manifold.

Supercharged engines make use of a sixth-generation 1.9L TVS (Twin Vortices Series) supercharger, which is located in the valley of the engine and is driven from the crankshaft by a dedicated secondary drive belt.

Denso's Generation 1.6 Engine Management System was used on earlier models, later switching to Bosch's MED17 engine management MY 2013+ (except for the XKR and XKR-S).

The direct fuel injection system, advanced piston and combustion chamber design and the supercharger provide improved fuel consumption and emissions, as these engines meet EU5 emission regulations in Europe and Rest of World (ROW) and ULEV 70 emission regulations in North American Specification (NAS) markets.

The naturally aspirated engine was replaced by the AJ126 supercharged V6 engine starting for MY 2013. It has since been replaced by the all-new Ingenium turbocharged inline-6 engine.

Jaguar has discontinued most of its internal combustion engine (ICE) models, including those featuring the AJ133S, as part of its transition to an all-electric lineup by 2027. The 2026 Jaguar F-PACE SVR was the final Jaguar model to feature the AJ133S supercharged V8. The AJ133S began its phase-out in the Defender lineup with the introduction of the 2025 model year, when the Defender OCTA debuted as a higher-performance offering alongside the existing 5.0L V8 models, featuring BMW's N63 twin-turbocharged V8. The 5.0L AJ133S remained available in the standard V8 trim through the 2026 model year, marking its final year of production in the Defender. The N63 had already been introduced in the Range Rover lineup with the 2022 Range Rover and 2023 Range Rover Sport, both carrying the NC11 engine designation.

=== 5.0L Naturally Aspirated ===
Naturally aspirated variant is known as the AJ133. Land Rover version is called 'LR-V8 Petrol engine'.

Vehicles using this engine:

Years	Model	Power output	Torque
2010–2015	Jaguar XF	385 PS (283 kW; 380 hp)	515 N⋅m (380 lb⋅ft)
2010–2015	Jaguar XJ	385 PS (283 kW; 380 hp)	515 N⋅m (380 lb⋅ft)
2009–2014	Jaguar XK	385 PS (283 kW; 380 hp)	515 N⋅m (380 lb⋅ft)
2009–2015	Land Rover Discovery 4 / LR4	375 PS (276 kW; 370 hp)	375 lb⋅ft (508 N⋅m)
2010–2015	Land Rover Range Rover Sport	375 PS (276 kW; 370 hp)	375 lb⋅ft (508 N⋅m)
2010–2014	Land Rover Range Rover	375 PS (276 kW; 370 hp)	375 lb⋅ft (508 N⋅m)
2018-2020	Land Rover Defender Works V8	405 PS (298 kW; 399 hp)	380 lb⋅ft (515 N⋅m)

=== 5.0L Supercharged ===
The AJ133S is the supercharged variant of the AJ133, featuring an Eaton TVS1900R supercharger. It incorporates twin water-to-air intercoolers and a front-mount heat exchanger, with a shared cooling circuit. Differences over the naturally aspirated engine include; flat-top pistons for a lower compression ratio (9.5:1 vs 11.5:1), piston-oil spray jets, and different intake camshafts without cam-profile switching capabilities.

All AJ133S engines utilize the same supercharger pulley setup, capable of producing approximately 15PSI of boost. Differences in ECU calibrations determine the final power output.

Vehicles using this engine:

Years	Model	Power output	Torque
2010–2015	Jaguar XF Supercharged	470 PS (346 kW; 464 hp)	575 N⋅m (424 lb⋅ft)
2010–2015	Jaguar XFR	510 PS (375 kW; 503 hp)	625 N⋅m (461 lb⋅ft)
2013–2015	Jaguar XFR-S	550 PS (405 kW; 542 hp)	680 N⋅m (502 lb⋅ft)
2010–2019	Jaguar XJ Supercharged	470 PS (346 kW; 464 hp)	575 N⋅m (424 lb⋅ft)
2010–2013	Jaguar XJ Supersport	510 PS (375 kW; 503 hp)	625 N⋅m (461 lb⋅ft)
2014–2017	Jaguar XJR	550 PS (405 kW; 542 hp)	680 N⋅m (502 lb⋅ft)
2018–2019	Jaguar XJR575	575 PS (423 kW; 567 hp)	700 N⋅m (516 lb⋅ft)
2009–2015	Jaguar XKR	510 PS (375 kW; 503 hp)	625 N⋅m (461 lb⋅ft)
2011–2015	Jaguar XKR-S	550 PS (405 kW; 542 hp)	680 N⋅m (502 lb⋅ft)
2013–2014	Jaguar XKR-S GT	550 PS (405 kW; 542 hp)	680 N⋅m (502 lb⋅ft)
2013–2015	Jaguar F-Type V8 S	495 PS (364 kW; 488 hp)	625 N⋅m (461 lb⋅ft)
2014–2020	Jaguar F-Type R	550 PS (405 kW; 542 hp)	680 N⋅m (502 lb⋅ft)
2015–2020	Jaguar F-Type SVR	575 PS (423 kW; 567 hp)	680 N⋅m (502 lb⋅ft)
2015–2016	Jaguar F-Type Project 7	575 PS (423 kW; 567 hp)	680 N⋅m (502 lb⋅ft)
2020–2024	Jaguar F-Type P450	450 PS (331 kW; 444 hp)	580 N⋅m (428 lb⋅ft)
2020–2024	Jaguar F-Type R	575 PS (423 kW; 567 hp)	680 N⋅m (502 lb⋅ft)
2018–2019	Jaguar XE SV Project 8	600 PS (441 kW; 592 hp)	700 N⋅m (516 lb⋅ft)
2018–2024	Jaguar F-Pace SVR	550 PS (405 kW; 542 hp)	700 N⋅m (516 lb⋅ft)
2025–2026	Jaguar F-Pace SVR 575 Edition	575 PS (423 kW; 567 hp)	700 N⋅m (516 lb⋅ft)
2010–2022	Land Rover Range Rover Sport Supercharged	510 PS (375 kW; 503 hp)	461 lb⋅ft (625 N⋅m)
2015–2022	Land Rover Range Rover Sport SVR	550 PS (405 kW; 542 hp)	502 lb⋅ft (681 N⋅m)
2010–2021	Land Rover Range Rover Supercharged	510 PS (375 kW; 503 hp)	461 lb⋅ft (625 N⋅m)
2019–2020	Land Rover Range Rover Velar SVAutobiography	550 PS (405 kW; 542 hp)	502 lb⋅ft (681 N⋅m)
2021–2024	Land Rover Defender V8 P525	525 PS (386 kW; 518 hp)	461 lb⋅ft (625 N⋅m)
2021–2024	Land Rover Defender V8 P425	425 PS (313 kW; 419 hp)	406 lb⋅ft (550 N⋅m)

The Bowler Nemesis and David Brown Speedback Silverstone Edition also use a variant of this engine producing 600 PS (441 kW; 592 hp).

=== 3.0L Supercharged ===
The AJ126 is a V6 engine that uses an AJ133 V8 engine block with the rear two cylinder bores blanked, and reduced bore sizes on the remaining six cylinders. While the engine block is the same size as the V8, the cylinder heads are shortened versions of the V8 heads. It is made on the same production line as the AJ133.

The AJ126 is a 3.0 L (2,995 cc; 182.8 cu in) 90° petrol V6, having a bore and stroke of 84.5 mm × 89 mm (3.33 in × 3.50 in) with a 10.5:1 compression ratio. It is supercharged and liquid cooled featuring direct fuel injection, four overhead camshafts and four valves per cylinder. There are two versions differing in power produced, a standard version making 340 PS (250 kW; 335 hp) at 6,500 rpm and 332 lb⋅ft (450 N⋅m) between 3,500-5,000 rpm and a high-performance variant making 380 PS (279 kW; 375 hp) at 6,500 rpm and 339 lb⋅ft (460 N⋅m) between 3,500-5,000 rpm. A special Jaguar F-Type 400 Sport model made 400 PS (294 kW; 395 hp) and 339 lb⋅ft (460 N⋅m).

The AJ126 engine features an Eaton TVS Roots-type supercharger. Specifically a 1.3L Eaton TVS R1320, mounted in the engine’s valley and is known for its compact design, efficiency, and ability to deliver smooth, immediate power.

Jaguar has since replaced the AJ-126 with an all new Ingenium turbocharged inline-6 engine.

Vehicles using this engine:

Years	Model	Power output	Torque
2013–2024	Jaguar F-Type V6 / V6 S / R-Dynamic	380 PS (279 kW; 375 hp)	339 lb⋅ft (460 N⋅m)
2018	Jaguar F-Type 400 Sport	400 PS (294 kW; 395 hp)	339 lb⋅ft (460 N⋅m)
2013–2019	Jaguar XJ Portfolio	340 PS (250 kW; 335 hp)	332 lb⋅ft (450 N⋅m)
2013–2015	Jaguar XF Portfolio	340 PS (250 kW; 335 hp)	332 lb⋅ft (450 N⋅m)
2016–2020	Jaguar XF 35t	340 PS (250 kW; 335 hp)	332 lb⋅ft (450 N⋅m)
2016–2020	Jaguar XF Sportbrake S	380 PS (279 kW; 375 hp)	332 lb⋅ft (450 N⋅m)
2015–2019	Jaguar XE 35t	340 PS (250 kW; 335 hp)	332 lb⋅ft (450 N⋅m)
2015–2019	Jaguar XE S	380 PS (279 kW; 375 hp)	332 lb⋅ft (450 N⋅m)
2014-2019	Range Rover (L405)	340 PS (250 kW; 335 hp)	332 lb⋅ft (450 N⋅m)
2014-2019	Range Rover Sport (L494)	340 PS (250 kW; 335 hp)	332 lb⋅ft (450 N⋅m)
2014-2016	Land Rover Discovery 4 / LR4 (L319)	340 PS (250 kW; 335 hp)	332 lb⋅ft (450 N⋅m)
2017-2020	Land Rover Discovery Si6 (L462)	340 PS (250 kW; 335 hp)	332 lb⋅ft (450 N⋅m)
2016-2020	Jaguar F-Pace 35t	340 PS (250 kW; 335 hp)	332 lb⋅ft (450 N⋅m)
2016-2020	Jaguar F-Pace S	380 PS (279 kW; 375 hp)	332 lb⋅ft (450 N⋅m)
2018-2020	Range Rover Velar P340	340 PS (250 kW; 335 hp)	332 lb⋅ft (450 N⋅m)
2018-2020	Range Rover Velar P380	380 PS (279 kW; 375 hp)	332 lb⋅ft (450 N⋅m)

=== Model year changes ===
Over its production span, the AJ133/S underwent several modifications to enhance performance, reliability, and compliance with evolving emission standards. Key changes by model year include:

MY 2010:

- Equipped with 10.5mm cylinder head bolts.
- Utilized a Tsubaki timing chain with a 6.35mm pitch (except for X351 XJ and Land Rover models, which used an 8mm pitch chain from INA).
- Featured Denso engine management.
- Employed a vacuum-actuated supercharger bypass valve.
- Supercharged variants had aluminium coolant crossover pipes.

MY 2011:

- All AJ133 variants transitioned to an INA timing chain with an 8mm pitch
- Introduced revised timing chain guides and tensioners.
- Switched to plastic coolant crossover pipes for supercharged models.

MY 2013 (excluding XKR & XKR-S):

- Upgraded to 11mm cylinder head bolts.
- Adopted Bosch MED17 engine management.
- Implemented an electric supercharger bypass valve.
- Replaced the conventional starter motor with a tandem-solenoid starter motor to accommodate the new Eco Start-Stop system.
- Updated air box assemblies, mass air flow (MAF) sensors, and throttle body.

MY 2014/15:

- Further revised the timing chain guides and tensioners, adding steel reinforcement buttons to the guides.

MY 2016:

- Replaced the 3.0L conventional oil pump with a variable-flow oil pump
- Introduced an electrically heated engine coolant thermostat for the 3.0L

MY 2018:

- Replaced the 5.0L conventional oil pump with a variable-flow oil pump

MY 2021 (specific to F-Pace SVR & F-Type P450/P575):

- Mechanical vacuum pump no longer utilized

MY 2024 (specific to Land Rover Defender and Jaguar F-Pace SVR):

- Updated coolant crossover pipes, replacing the previous plastic components with aluminum (Part No. LR186859 and LR186917).

These updates aimed to address known issues and improve the engine’s overall performance and durability. For instance, the timing chain and tensioner revisions were implemented to enhance reliability. Additionally, the shift to Bosch engine management systems facilitated better integration with modern vehicle electronics and emission control systems.

=== Common problems ===
The AJ133 engine has several documented reliability concerns, particularly among earlier production variants. Although subsequent revisions addressed a number of these issues, certain components remain susceptible to wear or failure with age and mileage. Commonly reported problems include:

Timing chain guide and tensioner wear: Certain early AJ133 applications are susceptible to wear of the timing chain tensioner levers, where the steel tensioner plunger gradually wears into the aluminium guide surface. This can create a groove in the guide, reducing tension on the timing chain and producing a rattling or clicking noise from the front of the engine, particularly at idle and cold start-up. Jaguar Land Rover addressed the issue through revised tensioner and guide designs, incorporating steel inserts into the guides to prevent premature wear. The revised components must be installed as a matched set!

Coolant pipe and crossover pipe leaks: Coolant leaks can develop from various pipes and connections within the cooling system. Earlier 5.0L applications were subject to documented coolant pipe seam failures, while plastic coolant crossover components on certain later applications are also known to deteriorate over time.

Water pump failure: The engine-driven coolant pump on AJ133 engines is susceptible to premature seal leakage and bearing wear, potentially resulting in coolant loss and, if left unaddressed, engine overheating. Symptoms commonly include a gradual drop in coolant level, low-coolant warnings, visible coolant residue around the front of the engine and, in more advanced cases, coolant leakage accompanied by excessive water pump bearing noise or play. Jaguar Land Rover documented this concern in technical service bulletin JTB00278 for Jaguar applications and LTB00352 for Land Rover applications. The manufacturer subsequently introduced multiple revisions to the water pump to improve durability and product quality, with updated components introduced at different production stages.

Fuel injectors problems: The Bosch high-pressure direct-injection fuel system can experience injector clogging and restricted fuel flow, particularly as a result of poor fuel quality or fuel contamination. Symptoms can include rough idling, hard starting, reduced fuel economy, engine misfires, poor running, smoke from the tailpipes, and, in more severe cases, engine detonation. Jaguar Land Rover issued technical service communications addressing injector concerns on 5.0L AJ133 applications, including SSM63697 and SSM63677.

Engine oil leaks: Oil leaks can develop from several sealing points around the engine, most commonly the vacuum pump and upper timing cover gaskets. The vacuum pump is mounted at the front of the upper oil pan and is driven by an auxiliary shaft within the engine block, which also drives both high-pressure fuel pumps (HPFPs), located on the passenger side of the engine in North American applications. Leakage from the upper timing cover gasket on the right-hand cylinder bank (passenger side on North American vehicles) can allow engine oil to accumulate around or drip onto the alternator, potentially contaminating it and causing premature failure. Oil leaks can also develop from the lower timing cover and valve cover gaskets.

PCV valve diaphragm failure: The positive crankcase ventilation (PCV) system incorporates pressure-regulating valves with rubber diaphragms integrated into the camshaft (valve) covers. Over time, these diaphragms can deteriorate or rupture, resulting in an unmetered air leak into the intake system. This can cause rough idling, abnormal fuel trims, lean running conditions and illumination of the malfunction indicator lamp (MIL). Commonly associated diagnostic trouble codes include P2187 (System Too Lean at Idle, Bank 1) and P2189 (System Too Lean at Idle, Bank 2), as well as P0505 and P0507. Jaguar Land Rover issued service communications SSM74375 and SSM74374 addressing diaphragm failures on 3.0L and 5.0L petrol engines, subsequently introducing lower-level repair kits (C2D60163 and LR133579, respectively), allowing replacement of the diaphragm and retaining cover without replacing the complete camshaft cover assembly.

Supercharger coupling (isolator) wear: Supercharged variants equipped with the Eaton TVS supercharger can develop excessive wear in the internal torsional isolator (drive coupler), located within the supercharger's front housing (snout). The isolator incorporates a spring-loaded coupling designed to absorb torsional vibrations between the supercharger input shaft and rotor assembly. Over time, the spring and its supporting components can wear or develop excessive backlash, resulting in a characteristic metallic rattling or clattering noise, particularly at idle and during engine start-up and shutdown. The noise can often be mistaken for timing chain or valvetrain noise. Jaguar Land Rover has issued technical service bulletins addressing this condition, including LTB00482 and JTB00349.

== See also ==
- Jaguar AJ6 engine
- Jaguar AJ-V6 engine
- Jaguar V12 engine
