= Jaguar S-Type (1999) =

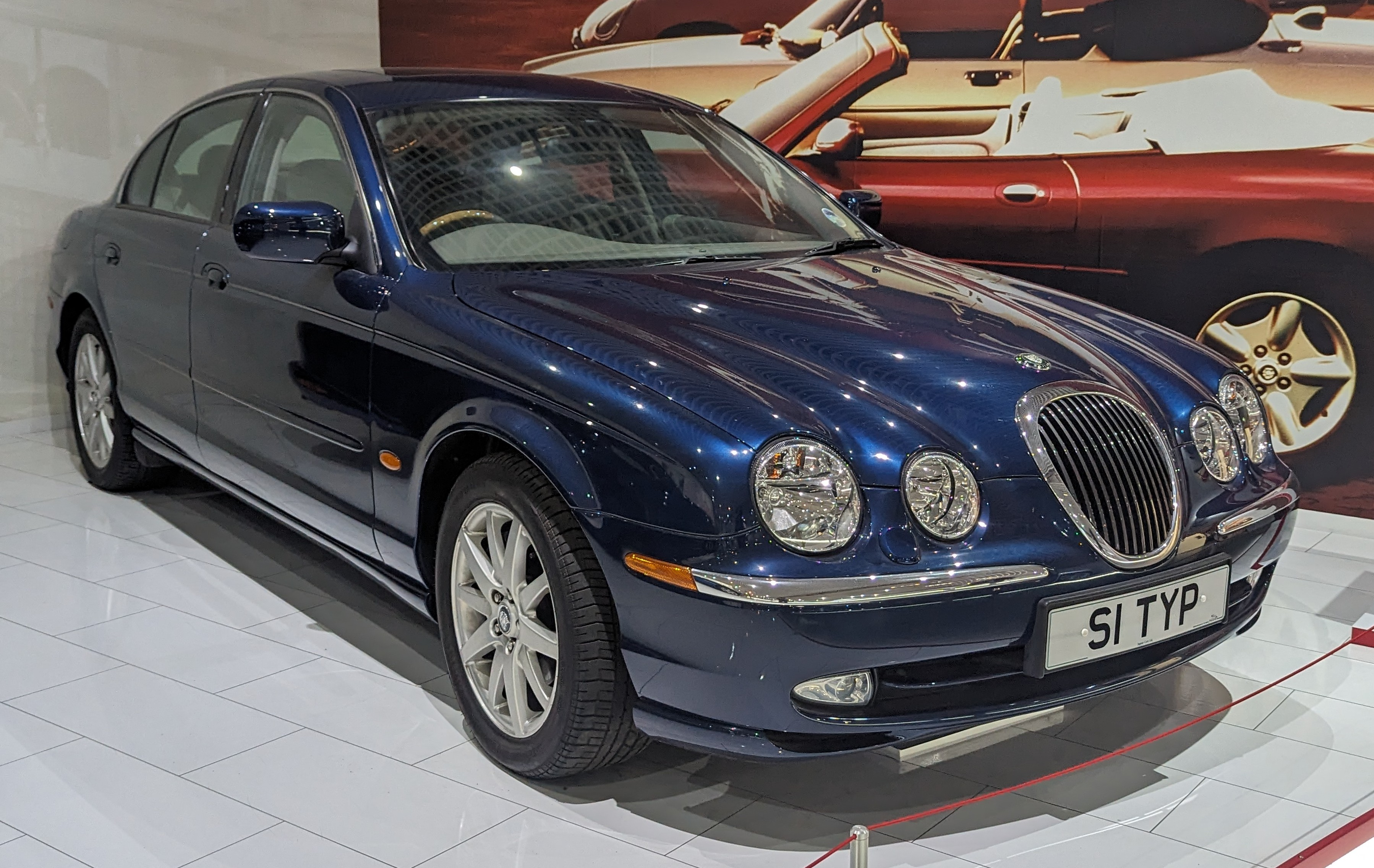

Overview
- Manufacturer: Jaguar Cars
- Model code: X200
- Production: March 1999–2007
- Model years: 1999–2008 (North America)
- Assembly: United Kingdom: Birmingham (Castle Bromwich Assembly)
- Designer: Geoff Lawson (1995); Ian Callum (2004 facelift)

Body and chassis
- Class: Mid-size luxury car / Executive car (E)
- Body style: 4-door notchback saloon
- Layout: FR layout
- Platform: Ford DEW98 platform

Powertrain
- Engine: petrol 2.5 V6; 3.0 V6; 4.0 V8; 4.2 V8; 4.2 s/c V8 diesel 2.7 V6
- Transmission: 5-speed Getrag 221 manual (2.5 & 3.0 V6); 6-speed ZF S6-53 manual (2.7 D); 5-speed Ford 5R55E automatic (Phase 1); 6-speed ZF 6HP 26 J-Gate automatic (Phase 2 & 3)

Dimensions
- Wheelbase: 114.5 in (2,908 mm)
- Length: 2006–2007: 193.41 in (4,913 mm); 2002–2005: 191.10 in (4,854 mm); 2000–2001: 189.3 in (4,808 mm)
- Width: 2006–2007: 71.6 in (1,819 mm); 2000–2005: 71.6 in (1,819 mm)
- Height: 2000–2003: 55.7 in (1,415 mm); 2004–2005: 56.0 in (1,422 mm); 2006–2007: 57.0 in (1,448 mm)
- Kerb weight: 1,800 kg (3,968 lb)

Chronology
- Successor: Jaguar XF (X250)

The Jaguar S-Type (Note: internally designated X200) is an executive car which was made by Jaguar Cars from 1999 until 2007 with a facelift in 2004. It is a four-door saloon car (Note: Also known as a sedan.) with a three-box design and a front-engine, rear-wheel-drive layout.

The S-Type debuted at the 1998 Birmingham Motor Show and revived a nameplate which Jaguar had previously used from 1963 until 1968. Produced at a time when Jaguar was owned by the Ford Motor Company (forming part of its Premier Automotive Group division), the S-Type shares its DEW98 platform with the Lincoln LS and the eleventh-generation Ford Thunderbird. Following its discontinuation it was replaced by the Jaguar XF, which uses a modified version of the same platform.

== Overview ==
After being privatised in 1984, Jaguar had been developing a smaller saloon to complement the XJ6 by the early 1990s, but these plans were axed following its takeover by Ford in 1989, only to resurface within a few years.

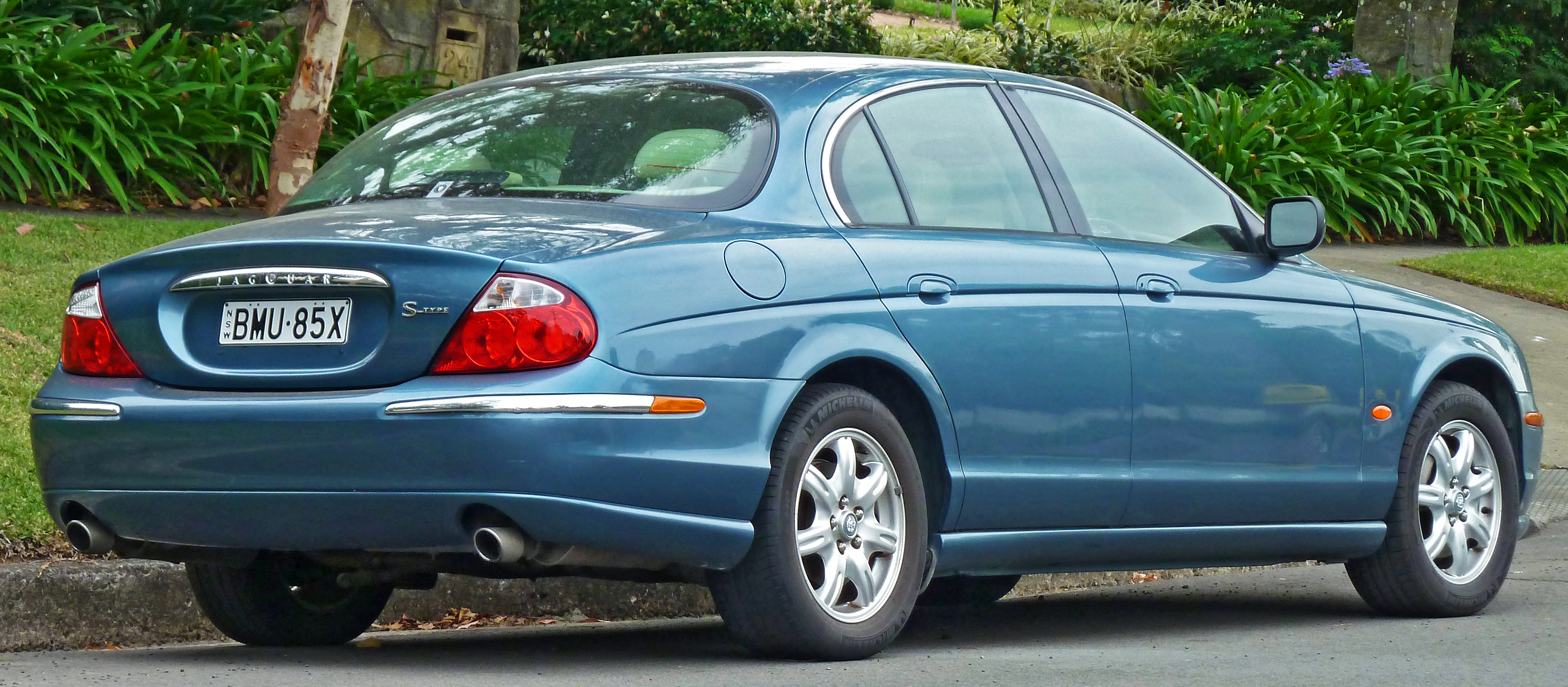
1999–2004 Jaguar S-Type saloon (Australia)

The S-Type was produced at Jaguar's Castle Bromwich facility in Birmingham, England. The car was styled by Geoff Lawson in 1995 and is based on the Jaguar DEW platform/Ford DEW platform, shared with the Lincoln LS and Ford Thunderbird. It was unveiled at the Birmingham International Motor Show on 20 October 1998.

The first S-Types ("X200" 1999–2002) are distinguished by a U-shaped centre console and optional touchscreen navigation system in the 2003 and later models. The optional traditional leaping jaguar bonnet mascot is approved by the US and EU standards and breaks away in the case of an accident. Subsequent models ("X202", "X204", "X206"; the last digit denoting the model year) have the Jaguar logo incorporated within the radiator grille and a more traditional 'looped' styling for the centre console. In Australia, the "leaper" bonnet mascot did not become available until 2004.

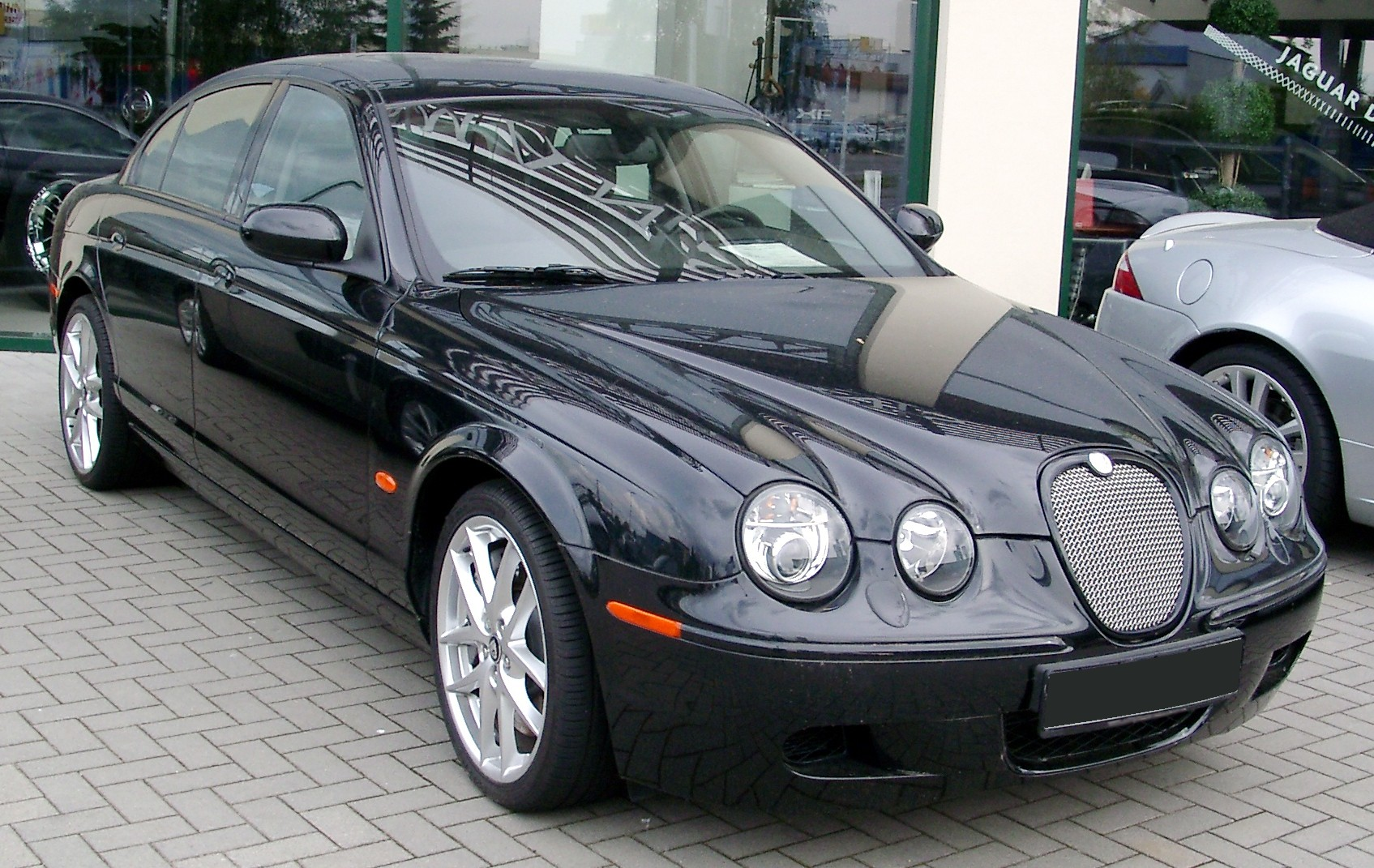
Jaguar S-Type R

The supercharged S-Type R joined the lineup in 2002 as a competitor to BMW's M5 and the Mercedes E55 AMG. The R was powered by the newly revised hand-built 4.2-Litre AJ V8 with an Eaton M112 supercharger, producing 400 hp (298 kW; 406 PS) and capable of accelerating the car from 0 to 60 mph (97 km/h) in 5.3 seconds (0 to 100 km/h (62 mph) in 5.6 s). The top speed was limited to 155 mph. It included 18-inch alloy wheels, wire-mesh grille, and monochromatic paint. The R also has a rear apron, side-skirts, and front apron with built-in fog-lamps, a rear spoiler, a brace located near the rear subframe, and R badging on the boot lid and both front wings.

Also added on the 2003 model was an electronic parking-brake paddle-switch that replaced the conventional manually operated lever for the rear brakes. For the 2003 model year, the Jaguar S-Type was given a six-speed automatic ZF 6HP26 transmission as well as a revised 3.0-litre V6 engine with 235 hp (175 kW) (US spec) versus 240 hp (179 kW) for the 1999 to 2002 models. The 2003 model featured a revised dash, centre console, and a grille with the Jaguar badge to give the vehicle a more Jaguar-like appearance, with a flip-open key devised for the ignition.

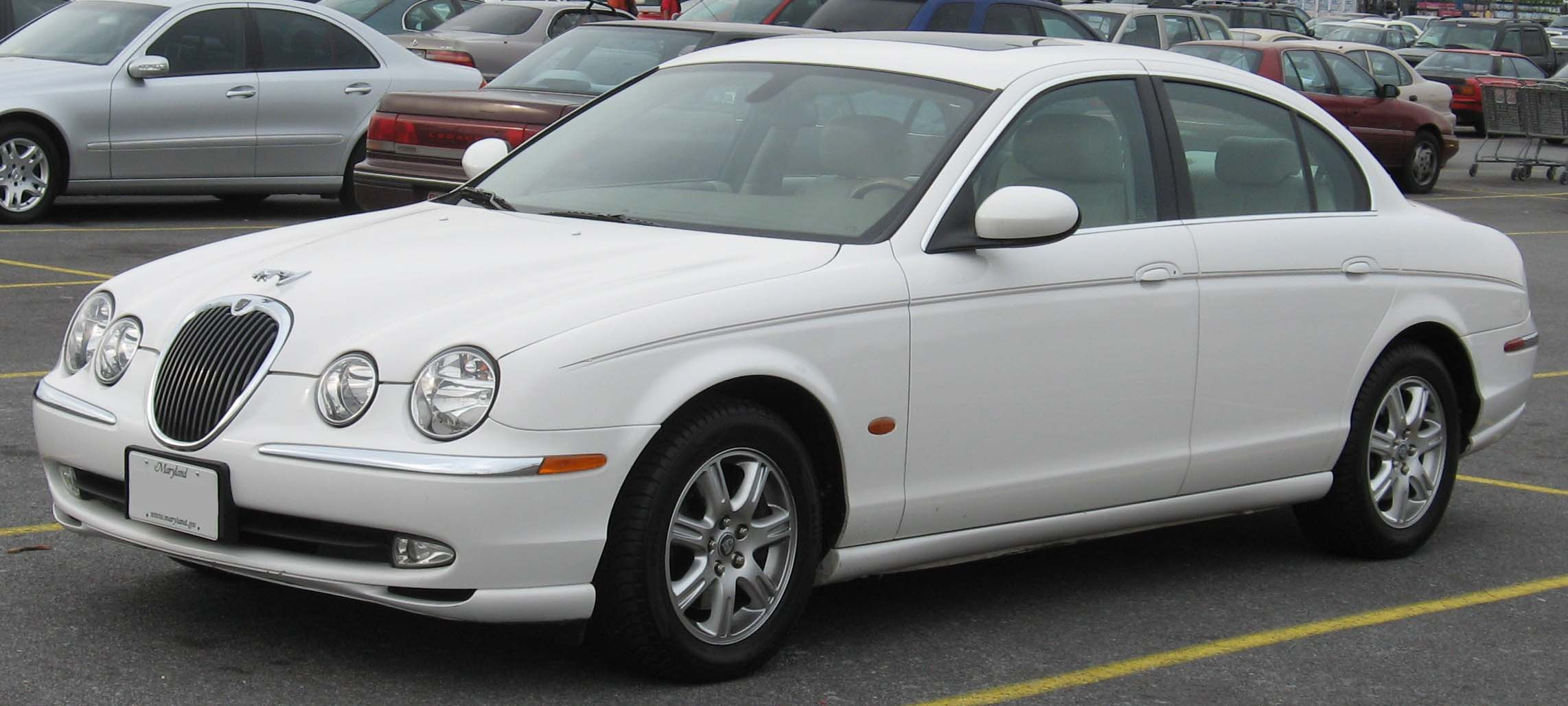
1999–2004 Jaguar S-Type (North America)

A minor facelift on the 2004 model year featured redesigned front and rear aprons, a slightly modified grille, remodelled rear light clusters, an aluminium bonnet, and a new 2.7-litre V6 diesel engine with 207 hp (154 kW). The windscreen washer jets were incorporated into the windscreen wiper arms. There were no changes made to the cabin interior. 2006 to 2007 models featured no fog lights.

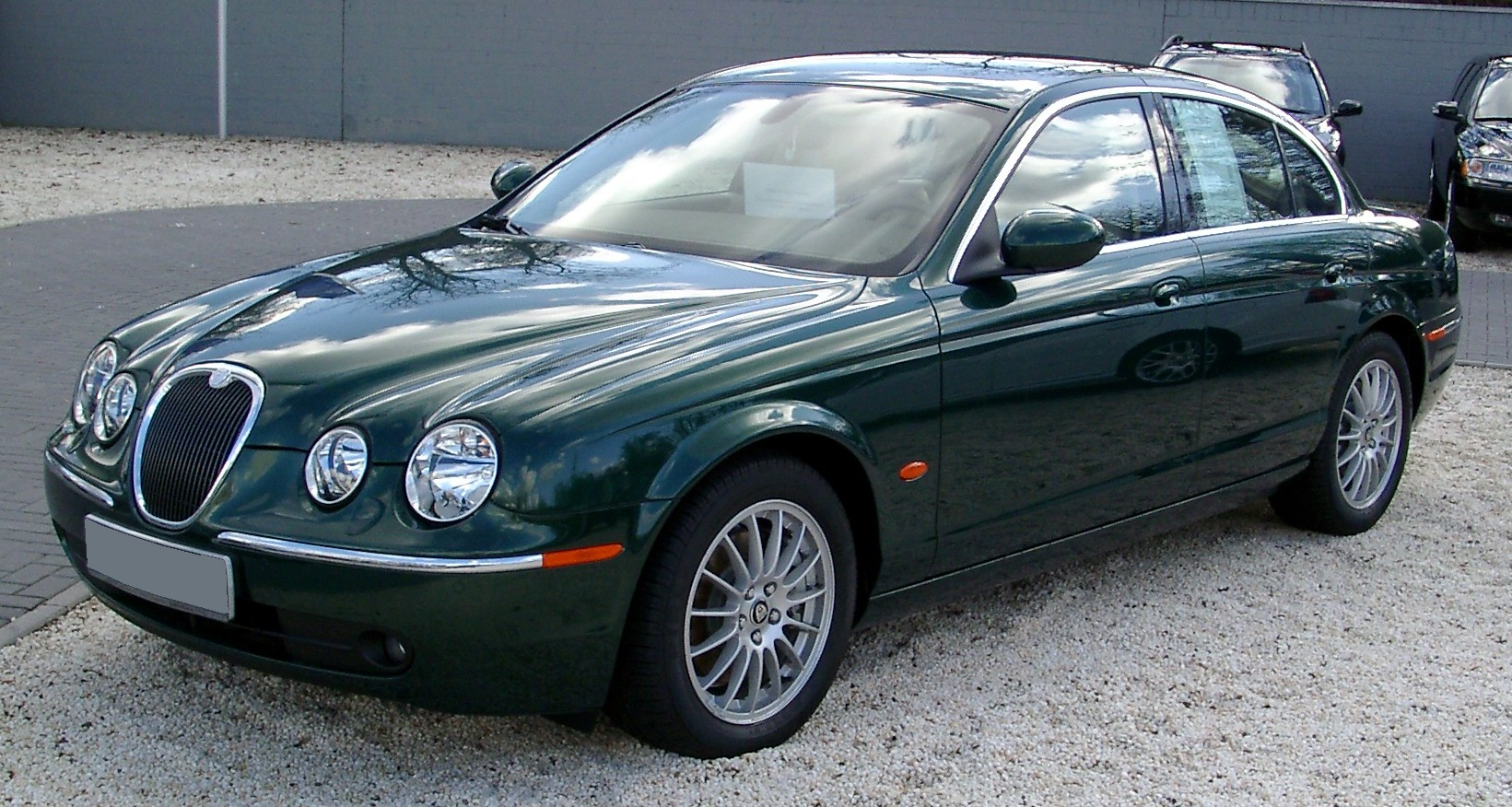
Post-facelift S-Type

There were 291,386 S-Types produced during its production run of 1999 to 2007.

== Powertrain ==
The S-Type was powered by a variety of petrol and diesel engines. At launch, the V8 S-Type was powered by the 4.0L Jaguar AJ-V8 engine, the capacity of which was increased to 4.2L for the 2003 model year. Variants of this engine are used in Ford, Lincoln, Land Rover/Range Rover and Aston Martin models. The V6 petrol engines used were originally conceived by Porsche for use in a replacement 944, before being picked up by Ford to be developed into the Ford Duratec unit which is used extensively throughout the Ford model range (and in Ford subsidiary companies). With the Jaguar 3.0L version benefitting from Jaguar designed heads, variable valve timing and an additional 30bhp over the original Ford Duratec. The 2.5 L V6 engine was not available for vehicles exported to the United States and Canada. Diesel engines are the Ford/Peugeot 2.7L HDi Ford AJD-V6/PSA DT17 which is used in a number of Ford, Peugeot, Citroën, Jaguar and Land Rover models.

From model years 1999 to 2002, the rear-wheel-drive S-Type was equipped with either a five-speed manual or a five-speed J-Gate Ford 5R55N transmission. From 2003, the S-Type was produced with either a 5-speed manual transmission (Getrag 221) or a six-speed J-Gate ( ZF 6HP26 transmission) that allows automatic manual gear selection. The 2004 diesel saw the introduction of a 6-speed manual transmission; it was also available with the six-speed J-Gate automatic transmission.

=== Specifications ===
| Model | 2.5 V6 (Executive) | | V6 Diesel (Executive) | | 3.0 V6 (Executive) | | V8 (Executive) | V8 S/C (S-TYPE R) |
|---|---|---|---|---|---|---|---|---|
| Engine type and Number of cylinders | V6 - petrol | | twin-turbo V6 - diesel | | V6 - petrol | | V8 - petrol | V8 - petrol supercharged (Eaton) |
| Displacement | 2,497 cc | | 2,720 cc | | 2,967 cc | | 4,196 cc | |
| Power | 145 kW (197 PS; 194 hp) @ 6,800 rpm | | 150 kW (204 PS; 201 hp) @ 4,000 rpm | | 180 kW (245 PS; 241 hp) @ 6,800 rpm | | 210 kW (286 PS; 282 hp) @ 6,000 rpm | 290 kW (394 PS; 389 hp) @ 6,100 rpm |
| Torque | 245 N⋅m (181 lb⋅ft) @ 4,000 rpm | | 435 N⋅m (321 lb⋅ft) @ 1,900 rpm | | 293 N⋅m (216 lb⋅ft) @ 4,100 rpm | | 411 N⋅m (303 lb⋅ft) @ 4,100 rpm | 541 N⋅m (399 lb⋅ft) @ 3,500 rpm |
| Top speed | 228 km/h (142 mph) | 225 km/h (140 mph) | 230 km/h (143 mph) | 227 km/h (141 mph) | 250 km/h (155 mph) | 250 km/h (155 mph) | 250 km/h (155 mph) (governed) | |
| 0-60 mph (0–97 km/h) (seconds) | 8.6 | 9.9 | 8.5 | 8.6 | 6.9 | 7.6 (5-speed automatic) 6.9 (6-speed automatic) | 6.5 | 5.6 |
| Transmission | 5-speed manual | 6-speed automatic | 6-speed manual | 6-speed automatic | 5-speed manual | 5-speed automatic (1999-2002); 6-speed automatic (2002-2008) | 6-speed automatic | |
| Fuel consumption (according to EEC Directive combined) in l/100 km | 9.5 L/100 km (30 mpg_{‑imp}; 25 mpg_{‑US}) | 10.3 L/100 km (27 mpg_{‑imp}; 23 mpg_{‑US}) | 6.8 L/100 km (42 mpg_{‑imp}; 35 mpg_{‑US}) | 7.8 L/100 km (36 mpg_{‑imp}; 30 mpg_{‑US}) | 10.3 L/100 km (27 mpg_{‑imp}; 23 mpg_{‑US}) | 10.8 L/100 km (26 mpg_{‑imp}; 22 mpg_{‑US}) | 11.5 L/100 km (25 mpg_{‑imp}; 20.5 mpg_{‑US}) | 12.4 L/100 km (22.8 mpg_{‑imp}; 19.0 mpg_{‑US}) |
By the manufacturer, as of March 2007

== Safety ==
| NHTSA 2008 S-Type | Rating |
|---|---|
| Side Driver: | 4/5 stars |
| Side Passenger: | 5/5 stars |
| Rollover 2WD: | (9.0%) |

== Reception ==
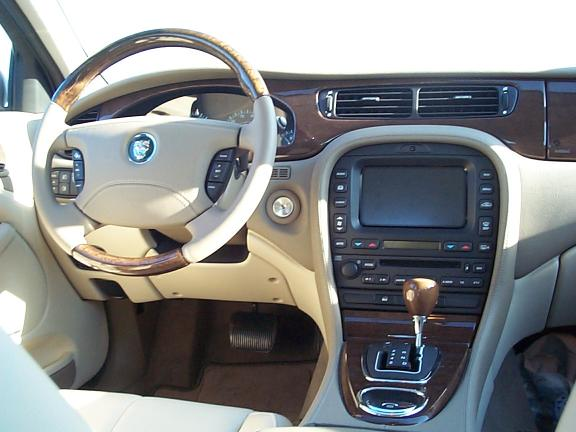
2004 Jaguar S-type interior with optional navigation package

The car was praised on its release for its interior and ride. In particular, the 2.7 V6 twin-turbodiesel engine was described as 'a paragon of refinement, quietness, and fuel economy' by the European automotive press, with enough 'refinement and performance to wean anyone off petrol power'. The supercharged 'R' version was also praised for its speed and for 'proper rear-drive Jag' handling, however, the lack of a limited-slip differential was criticised, along with whine from the Eaton supercharger. The car, particularly the 3.0 Sport manual, was described by the Honest John website, as the spiritual successor to the Jaguar Mark 2.
