= Jaguar AJ-V6 engine =

Car engine

Jaguar AJ-V6
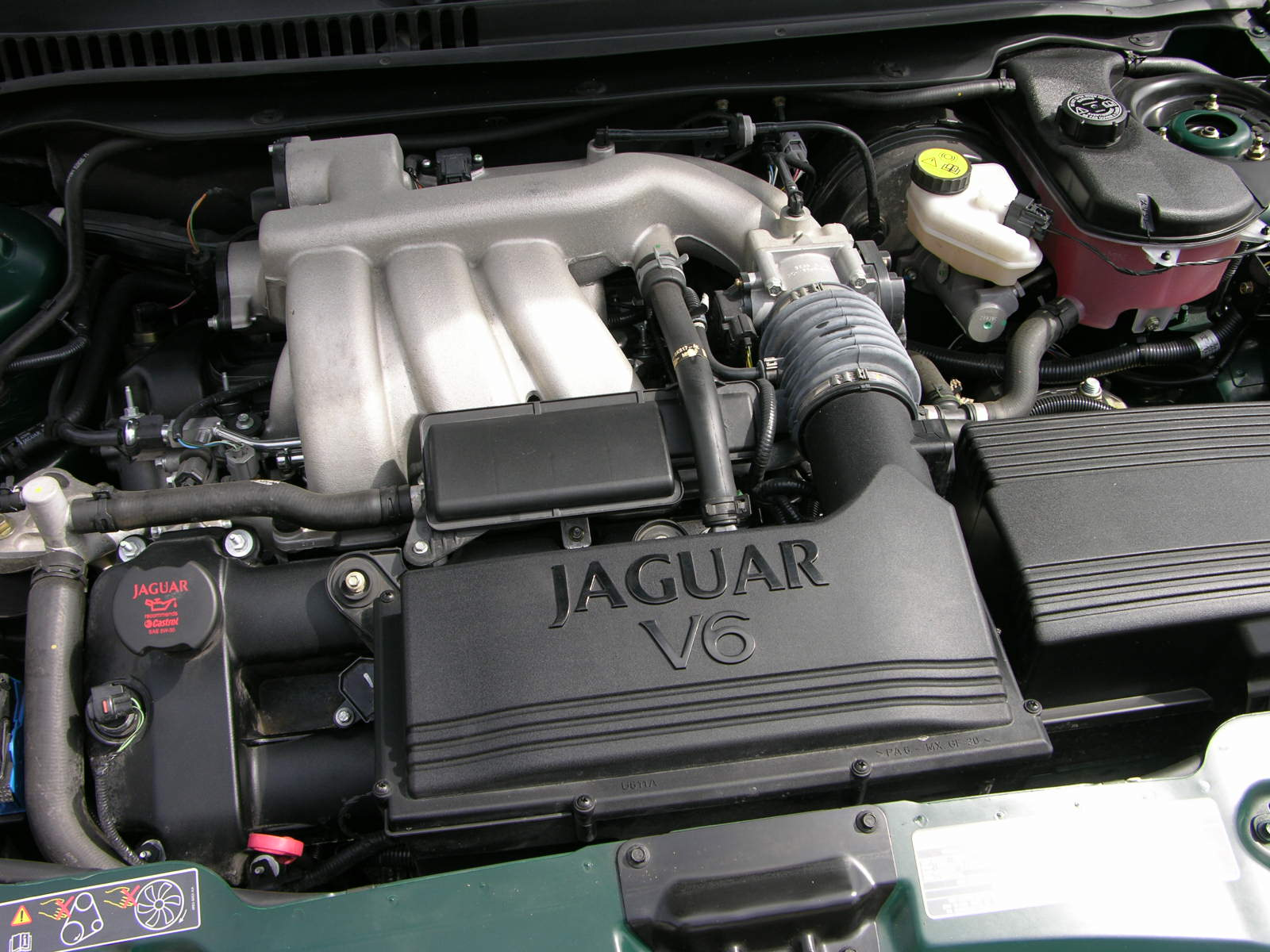
- an AJ-V6 in a Jaguar X-Type

Overview
- Manufacturer: Ford Motor Company for Jaguar Cars
- Designer: Porsche
- Production: 1999–2011

Layout
- Configuration: 60° V6
- Displacement: 2.1 L (2,099 cc; 128.1 cu in); 2.5 L (2,495 cc; 152.3 cu in); 3.0 L (2,967 cc; 181.1 cu in)
- Cylinder bore: 81.6 mm (3.21 in); 89 mm (3.5 in)
- Piston stroke: 66.8 mm (2.63 in); 79.5 mm (3.13 in)
- Cylinder block material: Aluminium
- Cylinder head material: Aluminium
- Valvetrain: DOHC 4 valves x cyl. with VVT
- Compression ratio: 10.3:1, 10.75:1

RPM range
- Max. engine speed: 6,800

Combustion
- Fuel system: Sequential multi-port fuel injection
- Fuel type: Gasoline
- Oil system: Wet sump
- Cooling system: Water-cooled

Output
- Power output: 157–260 hp (117–194 kW; 159–264 PS)
- Torque output: 148–221 lb⋅ft (201–300 N⋅m)

Chronology
- Predecessor: Jaguar AJ16
- Successor: Jaguar AJ126

The Jaguar AJ-V6 engine is a piston engine based on the Ford Duratec V6 engine. The Duratec V6 was originally designed by Porsche, under contract to Ford, using a proprietary Cosworth cylinder head design to meet Ford's design brief. One notable addition is the use of variable valve timing, a feature also shared with Mazda's version of the engine. It is available in 2.1 L (2,099 cc), 2.5 L (2,495 cc) and 3.0 L (2,967 cc) displacements.

The AJ-V6 engine has an aluminium engine block. Its aluminium DOHC cylinder heads were designed by Jaguar Cars. Using sequential fuel injection, it has 4 valves per cylinder with VVT; fracture-split forged powder metal connecting rods; one-piece cast camshaft; and direct-acting mechanical bucket (DAMB) tappets — features that differentiate the AJ-V6 from the Ford and Mazda versions.

== AJ20 ==
The AJ20 version has an 81.6 mm × 66.8 mm (3.21 in × 2.63 in) bore and stroke, and displaces 2,099 cc (128.1 cu in). Although it displaces nearly 2.1-litres, it is marketed as a "2.0". It produces 157 hp (117 kW; 159 PS) and 148 lb⋅ft (201 N⋅m). The compression ratio is 10.75:1.

This engine is used in the following vehicles:

- Jaguar X-Type 2.0 (UK)

== AJ25 ==
The AJ25 displaces 2.5 L (2,495 cc; 152.3 cu in). It shares the AJ20's 81.6 mm (3.21 in) bore and is stroked to 79.5 mm (3.13 in), the same as the AJ30. It delivers 193 hp (144 kW; 196 PS) at 6800 rpm with 178 lb⋅ft (241 N⋅m) of torque at 3000 rpm with 10.3:1 compression.

This engine is used in the following vehicles:

- 2001–2009 Jaguar X-Type 2.5, 193 hp (144 kW; 196 PS) and 180 lb⋅ft (244 N⋅m)
- 2002–2006 Jaguar S-Type 2.5 (UK), 201 hp (150 kW; 204 PS) and 185 lb⋅ft (251 N⋅m)

== AJ30 ==
The AJ30 has an 89 mm (3.5 in) bore and shares the AJ25's 79.5 mm (3.13 in) stroke, giving a displacement of 3.0 L (2,967 cc; 181.1 cu in). In the X-Type, the engine produces 228 hp (170 kW; 231 PS) and 209 lb⋅ft (283 N⋅m). The Jaguar XF debuted a refined version of the AJ30 with continuously variable cam-phasing and variable geometry air intakes to increase power and broaden the powerband up to its 6800 rpm redline.

This engine is used in the following vehicles:

- 2000–2008 Jaguar S-Type, 240 hp (179 kW; 243 PS) and 221 lb⋅ft (300 N⋅m)
- 2002–2009 Jaguar X-Type, 228 hp (170 kW; 231 PS) and 209 lb⋅ft (283 N⋅m)
- 2003–2010 Jaguar XJ, 237 hp (177 kW; 240 PS) and 216 lb⋅ft (293 N⋅m)
- 2008–2011 Jaguar XF 240 hp (179 kW; 243 PS) and 221 lb⋅ft (300 N⋅m)
- 2000–2001 Lincoln LS 210 hp (157 kW; 213 PS) and 205 lb⋅ft (278 N⋅m)
- 2002–2006 Lincoln LS 220 hp (164 kW; 223 PS) and 215 lb⋅ft (292 N⋅m)

== See also ==
- Ford Duratec V6 engine
- Jaguar AJ-V8 engine
