= List of Ford platforms =

This List of Ford platforms features automobile platforms developed by Ford Motor Company, its present-day subsidiaries, as well as those shared from subsidiaries from the past (Mazda, Mercury, Volvo, Jaguar, and Land Rover).

Ford announced in 2014 plans to reduce its vehicle platforms from sixteen to nine. In 2014, Ford vehicles were built on fifteen distinct platforms. This only applies to Ford and Lincoln and not to any brands that were previously held by the company (such as Mazda and Volvo), and is expected to cut costs by 20%.

As of there are five global platforms and four regional platforms. The regional platforms are only sold in some continents and not others.

== Table Fields ==
- Image: Photograph of a single example of each automotive platform.
- Platform: Platform code name, linking to article (in some cases, platform articles are substituted with vehicle articles)
- Type: Refers to types of car classification each platform vehicle falls under
- Drive: Driven wheels in the drivetrain (front, rear, all, or four-wheel drive)
- Production: Years produced, if not currently in production
- Region: Primary market for platform vehicles (on a single platform, this can vary by brand and is noted)
- Example(s): The nameplates produced on the platform
- VIN code: code on the VIN that designates each platform variation (typically with several vehicles produced on a single platform)

== List ==
=== Current Ford platforms ===
Virtually all Ford and Lincoln vehicles will use these platforms globally by 2024.

Platform/Type	Region	Vehicles
B-Class (subcompact)	Worldwide	Transit Courier / Puma
C-Class (compact)	Worldwide	Focus / Escape / Kuga / Bronco Sport / Maverick / Transit Connect / Lincoln Corsair
D-Class (midsize)	Worldwide	Mondeo / Edge / Lincoln Nautilus / Lincoln Z
E-Class (fullsize sedan/CUV)	North America, Asia, Middle East (GCC)	Police Interceptor Sedan/Utility / Explorer / Lincoln Aviator
S-Class (sports car)	Worldwide	Mustang
Midsize pickup/SUV	Worldwide	Ranger / Everest / Bronco
Full-size truck/SUV	North America (limited export)	F-150 / Expedition / Lincoln Navigator
Medium commercial truck	North America	Super Duty (F-250 through F-550)
Heavy commercial truck	North America	Super Duty (F-650, F-750)
Heavy commercial truck	Worldwide	F-Line / F-Max
Midsize van	Worldwide	Transit Custom / Tourneo Custom
Full-size van	Worldwide	Transit / Tourneo

=== Current Ford platforms (global) ===
Current Ford Motor Company platforms (global)
Platform Name/ Vehicle Image	Type	Drive	Production	Region	Example(s)	VIN code
C2	Compact; Compact CUV; Mid-size luxury car; Executive	FWD/AWD	2018–present	Worldwide	Ford Ford Focus Mk IV; Ford Focus Active; Ford Escape (fourth generation); Ford Kuga Mk III; Ford Maverick; Ford Bronco Sport; Ford Mondeo Sport; Ford Mondeo (China); Ford Edge L Lincoln Lincoln Corsair; Lincoln Z Lincoln Nautilus	
Global Electrified 1 (GE1) (heavily modified C2 platform)	Compact CUV	RWD/AWD	2020–present	Worldwide	Ford Mustang Mach-E	
Ford D2C platform	Coupe; Pony car; Convertible	RWD	2004-present	Worldwide	Ford Mustang	

=== Historic Ford Motor Company platforms (global) ===
Historic Ford Motor Company platforms (global)
Platform/Image	Type	Drive	Production	Region	Example(s)	VIN code
CD4	Mid-size; Mid-size luxury car; Mid-size crossover SUV; Full-size luxury car; Minivan/MPV	FWD/AWD	2012-2024	Worldwide	Ford Ford Fusion/Mondeo; Ford Taurus (seventh generation); Ford Edge; Ford S-Max; Ford Galaxy Lincoln Lincoln MKZ; Lincoln Continental (2017); Lincoln MKX	
C1	Compact; Mini MPV; Minivan; Compact CUV	FWD/AWD	2003–2023	Worldwide	Ford Ford C-MAX; Ford Focus Mk III; Ford Escort; Ford Kuga Mk II; Ford Escape (third generation); Ford Transit Connect Mk II; Escort (China) Lincoln Lincoln MKC	
D3	Mid-size; Full-size; Full-size luxury car; Mid-size crossover SUV; Large crossover SUV	FWD/AWD	2004–2019	North America (limited export worldwide)	Ford Ford Five Hundred; Ford Freestyle; Ford Taurus (fifth generation); Ford Taurus X Ford Taurus (sixth generation); Ford Police Interceptor Lincoln Lincoln MKS Mercury Mercury Montego; Mercury Sable	
Panther	Full-size; Full-size luxury car	RWD	1979–2011	North America (limited export worldwide)	Ford Ford LTD; Ford Country Squire; Ford Crown Victoria; Ford Police Interceptor Mercury Mercury Marquis; Mercury Colony Park; Mercury Marauder; Mercury Grand Marquis Lincoln Lincoln Continental; Continental Mark VI; Lincoln Town Car	Ford Crown Victoria: P70, P71, P7B, P72 P73, P74, P75 (1992 Touring Sedan only); Lincoln Town Car: M81, M82, M83, M84, M85 M86, M87, M88, M89; Mercury Grand Marquis: M70, M74, M75; Mercury Marauder: M75, M79
E8	Full-size car Coupé utility	RWD	2008–2016	Australia	Ford Falcon (FG)/FPV FG GS/F6/GT/GT-P/GT E/F6 E	
EA169	Full-size	RWD	1998–2008	Australia	Ford AU/BA/BF Falcon/Fairmont; Ford Territory; Ford Fairlane; Ford LTD	
EA26	Full-size	RWD	1988–1997	Australia	Ford Falcon EA/EB/ED/EF/EL	
SN-95	Pony car	RWD	1993–2004	North America	Ford Mustang	P4
DEW98	Personal luxury car; Mid-size luxury car	RWD	1999–2006	North America	Ford Ford Thunderbird Lincoln Lincoln LS	
FN10	Personal luxury car	RWD	1992-1998	North America	Lincoln Mark VIII	
MN12	Personal luxury car	RWD	1988–1997	North America	Ford Ford Thunderbird Mercury Mercury Cougar	
Fox	Mid-size; Pony car; Personal luxury car	RWD	1977–1993	North America	Ford Ford Fairmont; Ford Granada; Ford LTD; Ford Mustang; Ford Thunderbird Mercury Mercury Capri; Mercury Cougar; Mercury Marquis; Mercury Zephyr Lincoln Lincoln Continental; Continental Mark VII; Lincoln Mark VII	
CD3	Mid-size; Mid-size luxury car; Mid-size crossover SUV	FWD/AWD	2005-2015	North America	Ford Ford Edge; Ford Fusion (first generation) Lincoln Lincoln MKX; Lincoln Zephyr/MKZ Mercury Mercury Milan	P8
EUCD	Mid-size; Minivan/MPV	FWD/AWD	2007–2015	Worldwide (excluding North America)	Ford Galaxy; Ford Mondeo; Ford S-Max	
CDW27/CD132	Mid-size	FWD	2000–2009	Worldwide (only as Jaguar in North America)	Ford Mondeo; Jaguar X-Type	
CDW27/CD162	Mid-size	FWD	1996–2000	Worldwide (excluding North America)	Ford Mondeo	
CDW27	Mid-size	FWD	1992–2006	Worldwide	Ford Contour; Mercury Mystique; Ford Mondeo; Ford/Mercury Cougar	
C170	Compact	FWD	1998–2011	Worldwide	Ford Focus Mk I Ford Focus Mk II (North America)	P3
CT120	Compact	FWD/4WD	1989–2002	North America	Ford Escort; Mercury Tracer	
CA11	Compact	FWD	1985-1992	North America (Mercury); Asia (Ford); Oceania (Ford); South America (Ford); Africa (Ford)	Ford Laser; Mercury Tracer	
CE14	Compact	FWD	1980–2004	North America; Europe (Ford); South America (Ford and Volkswagen); Africa (Ford); New Zealand (Ford)	Ford Ford Escort; Ford EXP; Ford Tempo; Ford Escort; Ford Orion; Ford Verona Mercury Mercury LN7; Mercury Lynx; Mercury Topaz Volkswagen Apollo	
TC	Midsize	RWD	1973–1994	West Europe; United Kingdom; South Africa; Argentina; Turkiye	Ford Taunus Ford CortinaFord P100	
DE-1	Mid-size/Full-size; Pick-up	RWD/AWD	1982-1998	North America (Merkur); Europe; South America; Africa; New Zealand	Ford Sierra/Merkur XR4Ti; Ford P100; Ford Scorpio/Granada III; Merkur Scorpio	
B	Subcompact; Sport compact; Compact pickup truck; Small van	FWD	1976–2003	Worldwide (excluding North America)	Ford Fiesta; Ford Ka Mk1; Ford Puma; Ford Courier; Ford Bantam	
B3	Subcompact; Mini MPV; Subcompact CUV	FWD	2002–2023	Worldwide	Ford Figo; Ford Ka; Ford Transit/Tourneo Courier Mk I Ford EcoSport Mk II; Ford Fiesta Mk V - VI - VII; Ford B-MAX; Ford Ikon; Ford Fusion (Europe)	
GD	Compact; Sport compact	FWD/4WD	1987–1992	North America	Ford Probe; Mazda 626; Mazda MX-6	
SA30	Sport compact	FWD	1989–1994	Australia; North America	Ford Capri; Mercury Capri	

=== Ford Global Truck/Van/SUV/CUV platforms (current/historic) ===
Ford Global Truck/Van/SUV/CUV platforms (current/historic)
Platform Name/Image	Type	Drive	Production	Region	Example(s)	VIN code
PN105/106	Compact pickup truck	RWD/4WD	1982–2011	North America; South America	Ford Ranger; Mazda B-Series	R
J97M/T6	Compact pickup truck Mid-size SUV	RWD/4WD	2006–2023	Worldwide (Ranger only)	Ford Ford Everest; Ford Ranger Mazda Mazda BT-50	
P2/P3/P4	Full-size pickup truck	RWD/4WD	1998–2009	North America	Ford Ford F-Series; Ford Super Duty Lincoln Lincoln Blackwood; Lincoln Mark LT	X/F/W
CD2	Compact SUV	FWD/4WD	2000–2012	Worldwide	Ford Escape; Mazda Tribute; Mercury Mariner	U0/U9
UN46/UN105	Mid-size SUV; Luxury SUV	RWD; 4WD; AWD	1990–2003	North America (Limited export worldwide)	Ford Ford Explorer; Ford Explorer Sport; Ford Explorer Sport Trac Mazda Mazda Navajo Mercury Mercury Mountaineer	
UN152	Mid-size SUV; Luxury SUV	RWD; 4WD; AWD	2000–2005	North America (Limited export worldwide)	Ford Ford Explorer; Ford Explorer Sport Trac Lincoln Lincoln Aviator Mercury Mercury Mountaineer	
U251	Mid-size SUV; Luxury SUV	RWD; 4WD; AWD	2005–2010	North America	Ford Ford Explorer Mercury Mercury Mountaineer	
E8/E265A	Large crossover SUV	RWD/AWD	2011–2016	Australia	Ford Territory	
EA169/E265	Large crossover SUV	RWD/AWD	2004–2011	Australia	Ford SY Territory/FPV F6X	
D4	Large crossover SUV; Luxury crossover SUV	FWD/AWD	2008–2019	North America	Ford Ford Flex; Ford Explorer (MY 2011-on) Lincoln Lincoln MKT	
CD6	Mid size crossover SUV	FWD/AWD	2019–present	North America	Ford Ford Explorer Lincoln Lincoln Aviator	
T1	Large SUV; Luxury SUV	RWD/AWD	2006–2017	North America	Ford Expedition; Lincoln Navigator	
P254	Expanded-length SUV	RWD/4WD	1999–2005	North America	Ford Excursion	U4
V362	Midsize van; Minivan	FWD	2012–	EMEA	Ford Transit Custom	
V347/V348/V363N	Full-size van; Minibus	FWD/RWD	2006–present	Worldwide	Ford Transit; Ford Tourneo	
V227	Cargo van; Compact MPV	FWD	2003–2012	Worldwide	Ford Tourneo Connect; Ford Transit Connect	
VN	Full-size van; Bus chassis	RWD	1974–present	North America (Commercial vehicle only)	Ford Club Wagon; Ford E-Series; Ford Econoline	C/E/S
V2	Large minivan	FWD/AWD	1998–2007	North America	Ford Windstar; Ford Freestar; Mercury Monterey	A2/A5
VN1	Large minivan	RWD/AWD	1985–1997	North America	Ford Aerostar	
H298 – H476 – H566	Heavy truck	RWD	2003–2019	EMEA, Brazil	Ford Cargo	
H567	Medium duty truck	RWD/AWD	2016–2022	North America	Ford F-650/F-750	
H625	Heavy truck	RWD	2019–	EMEA	Ford F-Max	
