= Peter Horbury =

British car designer (1950–2023)

Peter Douglas Horbury (27 January 1950 – 29 June 2023) was a British car designer widely known for his design work for Volvo and his roles as Executive Design Director, Americas for Ford (2004-2009), Chief Designer at Ford's Premier Automotive Group, Executive Vice President of Design at Geely Auto between 2011 and 2021 — and as Senior Vice President of Design at Lotus.

Widely noted for returning Volvo to prominence in the design world — Horbury led the design of more than fifty cars over the course of his fifty year career, including the Volvo C70, V70, V50 and XC90, Ford Flex, Chrysler Horizon, Lynk & Co 01 and LEVC TX, Lotus Eletre — as well as the Ford Interceptor and Lincoln MKR concepts.

Automotive News Europe noted that Horbury possessed an infectious natural charm, humor and modesty — in sharp contrast to many ego-driven automotive personalities. Auto Design Magazine said Horbury "was not simply a designer. He was a brilliant mind with a deep knowledge about how we, human beings, interact with that complex object called automobile."

Horbury received UK magazine, Autocar's, Designer of the Year in 1998 as well as the 2020 Car Design News Lifetime Achievement Award.

== Background ==
The son of Donald Horbury (1926-1981), Peter was born on 27 January 1950 in Alnwick, England, attending King Edward VII School in Sheffield coincidentally in the same school year as prominent British car designer, Martin Smith.

In 2020, Horbury told Car Design News, that his father had "let me into the secret of drawing in simple perspective when I was extremely young. I was already drawing cars, buses and ships and he showed me how to draw another pencil line to show the front of the bus I was sketching, the wheel at the other side and where the window pillars should go. Suddenly the drawing came to life. It was a strange experience but one that I’ll remember forever," adding that "when I was about nine or ten, I started looking at vehicles and imagining the next one. I’d take the latest Ford Anglia, Triumph TR3 or whatever was current in the late 50s, pick out features that were characteristic of those models and draw future versions. It just seemed to be what a car designer must do."

Horbury later studied at Newcastle College, graduating in 1972 with a degree in Industrial Design. He later attended the Royal College of Art in London graduating with a master's degree in automotive design in 1974.

In an interview with the New York Times, Horbury noted in 1998, he kept his work separate from his family life. His wife and children live in England, and he then worked a full week in Sweden, returning home on weekends. He said, "the only car pictures at my home in England are the ones my son draws."

Horbury died suddenly while traveling in China on 29 June 2023, at age 73. Following a memorial service in Gothenburg, Sweden, a commemoration at the University of Warwick was attended by friends and colleagues from across Europe and China. At the service, he was remembered as "the quiet king of car design."

In late 2023, Car Design News inaugurated the Peter Horbury Fellowship Award to honor the late designer's contributions to the automotive industry, his impact on the design community and his ability to nurture young creative talent. The first of the fellowship awards was presented by Horbury's widow, Elisabeth Mona Jotun Viden Horbury.

== Career ==
=== Early career ===
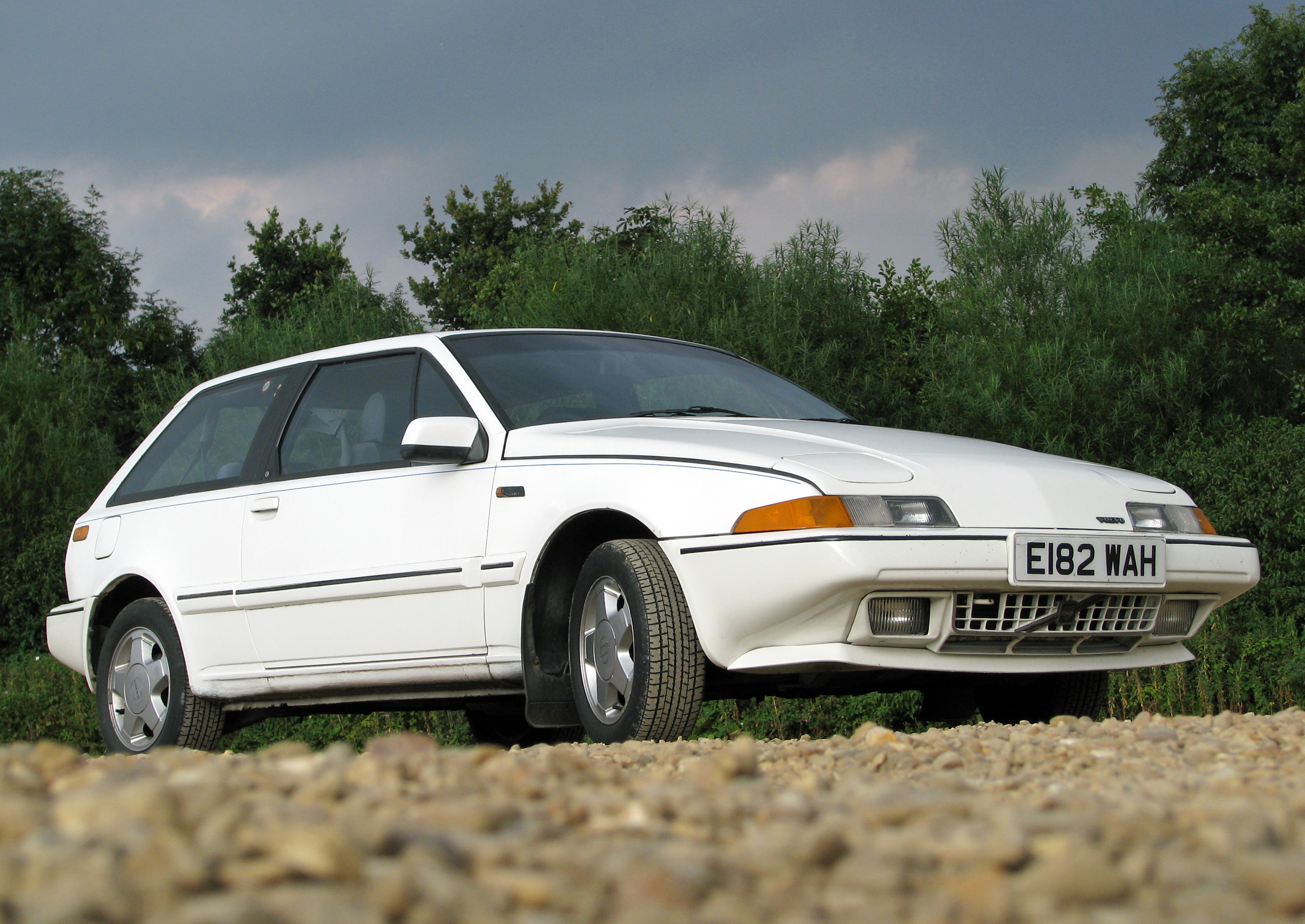
Volvo 480 ES

Horbury started his career at Chrysler UK and subsequently at Volvo Cars in the Netherlands, working on the 480ES coupe. He remarked in the past that the Volvo grill under the bumper of the 480ES was a last-minute addition prior to release, when senior Volvo management realised that the car would not have the classic Volvo grille and slanting highlight. Immediately prior to his longer second 'remarkable' stint at Volvo, Horbury had worked in the United Kingdom for MGA Developments Ltd. In addition he worked on some key Ford product programs in Europe, such as the Sierra, Escort and Granada.

=== Volvo Cars ===
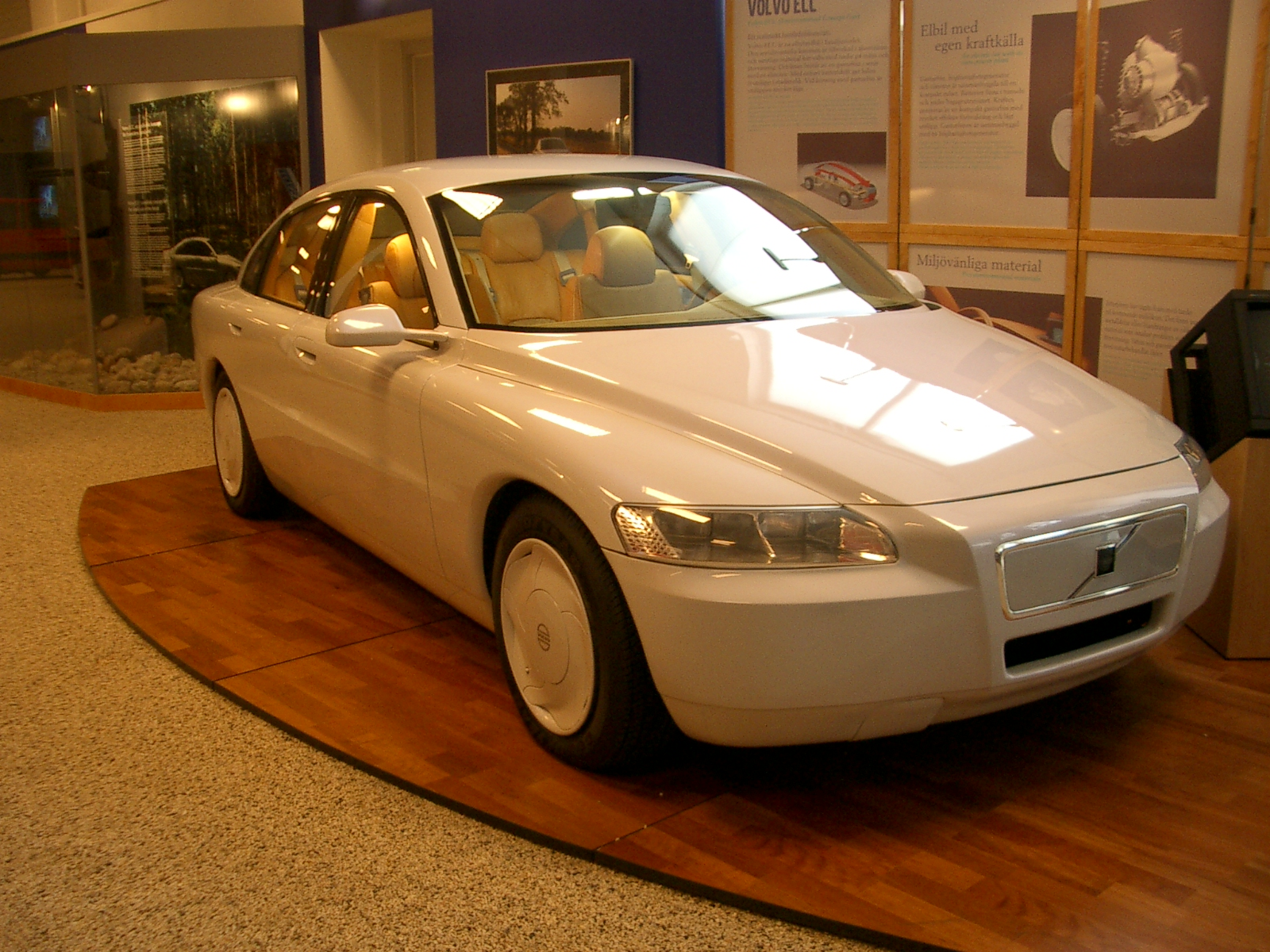
Volvo ECC

Horbury is widely known for leading the revival of the Volvo brand during his eleven years from 1991 as Design Director. Arriving after the 1992 Volvo 850 had been styled, Horbury made an impact with the 1992 Volvo ECC Concept that would influence Volvo design for years to come. He was instrumental in moving the company beyond their traditional boxy look with a new design language for the brand. This new look was characterised by distinctive shoulder lines that ran the length of the car, more curved surfaces, rounded noses, and softer, less utilitarian interiors. He contributed to many designs including the Mitsubishi Carisma related 1995 S40 and V40, the sporty 1997 Volvo C70, which was engineered in collaboration with TWR, closely followed by the 1998 S80. He also contributed to the remaining line up with the 2000 V70 station wagon, the 2001 S60, the 2003 XC90 SUV, and the 2004 S40 and V50. He also oversaw the 1998 facelift of the Volvo 850 series which transformed them into the Volvo S70 and V70 series. During this stint he also worked on the 2006 C70, 2006 V70, 2006 S80, with the last Horbury Volvo of this era being the 2006 C30. Ex-Mercedes-Benz designer Steve Mattin assumed the responsibility of Design Director of Volvo in 2005.

=== Ford ===
In 2002, after having been offered a position with General Motors, Horbury joined Ford as head of its Premier Automotive Group design studios which included Jaguar, Land Rover, Aston Martin, and Volvo. With talented designers in charge of each of PAG's brands' design, Horbury had little to do and in January 2004 was promoted to Ford of America as Executive Design Director of all Ford's American brands, reporting to Ford's group vice president of Design, J Mays. Mays explained the decision:

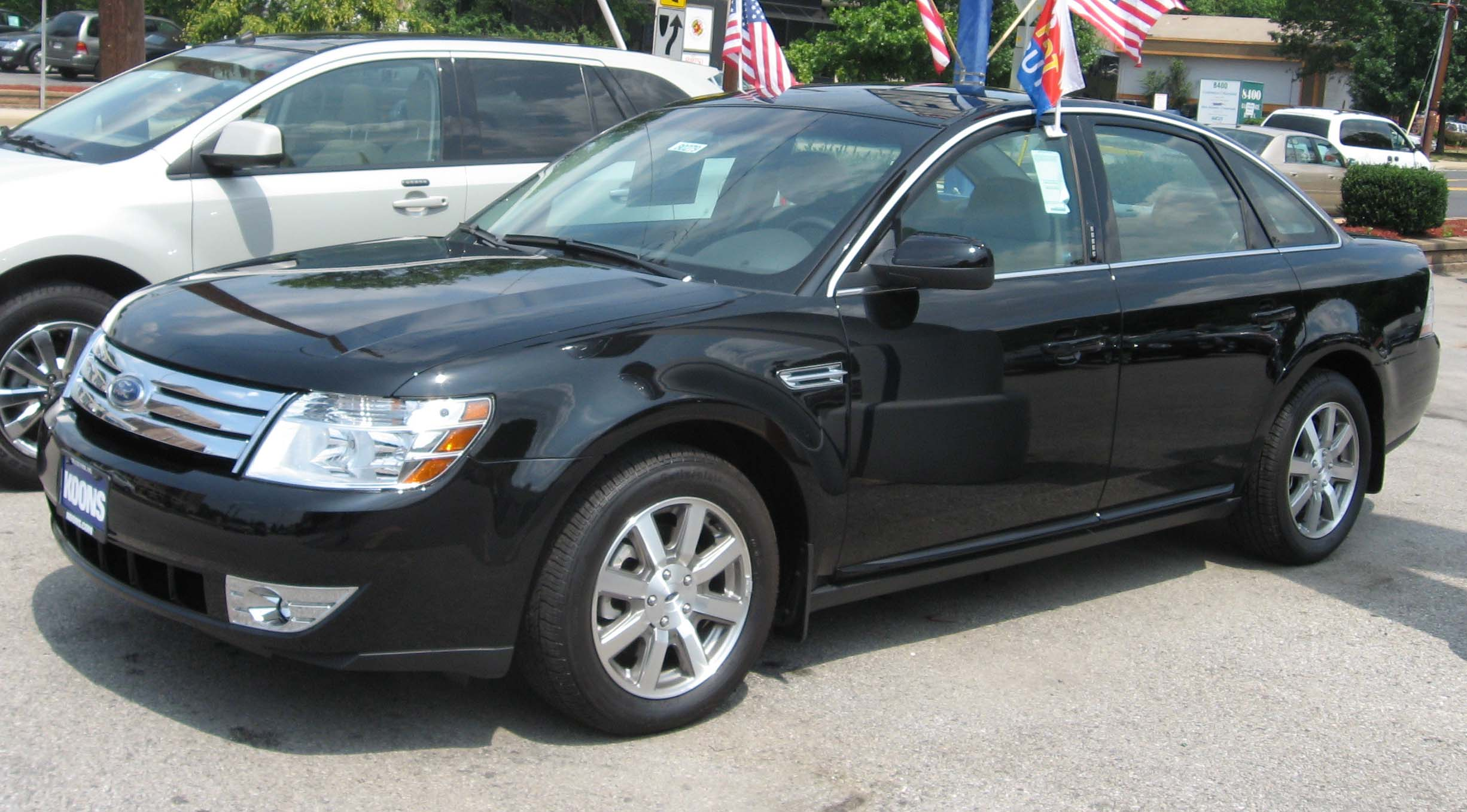
2008 Ford Taurus

"We tapped Peter to lead our North American design team for two key reasons: First, he brings to this team nearly three decades of experience as a strong designer and an even better leader. Second, North America remains our most profitable market, and that’s where we need to invest our top design talent. We are more heavily investing in refining the design DNA for this market’s products. So, naturally, I want this team to have even more power to get the job done."

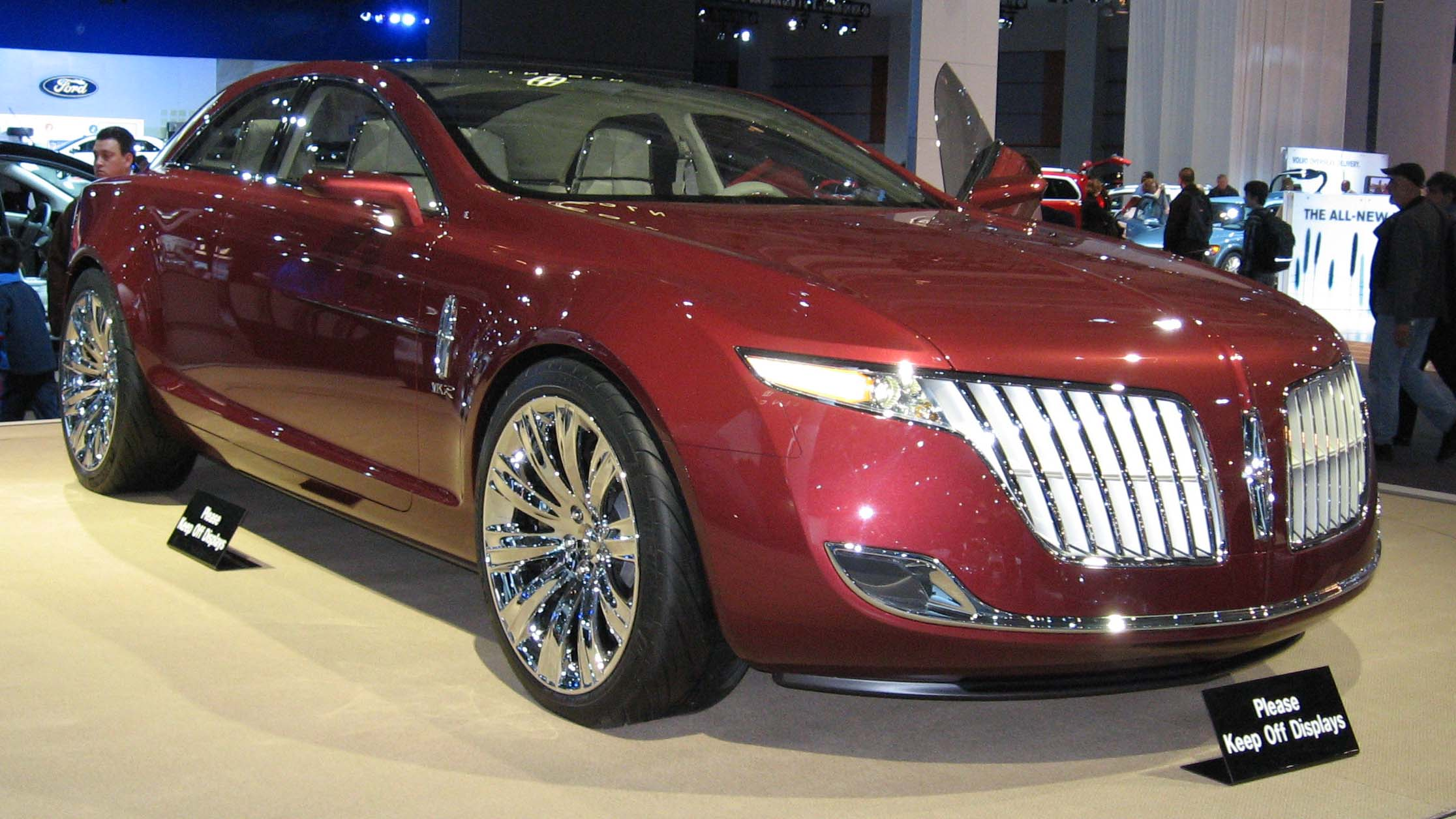
Lincoln MKR

Horbury ran a staff of 800 including Patrick Schiavone and Moray Callum and was given the task of renewing the design language of all of Ford America's brands in the wake of sliding sales. He was responsible for the implementation of Ford's 'Red, White and Bold' design strategy that aimed to make American Fords more distinctively American in their aesthetic. This is especially the case with the forthright 'Hi I'm Dave' three bar chrome grilles as illustrated by the 2006 Ford Fusion, 2008 Ford Focus, 2008 Ford Taurus, 2008 Ford Taurus X, 2010 Ford Taurus, 2010 Ford Fusion and 2009 Ford Flex – all vehicles designed/facelifted under his supervision. He also oversaw the introduction of a similarly bold frontal treatment to Lincoln as previewed by the 2007 Lincoln MKR concept revealed at the 2007 North American International Auto Show in Detroit, followed by the 2009 Lincoln MKS, 2010 Lincoln MKT, facelifted 2010 Lincoln MKZ, and facelifted 2011 Lincoln MKX. The thinking was to infuse Ford's American brands with a distinctive style in an attempt to make them more appealing to American buyers who are demanding riskier designs that are recognisable from distance.

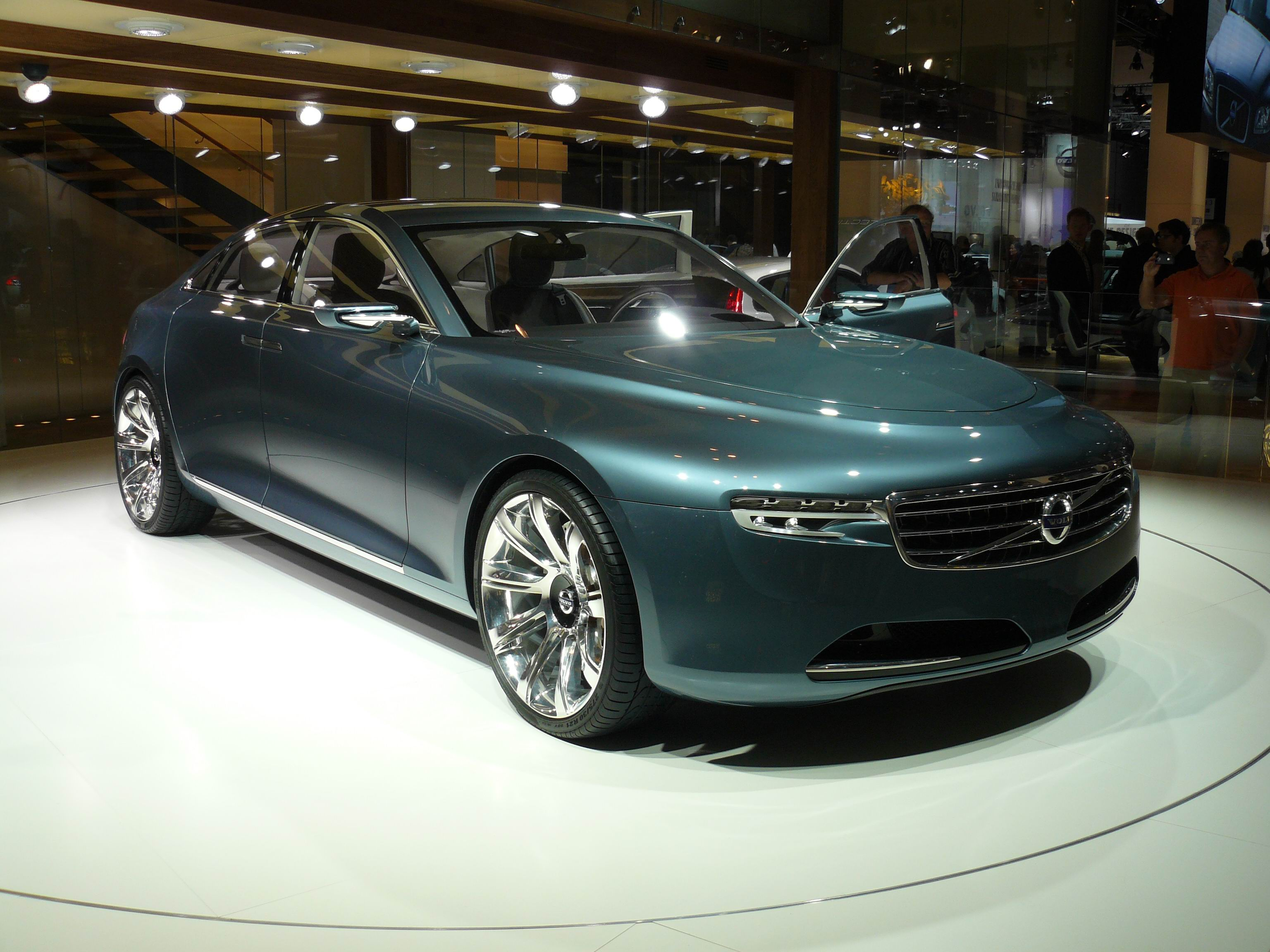
Volvo Concept You at the 2011 Frankfurt Motor Show

=== Return to Volvo Cars ===
In May 2009, Horbury returned to Volvo as Vice President, Design, replacing Steve Mattin who left the company at the end of March 2009. The first public sight of his work from his third stint at Volvo, and the first for Volvo's new owners Geely, was the Volvo Concept Universe shown at the 2011 Shanghai Motor Show.

=== Geely Auto ===
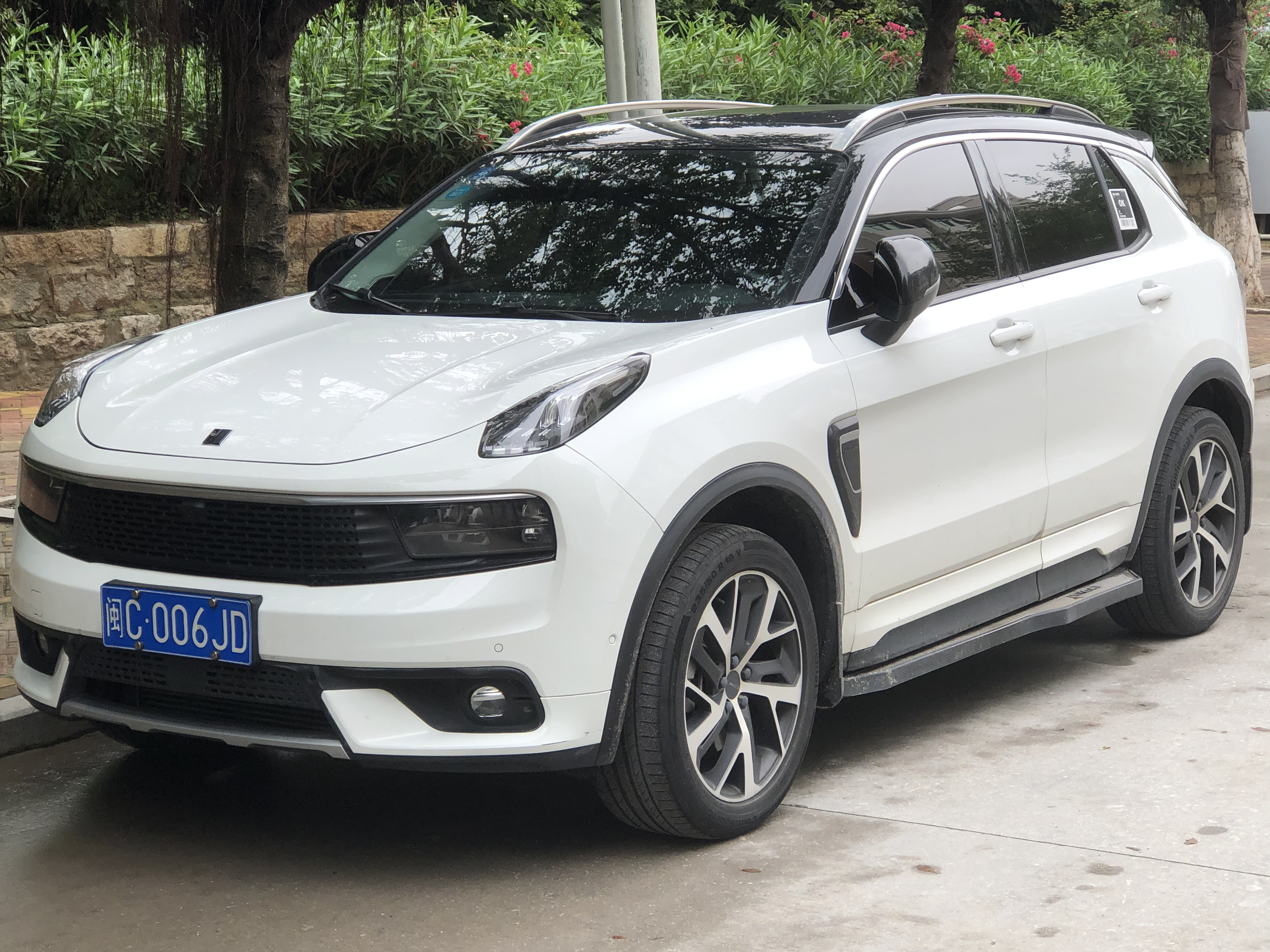
Lynk & Co 01

In late 2011, Horbury was appointed Senior Vice President of Design for Geely with the responsibility of overseeing the design of all Geely brands and establishing a network of Geely design studios around the world. In this role he supervised the design work of Geely's brands, including Geely, Lynk & Co, Proton, and Lotus.

=== Lotus Cars ===
After a decade leading all of the Geely brands' designs, and at the age of 71, Horbury stepped back from his Geely role and joined Lotus as Senior Vice President Design. In this newly created role, Horbury oversaw the activities of existing Lotus designers Russell Carr and Ben Payne, and their respective studios in Norfolk and Coventry, forming a vital link into China and the wider Geely design network.
