= Ford Interceptor =

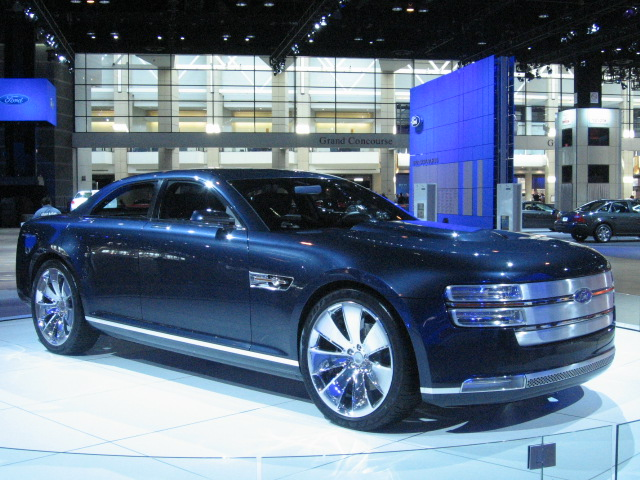

Overview
- Manufacturer: Ford
- Production: 2007 (Concept car)
- Designer: Peter Horbury; Andres Nillson

Body and chassis
- Class: Full-size sports sedan
- Body style: 4-door sedan
- Layout: FR layout
- Platform: Ford D2C platform
- Related: Ford Mustang; Lincoln MKR

Powertrain
- Engine: 5.0L V8 (E85 compatible)
- Transmission: 6-speed manual

Dimensions
- Wheelbase: 120.8 in (3,068 mm)
- Length: 201.6 in (5,121 mm)
- Width: 76.4 in (1,941 mm)
- Height: 54.8 in (1,392 mm)

The Ford Interceptor was a concept car that debuted at the 2007 North American International Auto Show in Detroit, Michigan. The Interceptor was a retro-styled full-size sedan that reflected a modern interpretation of the classic sporty American muscle cars from the 1960s, like the Ford Galaxie. Ford officially introduced the Interceptor concept in a company press release dated 31 December 2006. Ford described the Interceptor design styling as being influenced, "...much like a Marine in dress uniform. He looks smart and elegant but you can see the raw power that lies beneath."

Ford currently has no production plans for such a full-size rear-wheel drive sedan, and almost all of Ford's sedans have been discontinued as of 2022, making the Interceptor's production extremely unlikely. Some of the Interceptor's design cues later appeared in the sixth-generation Ford Taurus.

== Engine ==
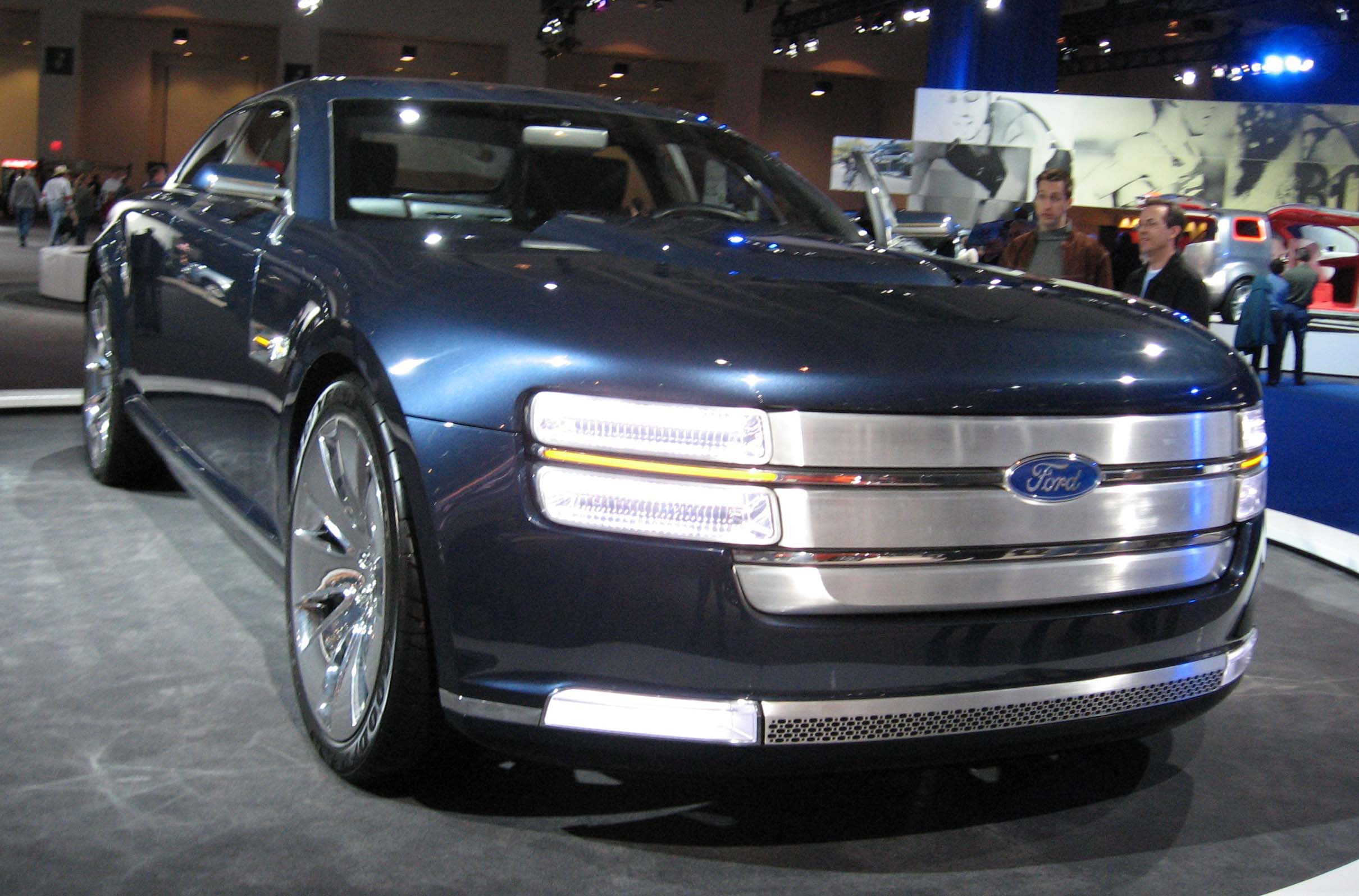
Front view

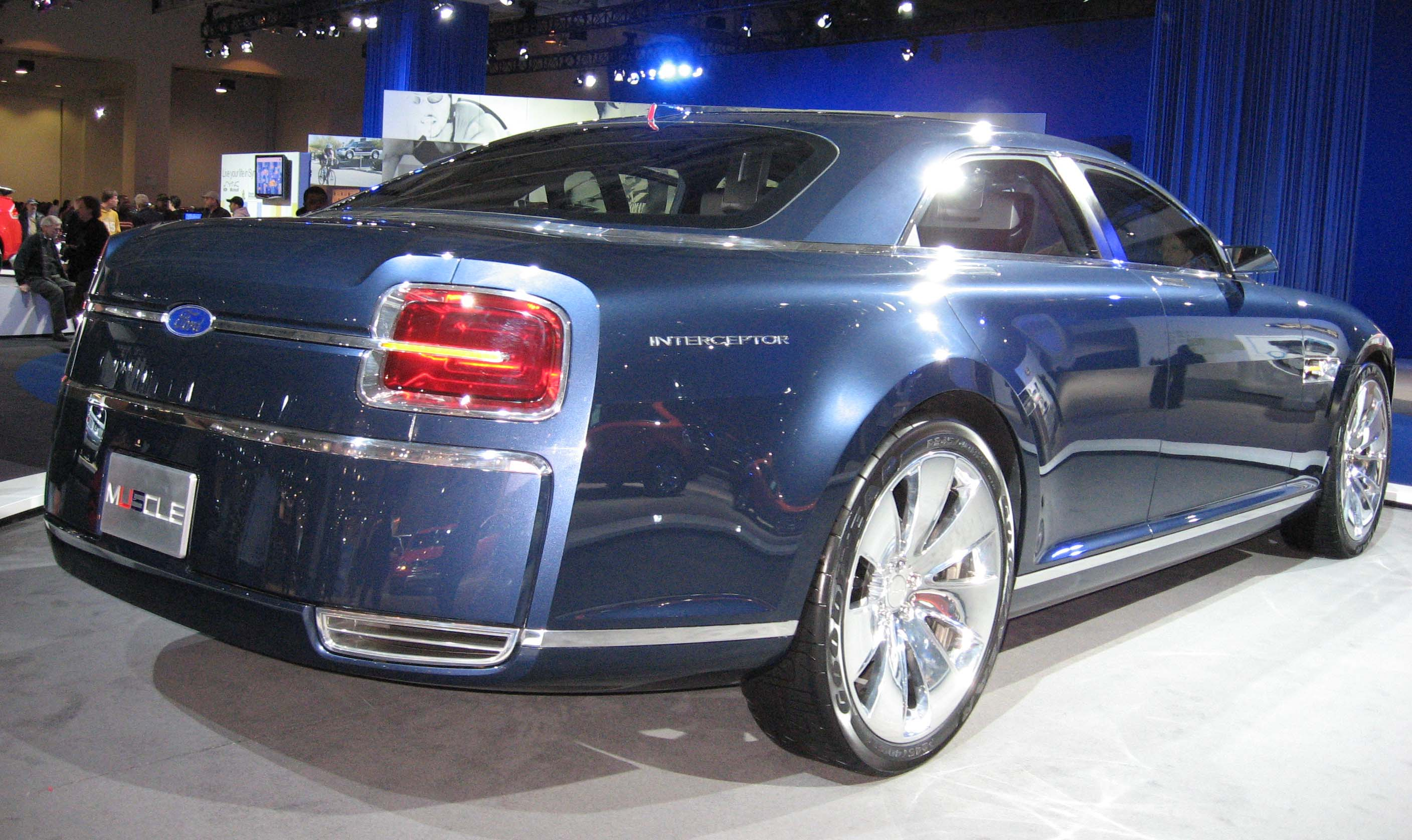
Rear view

The Interceptor Concept used a Ford Racing 5.0-liter Cammer engine which produced 600 hp (447 kW), with the capability of running on E85 ethanol. It included a manual six-speed transmission. The 5.0-liter Cammer engine was an upgraded variant of the 4.6-liter modular engine that powered the Mustang GT until 2011.

== Exterior ==
The car included a powered clamshell “shaker” hood, which covered the engine. The fullsize sedan was based on a stretched version of the rear wheel drive Mustang's Ford D2C platform, featuring a solid rear axle. The body was proportioned with short front overhang and a long rear overhang, and featured a low roofline and a high beltline, when compared to other Ford sedans like the Ford Taurus, with a wedged profile. The Interceptor Concept continued with the current Ford horizontal three-bar grille design introduced on the Ford Fusion and Ford Edge. The hood was high up, and flat with a raised rear-middle section. The squircle-shaped rear headlights on the Interceptor later influenced those on the Ford Taurus.

== Interior ==
The Interceptor incorporated a four-point "belt and suspenders" harness seatbelt design in the front and rear seats, with inflatable safety belts for rear seat passengers. The four-point belt represented a possible next-generation safety belt system that was designed to be more comfortable and easier to use than traditional three-point belts. The dash, headliner, steering wheel, and four low-back bucket seats are wrapped in leather. There were retractable headrests that deployed from the roof, adjusting fore and aft as well as up and down for each occupant. The audio control panel and climate controls were stowable, and there was a gated six-speed shifter in the center dash.

== Specifications ==
- Powertrain: 5.0-liter Cammer V-8 / 400 hp (300 kW) / flexible fuel
- Transmission: Manual six-speed gearbox
- Chassis Dimensions:
  - Overall length: 201.6 in (5,121 mm).
  - Wheelbase: 120.8 in (3,068 mm).
  - Overall width: 76.4 in (1,941 mm).
  - Overall height at curb: 54.8 in (1,392 mm).
  - Front track width: 66.5 in (1,689 mm).
  - Rear track width: 67.8 in (1,722 mm).
- Suspension
  - Front: Double wishbone independent
  - Rear: 3-Link design with Panhard rod
- Interior
  - Front Headroom: 37.5 in (952 mm).
  - Rear Headroom: 35.9 in (912 mm).
  - Front Legroom: 42.3 in (1,074 mm).
  - Rear Legroom: 35.6 in (904 mm).

== See also ==
- Ford Crown Victoria/Police Interceptor
- Ford D2C platform
