= Lincoln MKR =

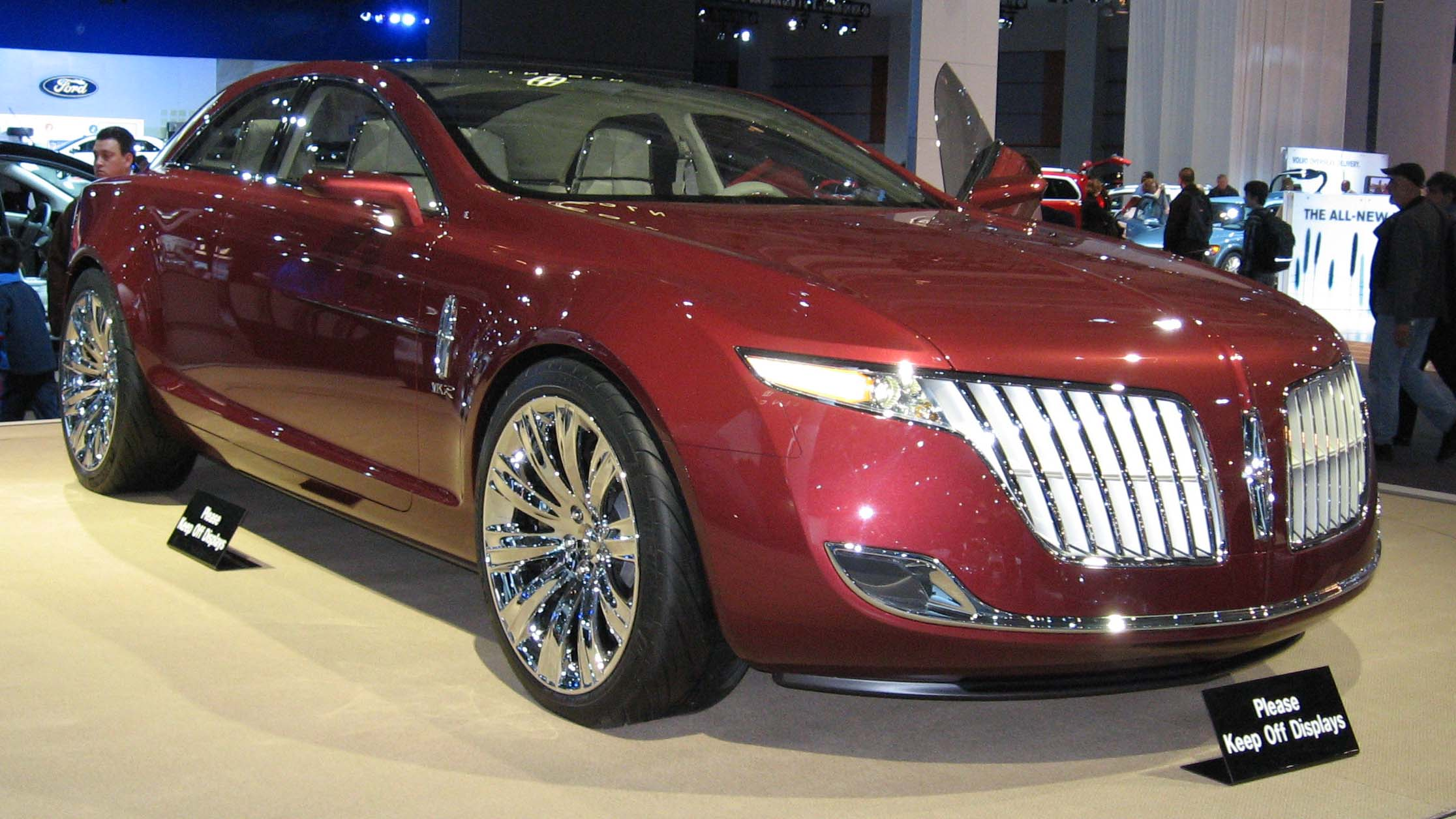

Overview
- Manufacturer: Lincoln (Ford)
- Production: 2007 (Concept car)
- Designer: J Mays; Peter Horbury; Gordon Platto

Body and chassis
- Class: Concept mid-size luxury car
- Body style: 4-door fastback sedan
- Layout: Front-engine, rear-wheel-drive
- Platform: Ford D2C platform
- Related: Ford Mustang; Ford Interceptor

Powertrain
- Engine: 3.5L TwinForce/EcoBoost V6
- Transmission: 6-speed automatic

Dimensions
- Wheelbase: 112.9 in (2,868 mm)
- Length: 195.7 in (4,971 mm)
- Width: 75.4 in (1,915 mm)
- Height: 52.7 in (1,339 mm)

Chronology
- Predecessor: Lincoln Navicross

The Lincoln MKR is a 4-door fastback sedan concept car, introduced during the 2007 North American International Auto Show by Lincoln. Its chassis was based on the Ford D2C platform as used in the Ford Mustang. The MKR signaled the next-generation of premium Lincoln vehicles, introducing the new TwinForce engine family and a restyled "bow wave" waterfall grille. The concept car was first unveiled to the media and the public in a press release on January 1, 2007.

== Concept ==
The Lincoln MKR concept featured an independent rear suspension, with MacPherson struts up front. The engine selected for the MKR concept introduced the new generation of Ford twin-turbocharged engines. The prototype TwinForce 3.5L twin-turbo, direct-injection gasoline V6 was also capable of running on E85 ethanol, producing up to 415-hp, and 400 pound force-feet (540 N⋅m) of torque.

The interior design included environmentally-friendly and renewable materials, such as cashmere leather, oak instrument panel engineered from recycled wood, mohair carpet, and seat cushion foam made from soy. The concept car also featured the THX II-certified car audio system.

The MKR concept was introduced along with what became Lincoln's flagship sedan, the Lincoln MKS. The MKR represented a full expression of Lincoln's future design strategy, which included seven primary design features:

- Clean and uncluttered body surfaces
- High beltlines
- Rear suicide doors are easy for passengers to access
- Chamfered surfaces which run parallel to the beltline
- Twin-port “bow-wave” double-wing front grille - inspired by the 1941 Lincoln Continental Cabriolet
- Thin horizontal headlights, and thin LED tailamps that run the width of the vehicle
- Thick C-pillar that smoothly transitions into the cantilevered roof
- Pronounced cantrail / roofrails

Special Projects Inc., located in Plymouth, Michigan, was hired to be responsible for the building of the MKR. Special Projects has built many other concept vehicles for Ford including the Ford 427, Ford Super Chief, Ford Flex, and Lincoln Blackwood.

== Production intent ==
The Lincoln MKR did not enter production, but many of the concept's design themes and features were adopted for the production Lincoln MKS, MKZ, MKX, and MKT vehicles, starting with the 2009 model year MKS, 2010 for the MKZ and MKT, and 2011 for the MKX. The Lincoln C concept also shared design themes with the MKR, in a smaller compact platform. If the MKR had ever been approved, as an all new vehicle it would have likely been scheduled to launch around the 2011 time frame, most likely having been assembled at Flat Rock Assembly Plant in Flat Rock, Michigan alongside the Mustang, with which it would have shared a platform.

== Specifications ==
- Powertrain: 3.5-liter V-6 TwinForce engine - 415 hp (309 kW) / 400 lb⋅ft (542 N⋅m)
- Chassis Dimensions:
  - Overall length: 195.7 in (4,971 mm).
  - Wheelbase: 112.9 in (2,868 mm).
  - Overall width: 75.4 in (1,915 mm).
  - Overall height at curb: 52.7 in (1,339 mm).
  - Front track width: 63.7 in (1,618 mm).
  - Rear track width: 63.8 in (1,621 mm).
- Brakes: Brembo power 4-wheel disc with ABS and traction control system
- Front Suspension: MacPherson struts with rear-facing L-shaped lower control arms and stabilizer bar
- Rear Suspension: Independent rear suspension
- Interior:
  - Front headroom: 37.8 in (960 mm).
  - Rear headroom: 36.9 in (937 mm).
  - Front legroom: 42.7 in (1,085 mm).
  - Rear legroom: 33.7 in (856 mm).
- Luggage capacity: 13.0 cu ft (370 L)
