= D2C =

D2C can mean:

- Direct-to-consumer, as in D2C advertising
- Direct-to-cellular, direct satellite communication to mobile phones
- Daigou-to-consumer, as in daigou buying products and goods overseas on behalf of people living in China
- D2C Games, Inc., a digital games company
- Ford D2C platform
