= Ford Thunderbird (eleventh generation) =

American sports car

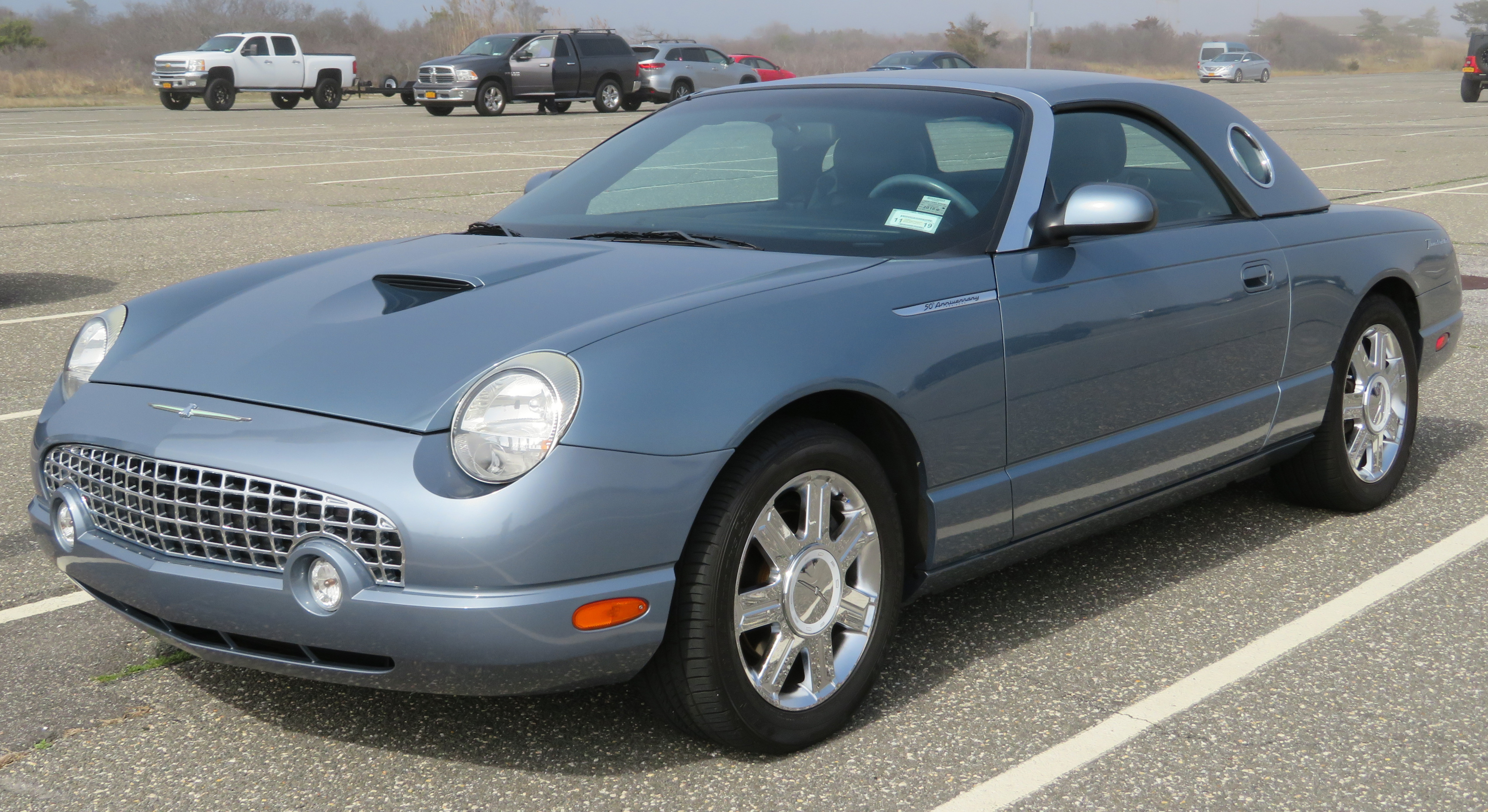

Overview
- Manufacturer: Ford Motor Company
- Model code: M205
- Production: June 2001 – July 2005
- Model years: 2002–2005
- Assembly: United States: Wixom, Michigan (Wixom Assembly)
- Designer: Jack Telnack (1997)

Body and chassis
- Class: Personal luxury car
- Body style: 2-door convertible
- Layout: Front-engine, rear-wheel drive
- Platform: Ford DEW98

Powertrain
- Engine: 3.9 L Jaguar AJ35 V8
- Transmission: 5-speed Ford Bordeaux 5R44E automatic

Dimensions
- Wheelbase: 107.1 in (2,720 mm)
- Length: 186.3 in (4,732 mm)
- Width: 72 in (1,829 mm)
- Height: 52.1 in (1,323 mm)
- Curb weight: 3,775 lb (1,712 kg)

Chronology
- Predecessor: Ford Thunderbird (tenth generation)

The eleventh generation Ford Thunderbird is a two-door, two passenger, front-engine rear-drive, personal luxury convertible manufactured and marketed for model years 2002-2005 by Ford Motor Company with a design strongly recalling the first generation Thunderbird — and prioritizing year-round touring comfort over sportiness.

Presented by Ford at the 1999 North American International Auto Show, the two-seater was designed under the direction of Jack Telnack and manufactured at Ford's Wixom Assembly Plant in a convertible body style with an optional manually removable hardtop — using Ford's DEW platform and Jaguar's 3.9 L AJ35 V8 engine. Following a hiatus in its model continuity after the 1989-1997 Thunderbird, production of the eleventh generation commenced in June 2001, reaching 68,098 before its discontinuation in July 2005.

The Thunderbird received the Motor Trend Car of the Year award in 2002, and has been featured in several films, including Die Another Day, Thunderbirds, and The Sopranos.

== Background and development ==
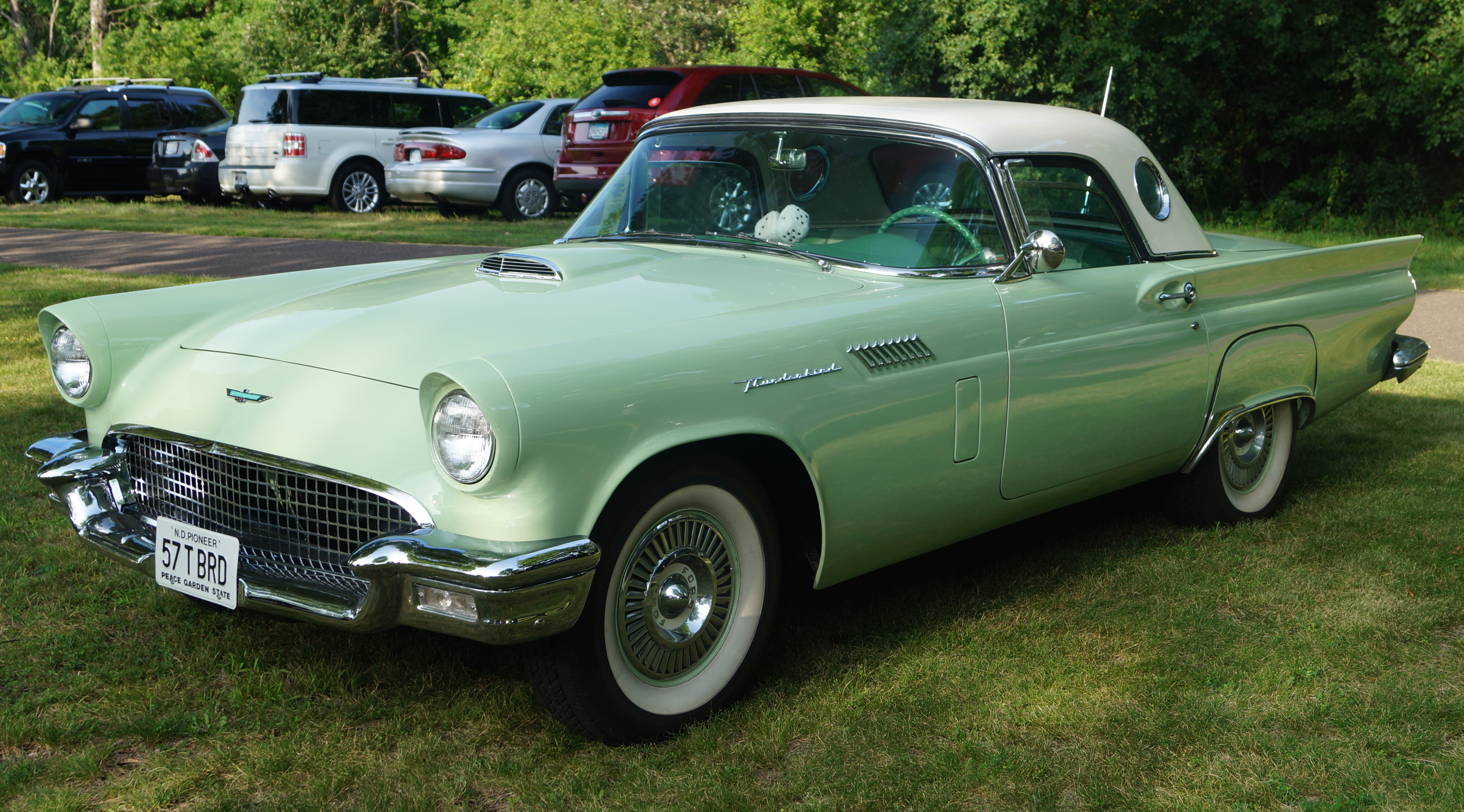
The original Thunderbird

The original Ford Thunderbird debuted in October 1954. Originally designed to compete with British, Italian, and German sports cars and the Chevrolet Corvette, it was the first time the Ford division sold two distinct model lines simultaneously. The Thunderbird incorporated various advanced technologies for its era, including power seats and a padded dashboard. Ten consecutive generations of the car were produced; the tenth generation was discontinued in 1997. The introduction of the Volkswagen New Beetle in 1997 sparked a renaissance of retro-styling in American automakers.

Jack Telnack, the lead design director of the Ford Thunderbird project, initiated a competition among design studios in Italy, England, Germany, California, and Dearborn; the latter studio ultimately prevailed. On Telnack's retirement, his successor, J Mays, then handled the minor design elements, including trims, fabrics, interior, and colors. The Thunderbird had the longest development process of any car Telnack worked on. Ford unveiled the car as a concept vehicle at the 1999 edition of the North American International Auto Show, and revealed the car's final design at the same motor show two years later. Official manufacture of the Thunderbird began in June 2001, at the assembly plant in Wixom, Michigan. It indirectly replaces the tenth generation of the Thunderbird, discontinued in 1997.

== Design ==
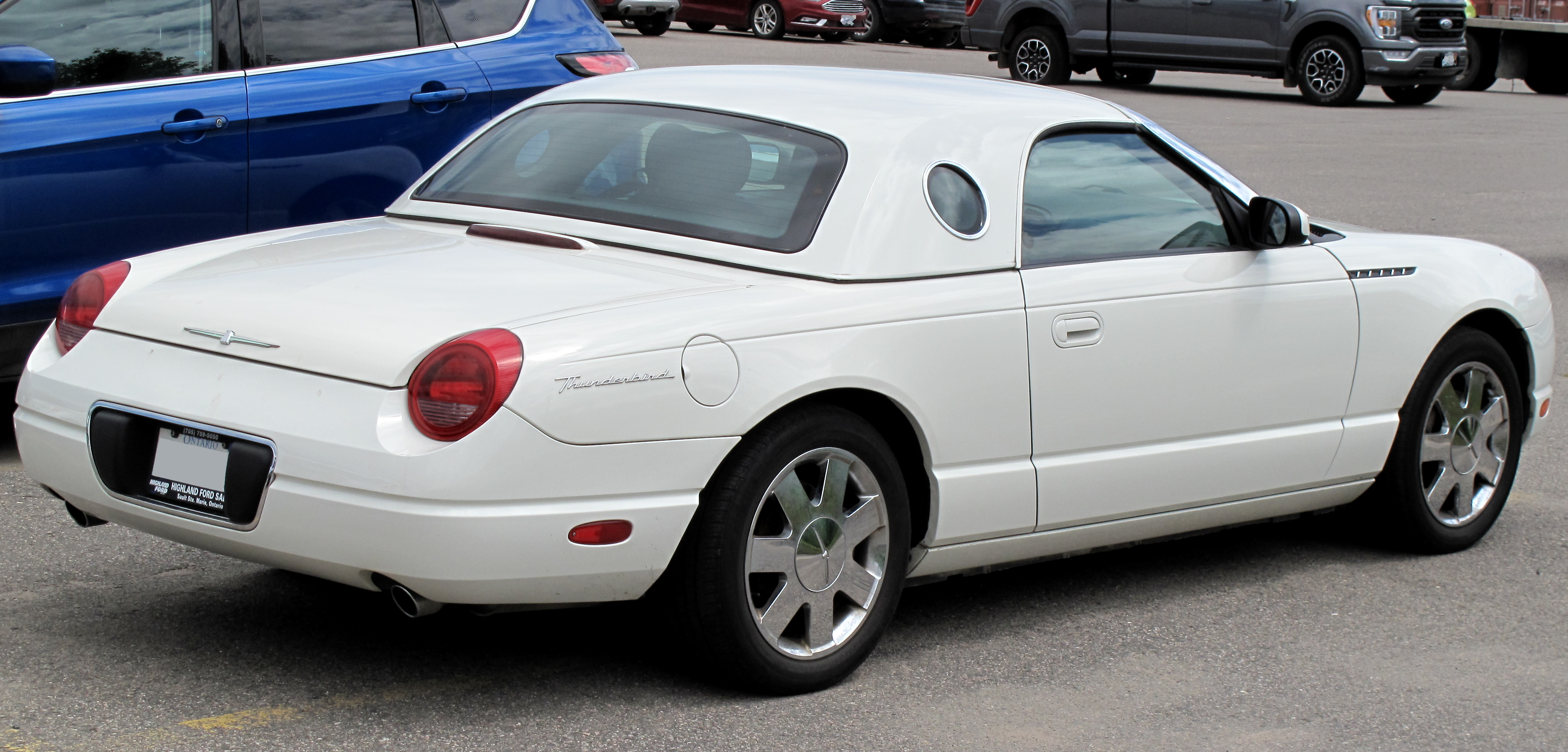
Rear view

The Thunderbird uses Ford's DEW platform, shared with the Jaguar S-Type and the Lincoln LS.

It is a two-door, two passenger personal luxury convertible with two doors accommodating two passengers, with an optional removable hardtop. The designers aimed for a simple design, returning to elements like fluted doors, wing-shaped door panels, a two-tone dashboard and metal turquoise accents. Compared to the LS and the S-Type, the Thunderbird features a shorter wheelbase and overall length. The car has seventeen-inch cast aluminum wheels and tires sized P235/50VR-17. It has a rear-wheel drive layout and a front-engine placement, and a computer-engineered, fully independent suspension system incorporating lightweight materials to reduce weight and improve response.

The Thunderbird features Jaguar's 3.9-liter AJ30 V8 engine, which generates a power output of 188 kilowatts (252 hp) and 362 newton-meters (267 lb⋅ft), providing a 0 to 97 km/h (60 mph) acceleration of 7.25 seconds. Power is transmitted through a five-speed automatic transmission. In 2003, the Thunderbird received minor updates, including an increase in engine output to 210 kilowatts (280 hp) and 388 newton-meters (286 lb⋅ft). The dashboard was revised, featuring more traditional analog gauges for better visibility during daylight driving. Additionally, a "Select Shift" version of the five-speed transmission was introduced as an option.

=== Trim Levels ===
The eleventh-generation Thunderbird was available in two trim levels: Deluxe and Premium. Standard equipment included perforated leather-trimmed seating surfaces, dual power-adjustable bucket seats, a leather-wrapped steering wheel, cruise control, dual-zone automatic climate control system with air conditioning, keyless entry, security alarm system, 17-inch tires and aluminum-alloy wheels, power-retractable cloth convertible roof (top), an AM/FM stereo radio with an in-dash 6-disc CD changer and an Audiophile sound system with dual amplifiers for the rear speakers, a driver message center, the HomeLink garage door opener system, a glass rear window with a defroster, and automatic delay on/off front headlamps. Notably, Deluxe trim did not include heated seats. The Premium trim received chrome-clad aluminum-alloy wheels, dual heated seats and a 90-lb. manually removable hardtop roof in either matching or contrasting color and two porthole windows, the latter recalling the earliest Thunderbirds.

Depending on the exterior color, Premium trim models offered an optional full or partial interior color packages. A Black Appearance Package was available with any exterior color and included high-gloss black accents to the leather-wrapped steering wheel and automatic transmission gear selector. A Parchment package included a Parchment cloth soft top (roof), color-keyed accents on the steering wheel and gear selector lever, and seat centers. Other options included the color of the removable hardtop roof, as well as a choice of various 17-inch aluminum-alloy wheels.

== Special editions ==
2002 Neiman Marcus Edition: In 2000, Ford introduced the Neiman Marcus edition in the company's Christmas catalog. With a production of 200 and MSRP of US$41,995, the edition featured two-tone black exterior paint color with silver hard top roof; logo etched into the circular hardtop glazing; scooped hood; twenty-one spoke chrome aluminum-alloy wheels; silver-accented steering wheel and transmission gear selector lever; aluminum dash inserts; perforated black leather-trimmed interior with silver wing-embroidered seat inserts; 'Neiman Marcus' embroidered floor mats and an available 1/18-scale die cast model.

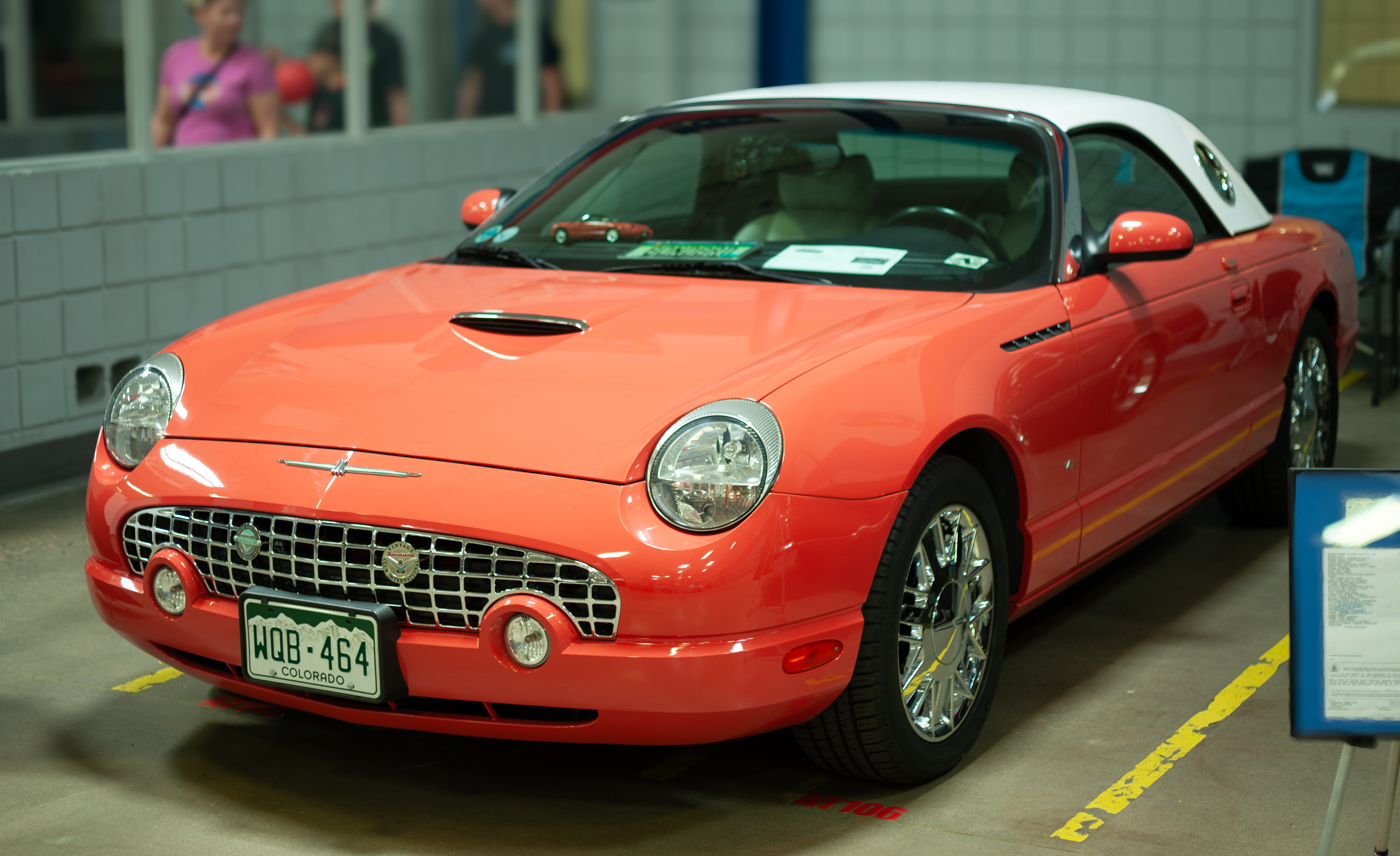
Thunderbird James Bond 007 Edition

2003 James Bond 007 Edition: Ford introduced the James Bond Edition as a co-branding promotion for the James Bond Die Another Day movie. With a production of 700, the edition featured coral paint with a white hardtop; twenty-one spoke chrome aluminum-alloy wheels, white perforated leather-trimmed interior, engine-turned interior trim panels with "007" emblem, engine horsepower increased from 250 to 280, five-speed automatic transmission with manual gear selection; MSRP of US$43,995, and an available die cast scale model. Starting with Goldfinger in 1964 through Diamonds Are Forever, Ford had a product placement arrangement with the film's producer to exclusively use Ford products in the movies, a tradition that was restored with this movie.

2004 Pacific Coast Roadster Edition: The Pacific Coast Roadster edition, with 1,000 examples produced, featured monterey mist green paint with an ash metallic hard top roof and light ash soft top roof, paired with light ash and dark ash interior and suede trimmed seating, aluminum-alloy wheels, color-keyed interior accents, patterned dash trim, and a numbered dashboard plaque.

2005 50th Anniversary Cashmere Special Edition: In 2005, Ford celebrated the 50th anniversary of the Ford Thunderbird. All 2005 Thunderbirds received a "50th Anniversary" badge. The Cashmere edition, with a production run of 1,500, featured a commemorative dashboard plaque, cashmere exterior paint and medium gray soft top convertible roof; hard top; 50th Anniversary front fender emblems; teal-accented third rear brake lamp with illuminated "Thunderbird" script; two-tone gray and dark gray interior with Cashmere perforated leather-trimmed seating; color-keyed instrument cluster with turquoise gauge needles and "Ford Thunderbird" door sill plates round.

== Safety ==
NHTSA crash test ratings (2002):

- Frontal Crash Test – Driver:
- Frontal Crash Test – Passenger:
- Side Impact Rating – Driver:
- Rollover Rating:

== Reception and legacy ==
Forbes magazine writer Jerry Flint attributed the Thunderbird's demise to a lack of proper sales and marketing, writing: "Ford dealers have been successful selling $35,000-45,000 trucks, but have little experience selling automobiles in the near-luxury price range. If there was a marketing effort by Ford Motor, I wasn't aware of it. Naturally, sales didn't meet expectations."

Noted automotive journalist Doug DeMuro criticized the price of the Thunderbird and the similarity its interior had to the Lincoln LS. With respect to the interior, he noted its hard plastic switchgear shared with other models — while admiring the retro styling of the door panels. He also criticized the engine, saying it wasn't sporty. In his opinion, Ford made the 11th generation for people who were nostalgic for the first generations, not for a discerning buyer of a modern sports or luxury car, resulting in its poor sales.

Year	Production
2002	31,368
2003	14,678
2004	12,757
2005	9,295
Total	68,098

== Film, television, and media ==
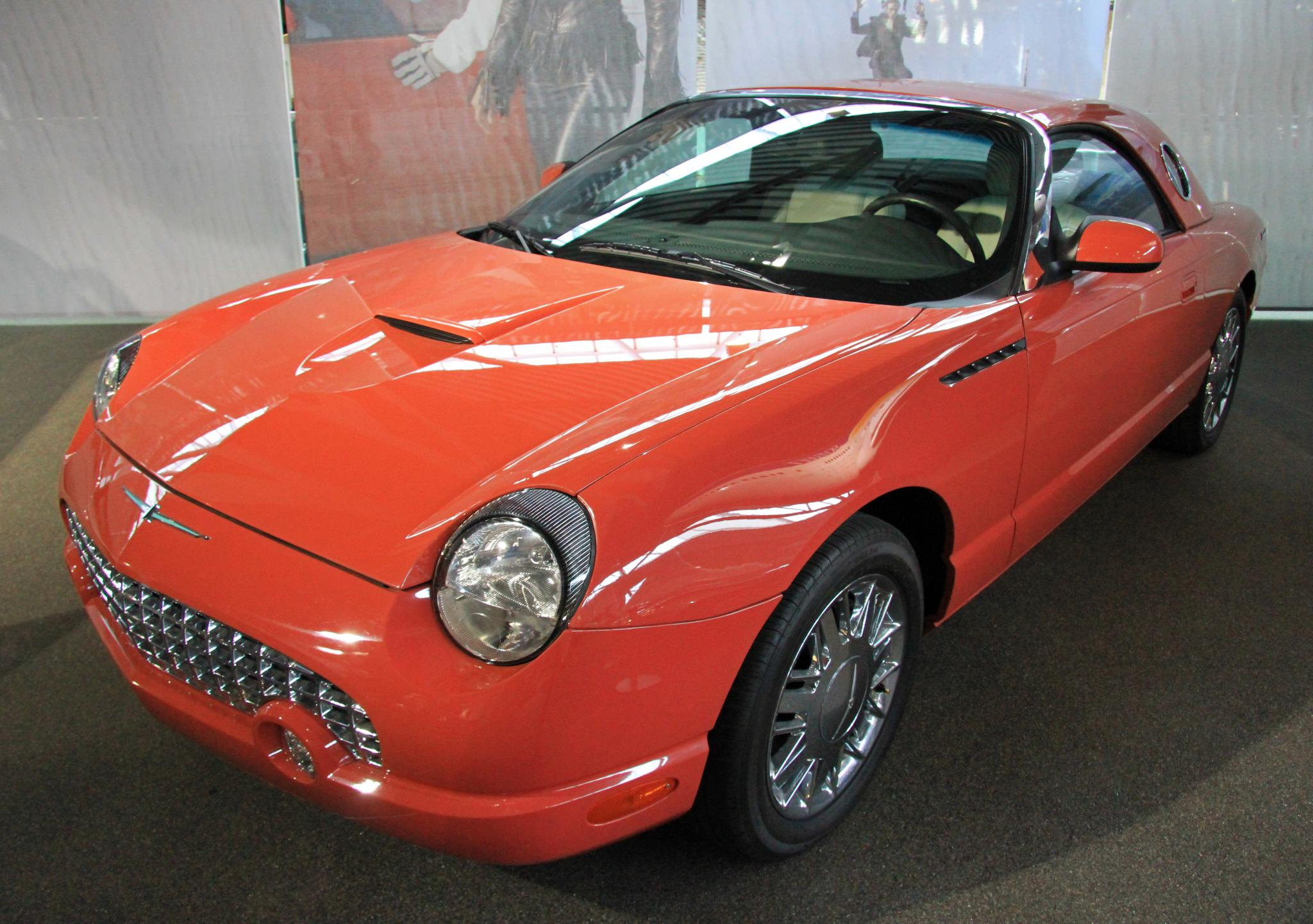
Ford Thunderbird featured in Die Another Day

The 2003 Thunderbird was featured in the James Bond movie Die Another Day, driven by Halle Berry's character. In addition, a similar Thunderbird was featured in The Cat in the Hat.

The 2004 live-action film Thunderbirds featured a heavily modified 11th generation Ford Thunderbird, a fully functional full-sized six-wheeled prototype called FAB 1.

Adriana La Cerva, girlfriend and later fiancé to Christopher Moltisanti in the HBO series The Sopranos, drove a 2002 Ford Thunderbird in seasons 4 and 5.

Shelby Cummings, a central antagonist of the 2004 Hilary Duff movie A Cinderella Story drove a white 2002 Ford Thunderbird.

In the 2003 action film Cradle 2 The Grave, Jet Li's character, Taiwan intelligence agent Duncan Su, is introduced driving an all-black 02 Thunderbird from his arrival at San Francisco International Airport and into the city.

It also appears in Downtown Run, Ford Racing 2, Ford Racing 3, Enthusia Professional Racing, Ford vs. Chevy, and Ford Street Racing.
