= Premier Automotive Group =

Organizational division within the Ford Motor Company

Coordinates: 33.6573338°N 117.7485857°W

- Type: Division
- Industry: Automotive
- Founded: 1998; 28 years ago
- Defunct: August 1, 2011; 15 years ago
- Headquarters: Irvine, California, United States
- Products: Automobiles
- Parent: Ford Motor Company
- Subsidiaries: Aston Martin; Jaguar Cars; Land Rover; Lincoln Motor Company; Volvo Cars

The Premier Automotive Group (PAG) was an organizational division within the Ford Motor Company formed in 1998 to oversee the business operations of Ford's luxury vehicle brands. The PAG was gradually dismantled from 2006 to 2011 with the divestiture of its constituent brands.

== History ==
The Premier Automotive Group was formed in 1998 under then-CEO Jacques Nasser and grew to include the Lincoln, Aston Martin, Jaguar, Land Rover and Volvo brands. Forbes estimated that, by 2004, Ford had spent $17 billion building on acquisitions to form PAG.

In 2002, Lincoln returned to Ford's direct control. Lincoln's headquarters had been merged into PAG's North American office, where it was run by a German executive based in London, England.

The four other marques in the Premier Automotive Group (Aston Martin, Jaguar, Land Rover, and Volvo) operated as distinct companies with separate markets and dealer networks, which limited potential synergies within the division. Ford encouraged the brands to share parts and engineering to reduce costs, but this sometimes resulted in vehicles that were criticized for resembling mass-market Ford models. The Jaguar X-Type, for example, shared its platform with the Ford Mondeo and was seen as insufficiently distinct. Volvo, which had been successful in the United States as an independent entry-level luxury brand, lost market share during its time in PAG to German manufacturers such as BMW and Mercedes-Benz, which had expanded their lower-priced luxury offerings.

When Alan Mulally became president and CEO in September 2006, he oversaw Ford's dismantling of the Premier Automotive Group. In 2007, Ford sold 92% of Aston Martin to a consortium of investors headed by David Richards. In September 2006, the rights to use the defunct Rover brand name had been secured from BMW by Ford to protect the Land Rover brand. In March 2008, Ford sold Jaguar and Land Rover to Indian carmaker Tata Motors. In 2010, Ford sold the Swedish brand Volvo Cars, the last of the PAG brands, to the parent of Chinese carmaker Geely for $1.8 billion.

== Management ==
- 1998–2002: Wolfgang Reitzle
- 2002–2005: Mark Fields
- 2005–2008: Lewis Booth

== Headquarters ==
The Premier Automotive Group headquarters were located at 1 Premier Place in Irvine, California. It is next door to the Mazda North American Operations office, and is now the main office for Taco Bell.

The Premier Automotive Group office in the United States was completed in 2001 at a cost of $68 million. It was the first Ford building and the first building in Orange County to qualify for Leadership in Energy and Environmental Design classification from the U.S. Green Building Council. When the headquarters first opened, some of its floors were each specifically dedicated to one of PAG's brands. The complex also included a separate 90,000-square-foot (8,400 m^{2}) product development centre. In late 2008, a deal was announced to lease the former PAG headquarters building in Irvine to the Taco Bell restaurant chain. Although Ford planned to leave a small product development staff on the property, this was widely seen as the end of the PAG story and an ironic comment on the expensive failure of Ford's luxury-car strategy. The New York Times asked dryly, "Will they install a drive-up window?"

== Members ==
=== Aston Martin ===
Aston Martin was a member of PAG. Ford acquired an interest in Aston Martin in 1987 and had full control from 1991. It was sold on 12 March 2007 for £479 million. However, Ford retained a £40 million (8%) stake in Aston Martin.

=== Lincoln ===
Ford's luxury car division, Lincoln, was part of the Premier Auto Group in the late 1990s, but was pulled out in 2002 as part of Ford's marketing strategy to separate its "import" marques from its domestic ones. During the creation of PAG, Lincoln's line-up received a complete overhaul, beginning with the 1998 redesign of the Lincoln Town Car. The same year also saw the introduction of the Lincoln Navigator SUV and in 2000 the Lincoln LS, which shared its engines and platform with the Jaguar S-Type, was introduced. All three cars were designed in Irvine, California and were, according to many critics, heavily influenced by Jaguar design themes. In both years 1998 and 2000 Lincoln was the best-selling luxury car brand in the US. After Cadillac surged in the market in 2002, however, Ford pulled Lincoln out of the PAG in what is according to Jerry Flint of Forbes magazine a strategy beyond comprehension.

=== Jaguar ===
Ford made an offer for Jaguar stock in 1989. It was placed in Premier Automotive Group when it was formed. After acquiring Land Rover, Ford marketed Jaguar and Land Rover together and sold them off in 2008.

=== Land Rover ===
Ford acquired Land Rover from BMW in 2000 after the break-up of the former Rover Group. On 18 September 2006, Ford announced the purchase of the rights to use the Rover name. BMW had licensed the Rover name to MG Rover Group from 2000 until 2005, when MG Rover collapsed after a failed merger with SAIC. As part of Ford's initial purchase of Land Rover, Ford had the first option to purchase the Rover name if MG Rover Group ceased trading. Ford did not plan to use the name in production, instead buying it merely to protect their use of the name Land Rover.

Ford sold Jaguar and Land Rover to Tata Motors in March 2008 for £1.15 billion. As part of Ford's sale of Jaguar and Land Rover to Tata Motors, the defunct Rover brand name was included, as well as the Daimler and Lanchester marques.

=== Volvo Cars ===
Ford acquired Volvo's automotive division in 1999, and Volvo's commercial vehicles division became a separate company — the two sharing symbols and trademarks.

With Volvo engineers, Ford was able to adapt Volvo's Haldex AWD to Ford models as well as adapt the Volvo P2 Platform to its D3 and D4 Platforms — used for the Ford Five Hundred, Taurus X, Flex and Explorer as well as the Lincoln MKS, MKT.

Volvo engineers incorporated numerous Volvo safety innovations in to these vehicles including a bolt-in hydroformed cross-car steel beam between the B-pillars directly below an identical reinforced roof crossbeam above the B-pillars, to channel impact forces around the passenger compartment. Ford marketed the system as its SPACE Architecture (Side Protection and Cabin Enhancement), what Volvo called its Side Impact Protection System (SIPS). Front frame rails were redesigned to better absorb impact forces, and Volvo also co-engineered collapsible steering columns and roof-mounted airbags.

Initially, Ford achieved only a tepid market with its D3 vehicles, though after the PAG group divested itself of Volvo, the Fifth Generation Explorer enjoyed broad market success.

Geely was reported to have approached Ford in mid-2008 about a possible takeover of Volvo Cars. On 28 October 2009, Ford named Geely the preferred buyer of Volvo Cars. On 23 December 2009, Ford confirmed that all substantive commercial terms for the sale to Geely had been settled. Geely signed a deal with Ford to acquire Volvo Cars for $1.8 billion on 28 March 2010 and closed the deal on 2 August 2010.
