= Ford DEW platform =

Automotive platform

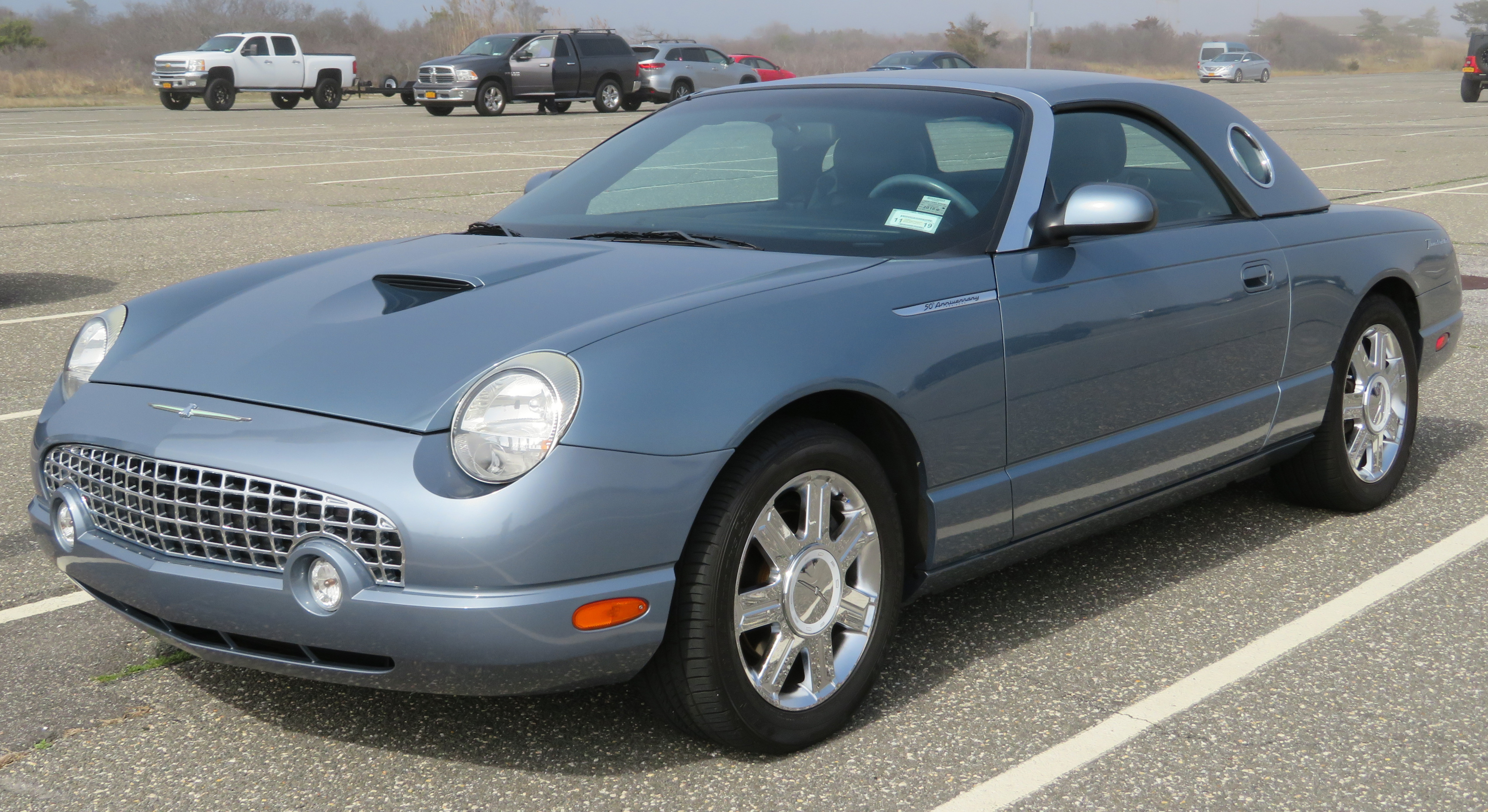
- 2005 Ford Thunderbird one of the vehicles based on the DEW platform

Overview
- Manufacturer: Ford; Tata Motors
- Also called: DEW98
- Production: 1999–2015
- Assembly: United States: Wixom, Michigan (Wixom Assembly); United Kingdom: Birmingham (Castle Bromwich Assembly)

Body and chassis
- Layout: FR layout
- Body styles: 4-door sedan 2-door convertible 5-door Wagon
- Vehicles: 1999–2008 Jaguar S-Type; 2000–2006 Lincoln LS; 2002–2005 Ford Thunderbird; 2008–2015 Jaguar XF
- Related: Ford D2C platform

Chronology
- Predecessor: Ford DE-1 platform

The Ford DEW platform (or DEW98) is Ford Motor Company's midsized rear-wheel drive automobile platform. The D/E nomenclature was meant to express an intermediate size between D- and E-class vehicles, while the W denoted a worldwide platform. The platform was developed by both Ford and Jaguar engineers, and debuted in the Lincoln LS sedan. Its de facto predecessor in Europe was the DE-1 platform which underpinned the 1985 Ford Scorpio, however this vehicle was cancelled in 1998 without a direct replacement as in the European market, buyers were increasingly turning away from executive class cars manufactured by mainstream manufacturers.

Ford's use of the platform ended in 2006, but Jaguar continued to use DEW98 after Jaguar was sold to Tata Motors in 2008, building the XF on it. Jaguar's use of the platform ended in 2015 with the introduction of the second-generation XF using the Jaguar Land Rover iQ[Al] (D7a) modular platform.

== Vehicles ==
This platform was used in these vehicles:

- 1999–2008 Jaguar S-Type
- 2000–2006 Lincoln LS
- 2002–2005 Ford Thunderbird
- 2008–2015 Jaguar XF

Cancelled vehicles that were to use this platform:

- 2004 Ford Fairlane
- 2004 Lincoln D310 - became the CD3-based Lincoln Zephyr
- 2005 Ford Mustang - used the D2C platform instead
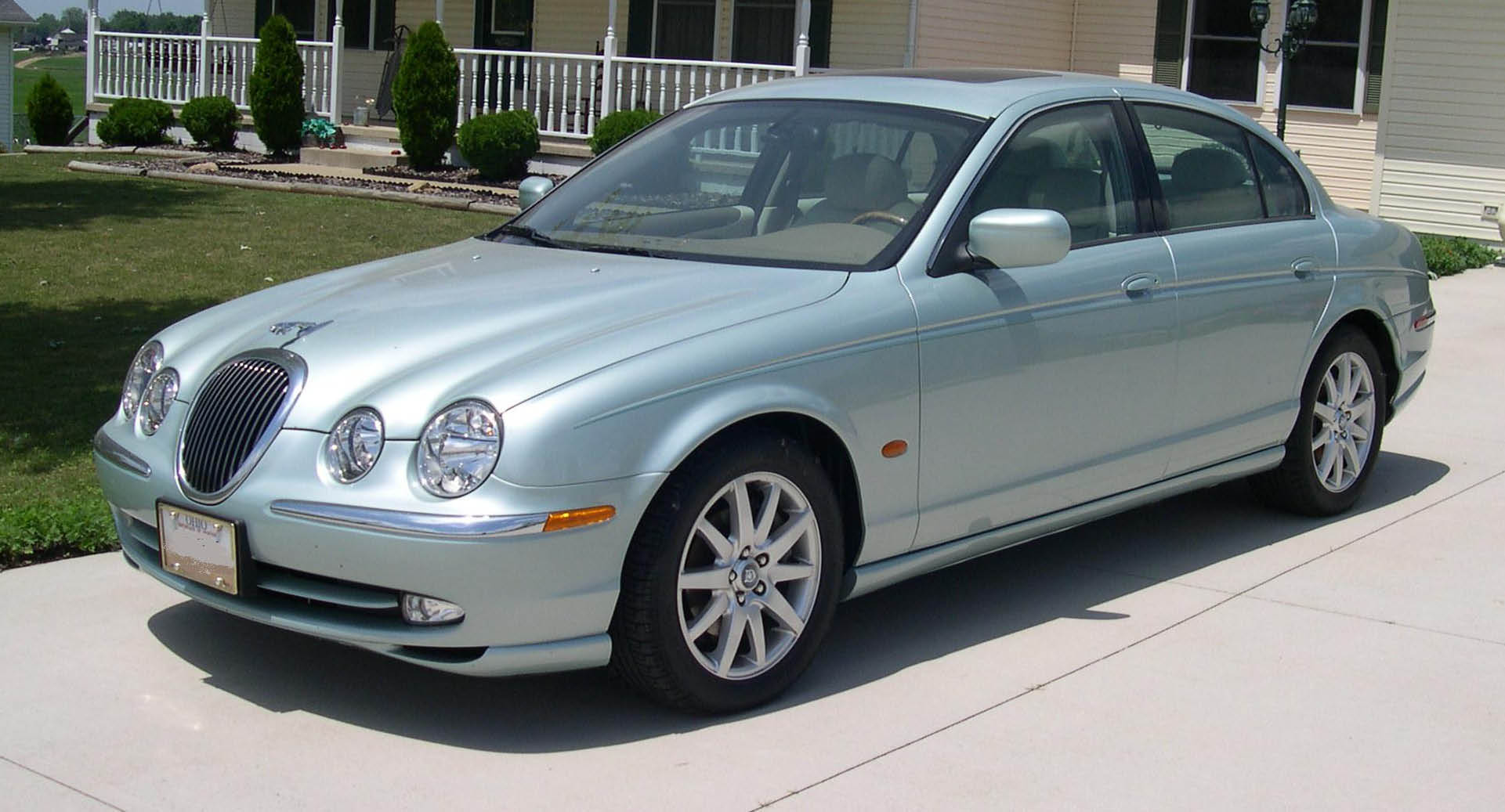
Jaguar S-Type

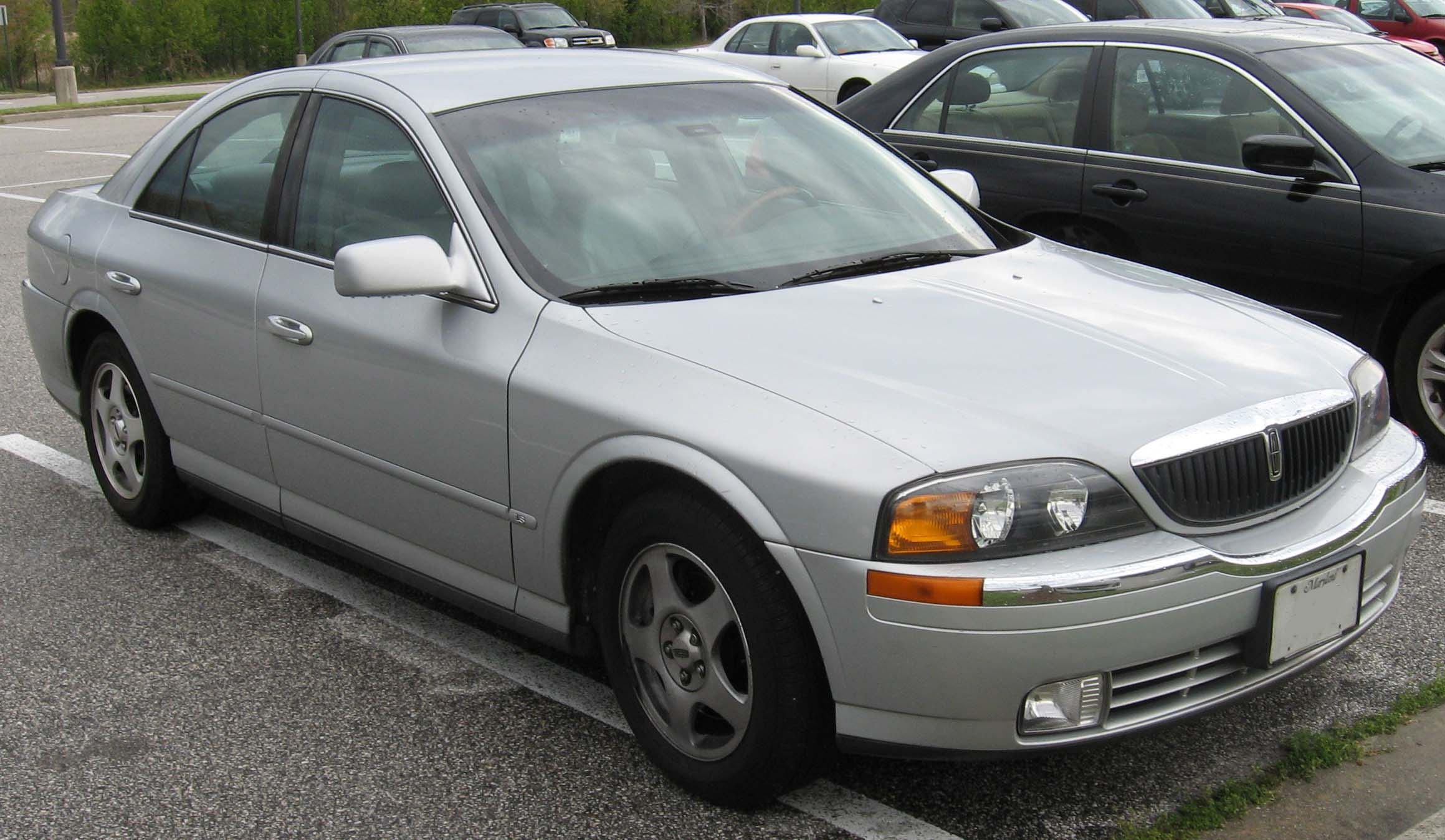
Lincoln LS

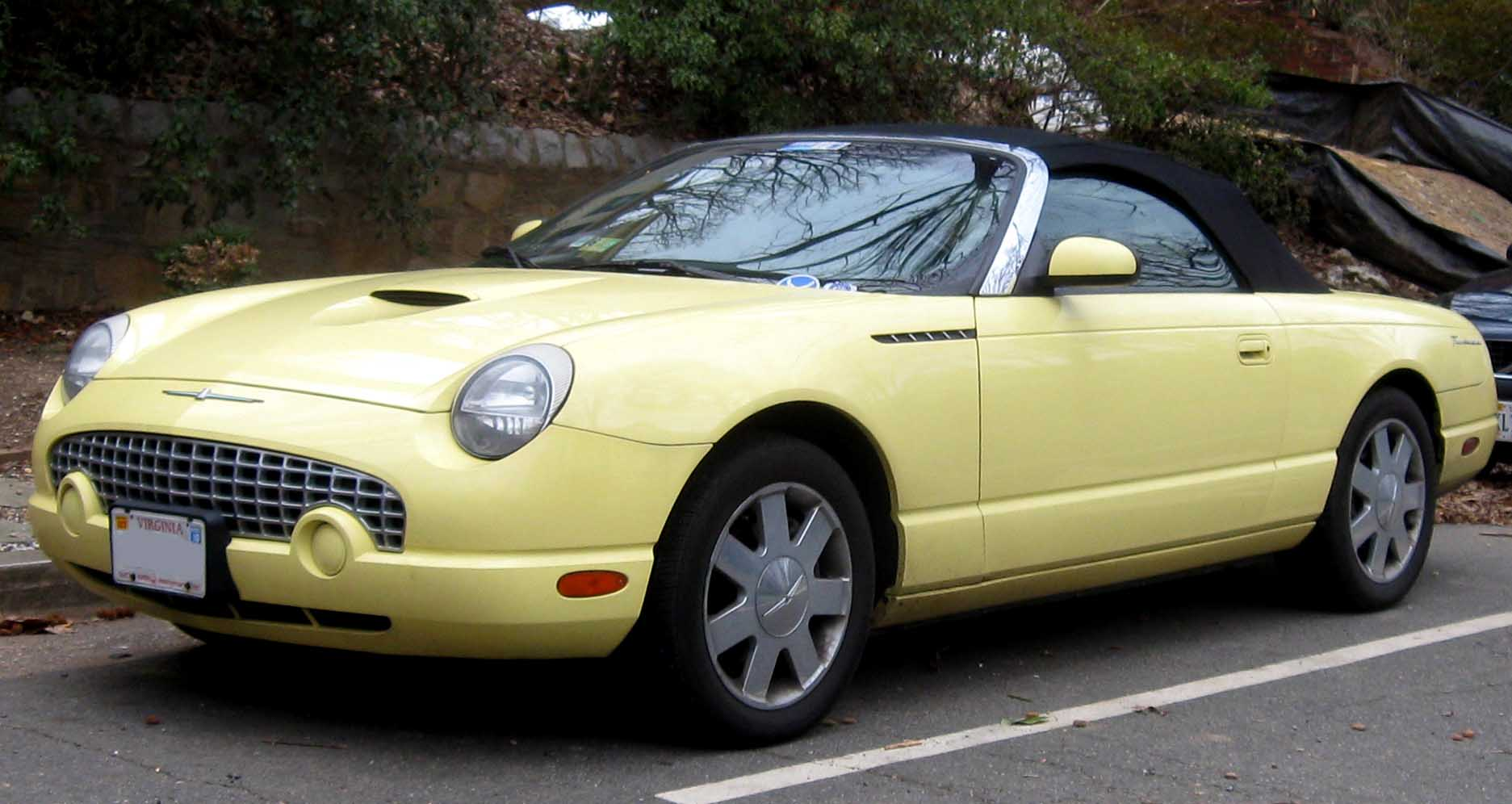
Ford Thunderbird

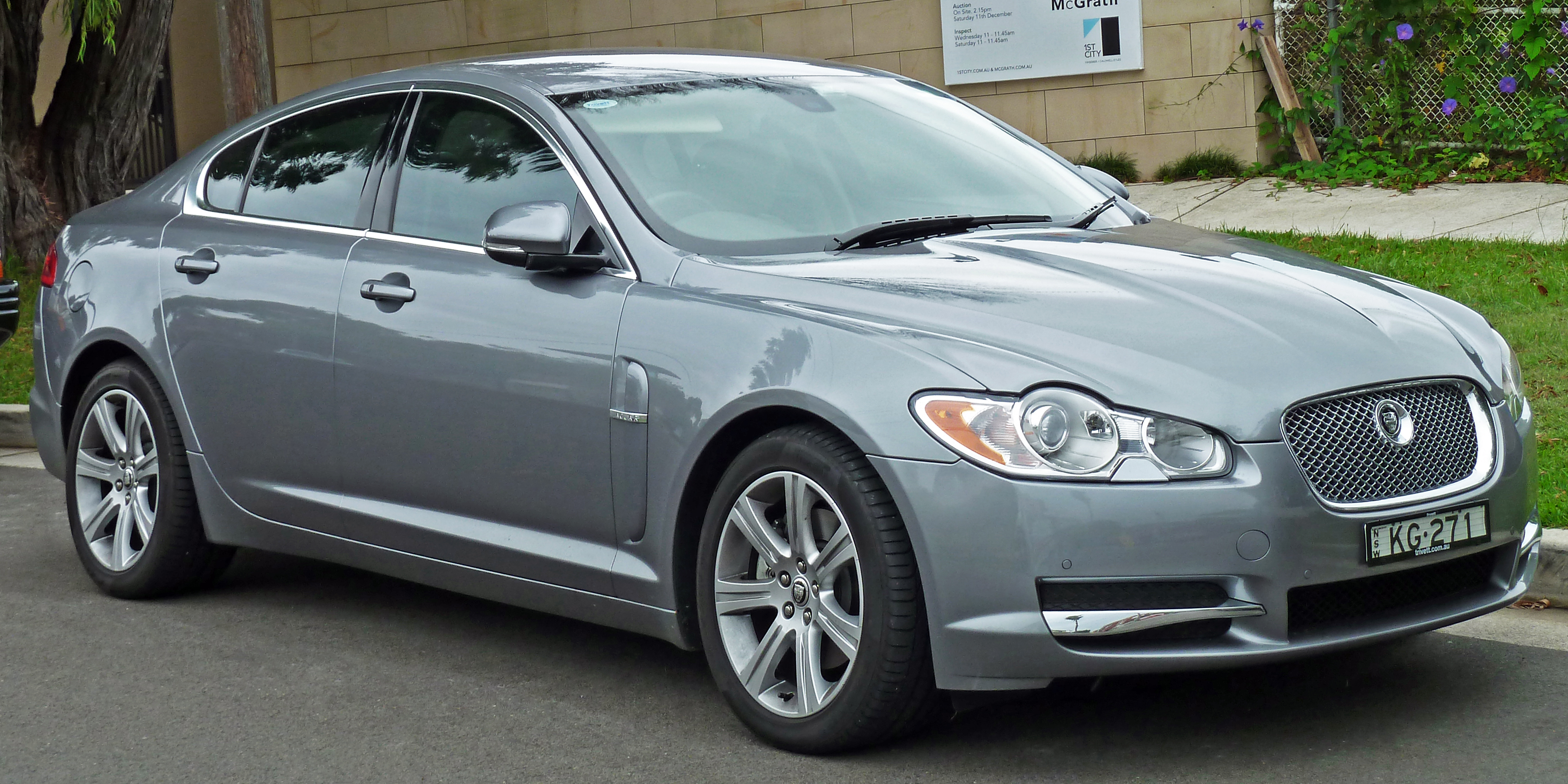
Jaguar XF
