= Car Design News =

Car Design News (CDN) (ISSN 1546-3117) is an online news and information service for the international automotive design community. CDN covers production and concept cars, the career moves of significant car designers, major international auto shows, design competitions and student exhibitions at the major transportation design colleges. It is based in the UK and published by Ultima Media, part of German publisher Süddeutscher Verlag.

CDN offers both free and paywall-protect content.

== History ==
Car Design News homepage

CDN was founded in November 1999 by Brett Patterson, an automotive designer working at the time for General Motors on assignment in Detroit. In 2004, Patterson relocated to London, UK, taking on fellow car designers Nick Hull and Sam Livingstone as partners.

Eric Gallina came on board in 2005 and helped grow the site's editorial content as well as its reach. He became Editor just before the company was acquired by Ultima Media Ltd in 2008. Gallina continued to work under new ownership, running the website and commissioning contributors from 2008 through 2012.The current Car Design News team consists of editor-in-chief James McLachlan, deputy editor Freddie Holmes and assistant editor Lucy Abbott.

== Portfolio ==
The Car Design News portfolio of activities currently includes Car Design of the Year, Car Design Night, Car Design Awards China, Car Design News Webinars, Interior Motives (a print magazine illustrating in detail the design development of selected car interiors), Interior Motives conference, and the Interior Motives Student Design Awards.

== See also ==
- The Truth About Cars
