= Ford D2C platform =

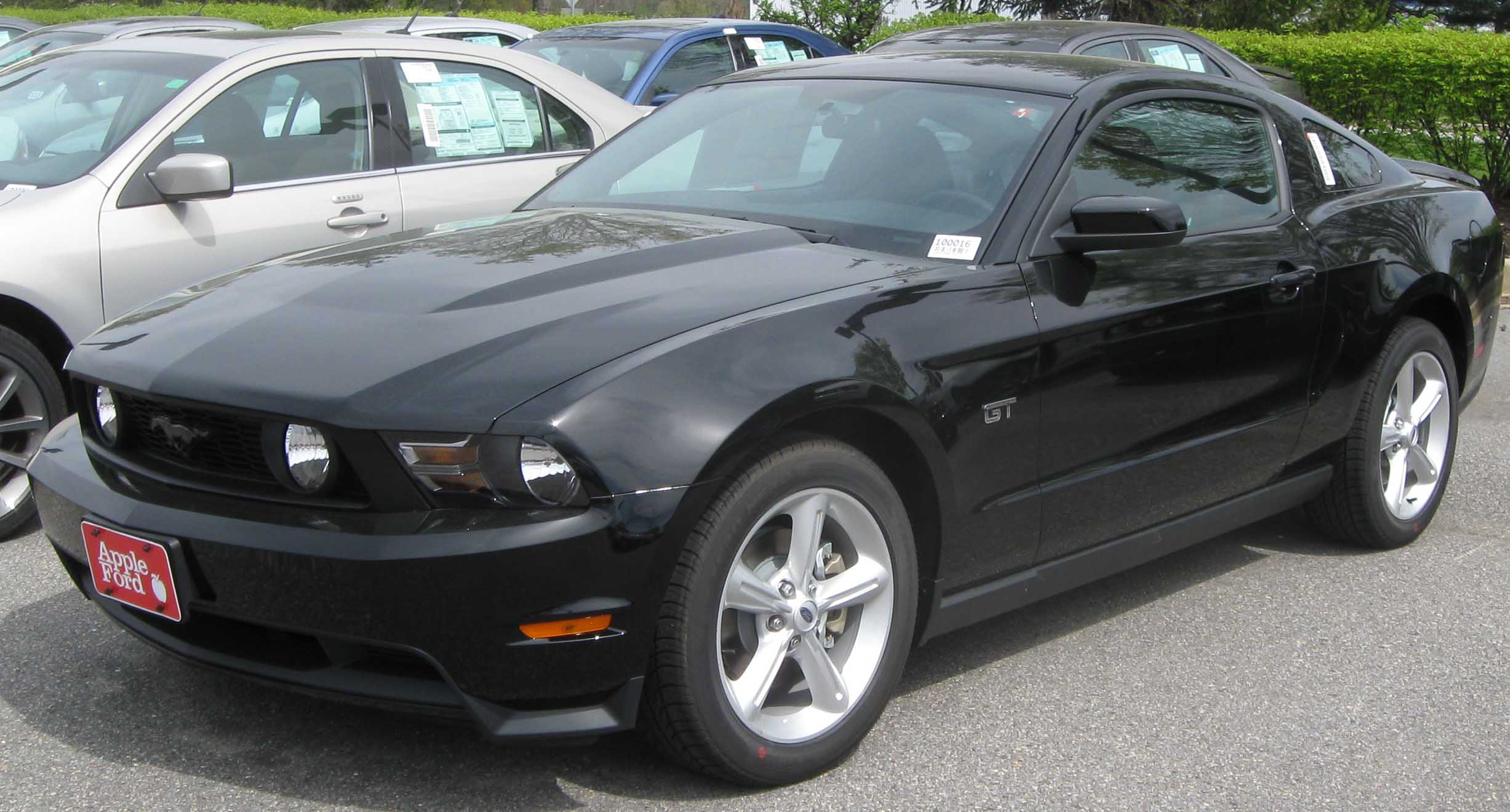
- 2010 Ford Mustang GT coupe

Overview
- Manufacturer: Ford
- Production: 2004–present
- Assembly: United States: Flat Rock, Michigan (Flat Rock Assembly)

Body and chassis
- Layout: FR layout
- Body styles: 2-door coupe 2-door convertible
- Vehicles: Ford Mustang (fifth generation); Ford Mustang (sixth generation); Ford Mustang (seventh generation)
- Related: Ford DEW platform

Dimensions
- Wheelbase: 107.1 in (2,720.3 mm)

Chronology
- Predecessor: Ford Fox platform

The Ford D2C platform (for "D-class 2-door coupe") is one of Ford's rear-wheel drive automobile platforms.

The platform basics are a MacPherson strut suspension in front and 3-link solid axle in the rear with a Panhard rod. Unlike previous Special Vehicle Team (SVT) Mustang variations, the Shelby GT500 does not include independent rear suspension, but instead has a solid rear axle.

Considered a new platform by Ford Motor Company, D2C is loosely based on the Ford DEW platform which served as the basis for the Lincoln LS, Ford Thunderbird, and Jaguar S-Type. The 2005 S197 Mustang was originally designed to use a "Lite" version of the DEW98 platform, but while that plan was eventually scrapped as too expensive, most D2C platform development completed prior to that decision was retained. This led to the carryover of several DEW98 chassis components. These components include the floor pans, portions of the transmission tunnel, the front frame rails, and basic fuel tank design.

Differences between D2C and DEW98 are most noticeable in the suspension: The DEW98-based Lincoln LS uses a 4-wheel independent double wishbone suspension. The D2C platform's MacPherson strut front suspension and solid axle rear suspension are less expensive to produce than DEW's more complicated setup. D2C also shares components with other Ford platforms. These include Ford's global C1 platform, with which D2C shares front strut and rear trailing arm components.

Ford's The Way Forward plan called for Mustang derivative models (such as a 4-door) to be launched by 2008, but that never occurred.

The next D2C-based Mustang was launched in Model Year 2015 with the new S550, adding an independent rear suspension (IRS). In 2023, the S650 became the third iteration of the Mustang to use the D2C platform, and featured several upgrades including new stabilizers, lower control arms, rear suspension links, shocks, and springs.
