= Lincoln LS =

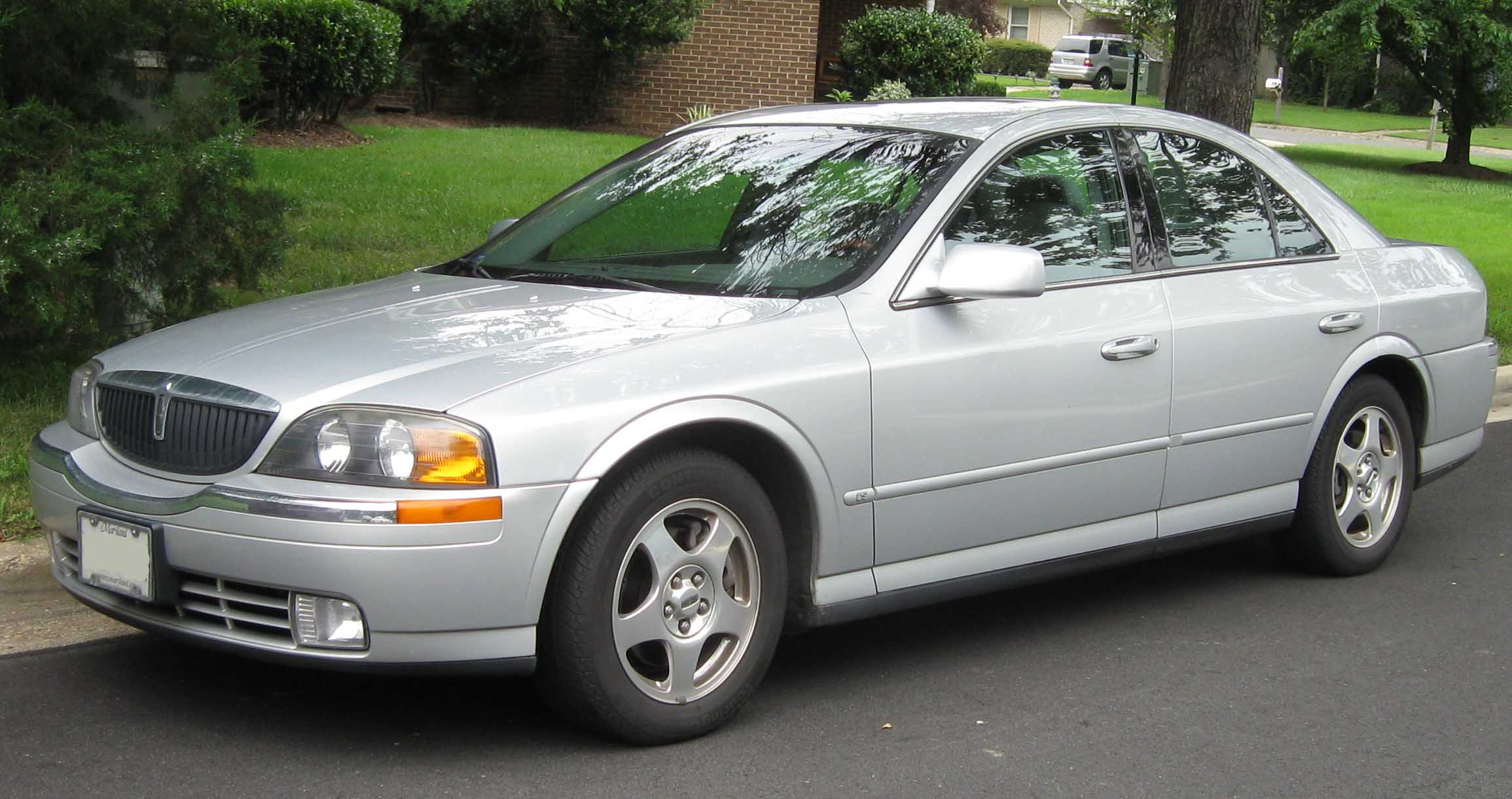
- 2000–2002 Lincoln LS

Overview
- Manufacturer: Lincoln Motor Company (Ford Motor Company)
- Production: 1999–2006
- Model years: 2000–2006
- Assembly: Wixom, Michigan, U.S.
- Designer: Helmuth Schrader (1995)

Body and chassis
- Class: Mid-size luxury car (E-segment / executive car)
- Body style: 4-door sedan
- Layout: FR layout
- Platform: Ford DEW98 platform
- Related: Ford Thunderbird; Jaguar S-Type; Jaguar XF

Powertrain
- Engine: 3.0 L Jaguar AJ / (Ford Duratec) V6 (gasoline); 3.9 L Jaguar AJ V8 (gasoline)
- Transmission: 2000–2002 Getrag 221 5-speed manual 2000–2002 Ford 5R55N 5-speed automatic 2003–2006 Ford 5R55S 5-speed automatic w/ SelectShift

Dimensions
- Wheelbase: 114.5 in (2,908 mm)
- Length: 2000–2005: 193.9 in (4,925 mm); 2006: 194.3 in (4,935 mm)
- Width: 73.2 in (1,859 mm)
- Height: 2000–2002: 57.2 in (1,453 mm); 2003–2006: 56.1 in (1,425 mm)
- Curb weight: 3,692 lb (1,675 kg)

Chronology
- Successor: Lincoln MKZ and Lincoln MKS

The Lincoln LS is a mid-size luxury car which was manufactured and marketed by the Lincoln Motor Company for the 2000-through-2006 model years, having entered production in June 1999. Primarily sold in the North American market, it is a four-door sedan with seating for five occupants. The LS has a front-engine, rear-wheel-drive layout and either a V8 or V6 engine, with the latter configuration initially offered with a manual transmission. Described as a sport sedan, it has a near 50/50 weight distribution, and aimed to provide a blend of luxury and sport to attract a new generation of buyers to the Lincoln brand.

Produced at a time when Lincoln formed a part of Ford's Premier Automotive Group division. the LS shared the Ford DEW98 platform with the Jaguar S-Type and the eleventh-generation Ford Thunderbird. Trim levels ranged from the base V6 model to the Special Edition V8 LSE trims in 2004, with revised front and rear fascia, taillights and foglights, and front grille.

LS models were manufactured at Ford's Wixom Assembly Plant until production ended on April 3, 2006, and the plant was idled as part of Ford's The Way Forward. Approximately 262,900 were manufactured, including 2,331 with manual transmissions and 1,500 LSE editions.

== 2000–2002 ==
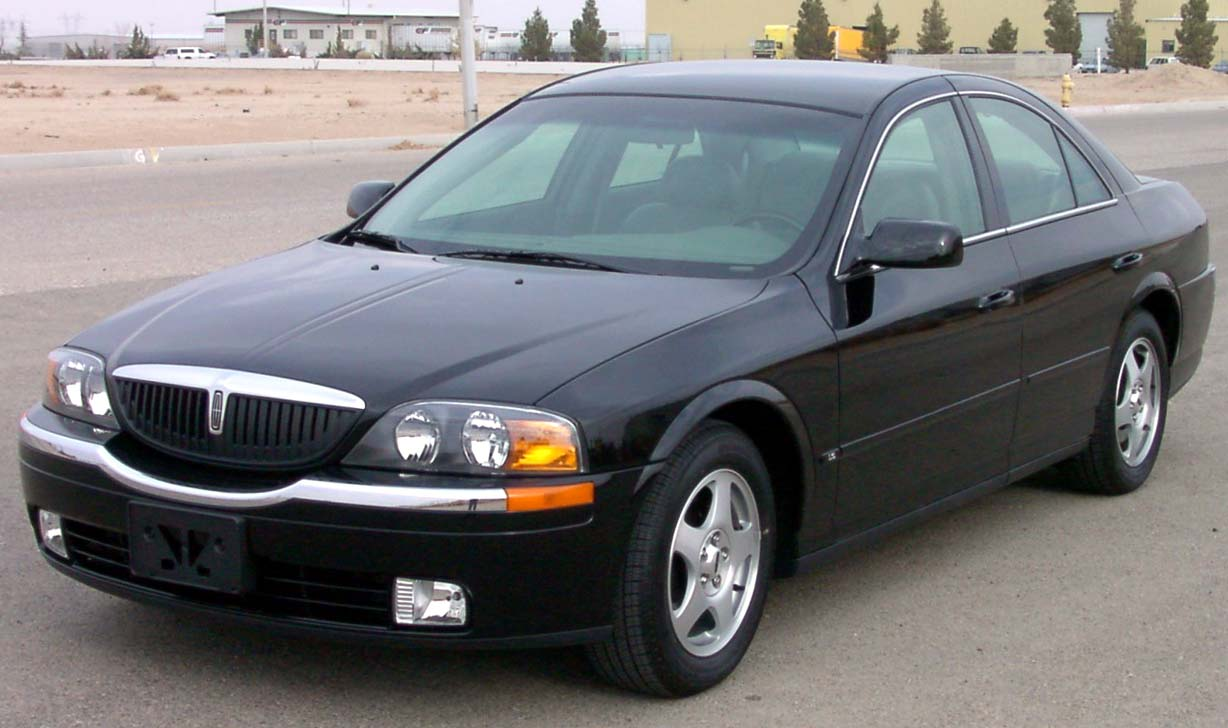
2001 Lincoln LS

In 1999, the LS debuted as Lincoln's first rear-wheel drive sport luxury sedan for the 2000 model year, under the influence of the newly established Premier Automotive Group.

Lincoln originally intended to market the sedan in two versions, the LS6 and the LS8, the names reflecting their respective engine layouts. Toyota's Lexus division noted concern about the potential name confusion with its Lexus LS full-size luxury sedan, and Lincoln ended up using only the name "LS". At the same time, Ford threatened a lawsuit regarding the Toyota T150 concept, arguing that the name was too close to that of the F150, so Toyota changed the name of their pickup truck to the Tundra.

In designing the LS to be competitive in its segment, the LS' German-born chief designer, said of the car, "In a segment defined and dominated by BMW and Mercedes, the car had to have a functional, no-nonsense look. This redefines the Lincoln brand, but we still had to make sure it was recognizable as a member of the same family as the Town Car, Continental, Mark VIII, and the Navigator." The LS featured understated exterior and interior styling.

Leather seating surfaces were standard, and the steering wheel could be wood or leather-wrapped, with the interior featuring wood accents. Standard features included power windows, power door locks with keyless entry, power heated mirrors, automatic headlights, air conditioning with automatic climate control, cruise control, and an AM/FM cassette radio. Available options included a six-disc in-dash CD changer (only accessible through the glove box initially; changed on later models), a power moonroof, and a universal garage door opener.

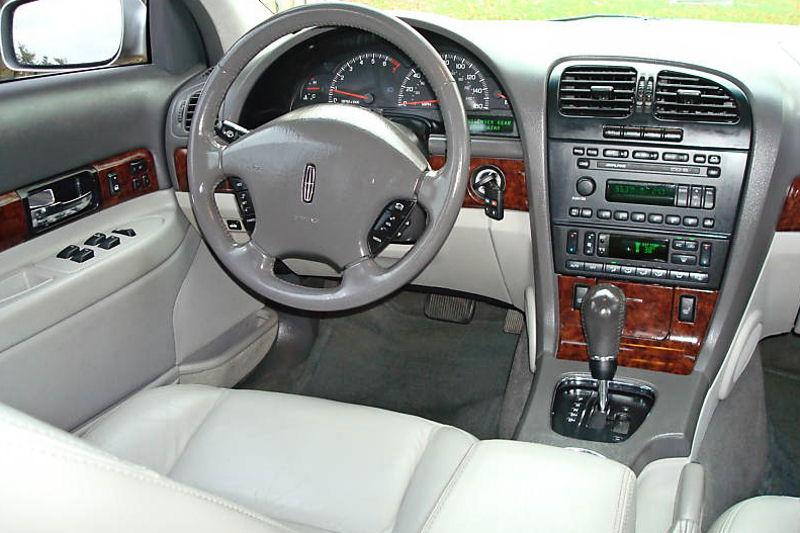
Instrument panel and dash area of a 2002 Lincoln LS

The LS's The DEW98 platform, shared with the Jaguar S-Type, used independent double wishbone (short-long arm; SLA) front and rear suspensions and a 114.5-inch (2,910 mm) wheelbase. Four-wheel antilock disc brakes were standard, and a traction control system, marketed as AdvanceTrac was optional. Numerous suspension components, as well as the hood, decklid, and front fenders, were aluminum. The LS came with standard 16-inch alloy wheels, while 17-inch wheels were available through an optional sport package. The sport package for an extra $1,000 included a stiffer suspension, 17-inch wheels, and manual shift capability for the automatic transmission. The battery of the LS was located in the spare tire well in the car's trunk.

The base LS had an all-aluminum 3.0 L DOHC V6 was a variant of the Jaguar AJ-V6 engine, itself closely related to Ford's Duratec 3.0. Optional was an all-aluminum 3.9 L DOHC V8, a shorter-stroke variant of the Jaguar 4.0 L AJ-26 V8. Both engines required premium-grade gasoline. Ford's 5R55S five-speed automatic transmission with an optional manual shift ability called SelectShift was standard with either engine. In contrast, a Getrag 221 five-speed manual transmission was available for V6-equipped LS models when equipped with an optional sport package. Automatic transmission-equipped cars featured a 3.58:1 rear-axle ratio, while manual transmission-equipped versions had a 3.07:1 rear-axle ratio. Lincoln stopped production of the manual-transmission model LS after 2,331 were manufactured.

The powertrain control module in 2000 through 2002 automatic transmission models with the SelectShift option was initially programmed to prevent launching in first gear; i.e., the car would default to a second gear launch. A first-gear launch was available by depressing the throttle by more than 60%. Second-gear launches were programmed to meet EPA fuel economy regulations. For the 2003 model year, first-gear launches were programmed into the transmission, reflecting revised fuel economy regulations.

In 2002, the LSE (Limited Special Edition) package was introduced in V6 and V8 versions, with a revised fascia including round fog lamp openings and a special metallic grille treatment, with enlarged lower body rocker panels, special wheels, and twin dual-exhaust tailpipes. Also for 2002, V6-equipped LS models gained 10 hp (7.5 kW) and 10 lb⋅ft (14 N⋅m) of torque.

Years	Model	Engine	Power	Torque	Fuel Economy, City/Hwy	Transmission
2000–2001	LS V6	2,967 cc (3 L; 181 cu in) Jaguar AJ V6	210 hp (157 kW) @ 6500 rpm	205 lb⋅ft (278 N⋅m) @ 4750 rpm	18 mpg_{‑US} (13 L/100 km; 22 mpg_{‑imp}) / 25 mpg_{‑US} (9.4 L/100 km; 30 mpg_{‑imp})	Getrag 221 manual & 5R55N automatic
2002	LS V6	2,967 cc (3 L; 181 cu in) Jaguar AJ V6	220 hp (164 kW) @ 6400 rpm	215 lb⋅ft (292 N⋅m) @ 4800 rpm	18 mpg_{‑US} (13 L/100 km; 22 mpg_{‑imp}) / 25 mpg_{‑US} (9.4 L/100 km; 30 mpg_{‑imp})	Getrag 221 manual & 5R55N automatic
2000–2002	LS V8	3,934 cc (3.9 L; 240.1 cu in) Jaguar AJ-V8	252 hp (188 kW) @ 6100 rpm	267 lb⋅ft (362 N⋅m) @ 4300 rpm	17 mpg_{‑US} (14 L/100 km; 20 mpg_{‑imp}) / 23 mpg_{‑US} (10 L/100 km; 28 mpg_{‑imp})	5R55N automatic

== 2003–2006 ==
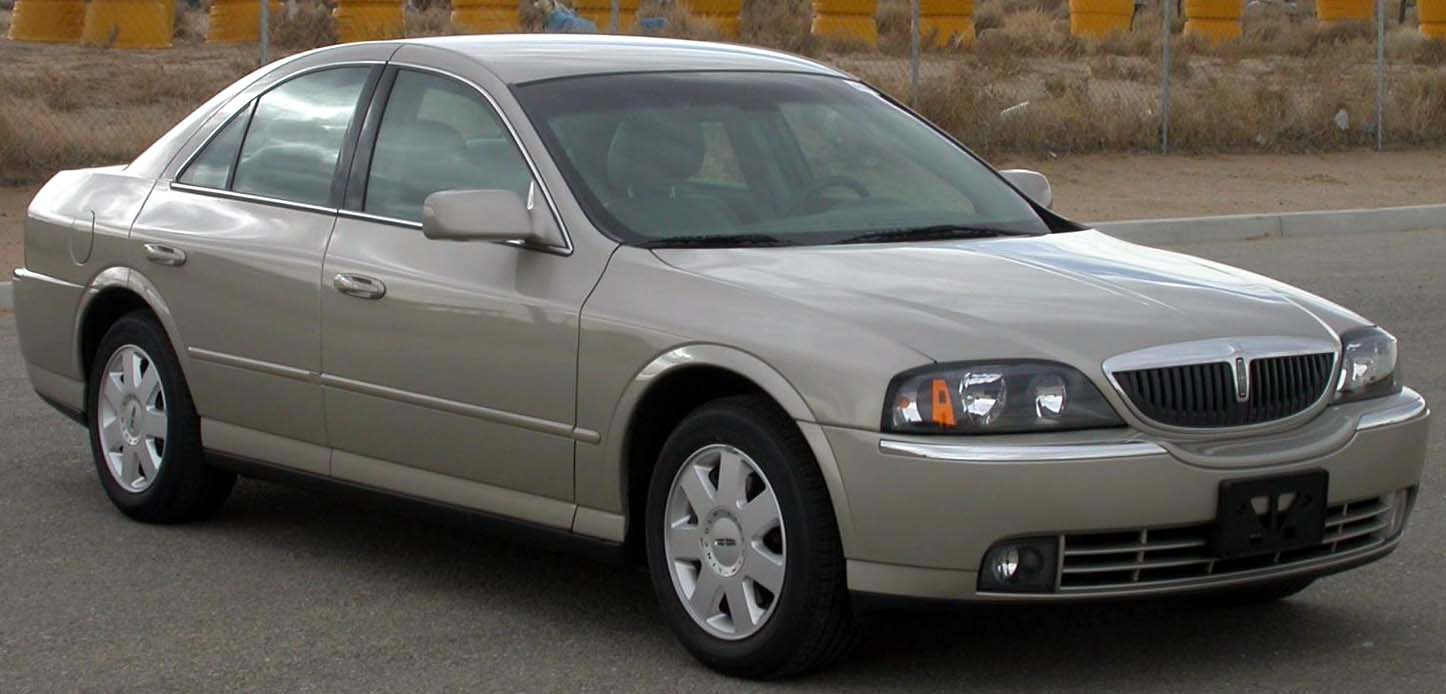
2004 Lincoln LS

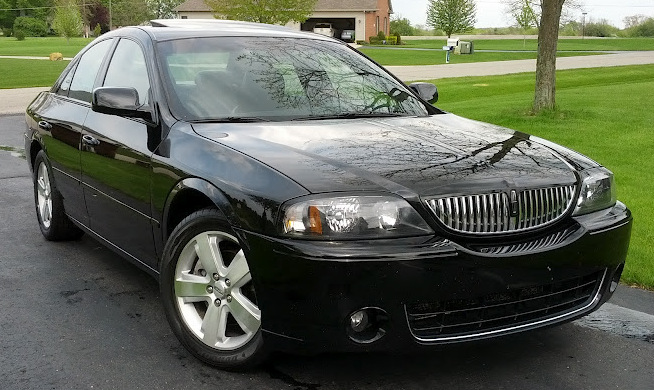
2006 Lincoln LS

The LS received a refresh for 2003, coinciding with Lincoln's then-new "Travel Well" ad campaign. The exterior received HID headlamps (optional) and a revised trunk lid with revised taillights.

Both available engines received a boost in power and torque, as well as slightly improved fuel efficiency. The 3.0 L DOHC V6 with which the LS was introduced now featured continuously variable intake cam timing, improved variable-length intake runners, and electronic "drive-by-wire" throttle control (which replaced the traditional mechanical cable-linked throttle control system used previously). The optional 3.9 L DOHC V8 introduced variable exhaust-valve timing. Due to its upgraded design, the 3.9 L V8 now produced over 87% of its peak torque output at only 2000 rpm, thus cars equipped with the V8 could now accelerate from zero to 60 mph (97 km/h) in around 6.5 seconds.

Other revisions included an electronic push-button parking brake (similar to that of the BMW E65 7 Series), replacing the center console-mounted hand lever (or foot pedal), a touchscreen DVD satellite navigation map system, and an industry-first, 10-speaker THX-certified sound system. LSE versions were also available in the 2004 and 2005 model years, with unique fascia, unique 17-inch wheels, all-red taillights, a color-keyed grille, unique floormats, and additional wood paneling in the interior.

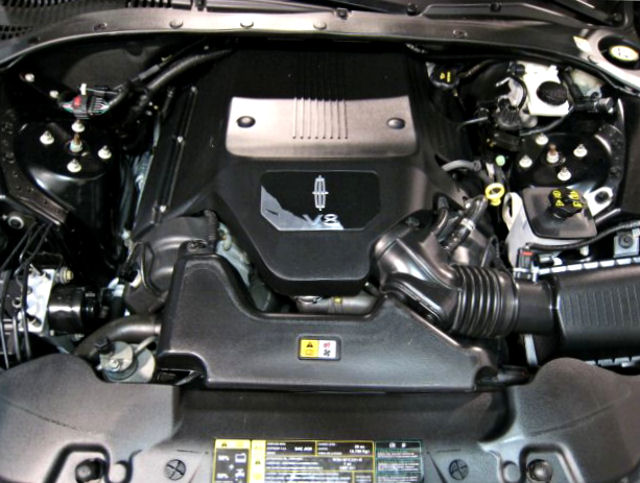
V8 engine bay of a 2006 Lincoln LS

Early LS models had a mechanical engine cooling fan operated with a hydraulic pump because the electrical charging system had insufficient capacity to power an electric fan effectively. However, a revised alternator enabled the implementation of an electric fan for the 2003 through 2006 models.

The 2003 to 2006 GPS navigation system uses a DVD player mounted in the trunk (under the package tray) to contain the map data.

For 2006, the LS received exterior revision similar to the LSE fascia trim from previous model years. The V6-powered model was dropped from the lineup. The base MSRP increased from $32,370 in 2004 to $39,285.

Years	Model	Engine	Power	Torque	Fuel Economy, City/Hwy	Transmission
2003–2005	LS V6	2,967 cc (3.0 L; 181.1 cu in) Jaguar AJ V6	232 hp (173 kW) @ 6750 rpm	220 lb⋅ft (298 N⋅m) @ 4500 rpm	20 mpg_{‑US} (12 L/100 km; 24 mpg_{‑imp}) / 26 mpg_{‑US} (9.0 L/100 km; 31 mpg_{‑imp})	5R55S automatic
2003–2006	LS V8	3,934 cc (3.9 L; 240.1 cu in) Jaguar AJ-V8	280 hp (209 kW) @ 6000 rpm	286 lb⋅ft (388 N⋅m) @ 4000 rpm	18 mpg_{‑US} (13 L/100 km; 22 mpg_{‑imp}) / 25 mpg_{‑US} (9.4 L/100 km; 30 mpg_{‑imp})	5R55S automatic

== Reception ==
The Lincoln LS was named Motor Trend's Car of the Year for 2000 and was also nominated for the North American Car of the Year award. Road tests by Motor Trend and Car and Driver found that a V8-equipped LS could accelerate from zero to 60 mph (97 km/h) in the low seven-second range, while V6 models were up to two seconds slower in the same test, while driving dynamics were impressive considering that Lincoln's other offerings were weak in this regard compared to luxury imports. The LS was touted for its value as a sport sedan since it undercut other mid-size luxury (E-segment / executive car) offerings from German and Japanese marques; the LS V8 was priced similarly to six-cylinder-equipped versions of the BMW 5 Series and Lexus GS. While larger and roomier, the LS was also less refined than its competitors in terms of interior quality and handling.

=== Safety ===
The Lincoln LS has received very high marks in occupant protection. The Insurance Institute for Highway Safety has rated the LS as a "Best Pick" with a perfect score in their frontal offset crash test. The National Highway Traffic Safety Administration gave the LS almost perfect scores in its front impact, side-impact and rollover tests. CNBC rated the LS as “one of the five safest cars of all time.”

=== Sales ===
Calendar year	American sales
1999	26,368
2000	51,039
2001	39,787
2002	39,775
2003	33,581
2004	27,066
2005	19,109
2006	8,797
Total	245,522

== Milestones ==
- 1999 Lincoln introduced the LS as a 2000 model.
- 2000 Motor Trend magazine named the LS “Car of the Year”.
- 2001 LS earned double five-star frontal safety ratings from the federal government.
- 2003 More than 500 revisions, including a power increase, design, and interior changes.
- 2004 LS earned a “Best Pick” safety rating from the Insurance Institute for Highway Safety.
- 2006 LS production ended in April after 262,900 were built over 7 years.
