= Ford Taurus (fifth generation) =

Ford Taurus (fifth generation; D258)
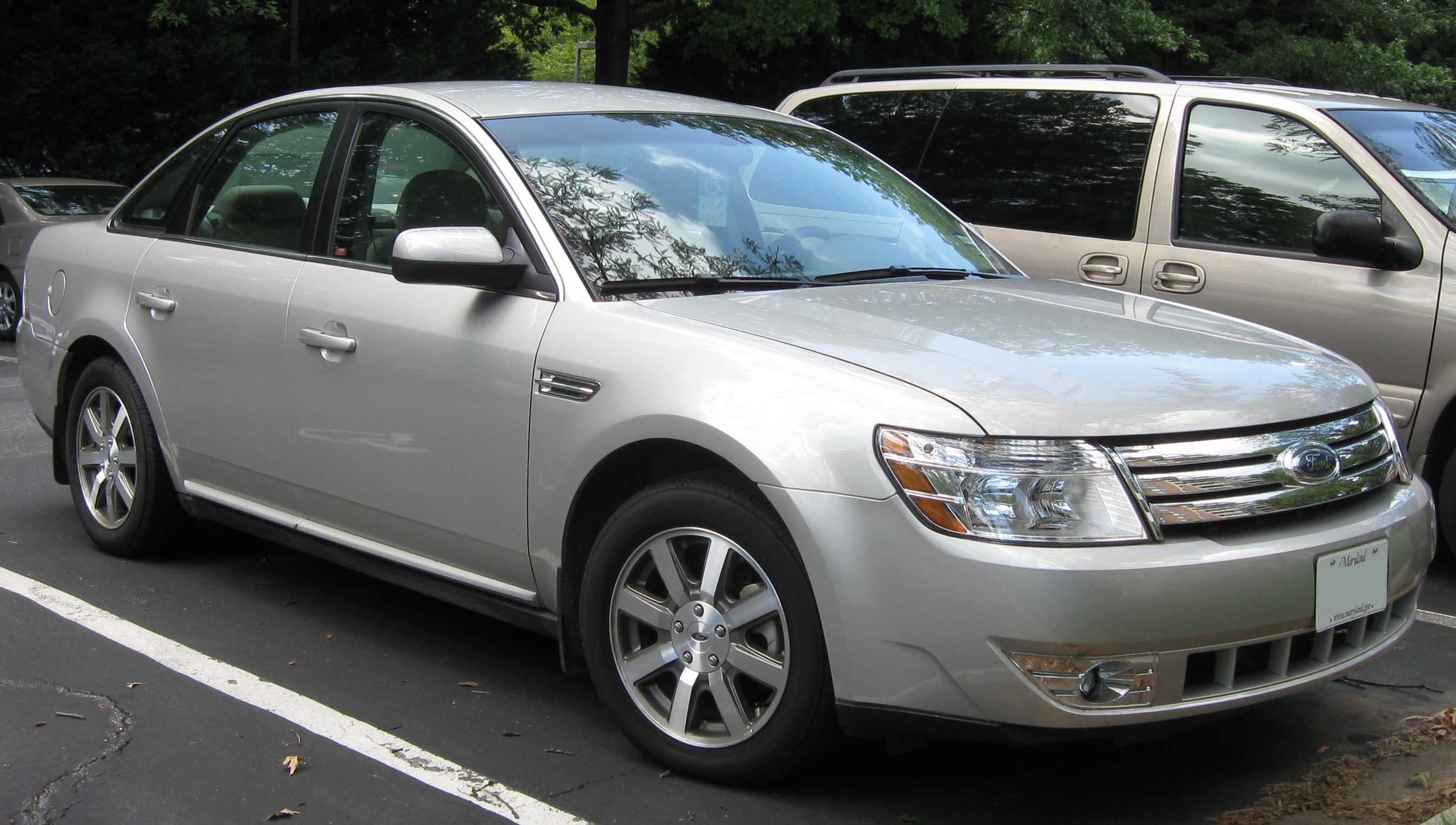

Overview
- Manufacturer: Ford
- Also called: Ford Five Hundred (Middle East)
- Production: May 2007–May 2009
- Model years: 2008–2009
- Assembly: United States: Chicago, Illinois (Chicago Assembly)
- Designer: J Mays (2005)

Body and chassis
- Class: Full-size car
- Body style: 4-door sedan
- Layout: FF layout; F4 layout
- Platform: Ford D3 platform
- Related: Ford Taurus X; Mercury Sable

Powertrain
- Engine: 3.5 L DOHC Duratec 35 (Cyclone) V6
- Transmission: 6-speed 6F automatic

Dimensions
- Wheelbase: 112.7 in (2,863 mm)
- Length: 201.8 in (5,126 mm)
- Width: 74.1 in (1,882 mm)
- Height: 61.5 in (1,562 mm)
- Curb weight: FWD: 3,741 lb (1,697 kg); AWD: 3,930 lb (1,780 kg)

Chronology
- Predecessor: Ford Taurus (fourth generation); Ford Five Hundred; Ford Crown Victoria
- Successor: Ford Taurus (sixth generation)

The fifth generation of the Ford Taurus is a sedan that was marketed by Ford for the 2008 and 2009 model years. Marking the return of the model line after a hiatus of less than a year, the fifth-generation Taurus is a mid-cycle revision of the Ford Five Hundred, making the Taurus a full-size car for the first time. The model line also became the flagship Ford sedan, as Ford withdrew the Crown Victoria from retail sale. The model line was also sold as the Ford Taurus X three-row wagon (a revision of the Ford Freestyle). The fifth-generation Taurus was marketed in North America, South Korea, Mexico, and the Middle East. Outside the United States, Canada, and South Korea, it retained the previous Ford Five Hundred branding.

As the Taurus adopted the D3 architecture introduced by the Five Hundred, several firsts were made to the model line. The Taurus gained all-wheel drive as an option for the first time, along with a 6-speed automatic transmission and a standard overhead-cam V6 engine. In a similar rebranding, the Mercury Montego was replaced by the return of the Mercury Sable; coinciding with the closure of the Mercury brand, this was the final version of the Sable. For the first time, Lincoln did not market a counterpart of the Taurus as the Continental (instead designing the Lincoln MKS from the sixth-generation Taurus).

Ford assembled the Taurus in its Chicago Assembly facility (Chicago, Illinois) alongside the Mercury Sable, Taurus X, and Lincoln MKS (for 2009).

== Design ==
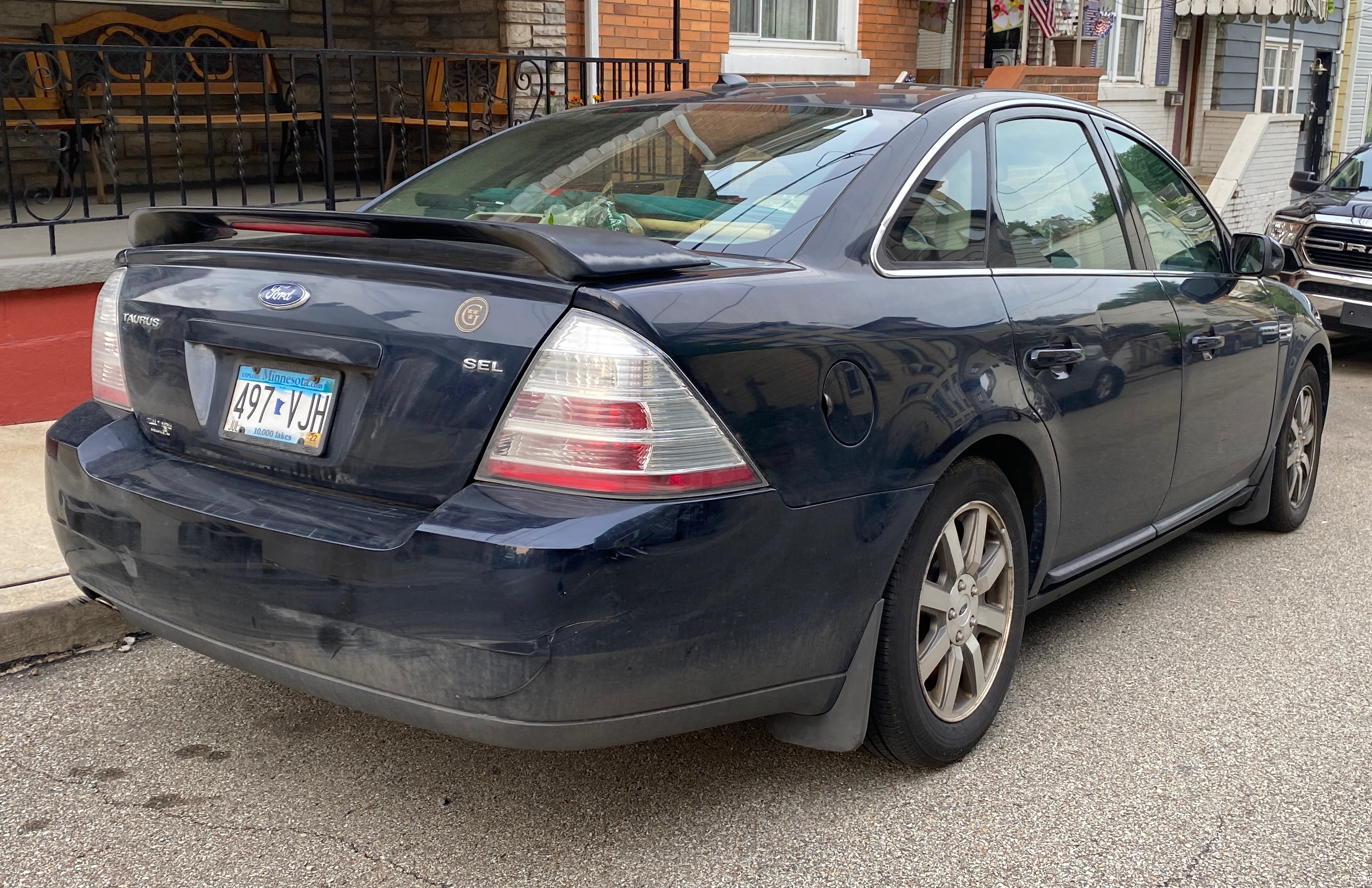
Rear

Ford originally introduced the 2008 model as the Ford Five Hundred, presenting press releases and featuring the car at the January 2007 Detroit International Auto Show. The car was subsequently rebranded as the Taurus at the behest of Ford CEO Allan Mulally.

As a rebranded and modified Five Hundred, the 5G Taurus received a 30% increase in engine horsepower; front facelift; faux fender vents; chrome door handle accents, and revised tail lights.

The fifth generation featured comprehensive increased sound-absorption measures, including foam pellets expanded into the A-pillars and a new sound-absorptive material, marketed as Sonosorb, used doors, headliner and pillars. Upgraded mastic in the floor and the addition of sound deadening material in the door, trunk and under the carpet further reduce road and wind noise. The area where the rear package shelf meets the floor pan was stiffened, and the package shelf was reshaped to reduce vibration.

The fifth generation Taurus used a new six-speed automatic transmission (jointly developed with General Motors), superseding the Five Hundred's Aisin six-speed or optional CVT. A revised climate control system uses a large piston compressor and redesigned air delivery to reduce interior noise, as well as how air is blended and reshaping ducts. At max setting the system is 50 percent quieter than the 2007 Five Hundred.

On the 2005-2007 Five Hundred, the roughly 600-lb engine was bolted to a sub frame. With the 5G Taurus, the engine was bolted to the unibody frame rails. By not having the engine bearing on the sub frame, the stiffened subframe could address suspension requirements. Front suspension travel was increased by 10 mm (10%) and suspension was retuned.

=== Exterior ===
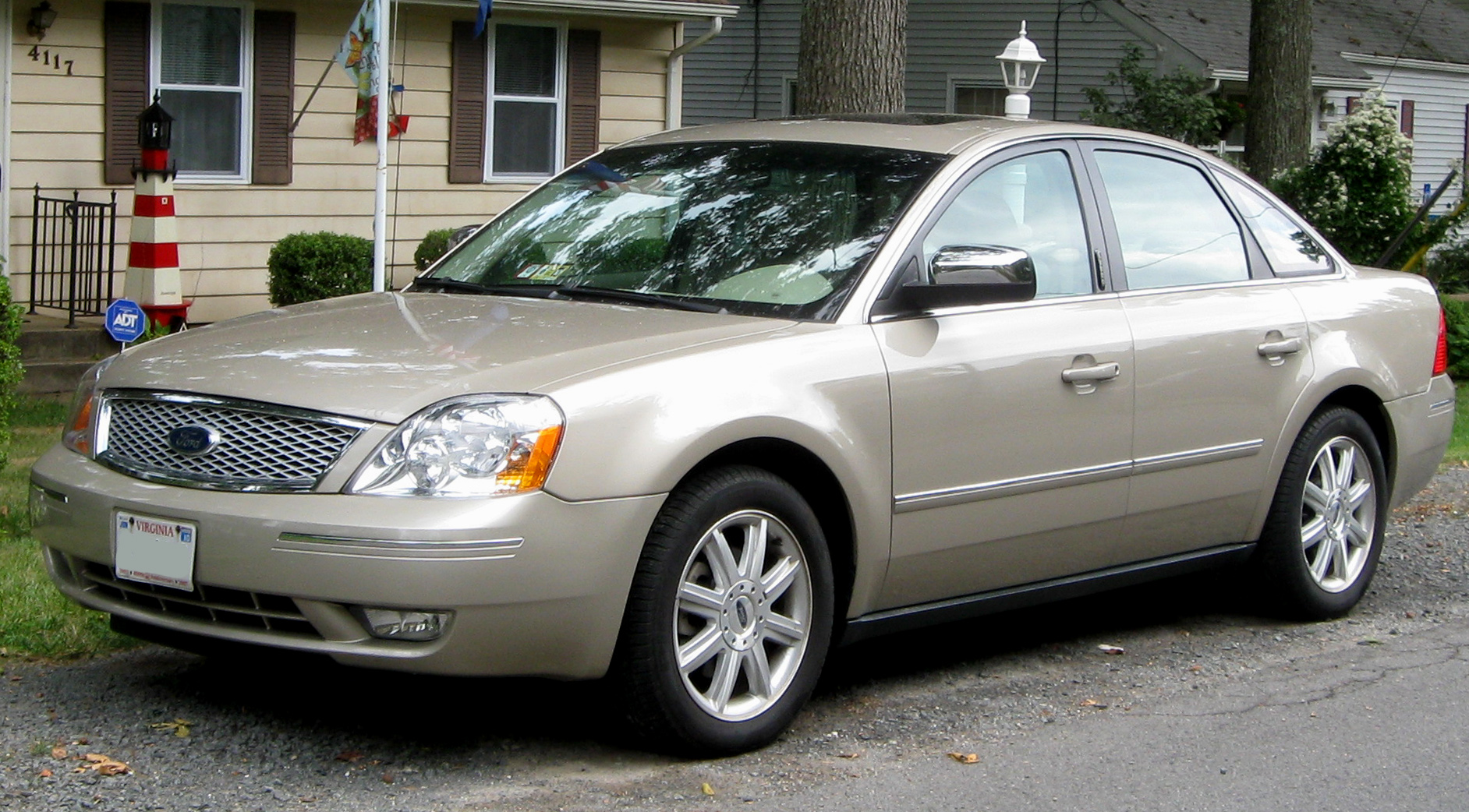
The 5G Taurus was an upgraded and rebranded Five Hundred.

The exterior featured a revised front fascia with a three-bar grille, headlights, and fog lights; revised tail lights; relocated and smaller side mirrors, roof-mounted satellite radio antenna; and chrome-trimmed faux fender vents. Each trim level featured new wheels.

Ford's chief designer Peter Horbury noted that the Five Hundred's styling had been problematic, and said of the front and rear facia modifications: "when we did the face lift, and it became the Taurus; it didn't set the world on fire, either. If you remodeled either end of the Sydney Harbour Bridge, I'm sure you’d still know what it was."

=== Interior ===
As with the exterior, the interior of the 5G Taurus is largely carried over from the Five Hundred with subtle differences such as darker simulated woodgrain and revised steering wheel. Ford relocated the wiper switch from the left side (as with the Five Hundred) to the turn signal stalk on the right side, as has been the design of every Taurus since its 1986 introduction.

The interior featured a revised radio faceplate with chrome trim around the buttons, revised shifter design and revised double-tiered clamshell center console, A two-tier clamshell center console, where the cover can be opened to expose the upper tier, a 10.75 cu. ft. storage bin where opening both lid and upper storage bin gives access to a second, larger storage area offering secure. The center console comes with a new auxiliary audio input jack and an additional power point. Notably, the 5G Taurus features Ford's SYNC system, developed by Microsoft, which accepts voice commands and can connect the driver's cell phones and MP3 players to the car, while organizing personal information.

=== Models and engines ===
The 5G Taurus was offered in SE, SEL, and Limited trim levels. The SE retailed around $24,000 US$, with the middle option SEL at $26,000 and the Limited at $30,000. This generation of Taurus uses the 263-hp 3.5-L Duratec 35 V6, which replaces the 203 hp (151 kW) Duratec 30 3.0-L V6. The Five Hundred/Freestyle's ZF-Batavia CVT, which had a maximum torque capacity of 221 lb⋅ft (300 N⋅m), is also replaced with a Ford-GM joint venture six-speed automatic capable of withstanding the Duratec 35's additional torque. The Aisin AW six-speed automatic that was used on FWD Five Hundred and Montegos was also replaced by the GM-Ford 6-speed automatic transmission.

== Taurus nameplate ==
The fourth-generation (4G) Ford Taurus was manufactured concurrently with a larger, new front-wheel drive sedan, the Ford Five Hundred and was discontinued in late 2006 for model year 2007. After discontinuation of the 4G Taurus, the Five Hundred, which did not perform to expectations, was rebranded as the 5G Taurus.

Autoblog and The Truth About Cars expressed disappointment that Ford let the Taurus nameplate decline. MSNBC interviewed many Ford workers who felt that Ford unjustly abandoned the car that had done so much to revitalize Ford and the US industry. In an October 25, 2006 USA Today editorial, "How Ford starved its Taurus", it was noted that while the Japanese stick with their popular models and keep them up to date and competitive, (such as the Toyota Corolla, which has been in continuous production since the 1960s), the Detroit automakers regularly abandon established models in search of "the next big thing".

How can it go away? It's the best selling car in America.

— Alan Mulally, 2006

After taking the position as CEO at Ford, Alan Mulally said in an interview with the Associated Press that he was baffled the Taurus had been discontinued, saying he believed discontinuing the Taurus was a mistake, and that the Five Hundred should have been named "Taurus" from the beginning. In mid-2007, revamped versions of the Five Hundred and Freestyle were unveiled as "Taurus" and "Taurus X" at the 2007 Chicago Auto Show. In a later interview, Mulally said the Taurus name was well known and had positive brand equity, something that would take time and money to give to the Five Hundred.

== Variants ==
=== Mercury Sable ===
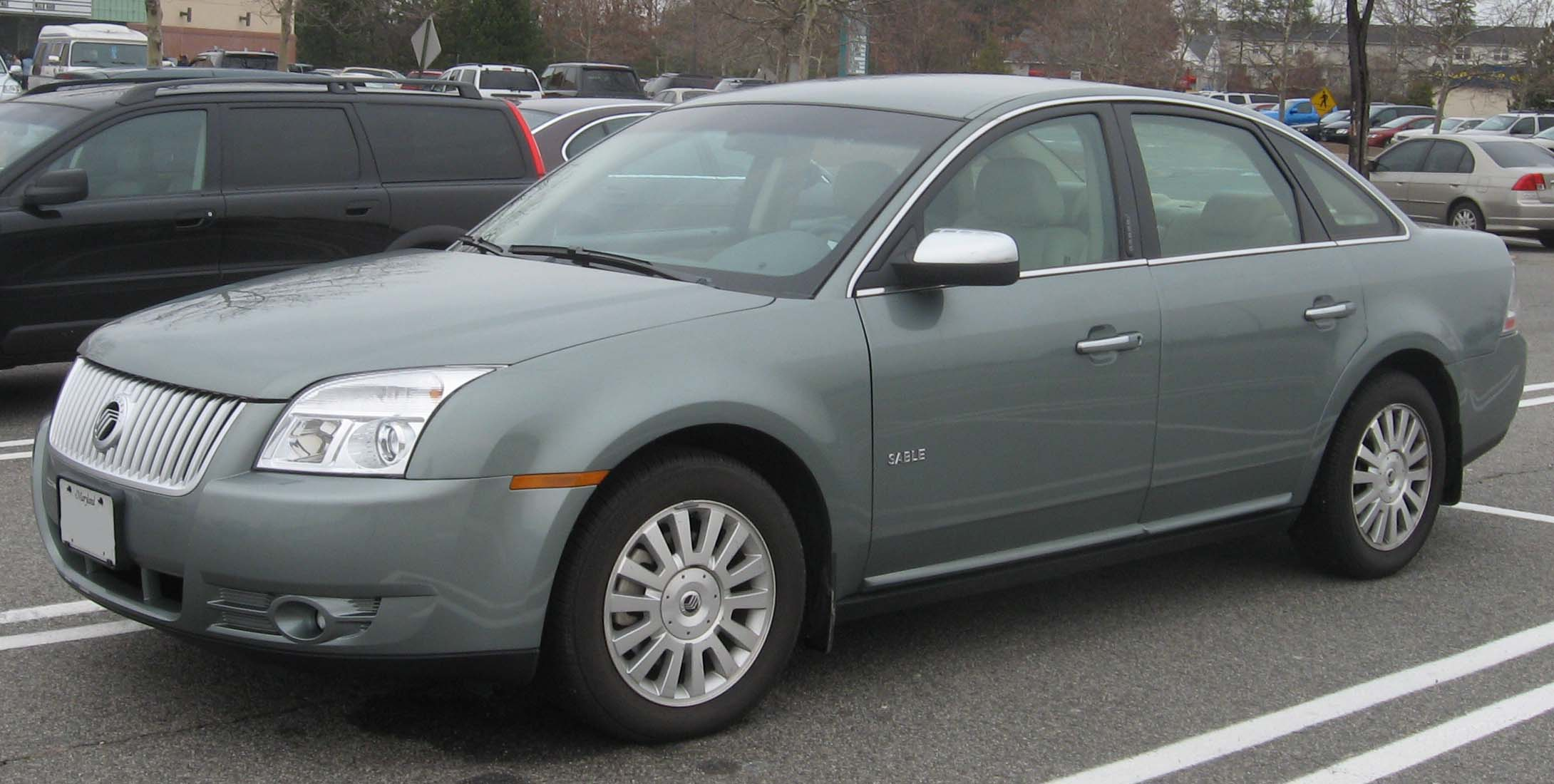
2008 Mercury Sable

For the 2008 model year, the Mercury Montego received the same midcycle update as the Ford Five Hundred; in line with the revival of the Ford Taurus, the Montego was renamed the Mercury Sable. Receiving the same 3.5-L V6 and six-speed automatic as the Taurus, cosmetic updates to the Sable were more extensive, with a redesigned front and rear fasciae, larger grille, and clear-lens taillamps. The redesigned interior adopted several changes, including two-tone leather seating, with hydrographically printed woodgrain in multiple color patterns.

With the end of the Mercury brand, Sable production ended after the 2009 model year, no Mercury Sable counterpart of the sixth-generation Taurus entered production.

=== Ford Taurus X ===
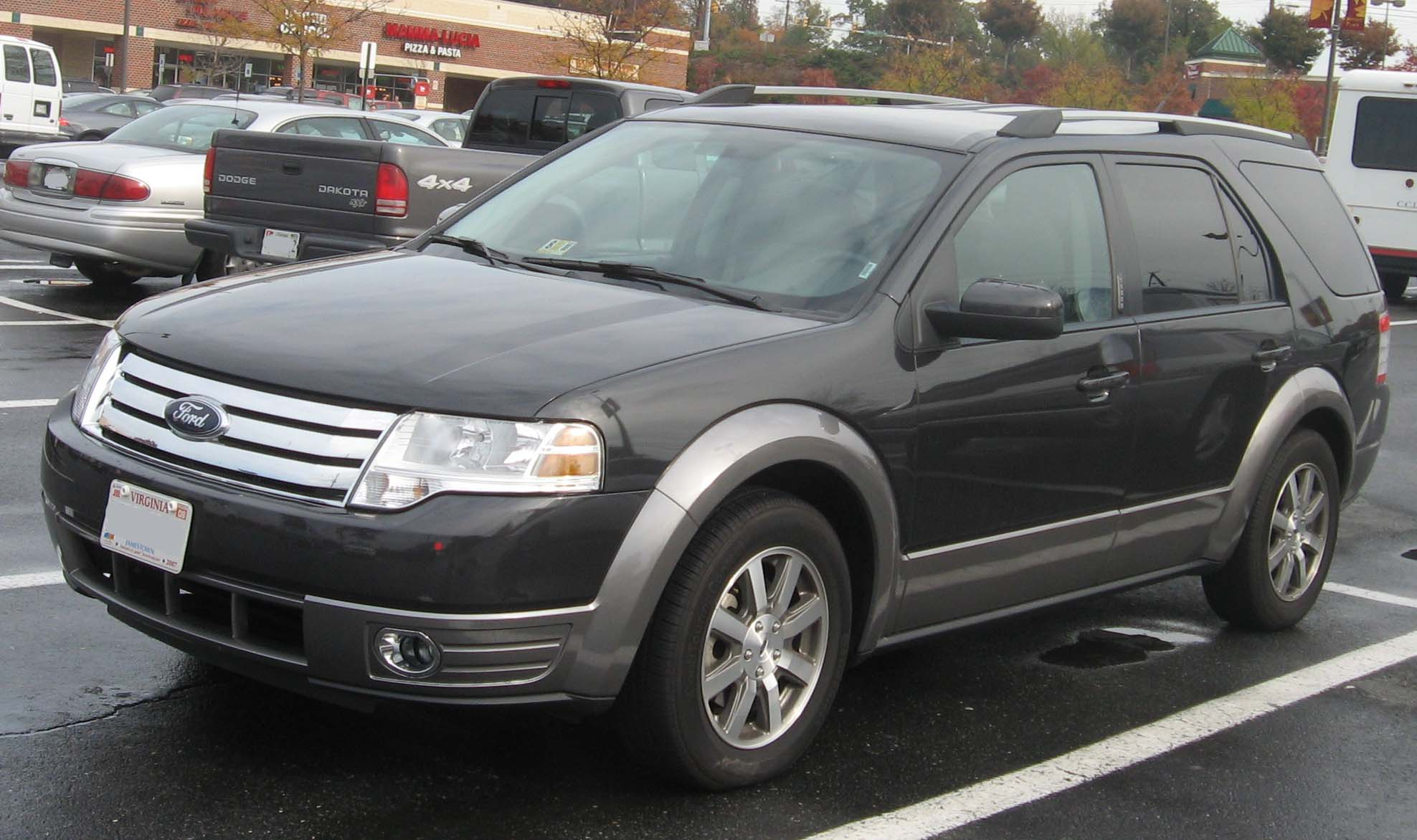
2008 Ford Taurus X SEL

Alongside the midcycle update to the Ford Five Hundred/Mercury Montego, for 2008, the Ford Freestyle crossover SUV received a similar update, adopting the Ford Taurus X nameplate. Sharing the powertrain of the Taurus/Sable, the Taurus X adopted a revised front fascia, similar to the Taurus sedan. In line with larger Ford SUVs, the Taurus X offered an outdoors-themed Eddie Bauer edition for the first time. Following lower than expected sales, the Taurus X ended production on February 27, 2009; while not an official replacement, the Ford Flex is also a crossover SUV based upon the D3-platform Ford Taurus.

== Water pump issues ==
Water pumps on 2008 to 2009 Ford Taurus, 2008 to 2009 Mercury Sable, 2008 to 2009 Ford Taurus X, and 2013 to 2019 Ford Police Interceptor Sedan equipped with the 3.5-L Ford Cyclone V6, 3.5-L EcoBoost V6, and 3.7-L V6 have a tendency to fail and potentially ruin the engine. The water pumps on these engines are internally mounted and driven by the timing chain. As a result, when they fail, antifreeze is sometimes dumped directly into the crankcase; mixing with engine oil and potentially damaging the head gaskets and connecting rod bearings. Some of these water pump failures occur without warning, although most present themselves externally first, by way of a weephole that expels coolant next to the alternator. Repairs can cost thousands of dollars as the engine must be partially disassembled, or removed, to access the water pump. In some cases, the engine will need to be replaced outright, if the warning signs are ignored. A class-action lawsuit was initiated against Ford as a result of this issue, but no settlement was reached against Ford.
