= Ford Freestyle =

Crossover utility vehicle by Ford (2005–2009)

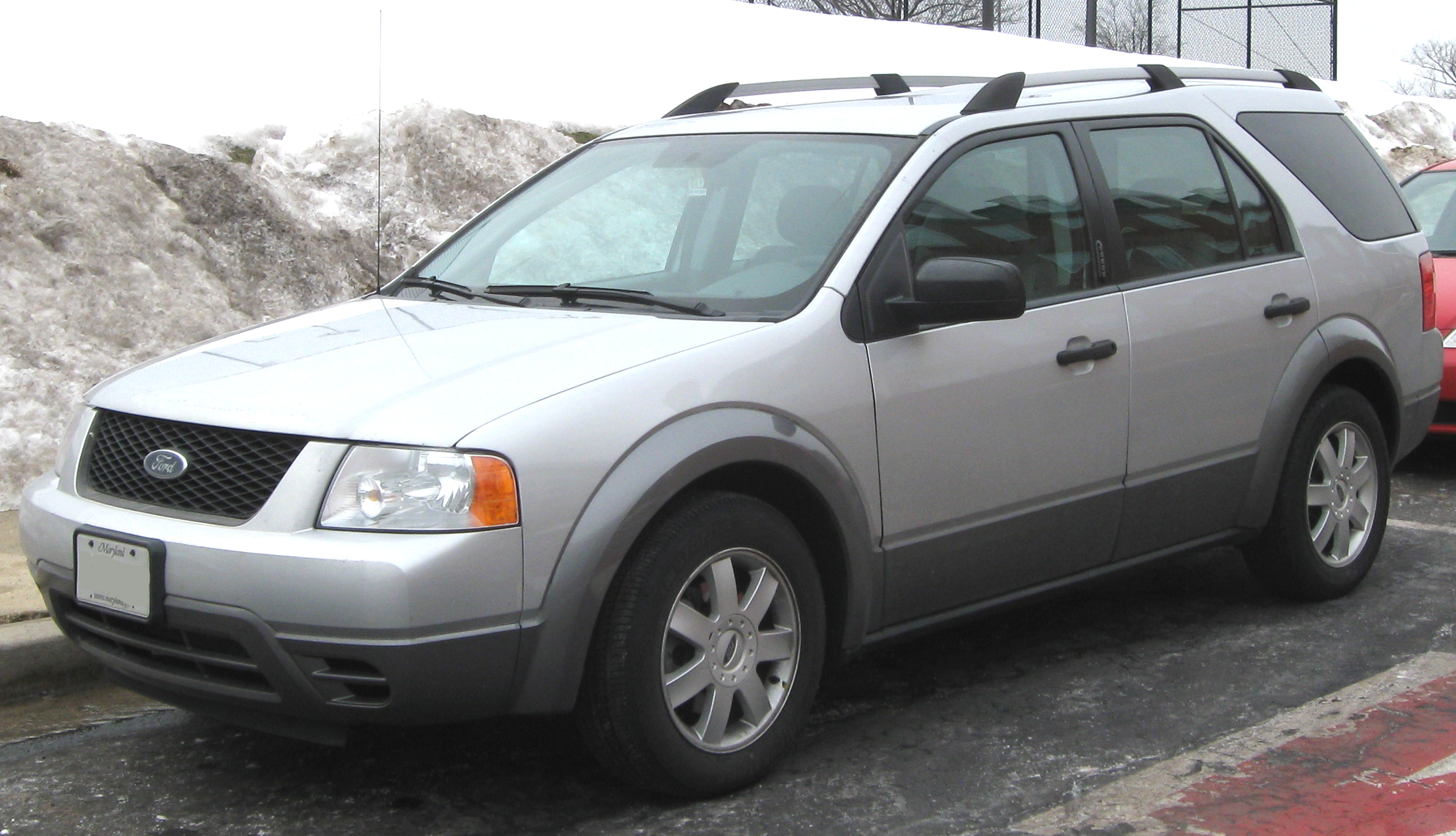
- 2005–2007 Ford Freestyle SE

Overview
- Manufacturer: Ford
- Also called: Ford Taurus X (2008–2009)
- Production: 2005–2007 (Freestyle); 2008–2009 (Taurus X)
- Model years: 2005–2007 (Freestyle); 2008–2009 (Taurus X)
- Assembly: United States: Chicago, Illinois (Chicago Assembly)
- Designer: Edward Golden

Body and chassis
- Class: Full-size crossover SUV
- Body style: 4-door SUV
- Layout: Front-engine, front-wheel drive / four-wheel drive
- Platform: Ford D3 platform
- Related: Ford Taurus/Ford Five Hundred; Mercury Montego/Sable

Dimensions
- Wheelbase: 112.9 in (2,868 mm)
- Length: 199.8 in (5,075 mm)
- Width: 74.4 in (1,890 mm)
- Height: 68.2 in (1,732 mm)
- Curb weight: 3,959–4,112 lb (1,796–1,865 kg)

Chronology
- Predecessor: Ford Taurus wagon
- Successor: Ford Flex (Full-size crossover SUV); Ford Explorer (Taurus X)

The Ford Freestyle is a crossover utility vehicle that was sold by Ford from 2005 to 2009. Largely marketed as the successor to the Ford Taurus station wagon, the Freestyle was the CUV counterpart of the Ford Five Hundred and Mercury Montego four-door sedans. Sharing the Ford D3 platform with the Five Hundred and Montego, the Freestyle was produced with both front-wheel drive and all-wheel drive configurations and six- or seven-passenger seating.

Following the return of the Ford Taurus for the 2008 model year, the Freestyle underwent a mid-cycle revision and was renamed the Ford Taurus X, marketed in the United States and Canada, as well as South Korea and the U.S. territories of Puerto Rico, U.S. Virgin Islands, and Guam. Following the 2009 model year, the Taurus X was withdrawn. From the 2009 model year, the larger Ford Flex has served as the three-row Ford CUV/wagon.

From 2005 to 2009, the Freestyle/Taurus X was assembled at Chicago Assembly (Chicago, Illinois); the final vehicle was produced on February 27, 2009.

== Background ==
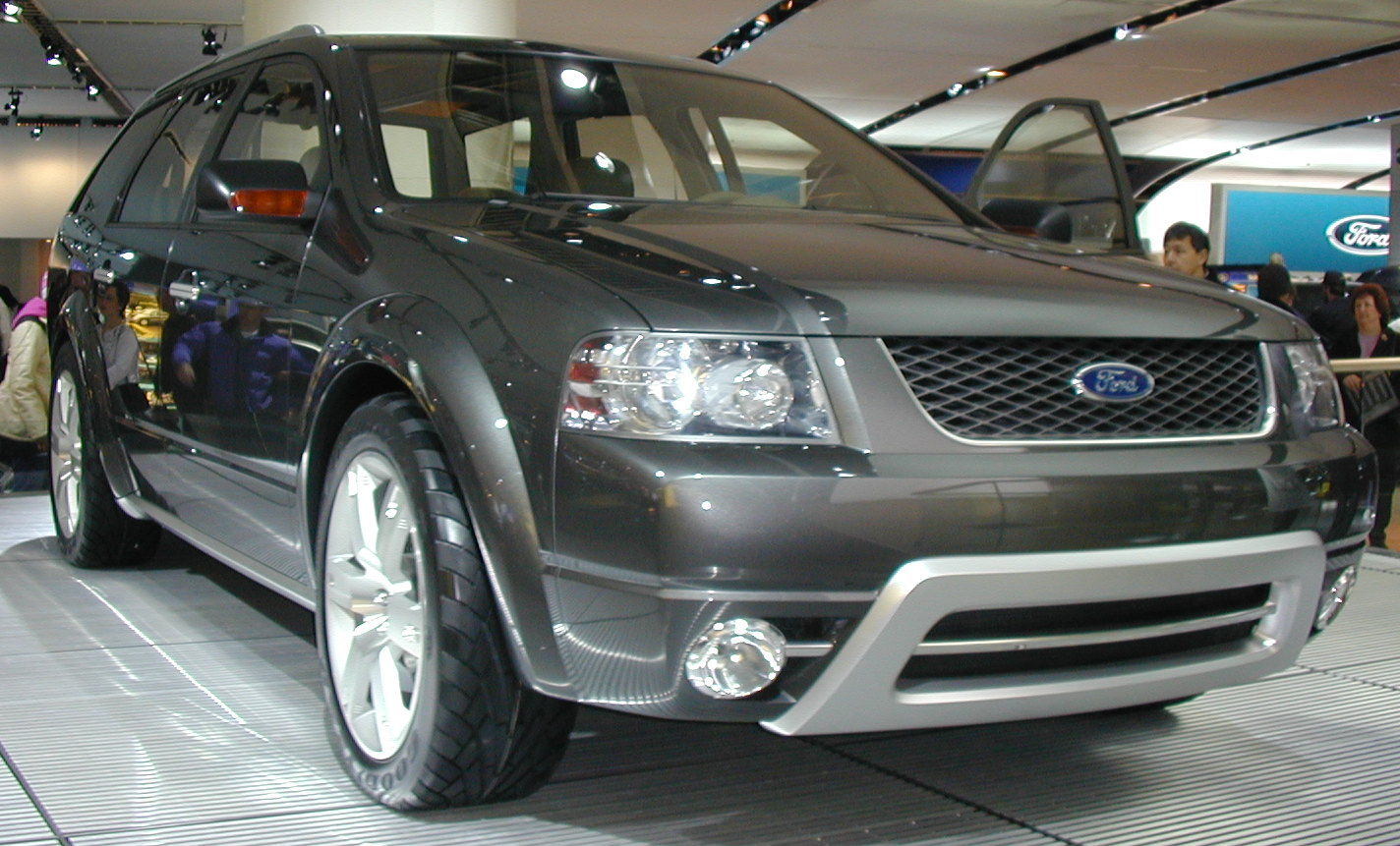
Ford Freestyle FX concept

The Freestyle was previewed at the 2003 Detroit Auto Show with the Freestyle FX Concept before entering production for the 2005 model year. The FX concept featured a unique rear end design that could be converted from a wagon into a pickup truck or sedan, but this feature never made it onto the production version. The vehicle was originally going to be called the Ford CrossTrainer, but had been renamed the Freestyle by the time the concept was released, due to Ford adopting an ill-fated naming scheme in which all Ford-branded passenger cars except the Mustang and Thunderbird would have a name start with the letter "F".

Although its body and chassis was used to produce the Mercury Meta One concept vehicle, no Lincoln-Mercury version of the Freestyle ever reached production.

== Design overview ==
For the Freestyle/Taurus X, Ford used its Volvo-derived D3 platform architecture. Sharing a common platform with the Ford Five Hundred and Mercury Montego, all four vehicles were derived from the Volvo P2 platform used for the first-generation Volvo S80 and Volvo XC90. To accommodate production costs for Ford and durability concerns for North American roads, many revisions were made to the platform, making the final vehicles significantly different. Design-wise, the car itself bore several visual resemblances to the Australian market Ford Territory, especially in the rear third of the car.

Power came from a 3.0 L (181 cu in) Duratec V6, with an output of 203 hp (151 kW) at 5750 rpm. The Freestyle, along with the Five Hundred, Mercury Montego, and the Ford Escape Hybrid, were the first American Ford vehicles to use a continuously variable transmission (CVT). The Freestyle, Five Hundred and Montego used a chain-type CVT, while the Escape Hybrid used a CVT transaxle that utilized a planetary gearset controlled by the electric generator, similar to the Toyota Prius. All Freestyles were equipped with the CVT, but only all-wheel drive (AWD) Five Hundred and Montego models used the CVT (FWD versions used an Aisin F21++ six-speed automatic). 55% of buyers selected the Haldex Traction-equipped all-wheel drive model rather than the expected 40%.

== Model history ==
=== Ford Freestyle (2005–2007) ===
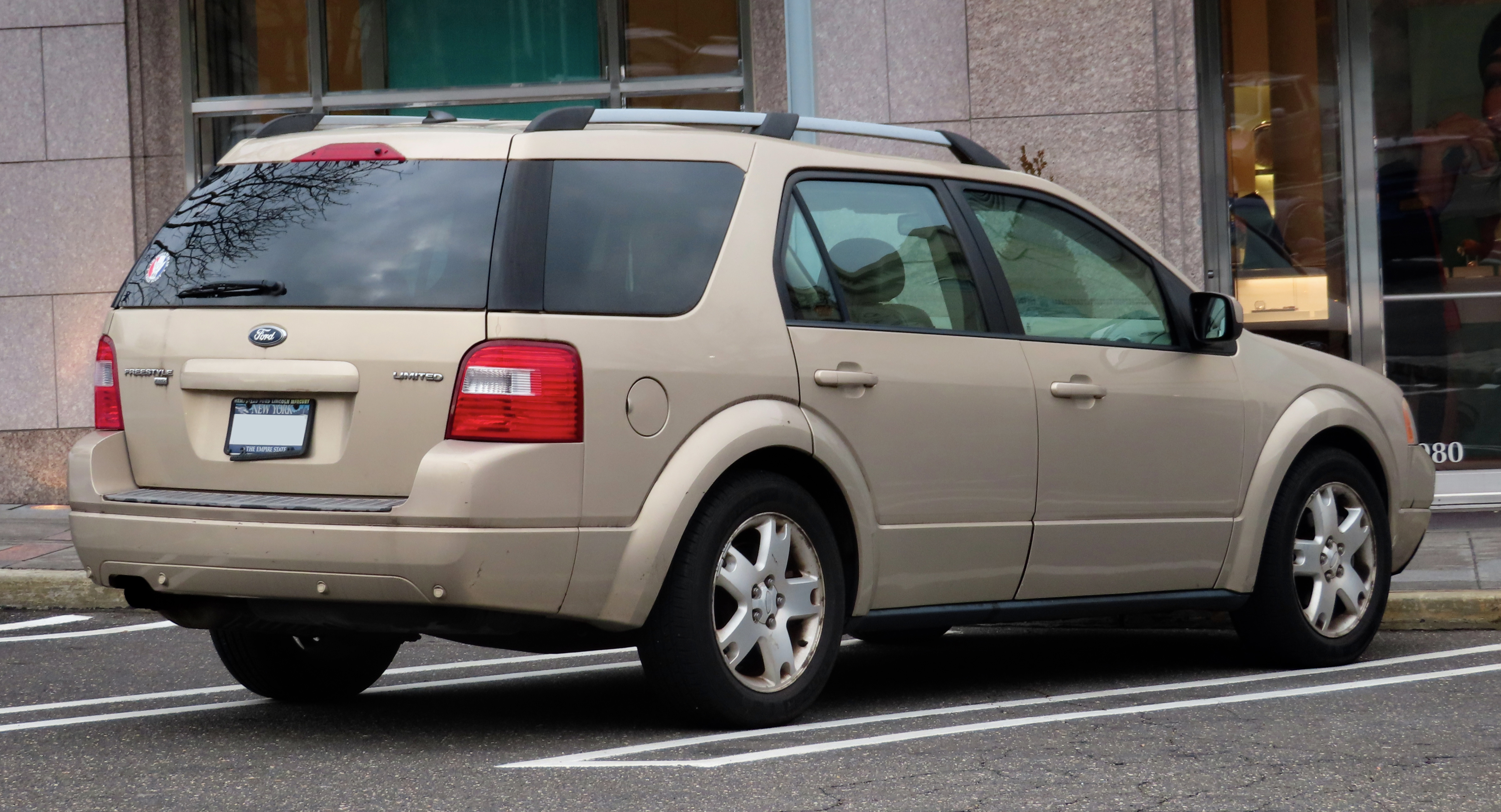
2007 Ford Freestyle Limited

Introduced as a 2005 model largely in place of the Ford Taurus station wagon, the Freestyle was marketed as a crossover utility vehicle, a new market segment at the time. As with the Ford Five Hundred/Mercury Montego, the Freestyle was available with front-wheel drive as standard with all-wheel drive as an option; the CVT of the all-wheel drive Five Hundred was the sole transmission on the Freestyle. The 203 hp 3.0L Duratec V6 was the standard engine.

In contrast to a Taurus station wagon, the Freestyle featured forward-facing third-row seating (similar to the Ford Explorer and Ford Expedition). Although designed with ground clearance between a sedan and a small SUV, the Freestyle featured what Ford marketed as Command Seating, featuring a higher H-point, to increase driver visibility and ease of entry and exit.

The Freestyle was nominated for the North American Truck of the Year award for 2005 (placing second behind the Ford Escape Hybrid).

=== Ford Taurus X (2008–2009) ===
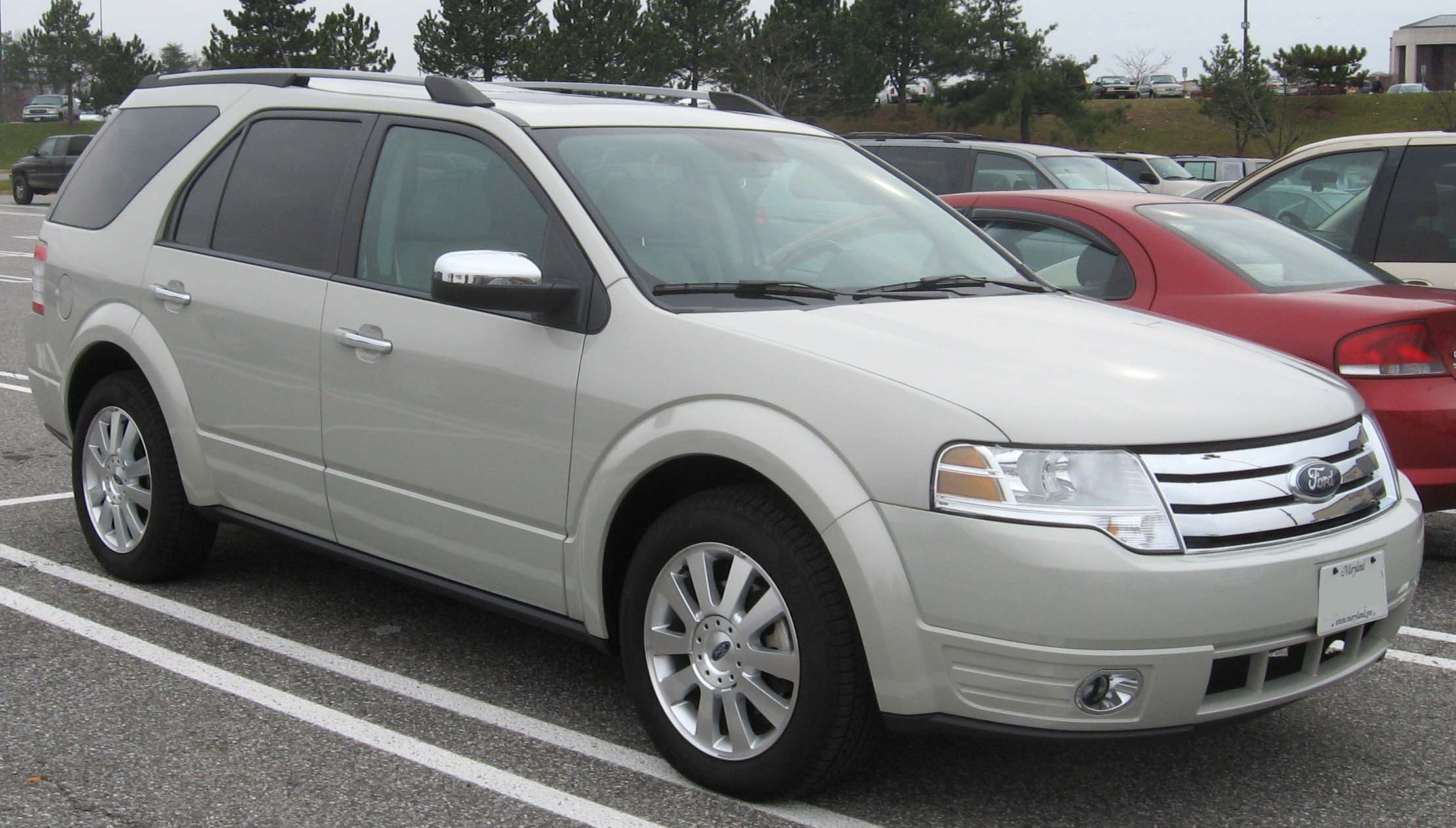

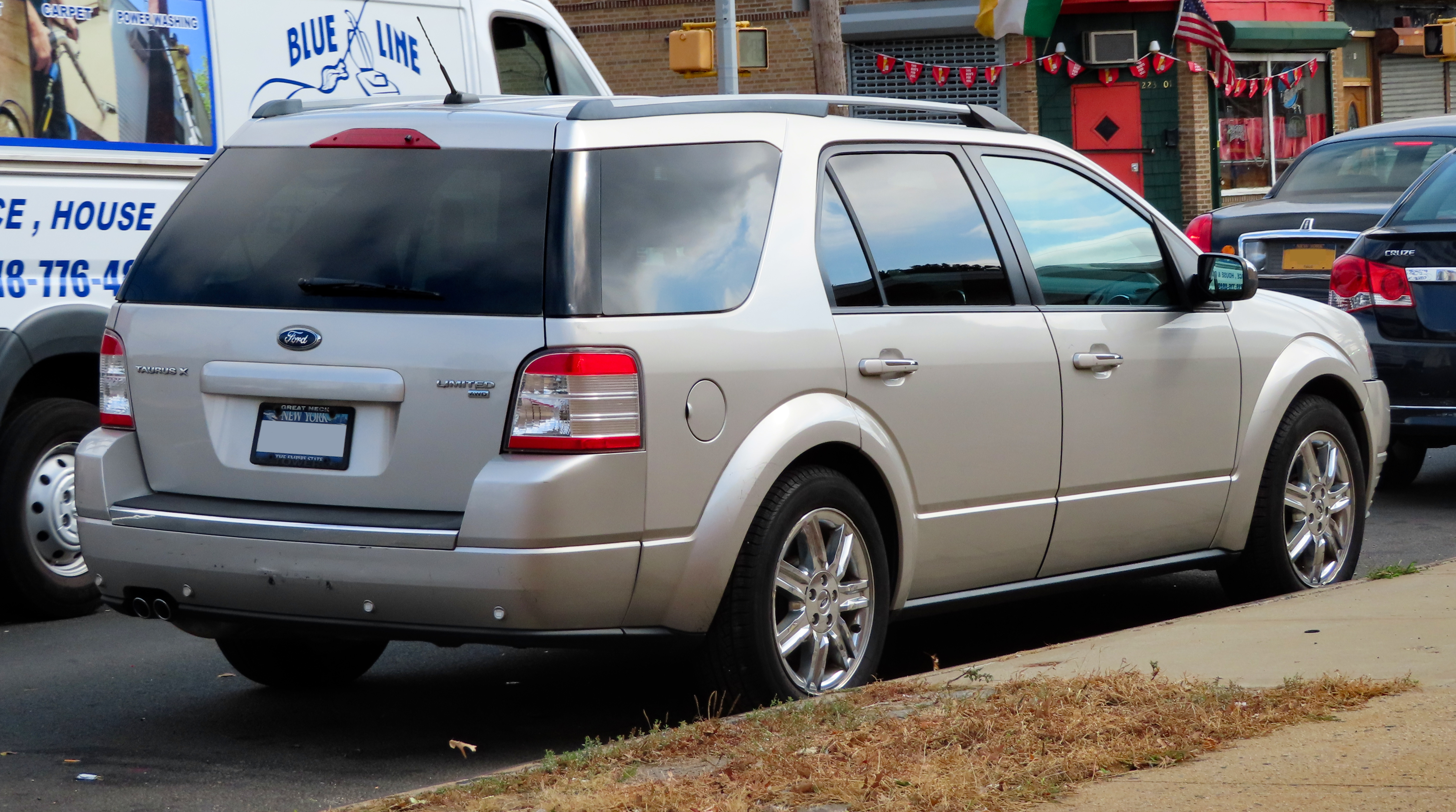
2008 Ford Taurus X Limited

In 2007, shortly after becoming CEO of Ford Motor Company, Alan Mulally called for a revision of the Ford and Mercury model ranges, saying that the shift towards Ford nameplates starting with the letter "F" was forgettable to consumers. He reinstated of the Ford Taurus nameplate for, displacing the sedan's Five Hundred nameplate for a mid-cycle refresh for the 2008 model year and adopting the Taurus X nameplate, superseding the Freestyle nameplate. The change was announced shortly after its unveiling at the 2007 Chicago Auto Show for the 2008 production model.

The Taurus X received a flush-mounted three-bar horizontal chrome grille, and matching the Explorer, the Taurus X introduced an outdoors-themed Eddie Bauer trim level. As with the Freestyle, the lower body and wheel well trim on Eddie Bauer and SEL trim levels were painted in a contrasting color (as with all Ford SUVs); Limited trim models received a monochromatic treatment.

As with its sedan counterpart, the Taurus X featured a major powertrain update over its predecessor. The 203 hp 3.0L V6 was replaced by an all-new 3.5L Duratec 35 V6 engine, raising output to 263 hp. The ZF-Batavia CVT was replaced by an all-new Ford/GM 6-speed automatic transmission, while all-wheel drive remained an option. To increase its functionality, the Taurus X featured new power options, including a power-operated rear liftgate and power-folding second-row seats.

Although the renaming of the Taurus sedan would improve its sales over the Five Hundred, the renaming of the Freestyle to the Taurus X would have the opposite effect, leading to a major decrease in sales. During its production, the Taurus X was partially affected by the automotive industry crisis of 2008–10. Although more fuel-efficient than SUVs such as the V8-engined Ford Expedition and Ford Explorer, full-size crossovers such as the Taurus X were avoided in favor of smaller crossovers and sedans.

In 2009, the Ford Flex was introduced as the replacement for the discontinued Ford Freestar/Mercury Monterey. The Taurus X was discontinued for the 2009 model year, with the Flex unofficially serving as its replacement.

=== Trim levels ===
The 2005–2007 Ford Freestyle, and the 2008–2009 Ford Taurus X, were offered in several different trim levels:

The base SE trim level, only offered on the Freestyle between 2005 and 2006, was the "base" trim level, and offered the following features as standard equipment: a 3.0L "DuraTec" V6 engine, a CVT transmission (Freestyle only) or a 6 speed automatic transmission (Taurus X only), seventeen-inch alloy wheels and tires, an A/M-F/M stereo with a single-disc CD player and a four-speaker audio system, manual front and rear air conditioning with front controls, cloth seating surfaces, power windows, power door locks, keyless entry, an aluminum interior trim piece, black door handles and side mirrors, and matte gray lower body trim.

The SEL was the mid-level trim level between 2005 and 2006, and the base trim level from 2007 until 2009. It added the following options to the base SE trim level: a 3.5L "DuraTec" V6 engine (2008 and 2009 Taurus X only), a six-speed automatic transmission (2008 and 2009 Taurus X only), sport-styled seventeen-inch alloy wheels, a security system, an A/M-F/M stereo with a single-disc CD/MP3 player and an auxiliary audio input jack, dual-zone automatic air conditioning with rear controls, a power front driver's seat, a woodgrain interior trim piece, and either Gray Metallic or Arizona Beige Metallic lower body trim.

The Limited was the top-of-the-line trim level from 2005 until 2009. It added the following options to the mid-level SEL trim level: dual front heated power seats, leather-trimmed first and second-row seating surfaces (the third-row bench seat was vinyl-trimmed), an A/M-F/M stereo with a six-disc, in-dash CD/MP3 changer (later with an auxiliary audio input jack and Ford SYNC) and a premium "Audiophile" seven-speaker audio system with rear-mounted subwoofer and external amplifier, satellite radio, color-keyed exterior door handles and side mirrors, and color-keyed lower body trim.

The Eddie Bauer Edition, only offered on the Taurus X between 2008 and 2009, was the "luxury" trim level, and added the following options to the base SEL trim level: an A/M-F/M stereo with a single-disc CD/MP3 player and an auxiliary audio input jack with Ford SYNC, satellite radio, two-tone leather-trimmed first and second-row seating surfaces (the third-row bench seat was vinyl-trimmed), dual heated power front seats, color-keyed door handles, and Arizona Beige Metallic or Ingot Silver Metallic lower body trim.

== Other versions ==
Since 2005, the Freestyle nameplate has been used as an off-road styling trim for the EcoSport and the Ka in Latin America, the latter also sold as the Ford Freestyle in India and as the Ford Figo Freestyle in South Africa.

== Sales (United States) ==
Calendar Year	Total American sales
2004	Freestyle: 8,509
2005	Freestyle: 76,739
2006	Freestyle: 58,602
2007	Freestyle: 23,765; Taurus X: 18,345
2008	Taurus X: 23,112
2009	Taurus X: 6,106
