= Ford D3 platform =

Ford D3 Platform
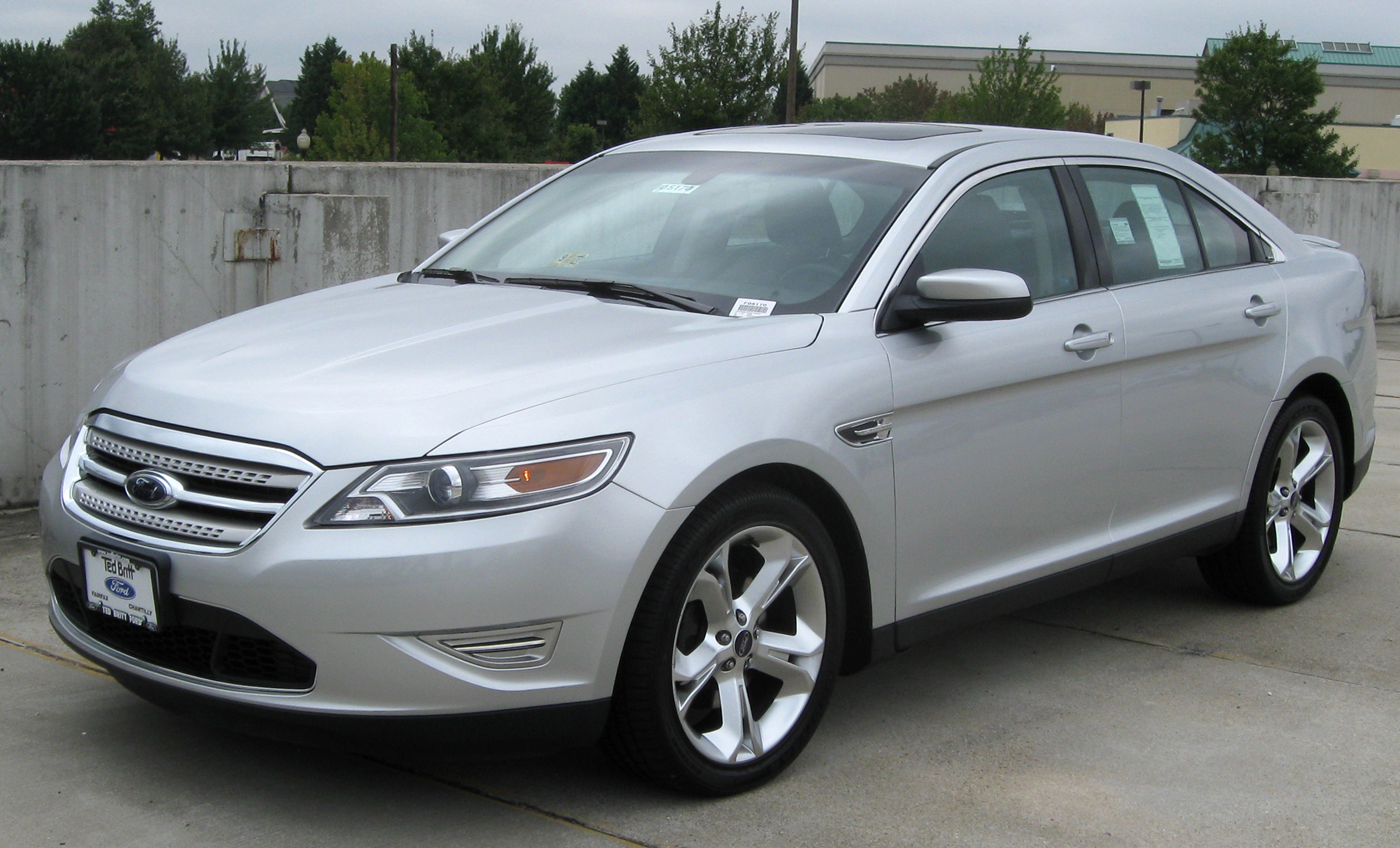
- 2010 Ford Taurus SHO

Overview
- Manufacturer: Ford Motor Company
- Production: 2004–2019
- Assembly: Ford: Chicago, Illinois (Chicago Assembly)

Body and chassis
- Class: Mid-size SUV/Full-size car
- Layout: Transverse Front-wheel drive, all-wheel drive
- Body styles: 4-door Sedan; 5-door Full-size CUV; 5-door Mid-size Crossover SUV
- Vehicles: See listing
- Related: Ford D4 platform Ford CD3 platform Ford EUCD platform Ford V platform]

Dimensions
- Wheelbase: 112.9 inches (D3 sedans)

Chronology
- Predecessor: Ford Panther platform Ford D186 platform Ford DEW platform
- Successor: Ford CD4 platform (Sedan); Ford CD6 platform (SUV)

The Ford D3 platform is an automotive platform used by Ford Motor Company for model years 2005–2019, as the fifteenth generation of full-size North American cars.

The platform used unibody chassis construction with a transverse V6 engine and either front -or all-wheel drive. The platform derived from the 1998–2016 Volvo P2 architecture, relating to a period when Ford owned Volvo as part of its Premier Automotive Group. From model year 2008 on, the related D4 platform served as a basis for crossover SUVs.

While the vehicles of the D3 platform were officially introduced as the replacement for the 1999–2007 D186 platform (Ford Taurus), in terms of market position and interior volume, they effectively superseded the Ford and Mercury vehicles of the 1978–2012 Panther platform.

Between 2004 and 2019, D3 vehicles have been assembled at Chicago Assembly in Chicago, Illinois along with the D4 Ford Explorer. The D4 Ford Flex and Lincoln MKT were assembled at Oakville Assembly in Oakville, Ontario, Canada.

== Overview ==
To achieve a more cost-effective design, the D3 platform rendered certain elements in steel, as with for example the suspension arms in stamped steel vs. cast aluminum.

Ford adopted a common 112.9 wheelbase for its D3 variants, three inches longer than Volvo's platform. Notably, where the Volvo platform used inline five or six cylinder engines, Ford adopted its transverse Duratec V6 engines to the platform — including later Duratec engines compressing their design (e.g., embedding the water pump deeper in the engine) to accommodate the platform. As with the front-drive P2 platform, a Haldex all-wheel drive (shared with the S80/XC90) was optional.

As the first front-wheel drive full-size car platform used by Ford, the D3 platform is also the first full-size Ford car produced with fully independent suspension, with a multi-link rear axle, coilover shocks and MacPherson front struts. The D3 is fitted with four-wheel disc brakes.

=== D4 ===
The D4 platform is a revision of D3 unibody platform used since 2008. Developed to underpin crossover SUVs (including the Ford Flex, Lincoln MKT, and the MY 2011–2019 Ford Explorer), the variant is adaptable to multiple wheelbases; the suspension is also upgraded for off-road driving and towing.

Two variants of the D4 were developed as replacements for Panther-platform vehicles: the Ford Police Interceptor Utility (a police-use version of the Ford Explorer) served as a replacement for the Ford Crown Victoria Police Interceptor; Lincoln introduced limousine, and livery variants of the MKT, replacing similar conversions of the Lincoln Town Car.

== Vehicles ==
Between the 2005 and 2019 model years, the Ford D3 platform has been used by Ford, Lincoln, and the (now-defunct) Mercury brands. Introduced as the Ford Five Hundred and Mercury Montego, which were subsequently re-branded as the fifth-generation Ford Taurus and Mercury Sable for 2008.

For model year 2009 and 2010 respectively, Ford also marketed a Lincoln D3 variant, the MKS and the D3-based sixth-generation Ford Taurus.

After discontinuation of the Mercury brand, the Mercury Sable ended production after the 2009 model year. For 2017, Lincoln replaced the MKS with the revived Lincoln Continental, based on the CD4 architecture.

Vehicle Name	Image	Production	Bodystyle(s)	Model Code	Notes
D3 platform vehicles (Ford, Lincoln-Mercury)
Ford Five Hundred, Ford Taurus		MY 2005–2007 (Five Hundred)	4-door sedan	D258	First front-wheel drive full-size Ford; also sold with all-wheel drive. Five-Hundred re-branded Taurus for MY 2008–2009 with upgraded powertrain.
Ford Five Hundred, Ford Taurus		MY 2008–2009 (Taurus)	4-door sedan	D258	First front-wheel drive full-size Ford; also sold with all-wheel drive. Five-Hundred re-branded Taurus for MY 2008–2009 with upgraded powertrain.
Ford Taurus		2009–2019	4-door sedan		Also branded as Ford Taurus SHO and Ford Police Interceptor Sedan.
Ford Freestyle Ford Taurus X		MY 2005–2007 (Freestyle)	5-door crossover SUV	D219	Replaced Ford Taurus station wagon Freestyle re-branded as 2008 Taurus X in 2007 with upgraded powertrain.
Ford Freestyle Ford Taurus X		MY 2008–2009 (Taurus X)	5-door crossover SUV	D219	Replaced Ford Taurus station wagon Freestyle re-branded as 2008 Taurus X in 2007 with upgraded powertrain.
Mercury Montego, Mercury Sable		2004–2007 (Montego)	4-door sedan	D333	First front-wheel drive full-size Mercury; also sold with all-wheel drive. Rebranded as Sable for 2008 with upgraded powertrain.
Mercury Montego, Mercury Sable		2007–2009 (Sable)	4-door sedan	D333	First front-wheel drive full-size Mercury; also sold with all-wheel drive. Rebranded as Sable for 2008 with upgraded powertrain.
Lincoln MKS		MY 2009–2016	4-door sedan	D385	Replaced by 2017 Lincoln Continental (CD4) Only Lincoln version of D3 sedan platform.
D4-platform vehicles (Ford, Lincoln)
Ford Flex		2008–2019	5-door crossover SUV	D471	Replaced Ford Taurus X.
Lincoln MKT		2009–2019	5-door crossover SUV	D472	Livery version branded as MKT Town Car.
Ford Explorer		2010–2019	5-door crossover SUV	U502	First version of the Explorer built with unibody construction. Also branded as Ford Police Interceptor Utility.

=== Concept cars ===
- 2005 Mercury Meta One diesel-electric hybrid crossover SUV
- 2008 Lincoln MKT luxury crossover SUV not to be confused with the production car of the same name that is on a modified version of the D3 platform known as D4.
