= Mercury Meta One =

Concept car

Overview
- Type: Concept car
- Manufacturer: Mercury (Ford)
- Production: 2005 (1 concept car)

Body and chassis
- Class: Luxury crossover SUV
- Body style: 5-door SUV
- Layout: FF layout
- Platform: Ford D3 platform
- Related: Ford Freestyle

Powertrain
- Engine: 2.7L AJD twin-turbocharged diesel V6
- Transmission: Ford/ZF CVT

Dimensions
- Wheelbase: 112.9 in (2,868 mm)
- Length: 199.8 in (5,075 mm)
- Width: 73.0 in (1,854 mm)
- Curb weight: 4,251 lb (1,928 kg)

The Mercury Meta One was a concept car that was created by Mercury. A four-door crossover sport-utility vehicle, the Meta One made its debut at the 2005 North American International Auto Show in Detroit, Michigan. The Meta One was notable for being the first concept vehicle designed with a PZEV diesel-hybrid powertrain.

== Design ==
Loosely based upon the body of the production Ford Freestyle, the Mercury Meta One was a luxury crossover SUV with four seats. Serving as a testbed for in-vehicle technology, the Meta One featured an always-on Wi-Fi connection; along with the ability to connect handheld devices and the built in Sirius Satellite Radio, it also allowed the on-board navigation system to deliver real-time updates for traffic and route conditions. Instead of a traditional instrument panel, the vehicle featured multiple computer displays that were reconfigurable to fit driver needs. A special design for the smart key allowed it to double as a PDA, allowing it to also store emergency contacts.

In collaboration with Volvo, the Mercury Meta One was designed with a number of safety technologies unseen on a production Ford Motor Company vehicle. These included lane departure control and collision mitigation by pre-charging the brakes if an on-board camera and radar sensor senses the likelihood of an accident.

== Powertrain ==
The Mercury Meta One was powered by a 248 hp twin-turbocharged diesel V6; the 2.7L engine was sourced from the Australian Ford Territory (sized similar to the Freestyle) and the Land Rover Discovery product lines. Coupled with the continuously variable transmission (as used in the Freestyle) was an electric motor, providing start-stop technology to increase fuel economy. The combined torque output of the powertrain was 431 lb⋅ft (584 N⋅m) ; it was 97% cleaner than the Tier I emissions standard for NOx .

While the technology has not been applied to diesel engines, the Ford EcoBoost family of gasoline engines has utilized turbocharging in the same manner in the effort to lower emissions while increasing power. In place of a traditional V8 engine, the Ford Taurus SHO and Lincoln MKS utilize a 365 hp twin-turbocharged V6.

== Fate ==
Although sharing the architecture of the Ford Freestyle, the Meta One was never released as a production vehicle. In late 2006, during the development of the Ford Taurus X, prototype development mules were spotted using front bodywork of Meta One prototypes, leading to speculation that the Mercury division would be given a production form of the Meta One, possibly named either the Mercury Monticello or Mercury Magellan.

As with its Ford Freestyle predecessor, the Ford Taurus X reached production without a Mercury (or Lincoln) counterpart.

The Meta One's current location, or if it still exists, is currently unknown.
