= Ford Taurus (fourth generation) =

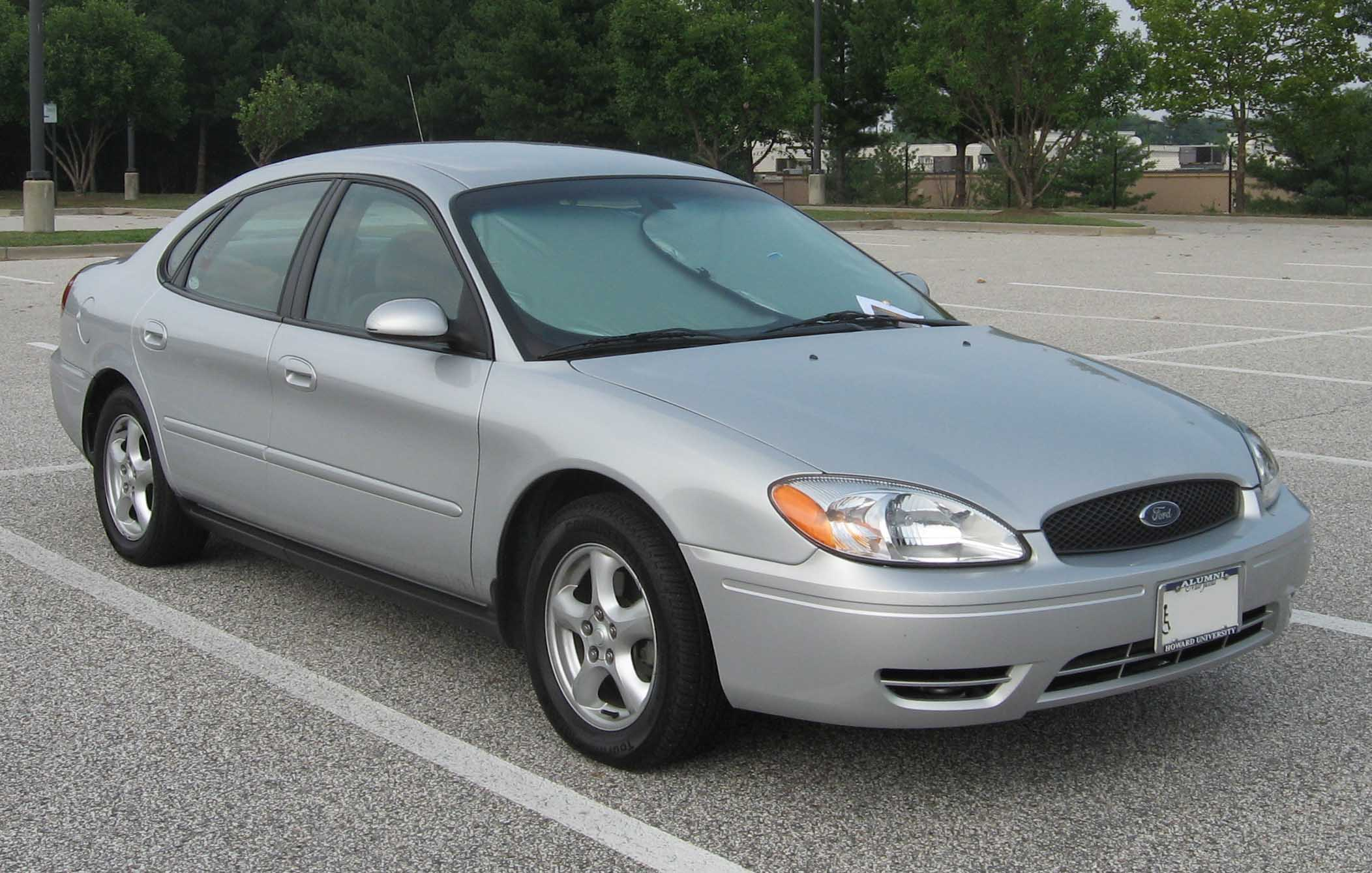

Overview
- Manufacturer: Ford
- Production: October 1999–October 27, 2006
- Model years: 2000–2007 (2007: fleet sales only)
- Assembly: Atlanta Assembly, Hapeville, Georgia, United States; Chicago Assembly, Chicago, Illinois, United States
- Designer: Moray Callum (1996)

Body and chassis
- Class: Mid-size car
- Body style: 4-door sedan 5-door station wagon
- Layout: FF layout
- Platform: Ford D186 platform
- Related: Mercury Sable; Lincoln Continental

Powertrain
- Engine: 3.0 L SFI Vulcan V6 (gasoline / E85); 3.0 L DOHC Duratec 30 V6 (gasoline)
- Transmission: 4-speed AX4N automatic 4-speed AX4S automatic

Dimensions
- Wheelbase: 108.5 in (2,756 mm)
- Length: Sedan: 197.6 in (5,019 mm); Station wagon: 197.7 in (5,022 mm)
- Width: 73.0 in (1,854 mm)
- Height: Sedan: 56.1 in (1,425 mm); Station wagon: 57.8 in (1,468 mm)
- Curb weight: 3,316 lb (1,504 kg)

Chronology
- Predecessor: Ford Taurus (third generation)
- Successor: Ford Five Hundred; Ford Freestyle/Taurus X (station wagon); Ford Fusion

The fourth-generation Ford Taurus is an automobile that was produced by Ford for the 2000 to 2007 model years. While mechanically similar to its predecessor, major revisions to the bodyshell of the sedan were done to alter its controversial styling as well as add interior room; it was available in four-door sedan and five-door station wagon models.

The fourth-generation Taurus would be the final one derived from the original 1986 model line. In 2004 and 2005, as part of its effort to increase the use of globally sourced platforms, Ford introduced the Volvo-developed Five Hundred and Mazda-developed Fusion to fill the slot of the Taurus in the Ford line (for non-fleet buyers, the Five Hundred also served as a replacement for the Crown Victoria).

The Taurus nameplate returned in 2008, as Ford renamed the Five Hundred to increase its sales.

== Overview ==
=== Exterior ===
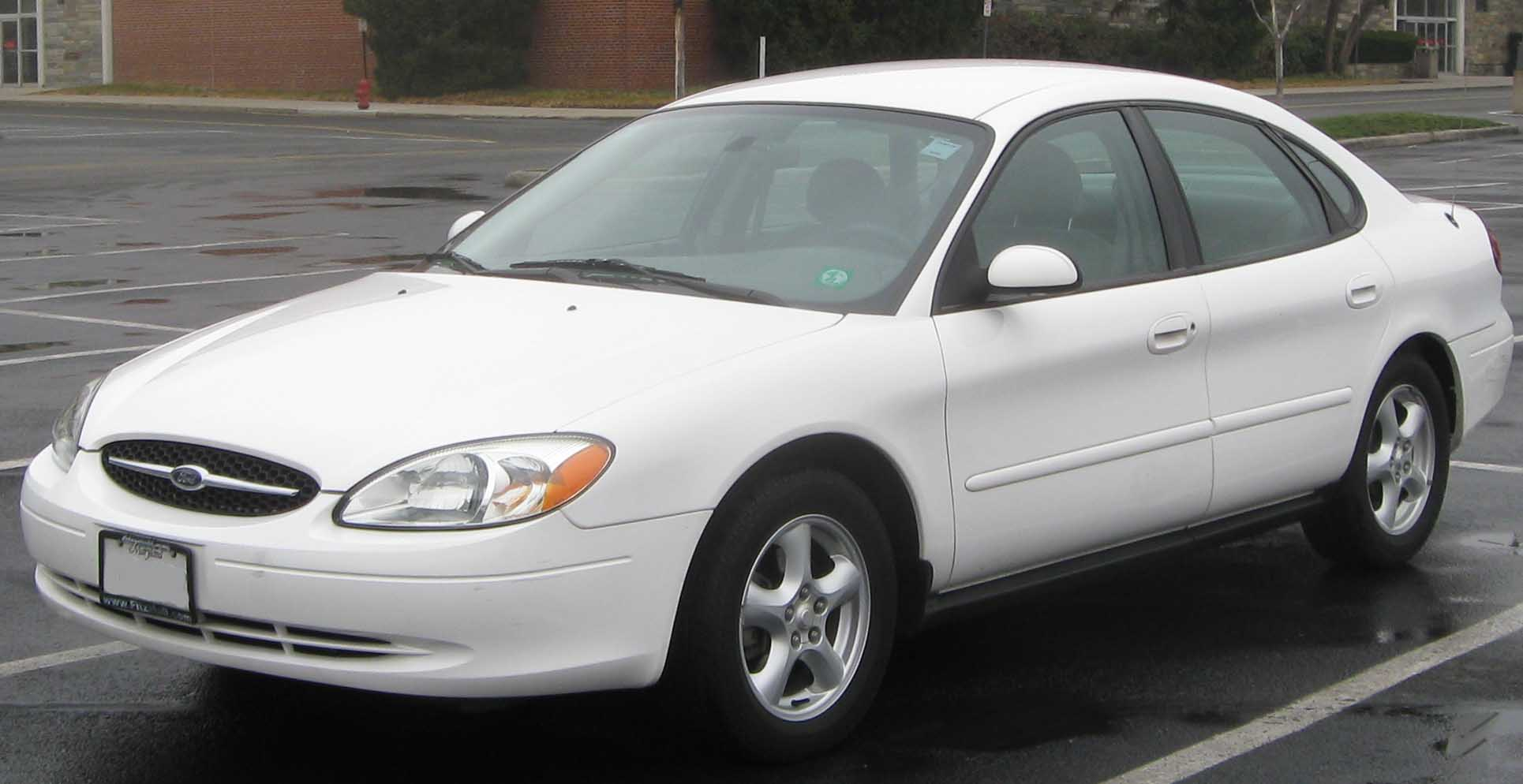
2000–2003 Ford Taurus SES sedan

When Ford introduced the third-generation Taurus, its styling and heavy reliance on ovoid elements became a point of criticism and controversy, strongly limited the car's appeal. As a result, for the fourth generation Taurus, Ford designed it with a more subdued, angular design, as part of Ford's New Edge styling, in hopes of increasing the car's appeal. Instead of sloping back, this car's trunk stood upright in a more traditional shape, which greatly increased trunk space. The roof was also raised into a more upright stance to increase headroom, which can be seen by the thicker C-pillar and larger area between the tops of the doors and the top of the roof.

The front and rear clips were also redesigned on the Taurus and Sable sedans; all body panels were brand-new except the doors. Station wagons received the new front clips but from the firewall back they were essentially the same as the 1996-1999 wagons. The Taurus now had the turn signals integrated into the headlamps, similar to that of the previous generation Sable. The front bumper was also redesigned to include a larger front grille which, like the previous generation, contained a chrome bar running through the middle containing the Ford logo. The rear clip was redesigned with a larger trunk and trunklid, as mentioned above, as well as giving the Taurus two large taillights as opposed to the rear lightbar used in the previous generation cars. Mounted on the trunklid was a large chrome bar containing the Ford logo, like in the front. In 2003 for the 2004 model year, the front clip was slightly redesigned, and the Taurus got a new front bumper and grille. The grille was made smaller, with the chrome bar removed, replaced by just a large Ford logo in the center. The taillights were slightly redesigned, originally to include amber turn signals, but this was cancelled at the eleventh hour. Instead, the rear was given larger reverse lights, and the chrome bar above the license plate bracket was deleted.

=== Interior ===
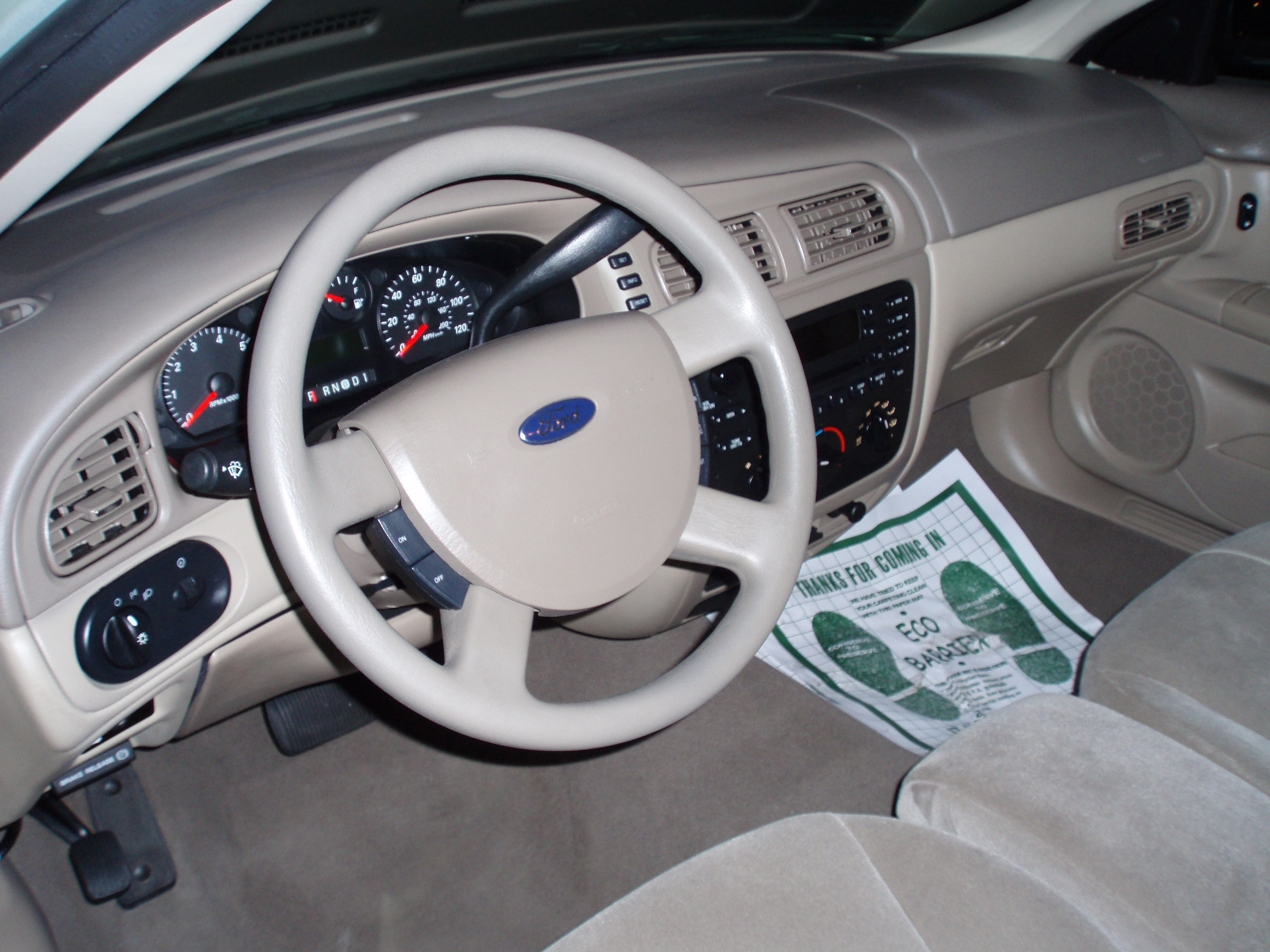
2005 Ford Taurus SE interior

As with the exterior, the interior was completely redesigned with a more conservative style, although some features from the previous cars were carried over. The dashboard had a more linear appearance, instead of curving around the driver. The "Integrated Control Panel" was carried over but enlarged, reshaped, and placed in the center of the dash instead of being tilted toward the driver. The Flip-Fold center console was also carried over but it was revamped as well. When folded out, it now rested against the floor instead of the dashboard, and had different cupholders and storage areas. Unlike previous Tauruses, this one offered rear cupholders that either slid or folded out of the front console, depending on which console the car was equipped with.

This Taurus' interior was available in two configurations; a front bench seat with a column-mounted shifter and the Flip-Fold center console, or bucket seats with a traditional console and a floor-mounted shifter. The configuration for a steering column-mounted shifter and a center console, which made a brief return for 1999, had been dropped. The interior also contained many new safety features; side airbags, tether straps, and a glow in the dark trunk release mounted inside of the trunk. This interior also contained a new system which Ford called the " Advanced Personal Safety System". This system, at the time of a collision, would detect the driver and passenger's positions as well as seatbelt usage, and would inflate the airbags to match, possibly preventing airbag-related injuries. For 2004, the interior got a minor revision. This included a new steering wheel with a center airbag pad that was shaped like an upside-down taco and new gauges with a diagnostic center that would tell if there were any problems with the car, as well as average fuel economy, replacing the outdated analog odometer. It also was able to perform a "system check" at the driver's request to make sure that the engine was functioning properly.

=== Models and engines ===
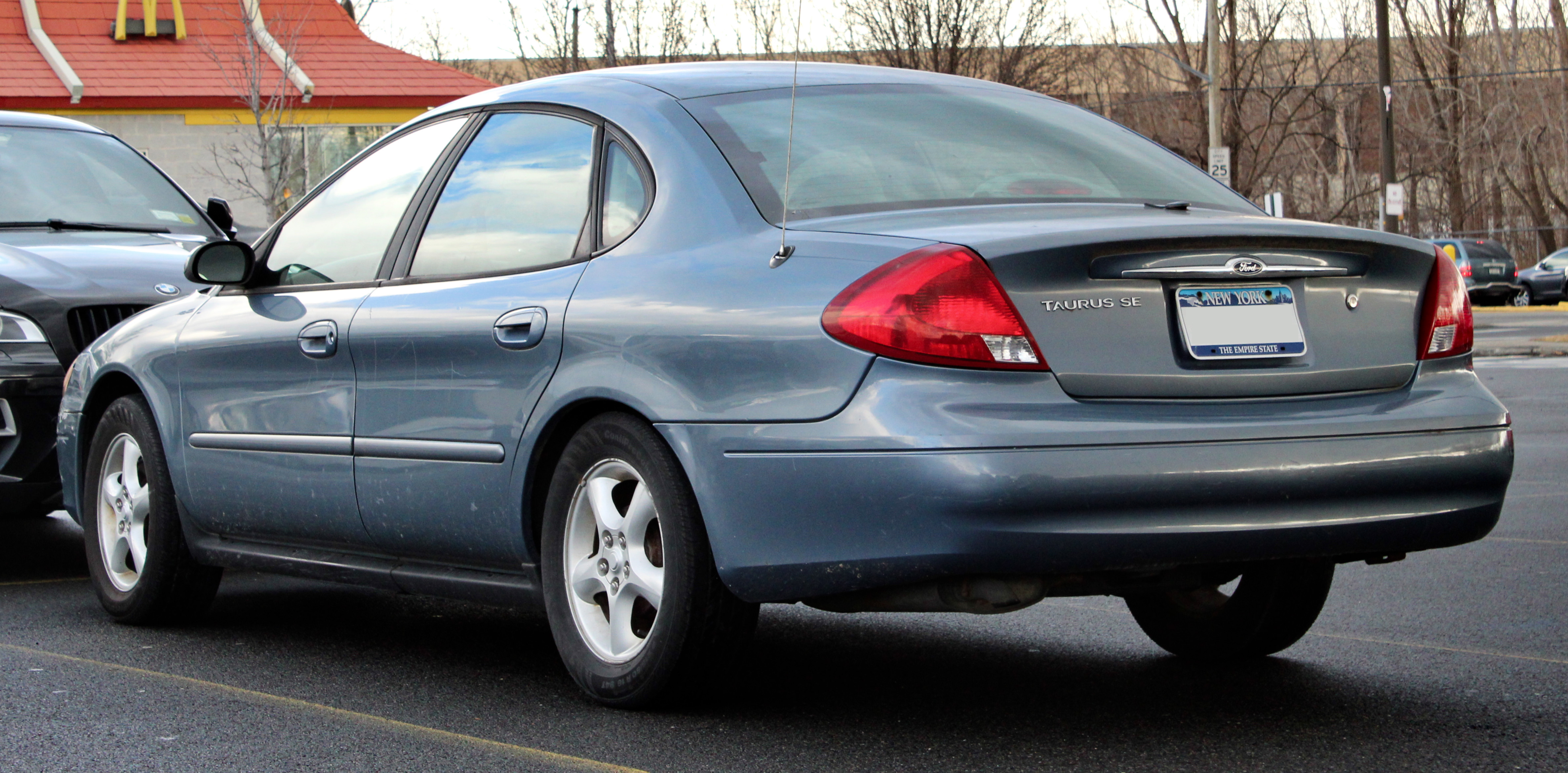
2000-2003 Ford Taurus rear view

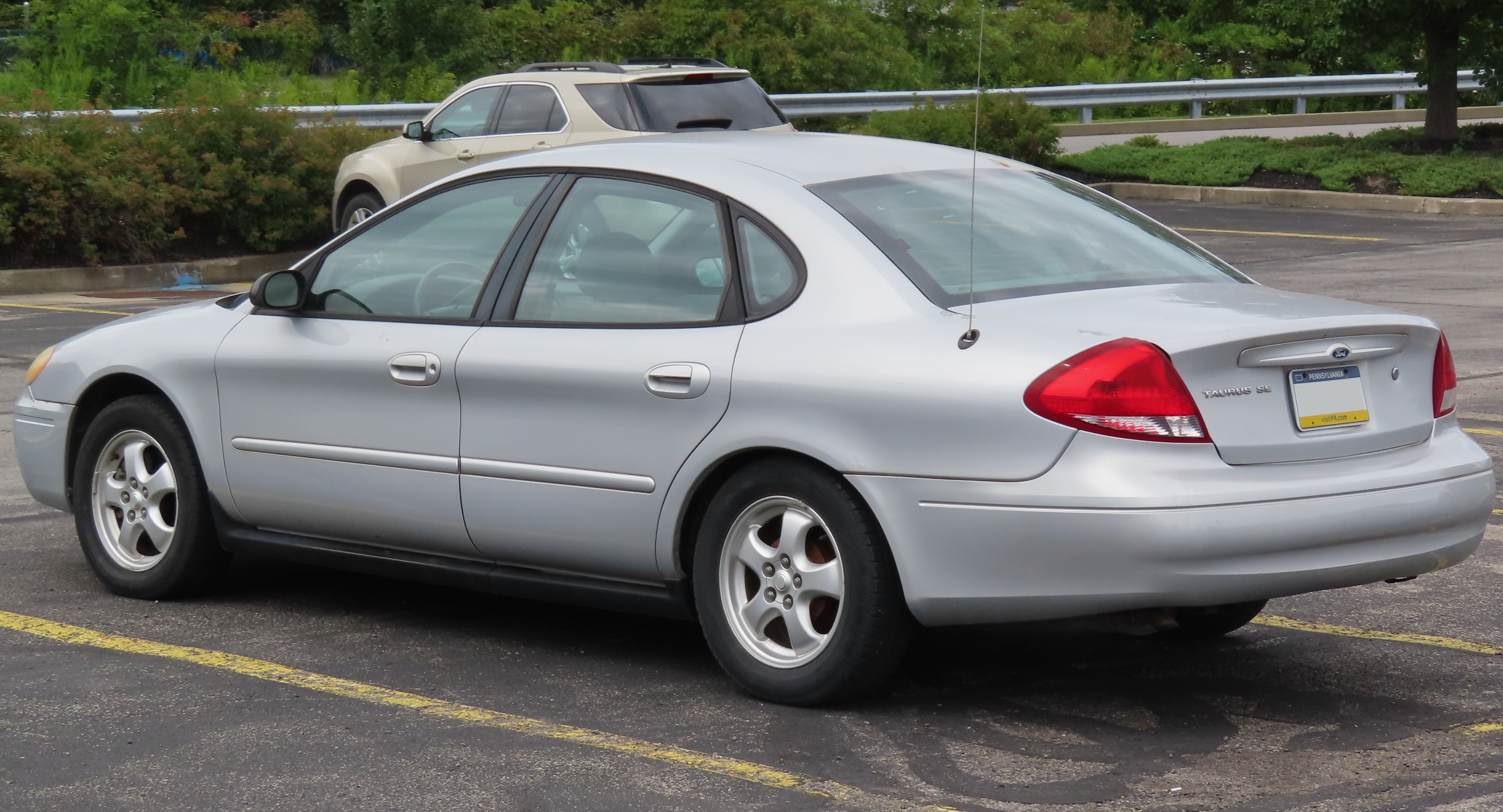
2004 Ford Taurus sedan

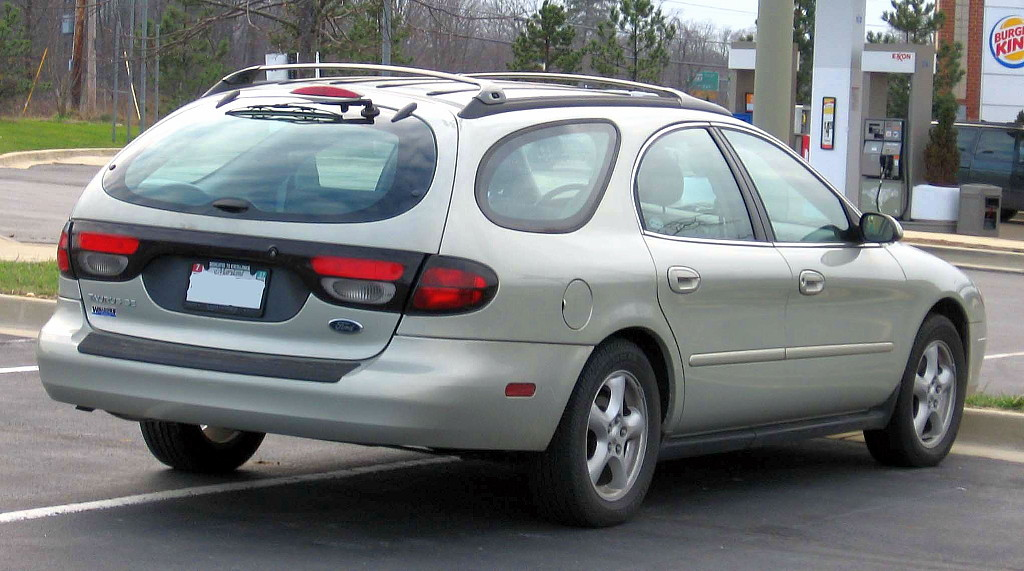
2000–2003 Ford Taurus wagon

The two 1999 models were carried over, and two more were added. The most basic model was the LX, with the SE as the mid priced model. Two new trim levels were offered for 2000: the SE Special Value Group and the top-end model SE Comfort. These new trim levels were renamed the following year to SES and SEL respectively. The SES and LX models were dropped in 2005, leaving the SE and SEL.

The SEL line received a few upgrades for 2003, to give it a more upscale image. Among the changes were a new instrument cluster, wheels, as well as a slight redesign of the dash, with woodgrain replacing the black trim. It also got woodgrain on the steering wheel rim and around the power window switches on the front doors. Also in 2003, Ford created a Centennial Edition Taurus to celebrate Ford's 100th anniversary. This special Taurus included many extras, such as lighter wood trim, special leather seats, headlights with black accents, special wheels, a special leather case for the owner's manual, a leather jacket that said "Ford: 100 Years", a similar watch, and a letter from William Clay Ford, Jr. Production was limited to 4,000 units.

For 2002, 2003 and 2004, the SES model received a "Sport" package, which consisted of five-spoked rims known as "slicers", and the Duratec engine standard. In addition, the exterior of the vehicle received Sport badging on the front quarter-panels, the chrome bar on the grille was changed to body color, the interior received two-toned cloth seats, a two-toned dash applique, special "Sport" floor mats, and a leather-wrapped steering wheel. This model was only offered in four colors.

The engines were carried over from the previous generation, with the Vulcan being the only available engine on the LX and SE, producing 155 horsepower (116 kW) and 185 lb⋅ft (251 N⋅m) of torque, and as the base engine on the SES. The Duratec engine was optional on the SES and standard on the SEL, producing 200 hp (149 kW). For 2005, with the LX and SES models being dropped, the Duratec was only available on the SEL, and in 2006 the Duratec was dropped altogether, with the Vulcan becoming the standard and only engine available on the SEL. Some pre-2004 Vulcans were mated to the four speed AX4S automatic transmission; all other Tauruses of this generation received the AX4N transmission.

== Variants ==
=== Mercury Sable ===
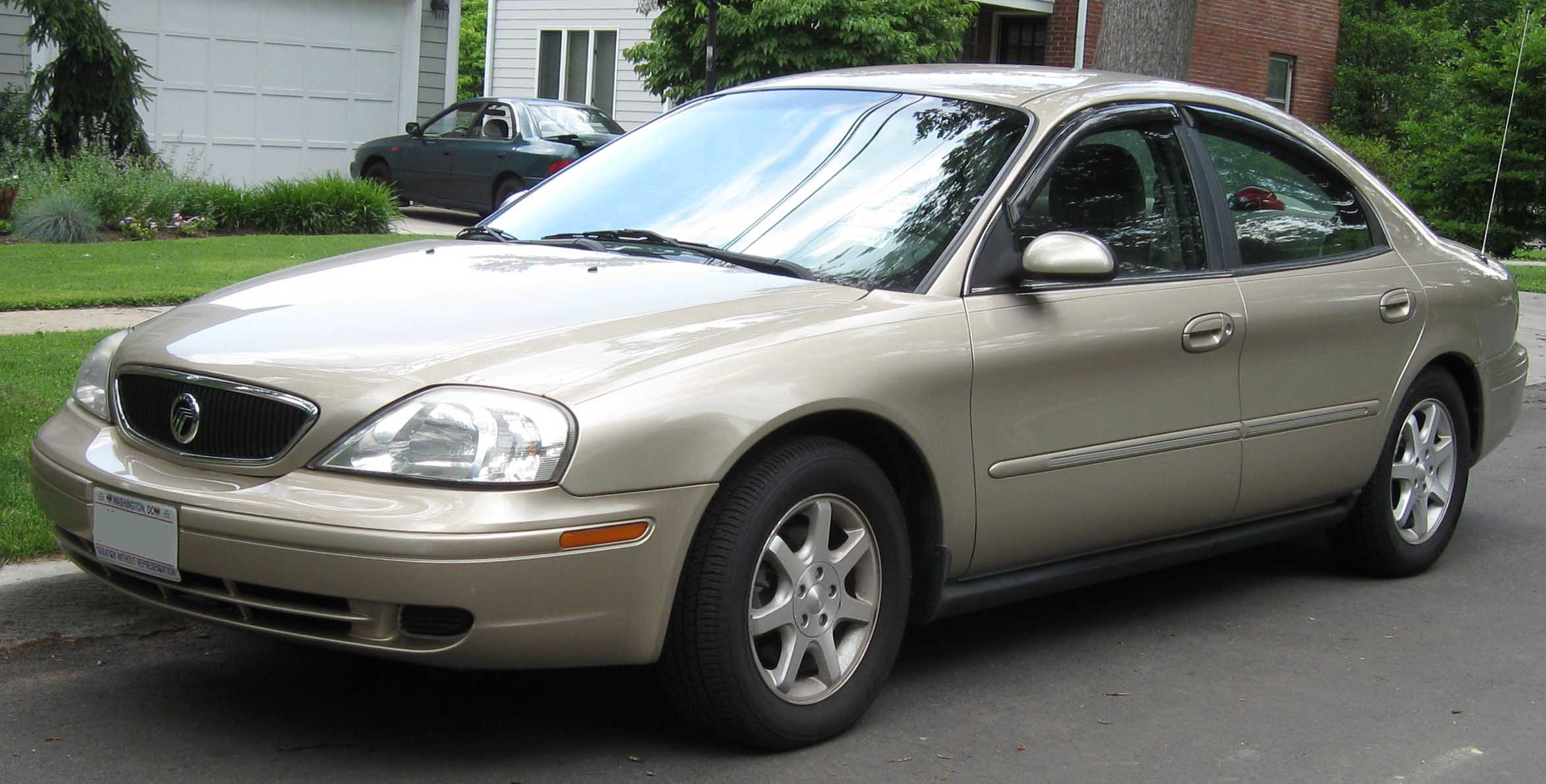
2000–2003 Mercury Sable

The Mercury Sable, the sister model of the Taurus aimed at a more upscale audience, was also redesigned for 2000. Like with previous generations, the Sable shared all mechanical components with the Taurus with a unique body. The new Sable was also largely carried over from the previous model, with changes limited a new front fascia, rear fascia, wheels, a taller roof and trunk, and a new interior, though the interior was the same design of the Taurus with added woodgrain trim. Like with previous generations, the Sable offered the same powertrains and equipment as the Taurus. The Sable was again offered in GS and LS models in wagon and sedan body styles, with a new top-of-the-line LS Premium trim. An LS Platinum edition was also briefly offered. The Sable was updated in 2004 with a new grille, front bumper, steering wheel, instrument cluster, wheels and tail lamps. The Sable was discontinued in 2005 and replaced by the Mercury Montego (which would be renamed as the Sable in 2008) and Mercury Milan. This generation of Sable was not sold in Canada, as the Mercury nameplate had been discontinued there by the 2000 model year.

== Initial discontinuation and nameplate revival ==
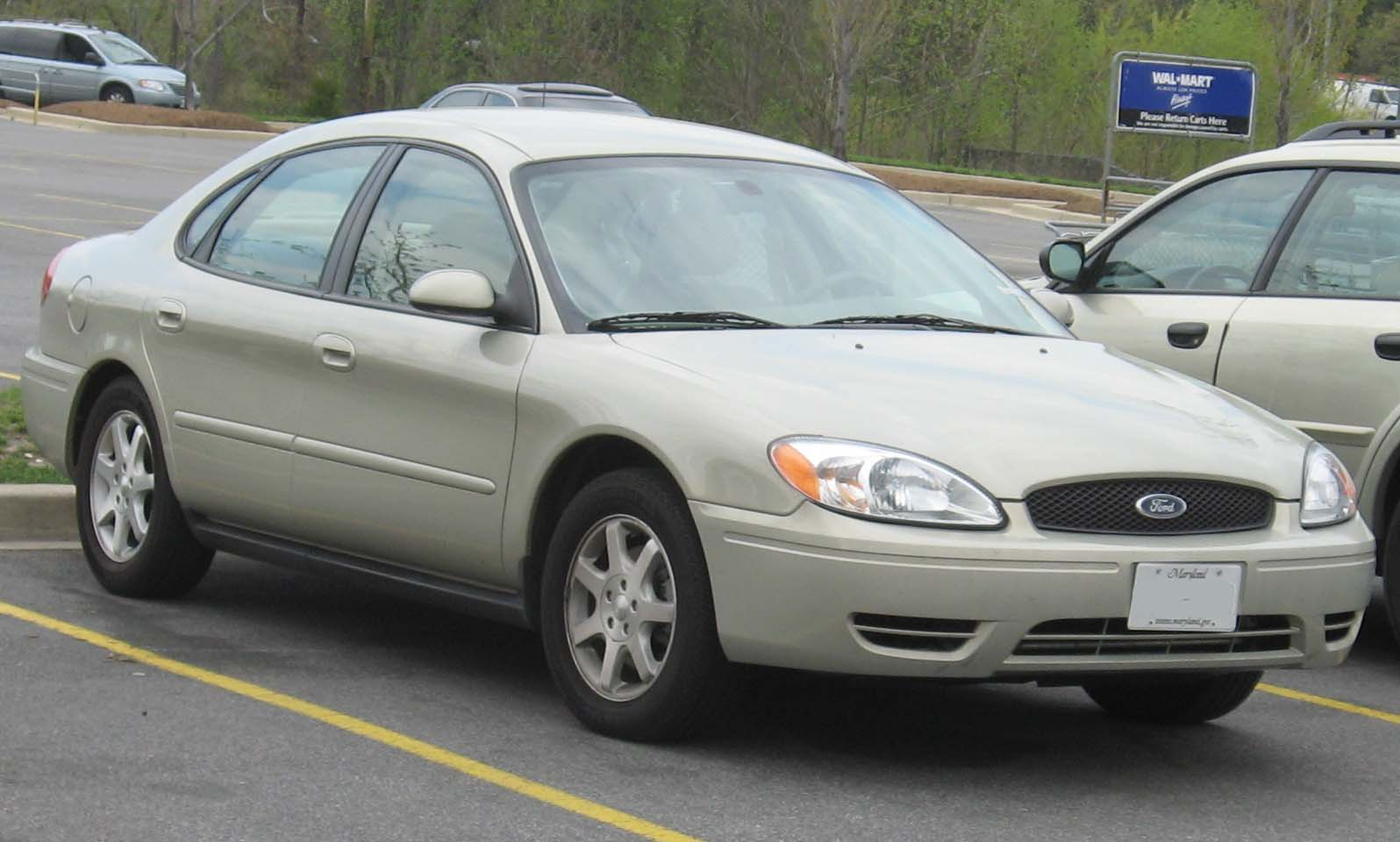
The last Taurus sedan was an SEL model like this one.

This generation of Taurus saw a significant sales slump compared to its predecessors. Having already lost its status as the best selling car in America when it was surpassed by the Honda Accord and Toyota Camry in 1997, by 2005 it was no longer in the top ten in sales. Production of the Taurus wagon was discontinued on December 8, 2004; sedan retail sales halted after a short 2006 model year, and the Taurus became sold exclusively to fleets in the United States, while still being sold to retail customers in Canada. Production ended on October 27, 2006, as Ford idled the Atlanta plant, as part of its "The Way Forward" restructuring plan. The last Ford Taurus rolled off the assembly line around 7:00am, destined for delivery to S. Truett Cathy, owner of Chick-fil-A. Mr. Cathy's original restaurant was located across from the Ford Atlanta plant. There was no official event or function of any kind to mark the end of production. The Taurus was replaced in Ford's lineup by the Five Hundred and Fusion sedans, while the Taurus wagon was replaced by the Freestyle crossover SUV.

How can it go away? It's the best selling car in America.

— Alan Mulally, 2006

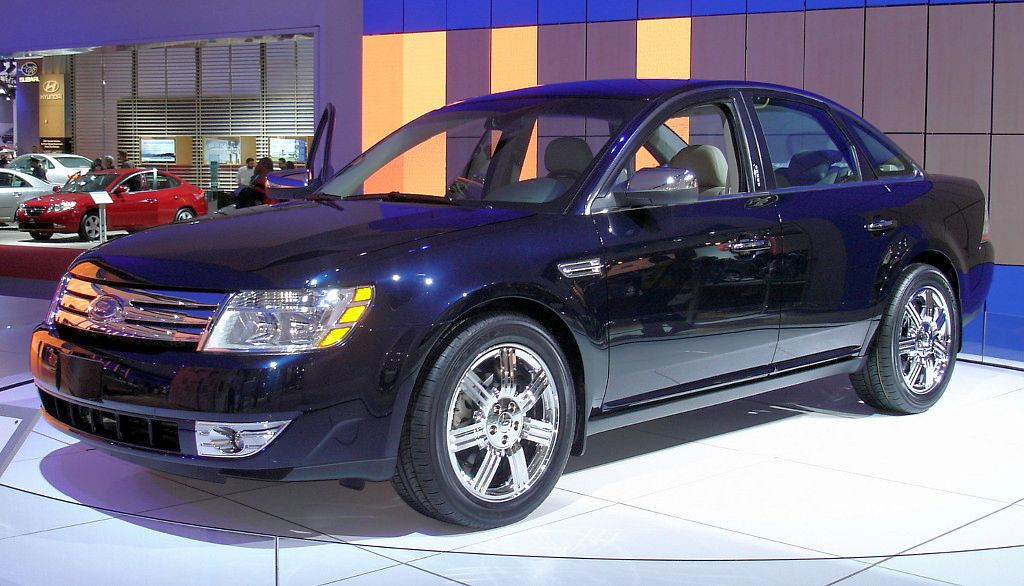
The 2008 Ford Five Hundred prototype, which was renamed "Taurus" upon Alan Mulally's request

The discontinuation of the Taurus sparked debate given its once-strong position in the market and Ford's well-publicized financial problems at the time. Analysts, customers and some interviewed Ford employees criticized the company for failing to invest in the car and keep it competitive, instead focusing all of its resources on developing and marketing trucks and SUVs. A USA Today editorial entitled "How Ford starved its Taurus" noted that the Taurus' death was part of a broader trend of the Detroit Big Three willingly abandoning once-successful products and divisions in search of "the next big thing", while their foreign competitors have been gaining market share by continuously improving their core products. This criticism was echoed by Autoblog, which held the Taurus up as an example of how Ford abandoned its successful products to chase emerging trends to varying degrees of success, a practice they blamed for Ford's struggles at the time. The Truth About Cars similarly lamented how Ford neglected the Taurus to the point where it became a "rental car".

Newly-hired Ford CEO Alan Mulally expressed similar opinions, telling the Associated Press the decision "perplexed" him when he learned about it; he recalled asking subordinates, "How can it go away? It's the best selling car in America!" As the successor Five Hundred was struggling in the marketplace, Mulally viewed the decision to discontinue the Taurus as a "mistake that needed to be fixed", noting, "The customers want it back. They didn’t want it to go away. They wanted us to keep improving it." At the time, Ford had already unveiled a face-lifted Five Hundred at the 2007 North American International Auto Show, which had revised styling and a more powerful engine. Partially blaming the Five Hundred's struggles on its name, Mulally decided that the revised vehicle should be marketed as the Taurus, the name he believed the Five Hundred sedan should have used from the beginning as he believed Ford was better off continuing to use its older nameplates that maintained decent brand equity rather than trying to build up new ones. The revised Five Hundred and Freestyle were showcased as the Taurus and Taurus X, respectively, at the 2007 Chicago Auto Show and went on sale that summer.
