= Ford Five Hundred =

Full-size sedan by Ford (2005–2007)

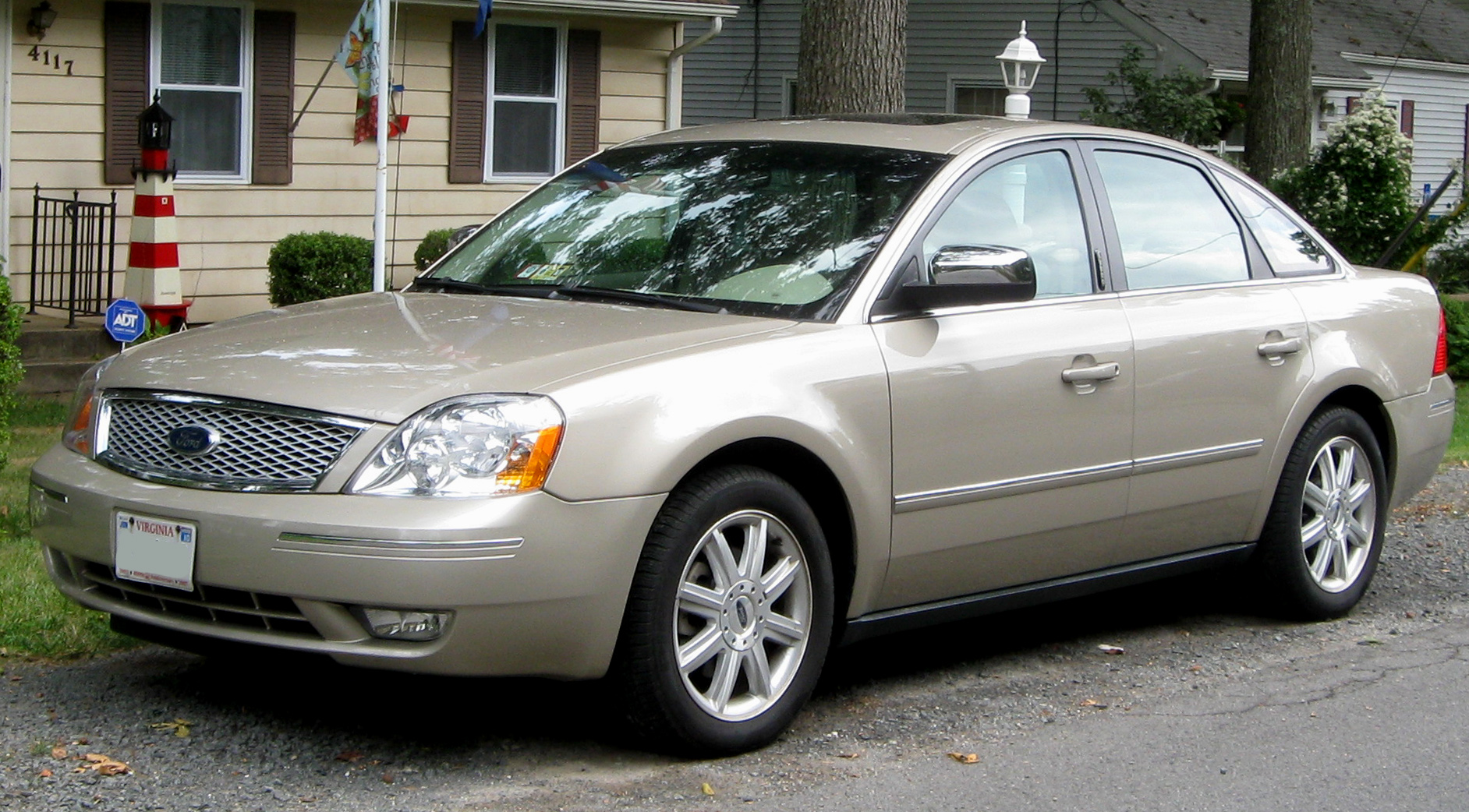
- 2005 Ford Five Hundred

Overview
- Manufacturer: Ford
- Production: July 2004 – April 2007
- Model years: 2005–2007
- Assembly: United States: Chicago, Illinois (Chicago Assembly)
- Designer: George Bucher (2001); J Mays; Jan Vulcan, Chief Engineer

Body and chassis
- Class: Full-size car
- Body style: 4-door sedan
- Layout: Transverse, FF layout / F4 layout
- Platform: Ford D3 platform
- Related: Mercury Montego; Mercury Sable (fifth generation); Ford Taurus (fifth generation)

Powertrain
- Engine: 3.0 L Duratec 30 V6
- Transmission: ZF Batavia CFT30 CVT; 6-speed Aisin F21 automatic

Dimensions
- Wheelbase: 112.9 in (2,868 mm)
- Length: 200.7 in (5,098 mm)
- Width: 74.5 in (1,892 mm)
- Height: 61.5 in (1,562 mm)

Chronology
- Predecessor: Ford Taurus (fourth generation); Ford Crown Victoria
- Successor: Ford Taurus (fifth generation)

The Ford Five Hundred is a full-size four-door, five-passenger, front-engine front- or all-wheel drive, high-roof sedan manufactured in Chicago and marketed in North America and Mexico by Ford in a single generation for the 2005 to 2007 model years.

The Five Hundred was a direct byproduct of Ford's rapid acquisition of numerous brands (e.g., Volvo Cars in 1999), a critical need to leverage those investments, the company's dwindling market share (18.3% in 2004, 17.4% in 2005), and its Way Forward efforts to restructure itself. Notably, with a strong market shift in automotive tastes away from sedans to minivans and SUV/CUVs, Ford made a concerted effort with the Five Hundred to rethink the traditional sedan/wagon formula.

Presented as a single concept drawing at the 2002 New York Auto Show, the Five Hundred was formally presented in production form at the 2004 North American International Auto Show along with its co-developed platform-mates, the Mercury Montego and the crossover Ford Freestyle — the so called Chicago D3's, for the plant where they were manufactured (Chicago Assembly) and the platform they shared, the D3 platform, a revised variant of Volvo's P2 platform.

Ford chose to continue its fourth generation Taurus, critical to the company's fleet sales (to large corporations, small businesses, rental car firms, utility companies, and government agencies) and overlap that production with the Five Hundred, emphasizing the latter's optional all-wheel drive, continuously variable transmission, extensive safety features, large interior volume, and high H-point seating, the latter marketed as Command View seating.

Internally designated the D258 model, the Five Hundred was styled by George Bucher, Chief Designer, under the direction of Ford Vice President of Design, J Mays who gave the Five Hundred its name, recalling the "500" suffix Ford had used to designate a model's top trim level, as with the Galaxie "500".

The Five Hundred's 203 hp engine and unassuming styling became points of criticism, and sales fell markedly short of company projections — requiring substantive discounts by its second model year. The Five Hundred was quickly but lightly facelifted and given a new nameplate for the 2008 and 2009 model years, becoming the fifth generation Ford Taurus.

Having entered production on July 12, 2004 and gone on sale in September 2004, the Five Hundred reached 65% of its projected annual sales of 120,000 — or total domestic sales of 241,000 over three model years. The Five Hundred nameplate continued in use outside North America.

== Background ==
As part of the 1999 acquisition of Volvo Cars and its addition to Premier Automotive Group, Ford Motor Company expanded on its vehicle safety technology capabilities and began development of a 4th generation (D186) Taurus replacement.

In the year 2000, Ford presented the Prodigy concept, a 72 MPG diesel-electric hybrid designed as part of the Partnership for a New Generation of Vehicles. The Prodigy influenced the exterior styling of the Five Hundred as well as the horizontal "three-bar" grille which subsequently became a Ford styling theme.

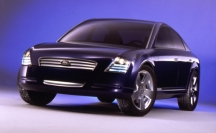
2000 Ford Prodigy

== Advertising ==
Ford introduced the Five Hundred using the tagline "Elevating the Sedan," reflecting the car's unique selling proposition, its overall height and elevated seating, marketed as Command View Seating.

According to the Chicago Tribune, during the Chicago press launch of the Five Hundred (and the Freestyle) in the summer of 2004, Ford had contacted the city to get permission for a sidewalk advertising campaign along six blocks of the city's prominent Magnificent Mile, with 50 to 60 signs on each side of the street — to reach press journalists as they walked between the launch venues. The city claimed Ford never received that permission, and Ford said the city had given verbal permission in a voice mail. In the meantime, Ford had preceded with a guerrilla "ad mat" campaign, featuring Chicago slang terminology, including mock Chicago phrases, e.g., "Da Comfort" and "Da Style."

== Design ==
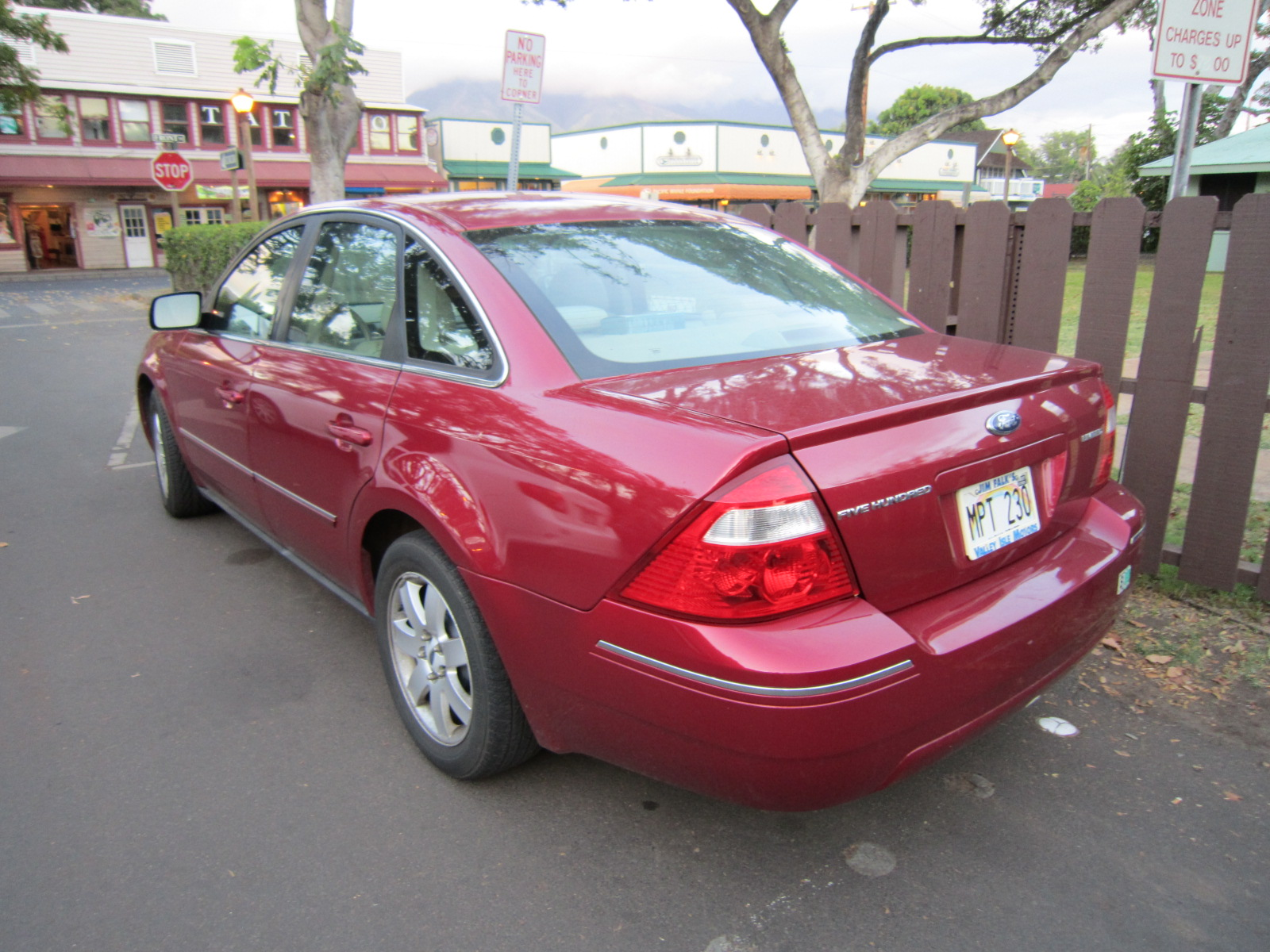
Ford Five Hundred (rear 3/4).

Noted for its minimalist exterior styling, the "strong graphic simplicity" of its interior design, tall interior cabin, high H-point seating and prominent greenhouse recalling the Volkswagen Passat (1997–2005) and Audi A6 (1997–2004), the Five Hundred was designed by George Bucher, Chief Designer, under the direction of Ford Vice President of Design, J Mays, who'd previously designed both for Passat and Audi while with the Volkswagen Group. Ford vice president Phil Martens noted that at a time when the industry was trying to design car-based crossovers, the Five Hundred was the first crossover-based car.

=== Platform and safety ===
The Five Hundred used the Ford D3 platform shared with the Mercury Montego and Ford Freestyle. An evolution of the Volvo P2 platform (used in the Volvo S80), the D3 platform marked the shift to front-wheel drive in full-size Ford sedans; an electro-hydraulic Haldex all-wheel drive system (based on that used on the Volvo S80 and XC90) was optional in all versions of the Five Hundred or Mercury Montego.

The Five Hundred used a 203 hp 3.0L Duratec V6 engine, originally developed with Porsche, its head using the Cosworth casting method. Transmissions included a 6-speed Aisin automatic transmission for front drive models or a ZF CVT for AWD models, the latter a first for a US domestic automaker.

Incorporating independent suspensions front and rear, the Five hundred used MacPherson strut front suspension and a multi-link rear axle with coilover shocks — along with front and rear stabilizer bars and four-wheel anti-lock disc brakes (12.5-inch front, 13-inch rear).

In addition to adapting the P2 platform and its Haldex AWD to the Five Hundred, Volvo engineers incorporated numerous Volvo safety innovations. Front seats sit on a hydroformed cross-car steel beam between the B-pillars (directly below an identical beam above the B-pillars), complemented by reinforced roof crossmember — marketed by Ford as SPACE architecture (Side Protection and Cabin Enhancement), an adaptation of Volvo's Side Impact Protection System (SIPS), channeling impact forces around the passenger compartment. Front frame rails were redesigned to better absorb impact forces. Volvo co-engineered the collapsible steering column and roof-mounted airbags. With standard dual front airbags, the Five Hundred was available with an optional safety package that included both side airbags and curtain airbags. The Five Hundred received both a five-star rating for front- and side-impact performance in government testing, as well as a "Best Pick" rating from the Insurance Institute for Highway Safety for frontal crash performance.

=== Packaging ===
"Space is the ultimate luxury."

— George Bucher

A major strategy behind the design of the Five Hundred, described by Ford as a "high-package" strategy, combines the interior roominess of a large car and retains the exterior proportions, maneuverability, and fuel-economy benefits of a mid-size car. The Five Hundred's driving position, marketed as command seating derives from a major selling point of minivans and SUVs buyers: its raised greenhouse allowing an elevated "H-point"and a more "upright" front seating position, and three and half feet of rear leg room.

A distinguishing feature of the Five Hundred is its 61.5" overall height — over 5 inches taller than the Ford Taurus marketed alongside it. The high-roof design allowed an elevated H-point (hip point). As with the first-generation Ford Focus, the seats of the Five Hundred were positioned relatively high off the floor, providing an upright seating position for improved visibility, access, egress and driver confidence. The rear seat was positioned higher than the front seats. 60/40 folding rear seat supplemented the 21 cubic foot trunk (larger than the Lincoln Town Car). With the option of a folding front passenger seat, a Five Hundred was able to carry objects up to ten feet long inside the vehicle, with a passenger volume EPA-rated at 107.5 cu ft.

While visibility was one factor behind the higher seating position, safety was another. Derived from the Volvo Side Impact Protection System (SIPS), seating sat atop a cross-car steel beam underneath the front seats.

George Bucher, Ford's chief designer said "it was a challenge to sculpt a Ford-styled body around a Volvo chassis, and added that designers used what he calls plainer surfaces with taut lines to give the car a modern look without losing its passenger-car proportions."

=== Trim levels, equipment and updates ===
At introduction, Ford marketed the Five Hundred in three graduating trim levels: SE, SEL, and Limited. An all wheel drive system was available across the range, and included self-leveling shocks. Base prices start at US$22,795 for a front-wheel drive SE and range to US$28,495 for an all-wheel drive Limited. Interior trim featured a new hydrographic system for simulated metal mesh on the SE trim and burled wood on SEL and Limited. All models received a 36,000 mile, three year warranty.

MY 2005: 2005 trim level equipment included:

SE - SE equipment included front-wheel drive; CVT transmission; cloth upholstery; six way power driver's seat with manual lumbar; delayed accessory power; power remote trunk release; folding power mirrors; power locks; power windows with one-touch up/down driver's window; cruise control with steering wheel controls, black speedometer and tachometer, tilt collapsable steering column (aligned to the driver's size and safety-belt use, two power points, front overhead console with dome light, map lights and sunglasses holder; 17" painted alloy rims; AM/FM stereo with single-CD player; body color mirrors and handles; black front grille; simulated carbon fiber interior and console trim; floor mats front and rear, eight cupholders, sliding sunvisors with illuminated vanity mirrors, air conditioning with rotary controls; illuminated entry, second-row reading lights, 60/40 split-folding rear seatbacks, compact spare tire, anti-lock brakes, Ford's proprietary engine immobilizer key passive anti-theft technology, marketed as SecuriLock; post-crash alert system and fob-operated remote keyless entry augmented by a door-mounted keypad system, marketed as Securicode, to enable tiered or time-restricted permissions, i.e., the code giving access to the vehicle but not its operation — and the code being easily changed to prevent subsequent vehicle access.

SE options included a chrome grille; traction control; and a "Safety and Security" package with front-seated mounted side air bags and two-row side curtain airbags; marketed as Safety Canopy — along with anti-theft perimeter alarm, heated side mirrors, and security approach lamps.

SEL - SEL equipment additionally included message center with trip computer, vehicle information center and compass; electrochromic auto-dim rearview center rear view mirror; heated side mirrors; fog lamps; air-conditioning ducted to the rear of the front console, perimeter security alarm; automatic headlamps; automatic temp control; chrome grille; AM/FM stereo with 6-disc in dash CD player with MP3 capability and steering wheel audio controls, eight way power front seats with manual lumbar; two way power passenger seat; fold-down passenger seat, simulated wood interior dash and console trim and an auto-dimming rear view mirror.

SEL options included CVT transmission; rear parking sensors marketed as Reverse Sensing System; power moonroof; traction control; shirred (gathered) leather seats and a safety package with side and two-row side curtain airbags.

Limited - The Limited trim level additionally included shirred (gathered) leather heated seats, two-position memory driver's seat and mirrors, four-way power passenger seat with manual lumbar, cream-colored gauges, analog clock, up-level sound system (marketed under Ford's Audiophile brand) with a subwoofer and an AM/FM stereo with 6-disc in dash CD player and MP3 capability, chrome mirrors, and a trunk cargo net. Options at the Limited trim level included CVT transmission; rear parking sensors marketed as Reverse Sensing System; power moonroof; and integrated Homelink transmitter.

MY 2006 updates: Ford offered the SE, SEL and Limited trim levels for 2006, with an optional navigation radio by Pioneer with Sirius Satellite Radio (Limited); power moonroof and leather seating newly optional on SE trim, optional traction control (previously a no-cost, required option, FWD models) and a ceiling-mounted drop-down DVD monitor, marketed as the Family Entertainment System. A 2006 mid-year running change replaced the exterior mid-door side trim molding on all trim levels with a small sill molding at the bottom edge of the door — and added black mudguards at each wheel.

MY 2007 updates: For 2007, Ford discontinued the SE trim level. Both SEL and Limited trims manufactured after September 4, 2006 received two-row side curtain airbags, marketed as the Safety Canopy. Shirred (gathered) leather became optional on the SEL trim. The powertrain warranty was revised to 5 years / 60,000-mile (97,000 km). SEL option packages included a "Safety and Security" package (before September 2006) with side and two-row side curtain airbags, anti-theft perimeter alarm, heated side mirrors, and security approach lamps; "Convenience Package with 6-disc in-dash CD changer with MP3 capability, dual-zone electronic automatic temperature control, automatic headlamps, fog lamps and outside temperature display; "Interior Power" package with 8-way power driver’s seat and power-adjustable pedals; Chrome Package with 18-inch eight-spoke alloy wheels and a chrome trim mesh grille, and a 5-year / 60,000-mile powertrain warranty.

=== Engineering ===
The Five Hundred was engineered with a quality control system known internally as Total Vehicle Geometry (TVG). Designed by Volvo, TVG was heavily computer-based, allowing access for designers, engineers and suppliers to all data and results related to prototypes at all stages of the design process. With improved participation and access, precision of fit and finish was increased on prototype parts, decreasing the time needed for preliminary production vehicles, so-called pilot vehicles.

Using new powertrain electronics, the Five Hundred employed a CAN bus system with a Black Oak controller and PowerPC machine language and floating-point calculations for improved execution times.

== Discontinuation ==
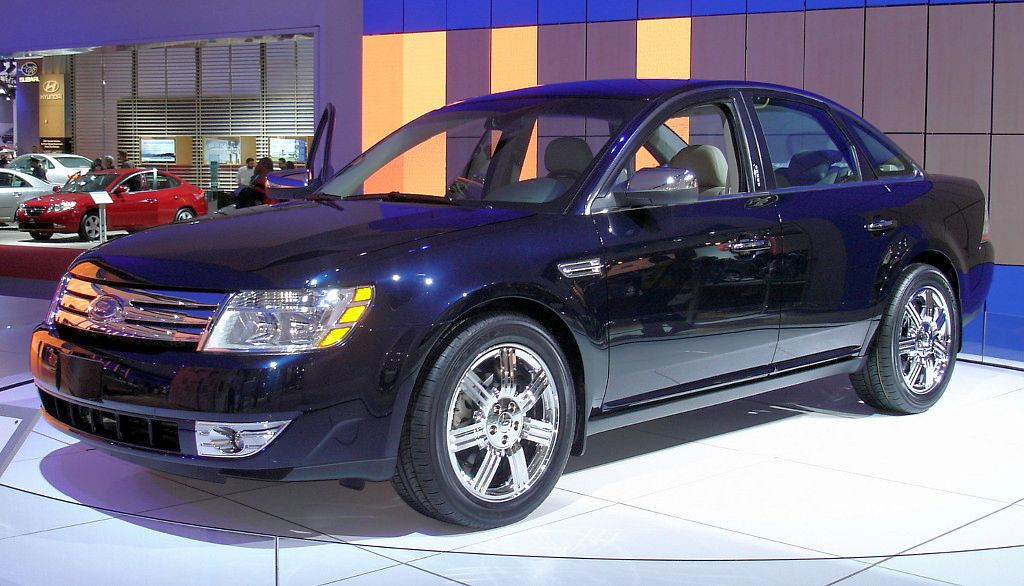
2008 Ford Five Hundred concept. Upon direction of Ford CEO Alan Mulally, this was renamed the Ford Taurus before its production.

The Five Hundred ended production on April 12, 2007, as did the Mercury Montego and Ford Freestyle. For the 2007 North American International Auto Show, Ford introduced a mid-cycle 2008 update of the Five Hundred and Montego; the new sedans had front and rear fascia styling, new interiors, and new powertrains with a 263 hp 3.5L V6 and a new 6-speed automatic transmission.

Although the changes were positively received, Ford CEO Alan Mulally chose to rename all three D3 platform cars, with the Five Hundred and Montego becoming the fifth-generation Ford Taurus and Mercury Sable; the similarly updated Ford Freestyle continued as the Ford Taurus X. Although the Taurus had been out of retail markets since 2006 (the Sable, since 2005), Mullaly cited the larger brand familiarity of the Taurus/Sable nameplates as the reason for the renaming of the two D3 sedans.

For the 2010 model year, the Ford Taurus underwent an extensive redesign. Retaining the D3 chassis, the exterior and interior was revised, to add more aggressive styling. This became the final generation Taurus for North America.

== Sales and incentives ==
Intended to increase the company's profitability and reduce incentives, Ford projected annual Five Hundred sales of 120,000. Actual sales reached approximately 65% of projections. During its initial model year Ford refrained from market incentives, providing substantive incentives midway into its second model year.

Calendar Year	Domestic sales
2004	14,106
2005	107,932
2006	84,218
2007	35,146

== Reception ==
Overall: The Five Hundred was well received for its SUV-like packaging with a raised overall height, elevated seating and large interior volume — as well as its extensive safety features and available CVT transmission and all-wheel drive.

- At the 2004 New York International Auto Show, at the time GM executive, Bob Lutz, said "it is very space- and package-efficient and seems to have a very nice interior from a craftsmanship standpoint. But to me the interesting thing is the broad reuse of that front-wheel-drive and all-wheel-drive architecture, the fact that it shares a common architecture with the Ford Freestyle and allegedly with some Volvo models. If you do it cleverly, you can get quite an array of vehicles that all look and behave very differently."
- Mark Phelan of the Detroit Free Press noted "while there's lots to like about Ford's new big sedan, there's nothing to love. It's a practical but unspectacular car with a couple of shortcomings which drop it to average in the family sedan segment."

Performance: Offering a single 203 hp engine, the Five Hundred's performance was considered acceptable albeit lackluster.

- Ford itself noted the engine's deficiencies, the company's marketing manager noting at the car's introduction that "one of the hurdles we’re going to have to overcome is the 203 horsepower."
- Noted automotive journalists Tom and Ray Magliozzi said "some reviewers (note: not owners) have complained about the lack of power available from the six-cylinder, 203 horsepower engine, given the weight of the Five Hundred, which is just under 4,000 pounds. But we found the engine to be perfectly adequate. It cruised on the highway at 80 without the least complaint. And the power was just fine around town. Only lead-foots would have reason to whine." Writing for Motor Trend, Julian Mackie called the exhaust note "flatulent."

Styling: The Five Hundred's design team had aimed for guilt-free, unpretentious luxury, and assessments ranged from handsome and elegant to overly conservative. The New York Times called the Five Hundred's styling "rigorously understated."

- Stylist George Bucher said "it is not overly styled, but has a large presence because of its size; it's designed to look very upscale."
- Ford's Chief Designer, J Mays, said "It's human nature that everybody wants what they can't have. Let's say you aspire to have a German luxury sedan, but you just don't have the cash to do it. With the Five Hundred, you can pull up in front of a very upscale restaurant or hotel in that vehicle and not feel the least bit embarrassed."
- In 2003, The New York Times' Danny Hakim called the Five Hundred Ford's "answer to European-style sedans like those from Volkswagen and Audi." The car's upper styling, its greenhouse, was commonly noted for closely if not flagrantly mimicking Volkswagen and Audi designs from Mays' own previous tenure with the Volkswagen Group.
- MotorWeek said "Ford aimed for a more upscale feel from the Five Hundred, and the styling reflects that. The lines show a strong European influence, with a front end resembling Ford of Europe’s popular Mondeo. The tail is tall and wide, with very German-looking lights and greenhouse. Not surprising since Ford styling chief Jay Mays is a veteran of Volkswagen and Audi design. Regardless, the new Five Hundred is handsome from every angle."
- Tom and Ray Magliozzi said "at its best, it's plain in a tasteful, slightly Euro way. At its worst, it looks like a geezer-mobile without any thought to styling."
- Pulitzer Prize-winning automotive journalist Dan Neil, then of the Los Angeles Times, said "the car's conservative design shows 'admirable restraint,' noting a similarity to the Passat. "Is the car beautiful, exciting? No. But (it's) well-balanced, grown-up, and it's a terrific packaging job. It suggests mental health, not emotional rescue." He would later describe the styling of the Five Hundred's twin, the Mercury Montego, as "about as sexy as going through your mother's underwear drawer," adding he could not recall "any designed product that is as awesomely cheap-looking as the audio and climate controls in the car.
- In 2006, NPR said the Five Hundred "was an example of a product that worked as a concept and then was just "blanded out" in production." Mark Fields, in charge of Ford in North America at the time, noted that some of the company's products "have been so bland that "the only way you'd recognize them is if they ran over you." Also in 2006, Alex Taylor writing for Fortune said the Five Hundred was "so nondescript that it almost vanished from sight."
- Noted automotive designer and journalist Robert Cumberford said "it's a pretty good trick to make a brand-new car look old, bland and boring right out of the box. 'Early Audi with a (Ford) Mondeo front-end graft' just about describes the styling, and saying it's a 5-liter-engine car with only 3 liters under the hood just about describes the mechanical package."No doubt it's a good car, but one fundamentally uninteresting visually."
- Autos Canada noted: "George Bucher, chief designer of the Five Hundred, described [the Five Hundred] in terms of having "road authority" and "presence” (rather than using adjectives like beautiful or sleek). With this design Ford [was] emphasizing refinement and lack of ostentation, and while it’s by no means unattractive, neither [was] the Five Hundred particularly exciting."
- In 2014, Ford designer J Mays would later call the Five Hundred too conservative, likening the vehicle to a beautifully tailored Brooks Brothers suit, another time saying "I don't think the Five Hundred or Freestyle was one of my brighter moments in Ford, but designing a car is not a solo effort and a lot of people have input on the kind of product they want. I've been at the company 13 years and I've been through five CEOs. Some of those CEOs have had more conservative tastes than others." Mays later conceded of the Five Hundred's styling: "It's just lacking in the emotional appeal that we should have put into it. We were being good team players, and we did our best to wrap what was a best-in-class package with sheetmetal, and we ended up with a car, I think, that compromised itself in terms of style. But we will never make that mistake again. In fact, we haven't made a mistake like that since we did it. I think of all the cars I've designed in my career, I regret not pushing harder on that car."
