= H-point =

Nominal hip position of a vehicle occupant

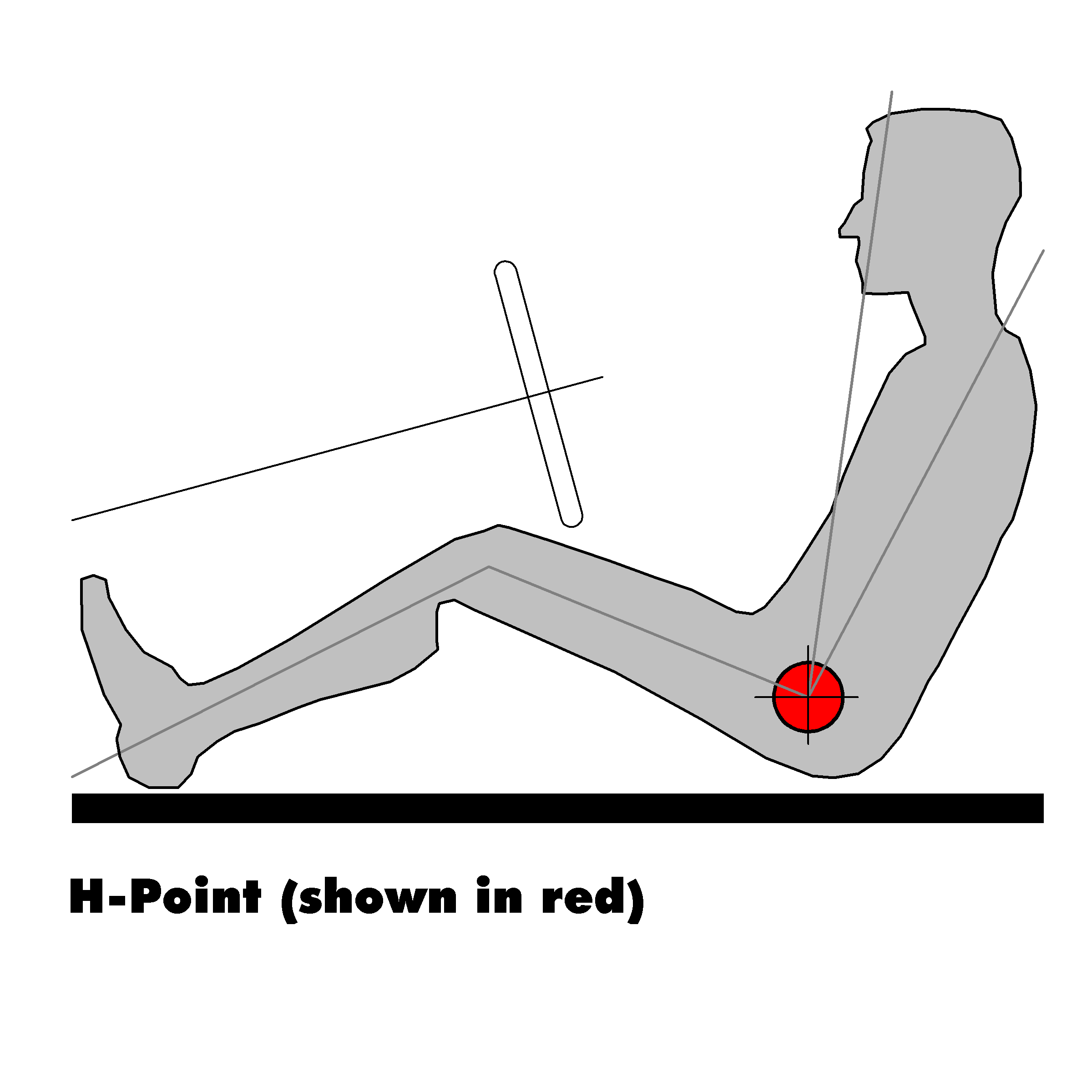

The H-point (or hip-point) is the theoretical, relative location of an occupant's hip: specifically the pivot point between the torso and upper leg portions of the body—as used in vehicle design, automotive design and vehicle regulation as well as other disciplines including chair and furniture design.

In vehicle design, the H-point is also measured relative to other features, for example the h-point to vehicle floor (H30) or h-point to pavement (H5). In other words, a vehicle said to have a "high H-point" may have an H-point that is "high" relative to the vehicle floor, the road surface, or both.

Technically, the H-point measurement uses the hip joint of a 50th percentile male occupant, viewed laterally, and is highly relevant to national and international vehicle design standards such as global technical regulations (GTR). For example, a vehicle design standard known as the Society of Automotive Engineers (SAE) J1100 Interior Measurement Index sets parameters for such measurements as H30 (H-point to vehicle floor); H5 (H-point to pavement surface), H61 (H-point to interior ceiling) and H25 (H-point to windowsill).

As with the location of other automotive design "hard points," the H-point has major ramifications in the overall vehicle design, including roof height, aerodynamics, handling (especially at highway speeds), visibility (both within the vehicle and from the vehicle into traffic), seating comfort, driver fatigue, ease of entry and exit, interior packaging, safety, restraint and airbag design and collision performance. As an example, higher H-points can provide more legroom, both in the front and back seats.

By the early 2000s there had been a global trend toward higher H-points relative to both the road surface and the vehicle's interior floor. Referring to the trend in a 2004 article, The Wall Street Journal noted an advantage: "the higher the H-Point, the higher you ride in the car, and in some cases, the more comfortable you feel behind the wheel".

Buses, minivans, SUVs and CUVs generally have higher H-points than sedans, though certain sedans feature higher H-points than most, for example the Ford Five Hundred and the Fiat 500L. Sports cars and vehicles with higher aerodynamic considerations, by contrast, may employ lower H-points relative to the road surface. When an automobile features progressively higher H-points at each successive seating row, the seating is called stadium seating, as in the Dodge Journey, and Ford Flex.

Vehicle interior ergonomics are integral to an automotive design education. The Society of Automotive Engineers (SAE) has adopted tools for vehicle design, including statistical models for predicting driver eye location and seat position as well as an H-point mannequin for measuring seats and interior package geometry. See SAE J826 for a description of the H-point machine. Occupant posture-prediction models are used in computer simulations and form the basis for crash test dummy positioning.

Regulatory definition: For the purpose of U.S. regulation and GTRs (Global Technical Regulations)—and for clear communication in safety and seating design—the H-point is defined as the actual hip point of the seated crash test dummy itself, whereas the R-point (or SgRP, seating reference point) is the theoretical hip point used by manufacturers when designing a vehicle—and more specifically describes the relative location of the seated dummy's hip point when the seat is set in the rearmost and lowermost seating position.

== See also ==
- Anthropometry
- Ergonomics
