= Chicago Assembly Plant =

Ford automobile manufacturing plant

- Operated: 1924–present
- Location: Chicago, Illinois, United States
- Coordinates: 41°39′43″N 87°33′39″W
- Industry: Automotive
- Products: Ford Explorer
- Owner: Ford Motor Company

Chicago Assembly Plant (sometimes referred to as Torrence Avenue Assembly) is Ford Motor Company's oldest continuously operated automobile manufacturing plant. It is located at E. 130th Street and Torrence Avenue in the Hegewisch neighborhood of Chicago, Illinois, United States. As of 2023, Chicago Assembly Plant manufactures the sixth-generation Ford Explorer, the second-generation Lincoln Aviator, and the Police Interceptor Utility.

== History ==
Production started on March 3, 1924, as an alternative site to the River Rouge Plant for Model T production. It switched to Model A production in 1928, and built M8 Greyhound and M20 Armored Utility Car armored cars during World War II. It was the site of pickup truck production for 40 years before that operation stopped in 1964. In 1985, it was selected as the site of production for the Ford Taurus and Mercury Sable midsize sedans.

Ford spent US$400,000,000 in 2004 to modernize the plant. It switched to production of D3-platform vehicles for 2005, and to CD6-platform vehicles for 2020. Nine automotive suppliers have built factories nearby at the Ford Chicago Manufacturing Campus developed by CenterPoint Properties. Ford's Chicago plant is a center for flexible just-in-time production. As of 2023 the Ford Web site stated that it employed about 5,800 workers, mostly paid per hour.

As of 2022, there were concerns that Ford's phasing out of internal combustion-engined vehicles in favour of electric vehicles could throw into question the future of the Torrence Avenue complex.

== Products made (model years) ==
As of 2023, the following vehicles are produced at Chicago Assembly Plant:

- Ford Explorer (since 2011)
- Police Interceptor Utility
- Lincoln Aviator (since 2020)

== Past (model years) ==
- Lincoln MKS (2009–2016)
- Ford Taurus X (2008–2009)
- Mercury Montego (2005–2007)
- Ford Freestyle (2005–2007)
- Ford Five Hundred (2005–2007)
- Ford Taurus (1986–2019)
- Mercury Sable (1986–2009)
- Mercury Marquis (1983–1986)
- Ford LTD (1983–1986)
- Mercury Cougar (1981–1982)
- Ford Granada (1981–1982)
- Ford Thunderbird (1977–1981)
- Ford Torino (1976)
- Ford Elite (1974-1976)
- Mercury Marquis (1969–1976)
- Ford Galaxie (1969–1976)
- Ford Country Sedan (1952-1974)
- Ford Country Squire (1950-1991)
- Ford Deluxe (1941-1948)
- Ford Custom (1949-1951)
- Ford Crestline (1951-1954)
- Ford Fairlane (1955-1961)
- Ford F-100 (1953–1964)
- Ford Model A (1927–1931)
- Ford Model T (1924–1928)

== See also ==
- List of Ford factories
