= Ford Crown Victoria =

Full-size sedan manufactured by the Ford Motor Company

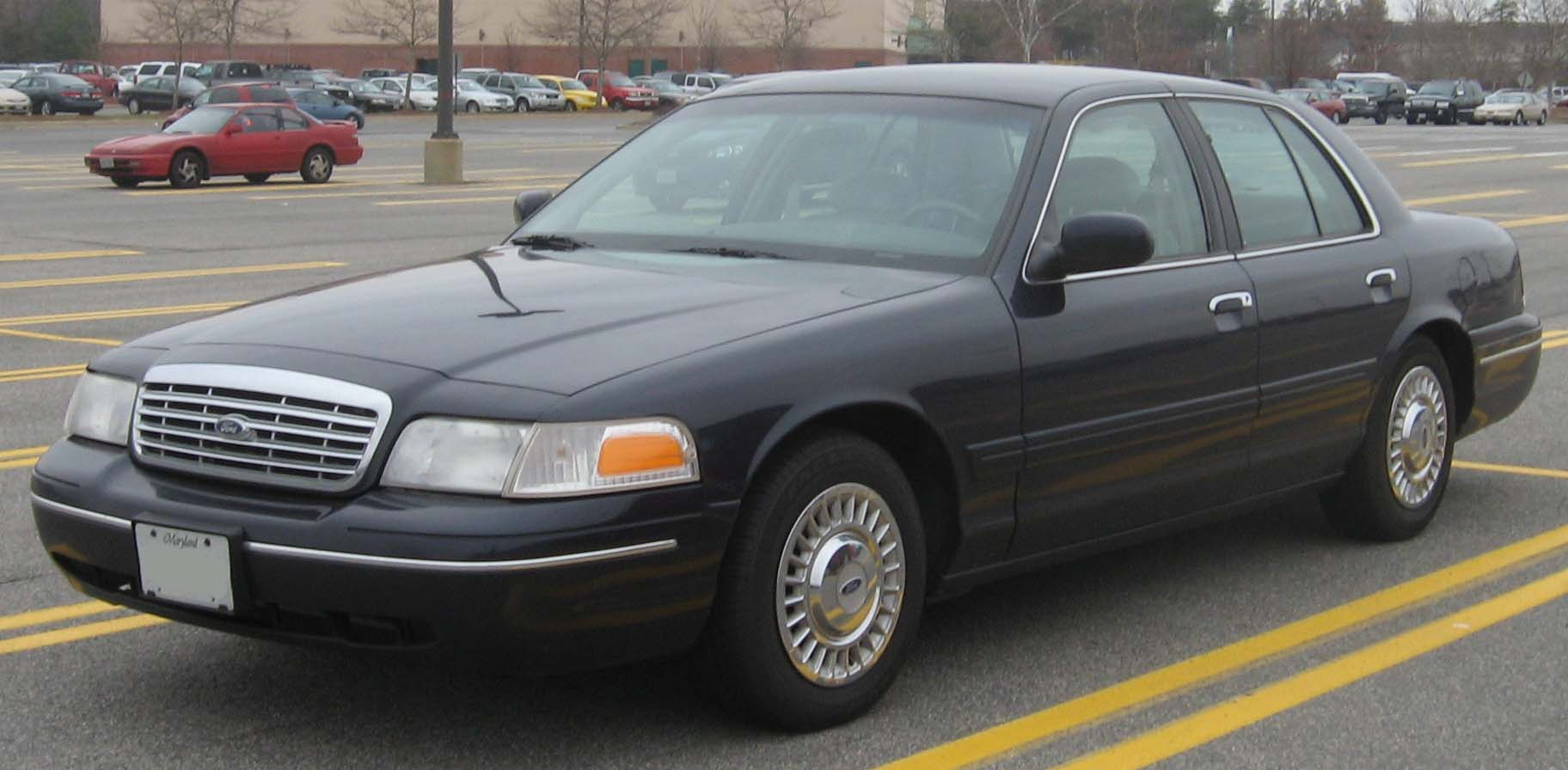
- 1998–2002 Ford Crown Victoria LX

Overview
- Manufacturer: Ford Motor Company
- Production: January 1991 – September 15, 2011
- Model years: 1992–2012
- Assembly: Canada: Talbotville, Southwold, Ontario (St. Thomas Assembly)

Body and chassis
- Class: Full-size car
- Body style: 4-door sedan
- Layout: FR layout
- Platform: Ford Panther platform
- Chassis: Body-on-frame

Chronology
- Predecessor: Ford LTD Crown Victoria

The Ford Crown Victoria ("Crown Vic") is a full-size sedan that was marketed and manufactured by Ford. The successor to the Ford LTD Crown Victoria, two generations of the model line were produced from the 1992 until the 2012 model years. The Ford counterpart of the Mercury Grand Marquis, the Crown Victoria was the largest sedan marketed by Ford in North America, slotted above the Ford Taurus. The Crown Victoria Police Interceptor (1992–2011) was marketed specifically for law-enforcement use; a long-wheelbase Crown Victoria sedan (2002–2011) was marketed primarily for taxi cab fleets.

The Crown Victoria was produced on the rear-wheel drive, body-on-frame Ford Panther platform, sharing its chassis with the Grand Marquis and Lincoln Town Car. From 1997 until their 2011 discontinuation, the three model lines were the sole four-door sedans produced in North America with a full-length frame, rear-wheel drive, and a standard V8 engine. While the front and rear crumple zones were engineered into the vehicle, it was one of Ford's products that were not of unibody construction for the entire generation. The Crown Victoria was the last car made using the Ford Panther platform.

For its entire production, the Crown Victoria was produced by Ford Canada alongside the Grand Marquis at St. Thomas Assembly in Southwold, Ontario. From 1991 until 2011, over 1.5 million cars (including Police Interceptors) were produced by St. Thomas Assembly prior to its closure. A 2012 Crown Victoria (intended for Middle East export) was the final vehicle produced by the facility. Following the discontinuation of the model line, the Crown Victoria was not directly replaced, with the full-size Ford Taurus serving as the next basis for Ford police cars.

== Origin of name ==
Prior to the 1992 model year, Ford used the Crown Victoria nameplate on two vehicles; both were flagship models of their full-size model range. From 1955 until 1956, the nameplate was used for premium two-door Ford Fairlanes. For 1980, the nameplate returned as the top trim of Ford LTD sedans, denoting all Ford full-size sedans in North America from 1983 through 1991.

A styling feature used for both versions is a stainless-steel band trimming the B-pillars ("crowning" the roof).

=== 1955–1956 ===
For 1955, the Ford Fairlane was introduced as the premium Ford model range. Slotted above the Victoria two-door hardtop, the Crown Victoria debuted as the flagship trim of the Fairlane. In place of the popular hardtop roofline, the Crown Victoria was fitted with a B-pillared roofline. Similar to the Mercury XM-800 concept car (though changed in angle), the B-pillar was fitted with a wide stainless-steel band ("crowning" the roof), giving a sleeker appearance to the roofline.

Alongside the standard two-tone roof, the Crown Victoria Skyliner was fitted with a fixed sunroof; a tinted acrylic glass panel formed the entire roof ahead of the B-pillar.

For 1956, the Lifeguard option package was introduced as an option for the Fairlane Crown Victoria (as with all Ford cars).

For the 1957 redesign of the Ford model line, the Crown Victoria was retired from the Fairlane series with no replacement. The Skyliner name made its return in a different form, denoting the Ford Fairlane 500 Skyliner retractable hardtop convertible.

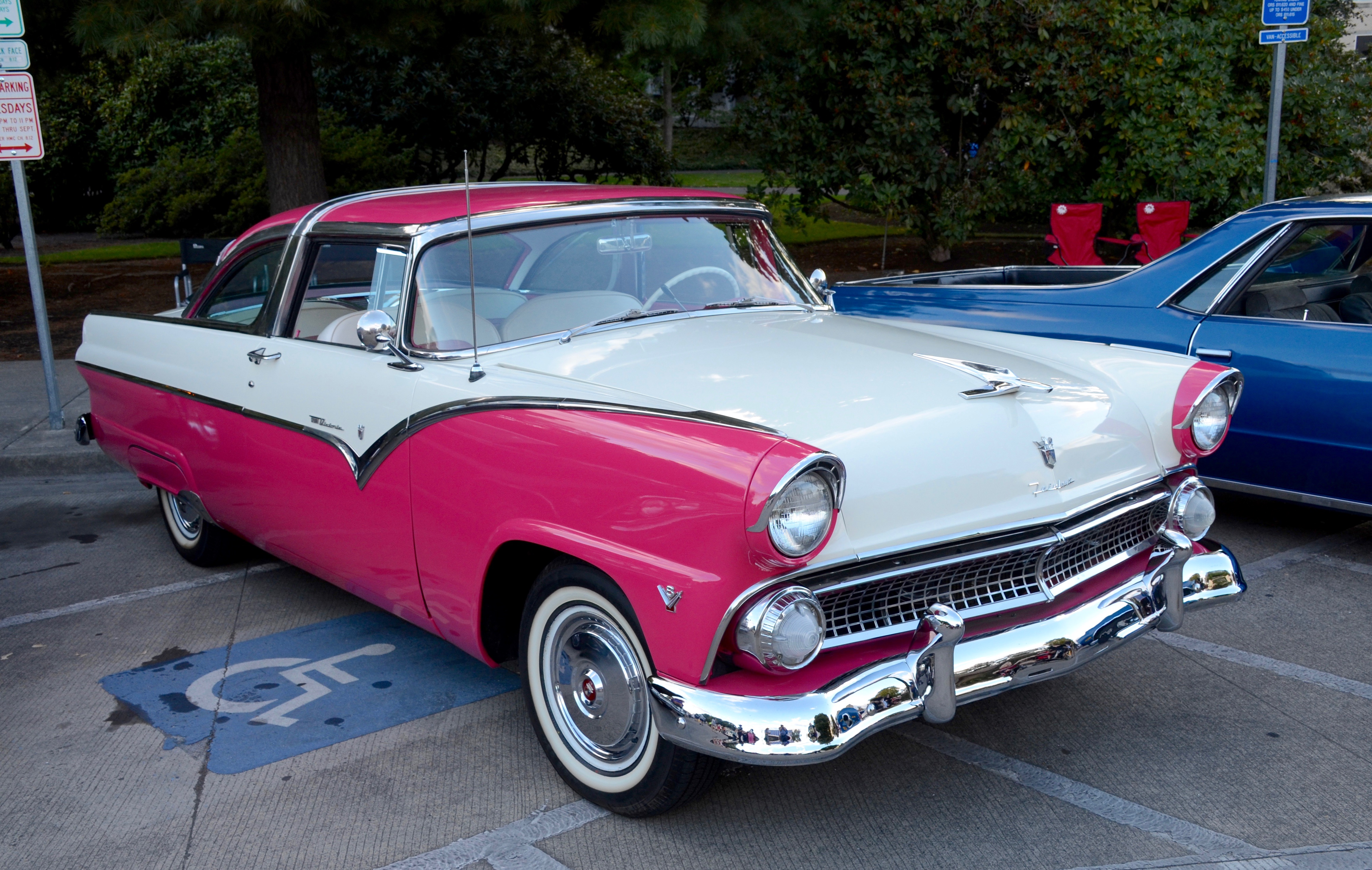
1955 Ford Fairlane Crown Victoria

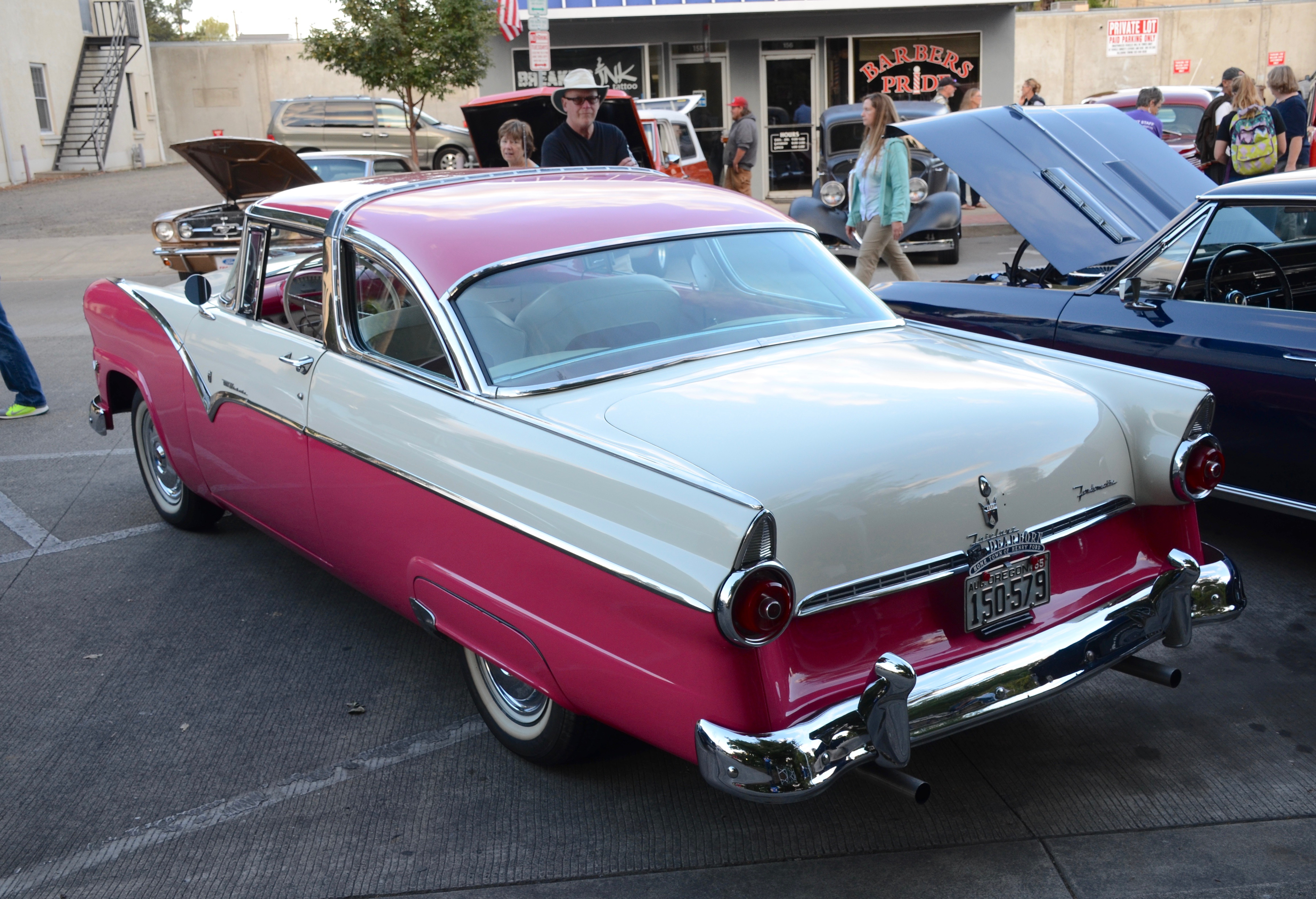
rear view, 1955 Ford Fairlane Crown Victoria

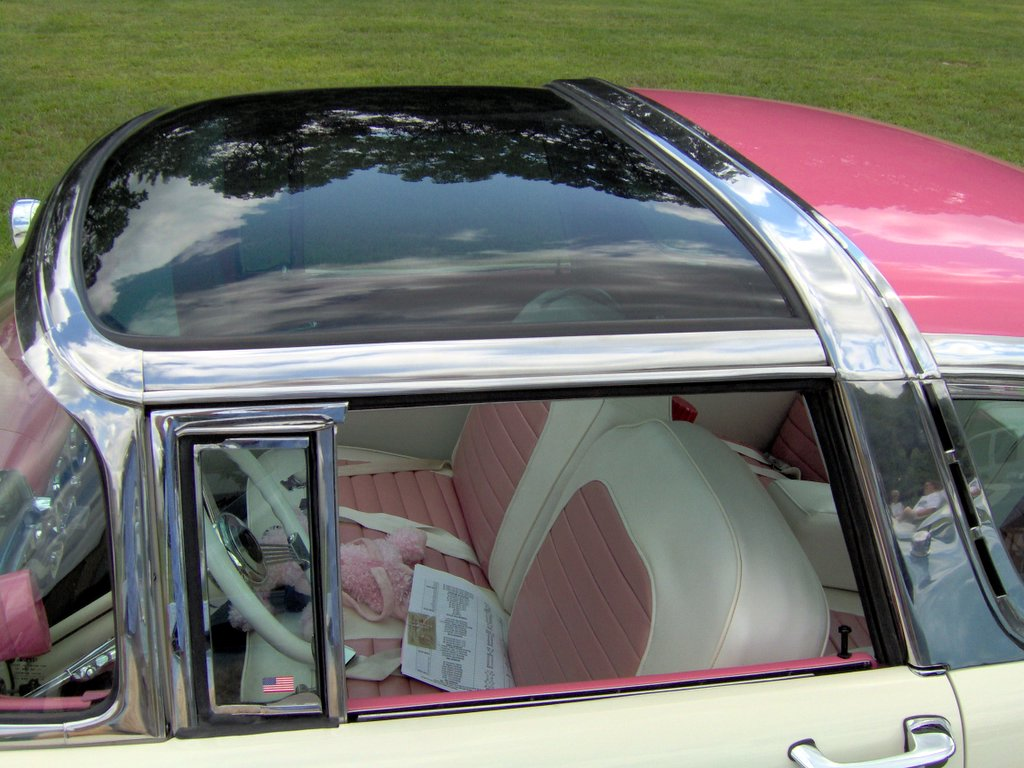
Fixed sunroof of Ford Fairlane Crown Victoria Skyliner

=== 1980–1991 ===
For the 1980 model year, the Crown Victoria nameplate was revived after a 23-year hiatus, becoming part of the Ford LTD model range. Again, a premium trim of the full-size range (replacing the LTD Landau), the LTD Crown Victoria became two-door and four-door sedans. To distinguish the model line from its Mercury (Grand) Marquis counterpart, Ford revived the stainless-steel band to trim the B-pillars (in heavily revised form); the design was used on examples with the standard vinyl half roof.

For 1983, as part of an extensive revision of the midsize and full-size model lines of all three Ford divisions, the LTD Crown Victoria became a stand-alone model line (alongside its Mercury Grand Marquis counterpart). The Ford LTD nameplate was shifted to the midsize segment, replacing the Ford Granada. While having a separate roofline (separate doors and B-pillar trim) from its sedan counterparts, the LTD Country Squire station wagon shared its interior trim with the Crown Victoria sedan (a non-woodgrain Crown Victoria wagon was also introduced).

Discontinued after the 1991 model year, the LTD Crown Victoria (and LTD Country Squire station wagon) marked the final usage of the Ford LTD nameplate in North America. Ford of Australia produced its own Ford LTD as its flagship model line (derived from its own Fairlane) from 1973 until 2007; as neither Mercury nor Lincoln were officially marketed in Australia, the LTD was developed as a luxury vehicle.

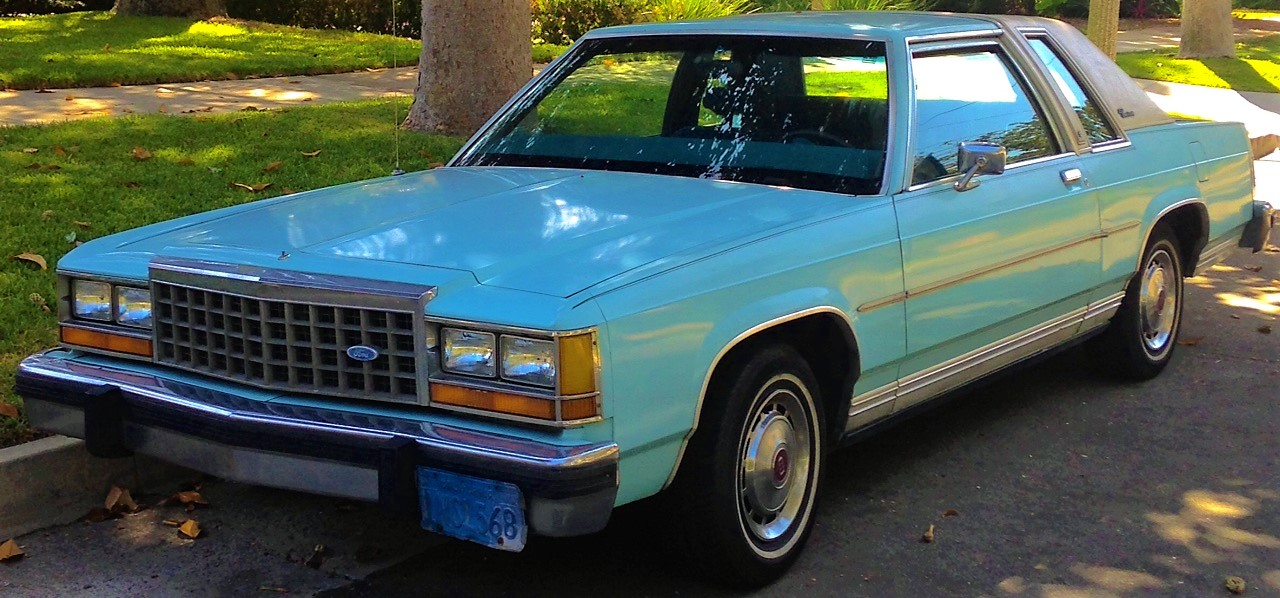
1985 Ford LTD Crown Victoria two-door sedan

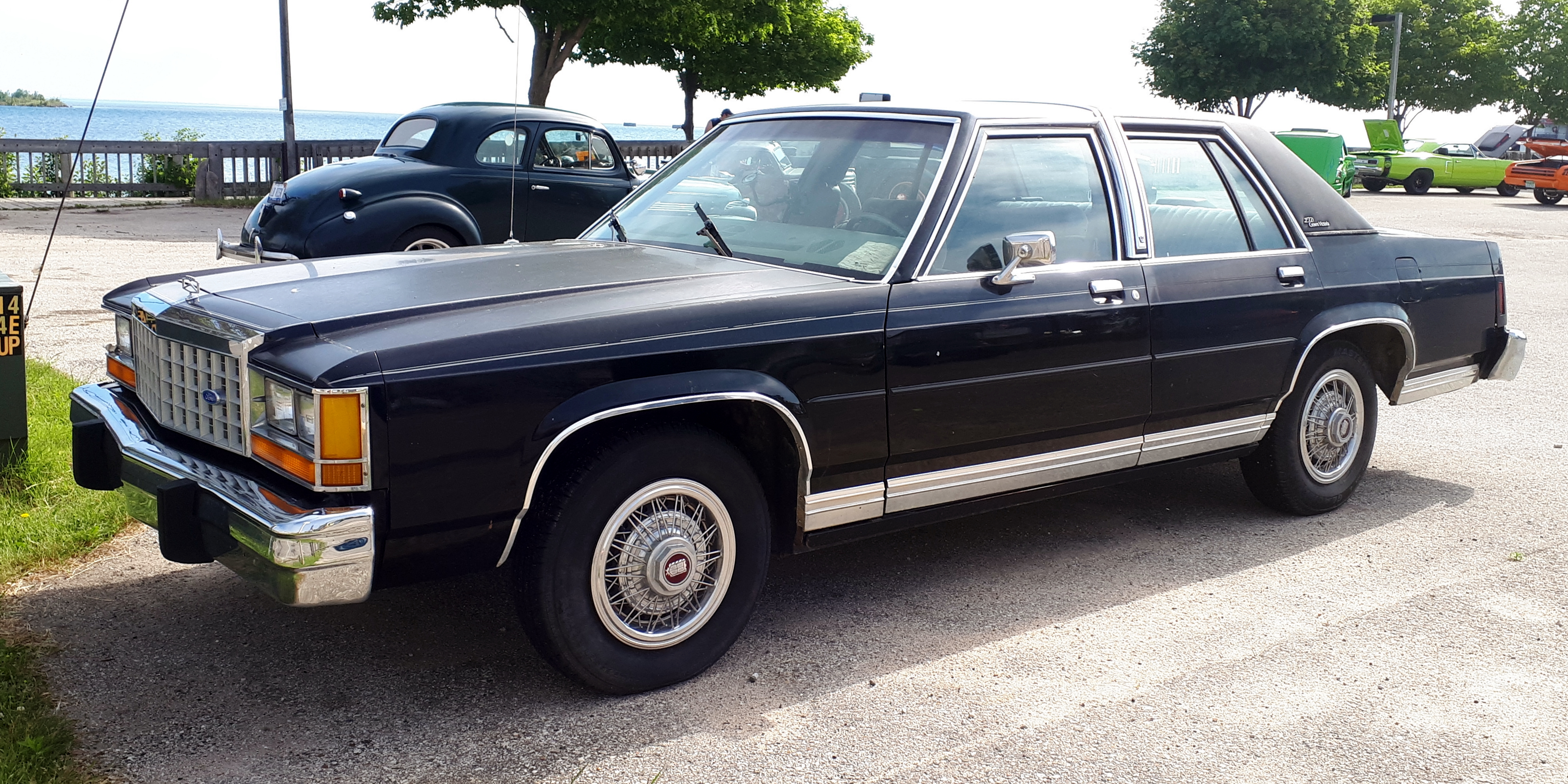
Ford LTD Crown Victoria four-door sedan

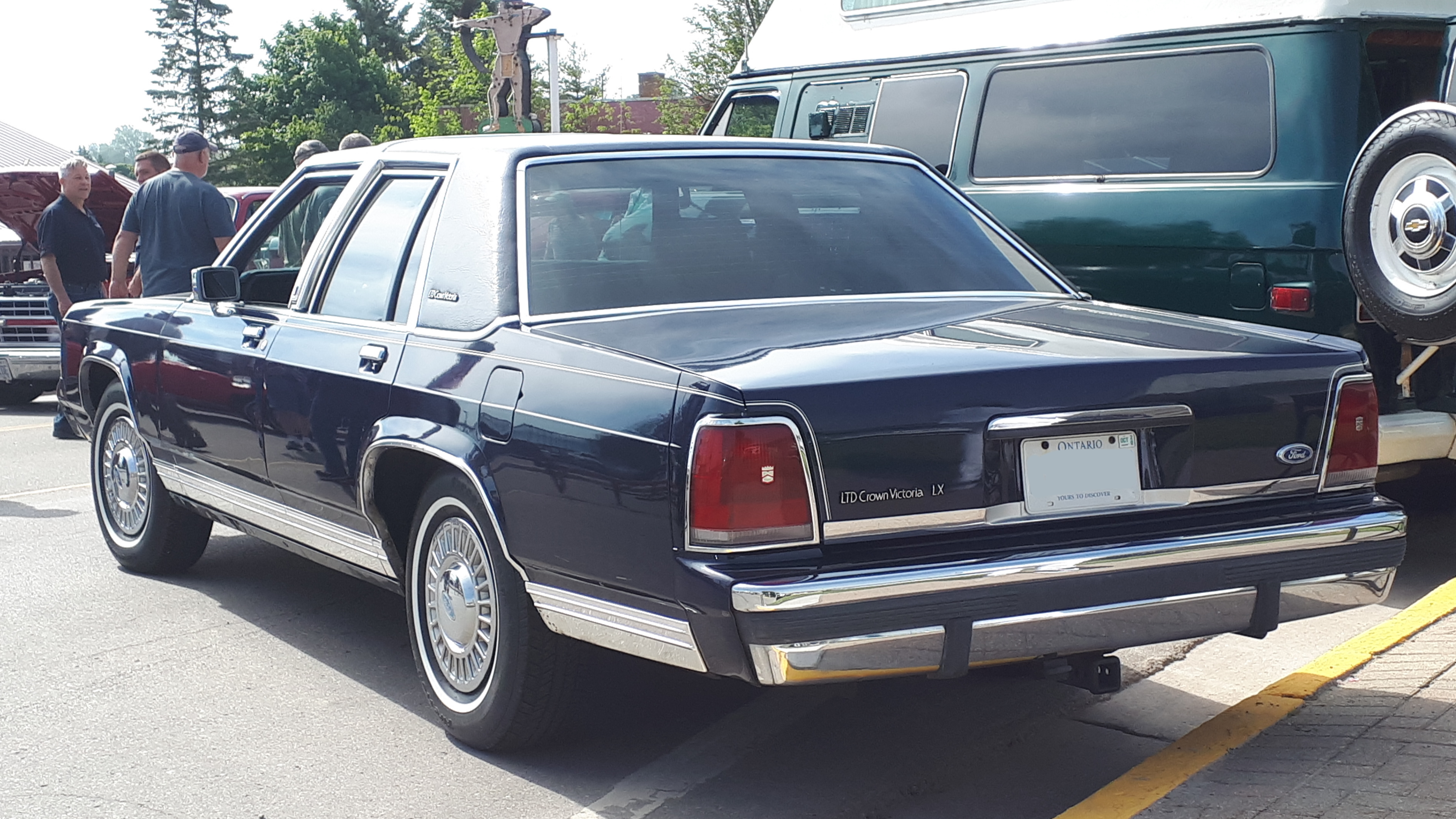
Ford LTD Crown Victoria four-door sedan (facelift)

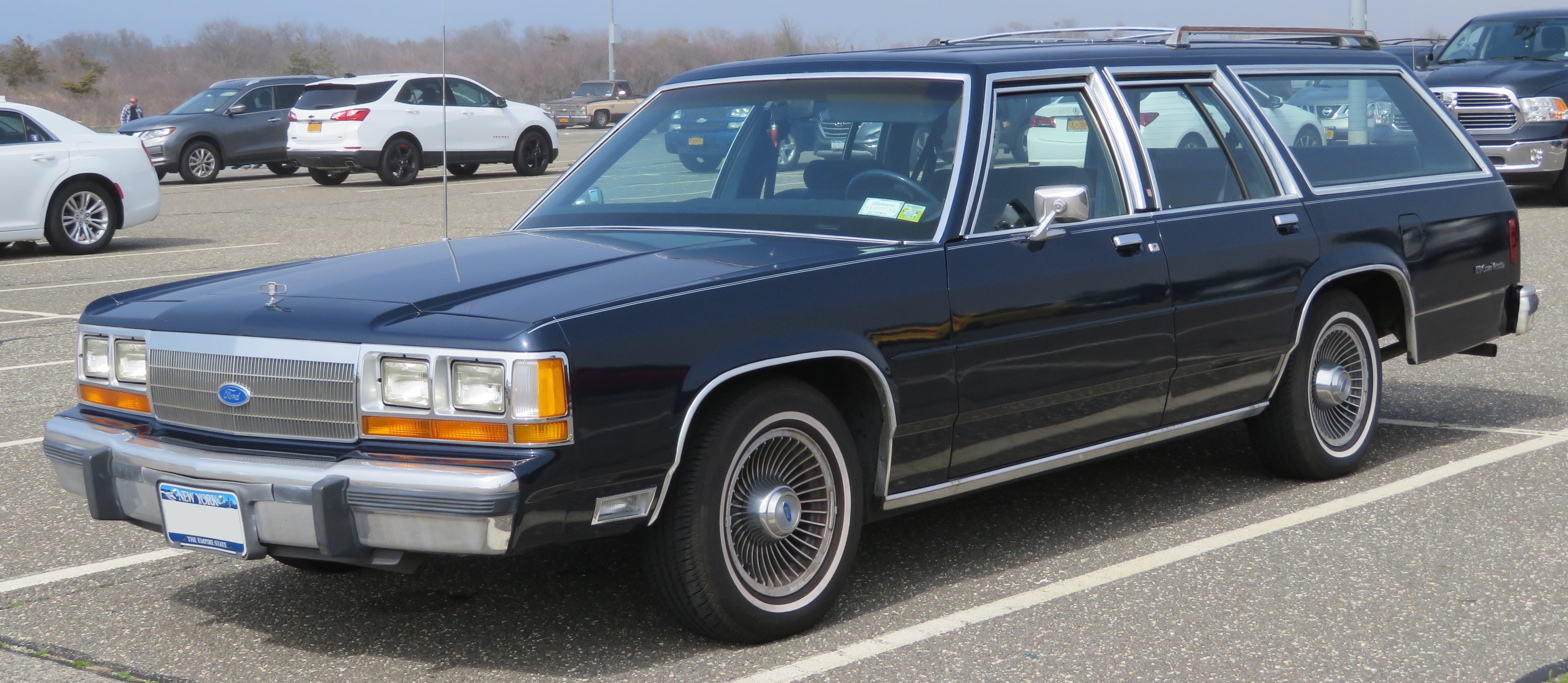
Ford LTD Crown Victoria S station wagon

== First generation (EN53; 1992–1997) ==
First generation (EN53)
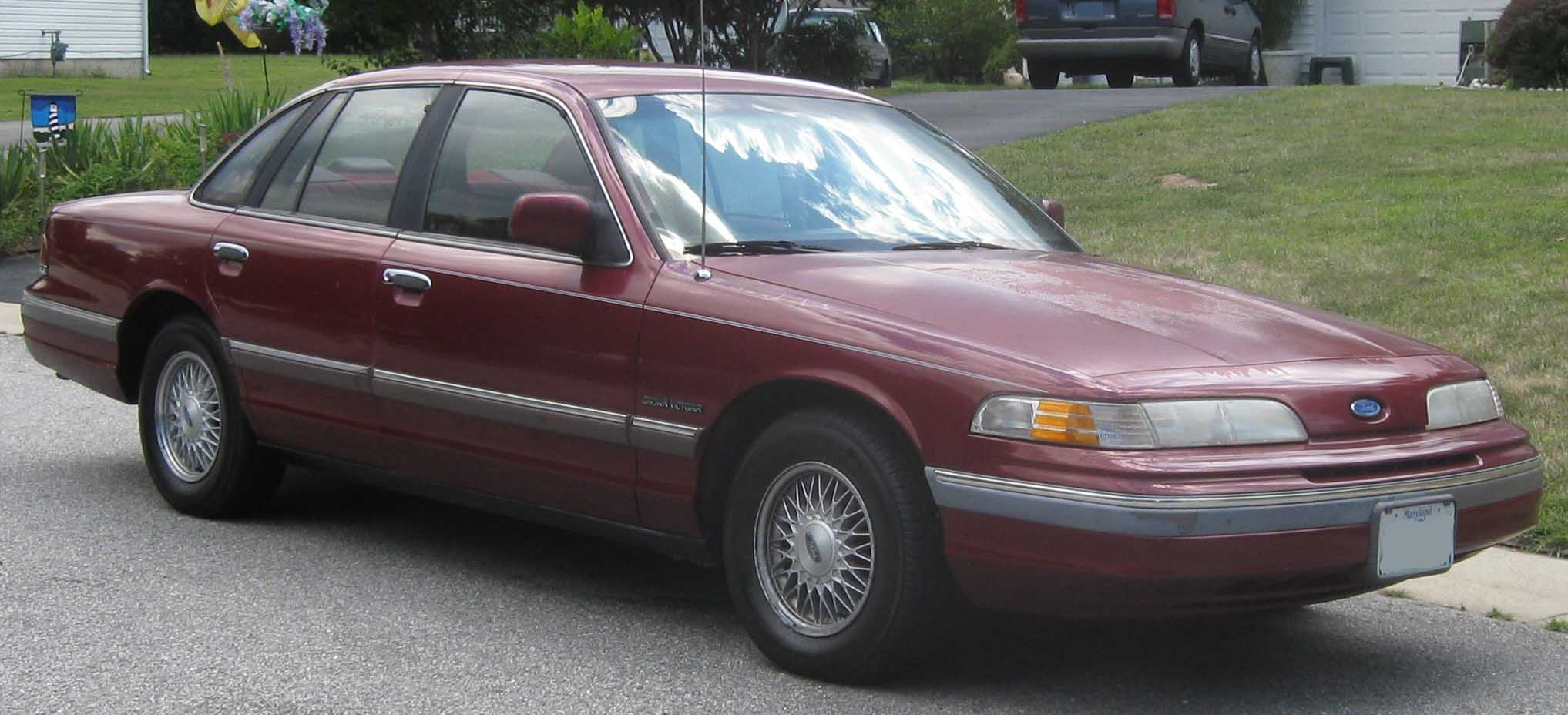
- 1992 Ford Crown Victoria LX.

Overview
- Production: January 14, 1991 – October 1997
- Model years: 1992–1997

Body and chassis
- Related: Mercury Grand Marquis; Lincoln Town Car

Powertrain
- Engine: 4.6 L 2v SOHC Modular V8
- Transmission: 4-speed AOD automatic 4-speed AODE automatic 4-speed 4R70W automatic

Dimensions
- Wheelbase: 114.4 in (2,906 mm)
- Length: 1992–94: 212.4 in (5,395 mm); 1995–97: 212.0 in (5,385 mm)
- Width: 77.8 in (1,976 mm)
- Height: 1992–94: 56.7 in (1,440 mm); 1995–97: 56.8 in (1,443 mm)
- Curb weight: 3,748–3,849 lb (1,700–1,746 kg)

In the first quarter of 1987, development began on a redesign codenamed "EN53". The Ford Crown Victoria was unveiled on November 28, 1990, and began production in January 1991 as a 1992 model, launching on March 21, 1991. Fleet sales of the vehicle were postponed for 14 months to maximize availability for buyers at launch. In line with the redesign of the 1991 Chevrolet Caprice (its chief competitor), the 1992 Crown Victoria featured a major exterior redesign, while retaining the previous-generation chassis. Ford reduced the coefficient of drag of the exterior from 0.42 to 0.34 (nearly matching the 0.32 of the Ford Taurus) to enhance aerodynamics and fuel efficiency, giving the first generation Crown Victoria its sleek, wedge-shaped design that came to be known as the "aero" look.

Due to a market shift in family-oriented vehicles, the Crown Victoria was offered exclusively as a four-door sedan, with the wood-trimmed LTD Country Squire station wagon discontinued. While the Ford Taurus and Mercury Sable continued in production with optional three-row seating, the Country Squire was essentially replaced by the Ford Aerostar, Ford Econoline/Club Wagon, and Ford Explorer.

Ford benefitted from a unique loophole in CAFE standards when the 1992 Crown Victoria and its Grand Marquis twin were launched. To avoid paying gas-guzzler taxes, Ford modified its supplier network so that the two vehicles could be classified as imports from Canada, effectively removing the full-size sedans from the Ford domestic CAFE fleet (alongside the Ford Mustang V8) and placing them in its imported fleet (alongside the Ford Festiva).

=== Chassis ===
In lieu of developing an all-new platform architecture, the Crown Victoria retained the Panther platform of its LTD Crown Victoria predecessor. Although launched in 1978, the Panther chassis underwent extensive upgrades to improve its road manners and handling; major updates were made to the steering and suspension tuning. To improve braking performance, the Crown Victoria gained four-wheel disc brakes, which were only seen on the Lincoln Mark VII, Ford Taurus SHO, and Ford Escort GT (1991–1996). Available as options, anti-lock brakes and low-speed traction control became popular features. For 1997, several updates were made to improve handling response and steering control.

Showcased in the redesign was the new Modular V8 engine. First introduced in the 1991 Lincoln Town Car, the 4.6 L SOHC V8 replaced the overhead-valve 302 cu in (4.9 L) small block V8 and was the first of a family of overhead-cam engines that would eventually appear in several Ford and Lincoln-Mercury cars and trucks. Lighter than its predecessor, the 4.6 engine produced nearly identical torque output while producing 40 additional horsepower in its standard single-exhaust configuration. As with its predecessor and the Lincoln Town Car, the 4.6 was paired with a four-speed overdrive automatic transmission. In 1993, the Ford AOD transmission was replaced by the electronically controlled AOD-E version. For 1995, the AOD-E was replaced by the 4R70W, a heavier-duty version introduced in the Lincoln Mark VIII.

=== Body ===
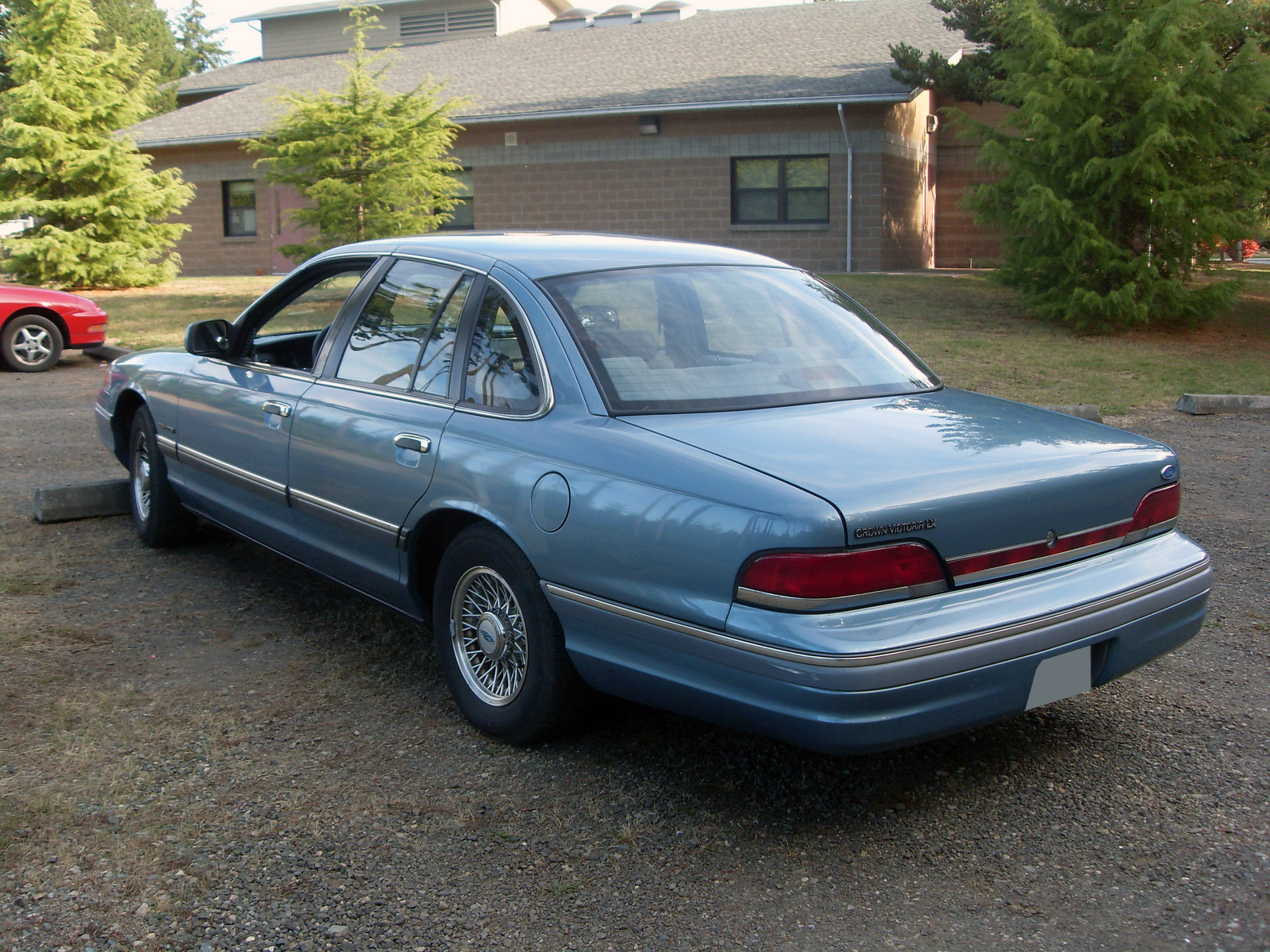
1994 Ford Crown Victoria LX, with a facelift first introduced in 1993.

Ford based much of the Crown Victoria's appearance on the first-generation Ford Taurus, a look pioneered by Ford VP of Design Jack Telnack. Though the Taurus became wildly popular in its market segment, Telnack's "aero" look proved to be either a love or hate proposition with potential buyers of the Crown Victoria. Along with its distinctive no-grille front fascia, the Crown Victoria shared a similar roofline with the Taurus, similar body and bumper moldings, similar door handles, aircraft-style doors, and similarly shaped headlamp and taillamp clusters. To reduce aesthetic commonality with the Mercury Grand Marquis, only the front doors, windshield, and alloy wheels were shared between them.

For the interior, the two vehicles also were given different seats, door trim, and dashboards; the Crown Victoria featured an instrument panel with round dials that included voltage and oil-pressure gauges, while the Grand Marquis featured a horizontal speedometer without the full instrumentation. An electronic instrument panel was introduced as an option, featuring a trip computer with two trip odometers, instantaneous and average fuel economy, distance remaining to an empty fuel tank, and outside temperature readout. Though better received than the 1991 redesign of the Chevrolet Caprice, the 1992 Crown Victoria was met with disapproval from some critics and buyers, leading Ford to revise the exterior. For the 1993 model year, a grille was added to the front fascia (though it retained its "bottom-breather" cooling system configuration) and a red reflector strip was added to the trunk lid to visually connect the taillamps. For the 1995 model year, a midcycle redesign had more extensive changes to the Crown Victoria; a 6-six-slot grille replaced the egg-crate design, and wider taillamps were added to the rear with the license plate positioned between them on the trunk lid. Inside, the 1995 Crown Victoria had redesigned seats and a new dashboard, which was now shared with the Grand Marquis. The new design featured larger controls and switches, with the radio enlarged and positioned higher. The gauge cluster retained its previous layout. In late 1995, the first-generation "brick" airbag steering wheel was replaced by one with a smaller hub that returned the horn button to the center of the wheel. For the 1996 model year, the "Crown Victoria" fender script badging was removed.

=== Features ===
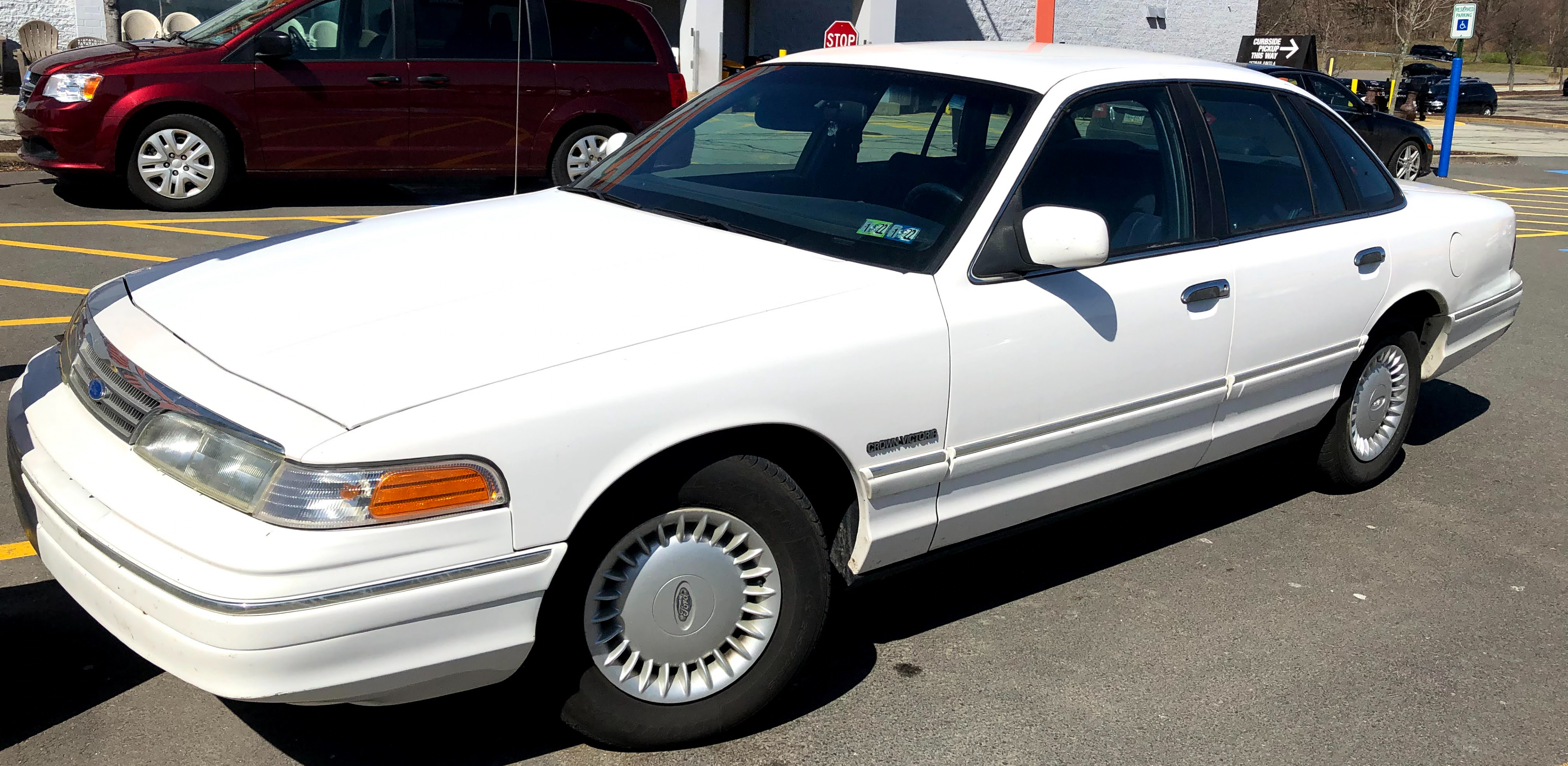
1994 Ford Crown Victoria.

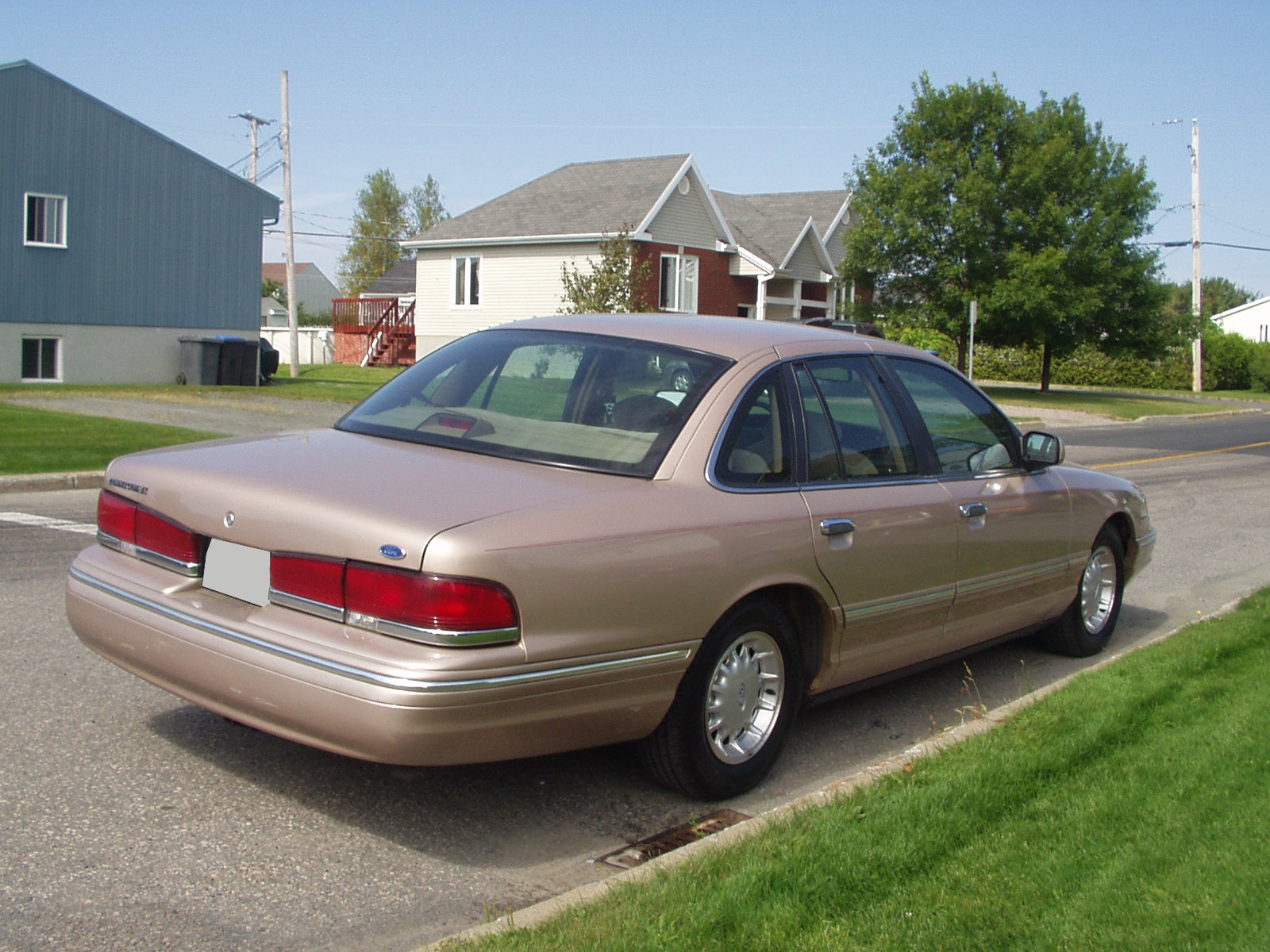
1996 facelift Ford Crown Victoria.

As with its LTD Crown Victoria predecessor, the Crown Victoria was a six-passenger automobile; the front seat was a 50/50 split bench seat. The Crown Victoria was sold in two trim levels: base and LX, with the latter forming the majority of non-fleet sales. In addition, the Crown Victoria P71 replaced the fleet-market "S" designation in 1993; the P71 was marketed exclusively for law-enforcement sales.

As with the Mercury Grand Marquis, a driver airbag was standard equipment and a passenger airbag was added as an option during later 1991 production. It later became standard in 1993 for the 1994 model year. Popular features were the antilock brakes and low-speed traction control. For 1996, a single-key entry system became standard, along with a hidden radio antenna, rear window defroster, and tinted glass. Automatic digital climate control and a JBL audio system became available on the LX.

For the 1993 model year, cupholders were added to the pull-out dashboard ashtray drawer, and the date feature was removed from the digital clock. A one-touch down feature was added for the driver's door power window as standard equipment, while Ford's proprietary door-mounted keypad system, marketed as Securicode, as well as an auto-dimming electrochromic rearview mirror, became optional equipment. Audio systems were also updated with an optional JBL sound system with a subwoofer and an optional 10-disc CD changer.

==== Touring Sedan ====
For 1992, Ford introduced the Crown Victoria Touring Sedan as a performance-oriented flagship trim. The Touring Sedan featured a number of suspension and handling improvements over the Crown Victoria LX, featuring the heavier-duty suspension components of the police-package version, and also including wider tires, rear air suspension, removal of the speed limiter, and a 210 hp dual-exhaust variant of the 4.6 L V8. Optional features included speed-sensitive steering and larger-diameter sway bars. Distinguished by its standard two-tone exterior paint scheme (with painted alloy wheels), the Touring Sedan featured a unique leather interior with every feature available on a Crown Victoria at the time. For a lower price, Ford offered the performance upgrades of the Touring Sedan on the LX as the Handling and Performance Package alongside a separate towing package. The Touring Sedan was a one-year-only model, as it was discontinued after 1992. However, the Handling and Performance Package remained an option in various forms until 2007.

=== Production figures ===
Ford Crown Victoria production figures
	Yearly Total
1992	136,949
1993	100,179
1994	100,983
1995	98,309
1996	108,252
1997	123,833
Total	668,505

== Second generation (EN114; 1998–2012) ==
Second generation (EN114)
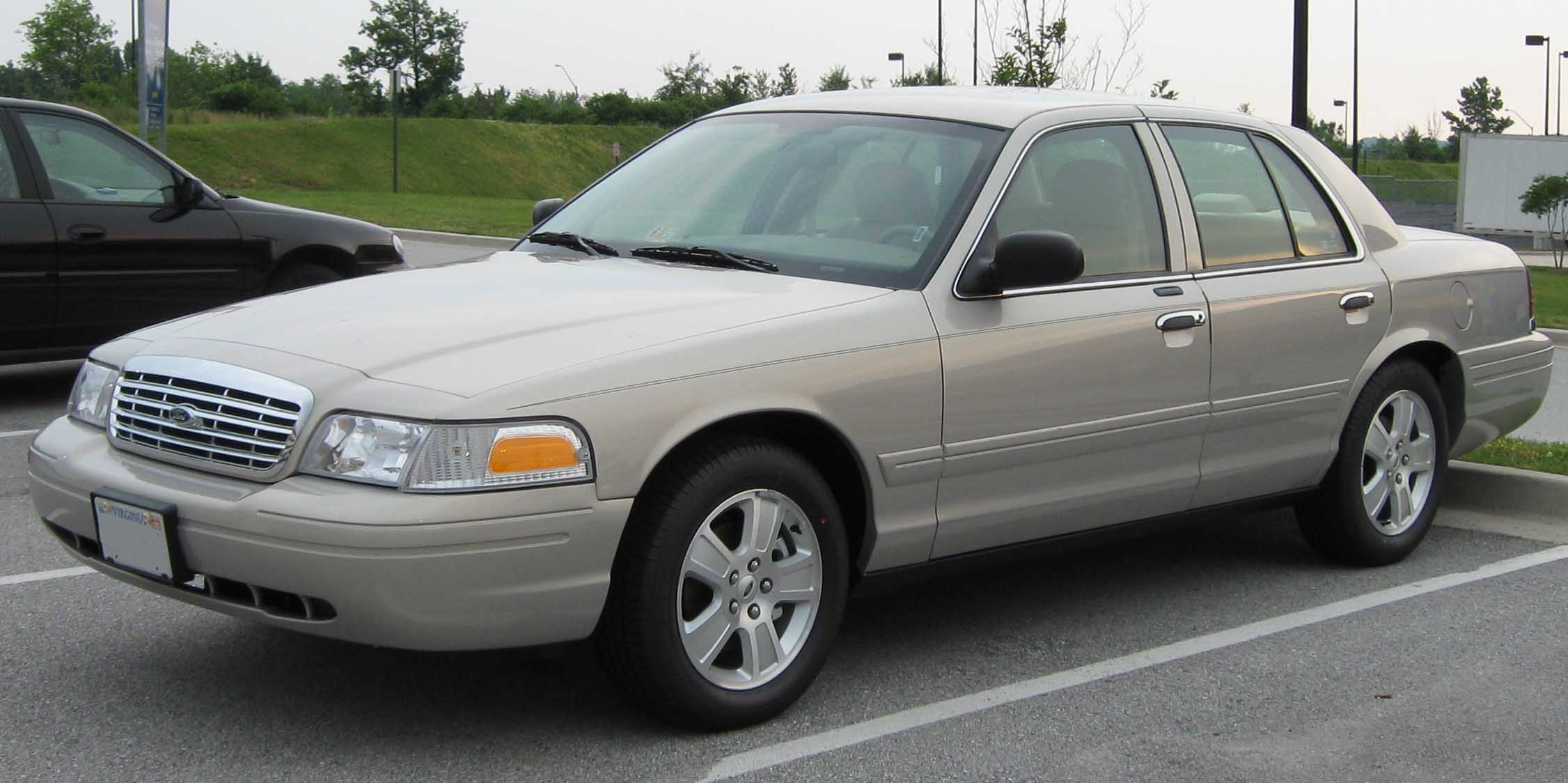
- 2007 Ford Crown Victoria LX

Overview
- Model years: 1998–2012

Body and chassis
- Related: Ford Crown Victoria Police Interceptor; Mercury Grand Marquis; Mercury Marauder; Lincoln Town Car

Powertrain
- Engine: 4.6 L 2v SOHC Modular V8
- Transmission: 4-speed 4R70W/E automatic 4-speed 4R75W/E automatic

Dimensions
- Wheelbase: 114.7 in (2,913 mm); 120.7 in (3,066 mm) (LWB)
- Length: 212.0 in (5,385 mm); 219.0 in (5,563 mm) (LWB)
- Width: 77.3 in (1,963 mm)
- Height: 56.8 in (1,443 mm)
- Curb weight: 4,057 lb (1,840 kg)

The second-generation Crown Victoria commenced sales on 26 December 1997. Although the previous Ford Crown Victoria had better critical and marketplace acceptance than the controversial styling of the 1991 Chevrolet Caprice, its sales struggled to match those of its Mercury Grand Marquis counterpart. In an effort to gain acceptance among buyers (and increase parts commonality), for the 1998 model year, the Crown Victoria adopted much of the exterior design of the Mercury Grand Marquis.

Following its 1998 introduction, the second-generation Crown Victoria underwent an extensive revision for the 2003 model year. Introduced in April 2002, while the exterior saw no change, nearly the entire chassis was redesigned, with major updates to the suspension and steering.

=== Body ===
The redesigned Crown Victoria adopted the formal notch-back roof-line of its Mercury counterpart, causing it to lose its rear C pillar windows. All four doors were now shared with the Mercury (previously, the front doors were shared). On the front fascia, both the grille and headlamps were enlarged. The rear fascia underwent a redesign, as large tail lamp units were mounted at the corners of the body, replacing the previous full-width design. A fender mounted radio antenna would appear for 2005, but was reversed back to the original rear-windshield unit in 2006. In contrast to its Mercury counterpart, the Crown Victoria had considerably less use of chrome trim. LX Sport models forewent chrome trim altogether, as they adopted a fully monochromatic paint scheme.

=== Interior ===
While a large portion of the interior was retained from the first generation, the 1998 redesign brought some changes to the interior, as the seat design was revised slightly, and the chrome trim found on the column shifter and turn signal switch was deleted. The gauge cluster needles were switched from orange to red, and its backlighting was switched from light blue to green. Ford's "Securi-Lock" anti-theft system (PATS) was now standard on all retail models; the move necessitated the switch to a transponder key and a new key-less entry remote. Also, a new two-spoke steering wheel took the place of the former four-spoke design. LX models were now equipped with an 8-way power driver seat that featured a lumbar function and an auto-dimming rear-view mirror with a built-in compass. For the 2000 model year, changes included an emergency trunk release system, a "Belt Minder" (seat belt reminder chime that sounds for an unbelted front seat occupant), and LATCH anchors to comply with US federal safety regulations.

In 2001, the seat-belts were redesigned; the move coincided with the introduction of Ford's Personal Safety System, which also included seat position sensors, seat belt pre-tensioners, and dual stage airbags for improved safety. Furthermore, redundant controls for the climate control and radio became optional on LX trim vehicles. Heated side mirrors became standard in 2002, along with floor mats, power pedals, and improved cloth upholstery; for LX-trim vehicles, a trunk storage organizer became an option.

With the 2003 update, the interior saw further revisions. Redesigned door panels, seats, headrests, and new switch-gear modernized it. Wiper-activated headlamps were now standard for all non-police models. A new dual media CD/cassette radio was initially standard, but became optional midway through the 2003 model year. Additionally, side airbags were introduced as an option.

As the model progressed, the interior would continue to see periodic updates. The Crown Victoria was offered with PPG laminated side glass beginning in 2004 to reduce the transmission of UV light in the interior; it was one of the first American vehicles to do so. A new steering wheel design with a non-locking column was introduced in 2005, replacing the design seen since 1998. 2005 also introduced a front passenger weight sensor, which allowed the restraint system to automatically enable or disable the passenger airbag, when necessary. Lastly for 2005, a factory sunroof was made available for LX models.

In 2006, the analog odometer/speedometer setup and the digital dash cluster option was deleted as a new gauge cluster with a tachometer became standard; the Crown Victoria was the last Ford vehicle without a tachometer. On LX models, the new gauge cluster included a message center, which featured a redundant speedometer, distance to empty reading, fuel economy reading, oil life monitor, digital odometer, and compass. For the 2007 model year, the optional side airbags underwent revisions to better protect passengers in side-impact collisions; they were made standard in 2009 along with recessed window switches and power pedals. The final change to the interior came for 2011, where the headrests were redesigned to meet new federal safety standards.

=== Chassis and specifications ===
Under the 1998 redesign, multiple changes were made to the Crown Victoria's mechanical systems. An updated 4.6L V8 engine now received an increase in horsepower to 200 hp and 215 hp for dual exhaust models. A two-speed electronically controlled radiator fan was introduced along with fail-safe cooling. The ignition system was switched over to a coil-on-plug design (shared with other Modular engines), replacing the dual coil pack design from 1997. Additionally, the radiator overflow tank was moved off the passenger fender well and onto the radiator surround, while the power steering reservoir was moved from the driver-side fender well to the front of the engine block. The 4R70W transmission now mandated the use of Mercon V fluid. Furthermore, the rear suspension was redesigned to improve general road manners (at the expense of reduced towing capacity), as its original three-link coil-spring configuration was replaced with a four-link configuration that featured a Watt's linkage. Continuing the use of four-wheel disc brakes, larger brake rotors and new dual-piston front calipers necessitated a shift to 16-inch wheels for all models. Lastly, the traction control system was revamped to work on all speeds. For 1999, ABS became standard on all retail Crown Victoria models.

For the 2001 model year, the 4.6L V8 received new "Performance Improved" (PI) cylinder heads. As a result, horsepower ratings were increased to 220 hp and 235 hp on dual exhaust models. Additionally, ABS once again became optional.

From 1998 through 2004, the 4R70W four-speed automatic was paired with the 4.6 L V8, replaced by the 4R70E for 2005 (the latter designed to accommodate electronic throttle controls); the 4R75W was exclusive to the 2004 Police Interceptor. In 2006, a revised 4R75E transmission became standard on all Crown Victoria models. Most models used a 12-inch torque converter, while 2000-01 Handling and Performance Package and Police Interceptor models from 1999 to 2011 used a higher stall 11.25-inch unit.

=== 2003 update and re-engineering ===
For the 2003 model year, the Ford Panther platform was re-engineered for the first time since its 1979 introduction. While the Lincoln Town Car and Mercury Grand Marquis saw extensive exterior redesigns, the Crown Victoria retained its exterior design introduced in 1998. However, substantial changes were made to the chassis. A new, fully boxed & hydro-formed frame along with a new aluminum #2 cross-member strengthened chassis rigidity and improved safety. According to Ford, the torsional rigidity of the new frame was increased by 24%, and its resistance to vertical bending was increased by 20%. For the first time, the Crown Victoria adopted speed-sensitive rack and pinion power steering (replacing the long-running recirculating ball system); it increased steering precision and road feel. The suspension was entirely revamped, with the adoption of aluminum front lower control arms, revised front upper control arms, updated steering knuckles, and coil-over front shocks. In the rear, twin-tube shocks (in use since the mid-1960s) were replaced by mono-tube shocks; to improve handling, the shocks were inverted and moved to the outside of the chassis rails. As part of the suspension upgrades, the Panther-chassis vehicles were fitted with high positive offset (flat-face) wheels. ABS once again became standard, as improved brakes were introduced. They featured a quiet EBD brake booster with mechanical panic assist that optimized front-rear brake bias. To add, the entire exhaust system was redesigned, with exhaust hangers now mounted to the frame rails to reduce NVH.

Several changes were also made under the hood, with the 4.6L V8 receiving revised engine tuning and a power increase due to the addition of an engine knock sensor. The engine now produced 224 hp and 239 hp on dual exhaust models; these would be the final horsepower increases for retail and non-police fleet models until the end of production in 2011; police models would however see one final increase to 250 hp in 2004. The engine oil pan was enlarged to 6 U.S. quarts for increased oil life. Additionally, the fuel system was switched over to an electronic return-less system, and the EGR system was revised, which resulted in improved carbon emissions. Several visual changes were also made under the hood, with a new engine cover being introduced that featured a silver "V8" emblem. The power steering reservoir was relocated from the front of the engine and onto the radiator shroud. A quieter, improved variable-speed radiator fan replaced the outgoing two-speed unit. Furthermore, the engine oil fill cap was moved to the passenger side valve cover. Lastly, an accessory belt shield was now mounted to the front of the engine.

There were some minor mechanical changes from 2003 to 2012. The natural gas (NGV) engine option was discontinued for 2005, and the throttle control was switched to drive-by-wire. The switch to electronic throttle control necessitated that the cruise function be moved to the engine computer, which was relocated to the top of the left inner fender. Furthermore, 2005 introduced an improved 31-spline rear axle as well as a heated PCV valve. 2006 saw the introduction of Flex Fuel as an option. In a minor revision for 2008, the engine's valve covers were redesigned, and Flex Fuel capability became standard.

==== 2003 mid-year de-contenting ====
Midway through the 2003 model year, Ford introduced a series of cost-cutting measures to all Panther platform vehicles, which were estimated to save around US$4,000,000 (~$6.7 million in 2025) in production costs per year. The Crown Victoria saw numerous deletions including the removal of the remote locking fuel door, body-colored mirror caps, auto parking brake release, engine compartment lamp, front seat bottom pouches, dual media CD/Cassette radio, power-adjustable pedals (except LX models), foam sound absorbing inserts inside the headliner, black B-pillars (now body-colored), silver "V8" emblem on the engine cover, and the elimination of the rear stabilizer bar on all non Fleet, Handling, or LX Sport versions. Several colors were also deleted: Aspen Green Metallic, Chestnut Clearcoat Metallic, Deep Wedgwood Blue, Gold Ash Metallic, Matador Red, and Silver Frost. Additionally on US models, the rear turn signals were changed from having separate amber sections to being combined with the red brake light bulbs. These changes took effect in December 2002. The de-contented 2003 vehicles are often referred to as "2003 Job #2" and "2003.5" models.

With falling retail sales and increased focus on other models, the Crown Victoria would continue to see periodic cost-cutting measures: For 2004, the chrome bumper trim strips were deleted along with the passenger-side dual sun-visor, standard heated mirrors (now optional), and the optional trunk organizer. Additionally, Ford's proprietary door-mounted keypad system, marketed as its Securicode, was deleted from the base model. Base trim versions also lost their chrome exterior door handles in favor of black handles. Moreover, the tail-lamps had their amber turn signal lens deleted, and the four bulb setup was simplified to a two-bulb design with an all red housing. Beginning in 2008, the five-spoke LX Sport wheels became the sole wheel choice for all LX and GCC Export models. In 2009, the exterior side trim was switched to a single design, and side airbags became standard equipment along with power adjustable pedals; all of which were done to streamline production. Further production streamlining occurred for 2010, when all Crown Victoria models received an extended transmission tail-shaft housing (formerly exclusive to the Police Interceptor). As production neared the end, some 2011–12 models were produced with black trunk fascias.

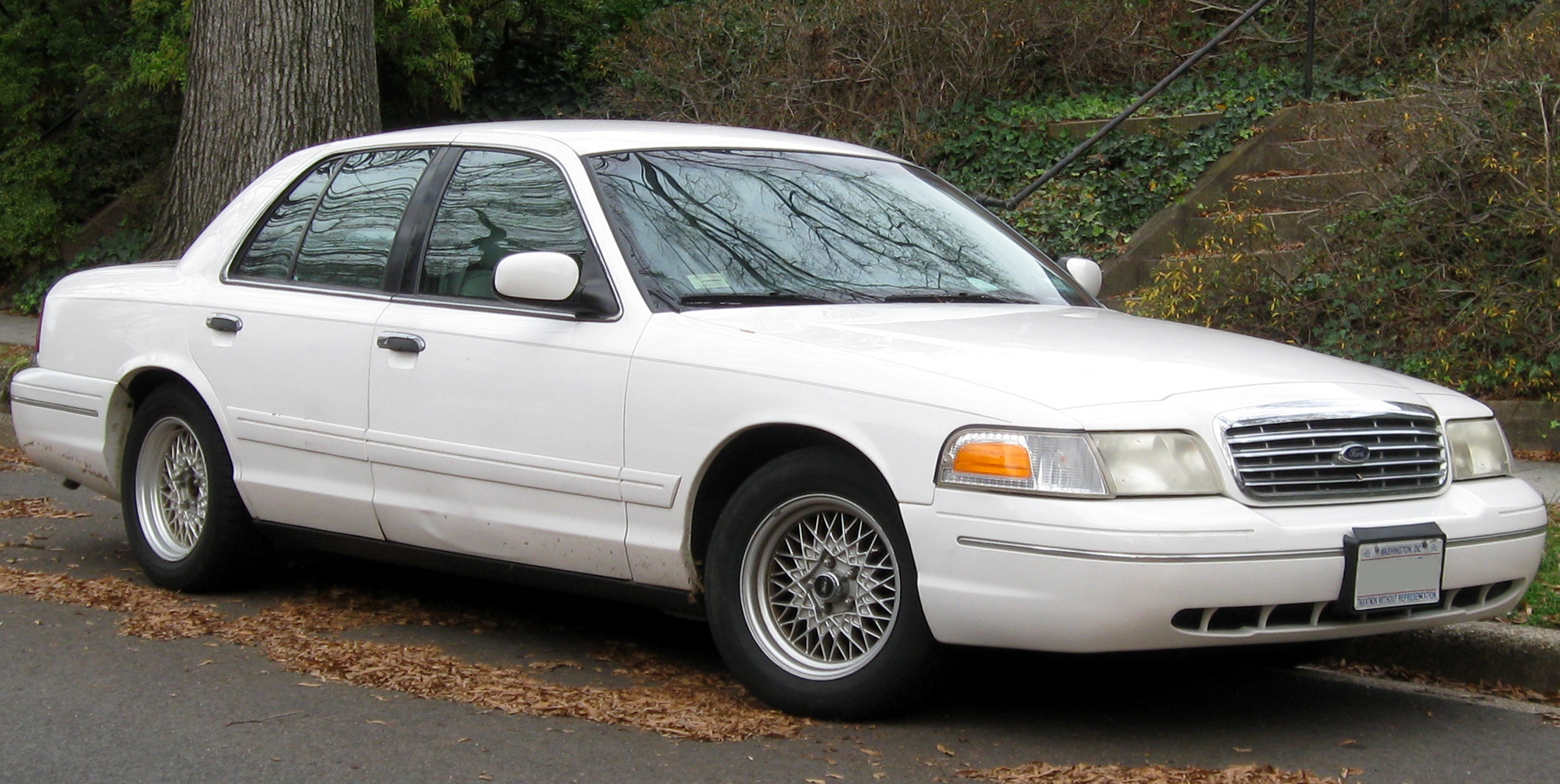
1998–2002 Ford Crown Victoria LX Handling and Performance Package

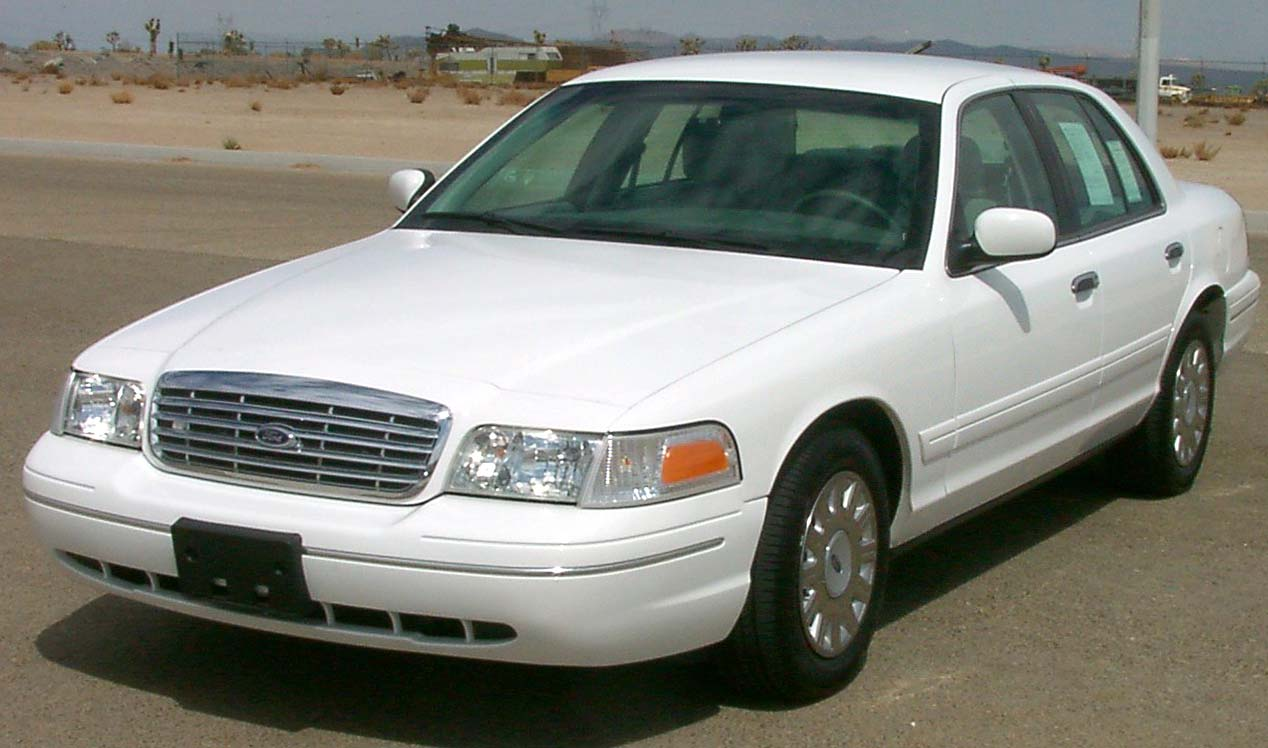
2003 Ford Crown Victoria Base

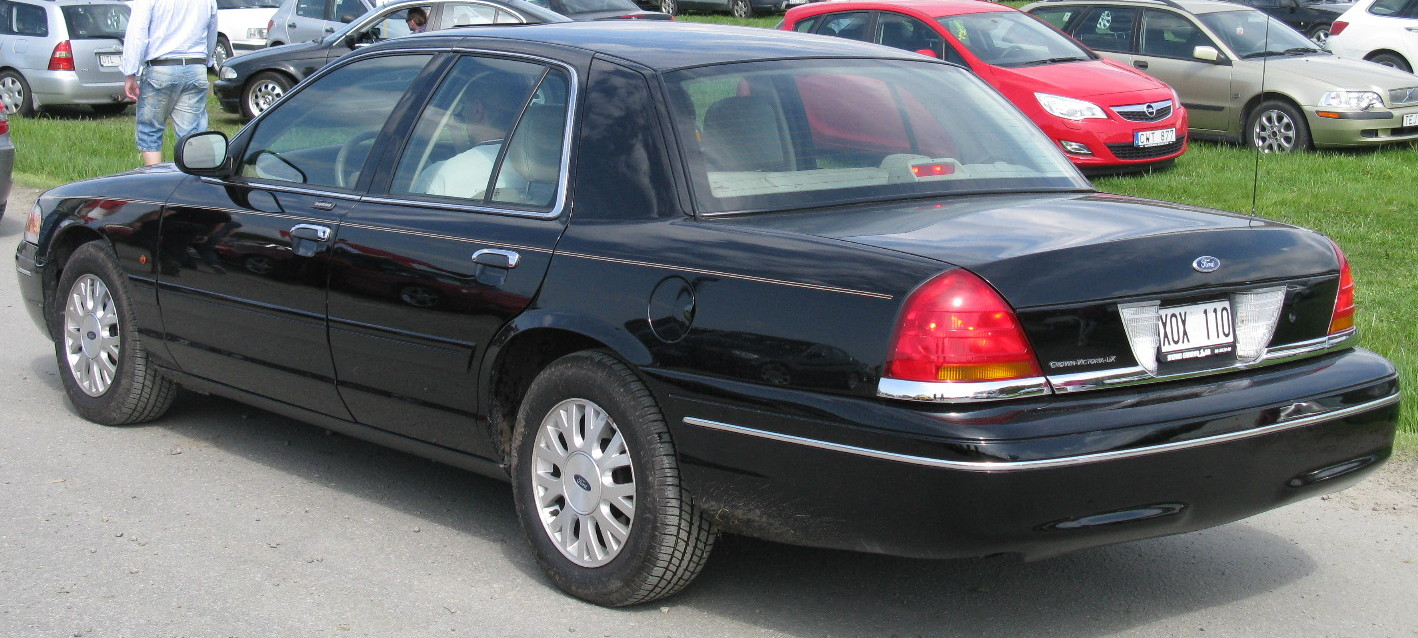
2005 Ford Crown Victoria LX Handling and Performance Package (European export version with amber turn signals)

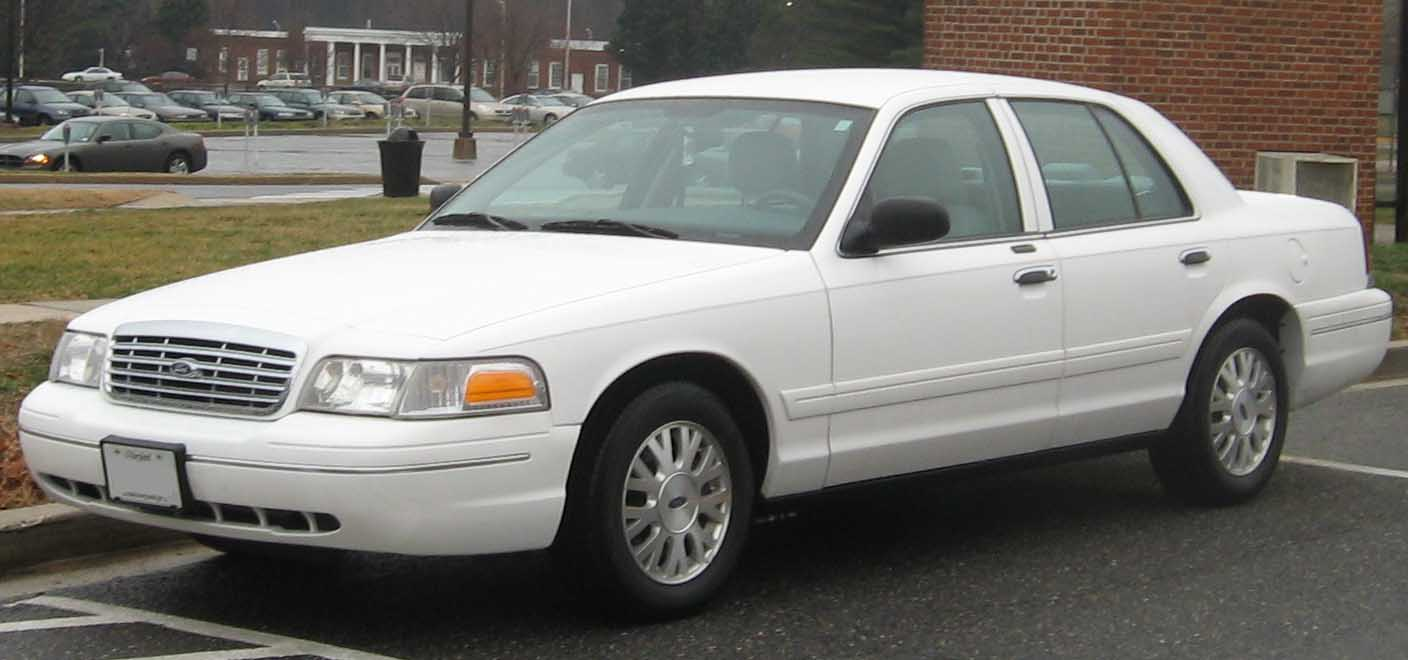
2003–04 Ford Crown Victoria LX Handling and Performance Package

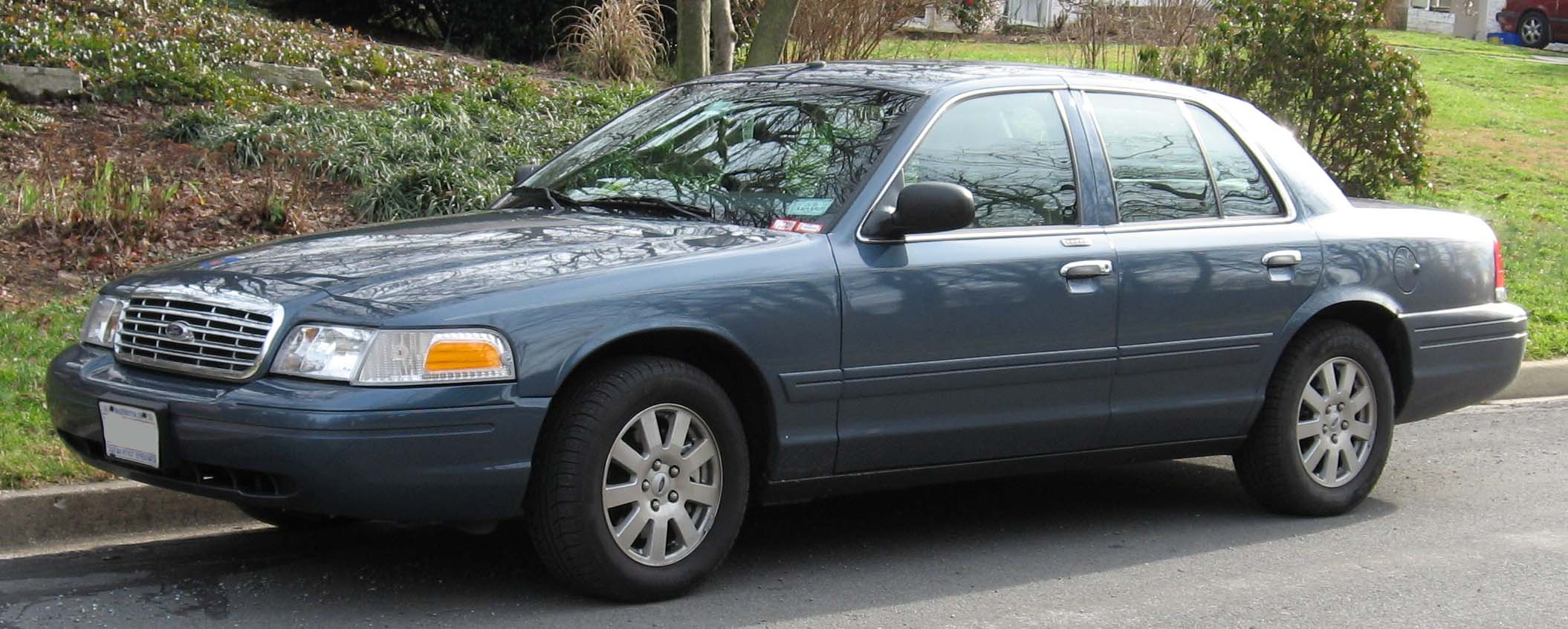
2006–07 Ford Crown Victoria LX Handling and Performance Package

=== Trim and variants ===
Carried over from the previous Crown Victoria, the second-generation Crown Victoria was marketed in two trim levels: Ford Crown Victoria (Base) and Ford Crown Victoria LX. The Police Crown Victoria was carried over, with Ford creating the Crown Victoria Police Interceptor as a stand-alone model for the 1999 model year.

Base - Included: Cloth upholstery, manual seats, power locks, key less entry, Securi-Lock anti-theft system (PATS), power windows with automatic drivers side window, solar glass, power remote control mirrors, illuminated entry, steel rims with hubcaps, air conditioning, battery saver, power trunk release, power steering, and an AM/FM stereo with clock (later, a cassette player was added, replaced by a single CD/cassette player, then a single-CD player). Later standard features were a power drivers seat and wiper-activated automatic headlamps. The base Crown Victoria was discontinued following the 2008 model year.

LX - Added: Luxury cloth upholstery, power drivers seat, alloy wheels, leather-wrapped steering wheel, an AM/FM stereo with a cassette player (later, a single CD/cassette player, then just a single-CD player), and illuminated mirrors. Leather seating, dual power seats, and eventually, a sunroof were all options on LX models. Several packages were offered for the LX over the course of the model run including an LX Comfort Package, Premier Package, Special Edition, and Sport (see below).

==== Handling and Performance Package ====
Carried over from the first generation, the Handling and Performance Package (option code 41G) was available on both base and LX models. It included dual exhaust, increased horsepower, shorter rear gears (3.27:1 for most years, 3.55:1 for 2000-mid 01), as well as an upgraded suspension with revised springs, shocks, larger sway bars, and rear air springs. The package also featured lacy-spoke wheels riding on P225/60TR16 tires, and external oil-to-air coolers for both the power steering and transmission. The package was restricted to LX models beginning in 2002. As part of the 2003 update, it received new 16x7 inch "snowflake" wheels. New nine-spoke 16x7 wheels were introduced for the 2006 model year, and the package was discontinued after the 2007 model year; it coincided with the end of retail sales for the model line.

==== LX Sport ====
Initially called Sport Appearance Package, it was introduced in 2001 as a counterpart to the Mercury Grand Marquis LSE. According to Ford, the trim package was aimed at buyers who sought style and improved features. The LX Sport featured all mechanical upgrades found on the Handling and Performance Package. It added an auto-dimming rear-view mirror, heated exterior mirrors, monochromatic exterior trim (on select colors), 17-inch “Sport” wheels, standard leather interior trim, a floor-mounted shifter with center console, front bucket seats, an AM/FM/CD/Cassette radio (the cassette player was eventually deleted), as well as steering wheel controls for the radio and climate control. The LX Sport was renamed to LX Premium Sport Handling and Performance Package in 2007; it was discontinued entirely mid-year 2008. A total of 14,777 LX Sport units were produced over the model run.

==== Crown Victoria Police Interceptor (1998–2011) ====
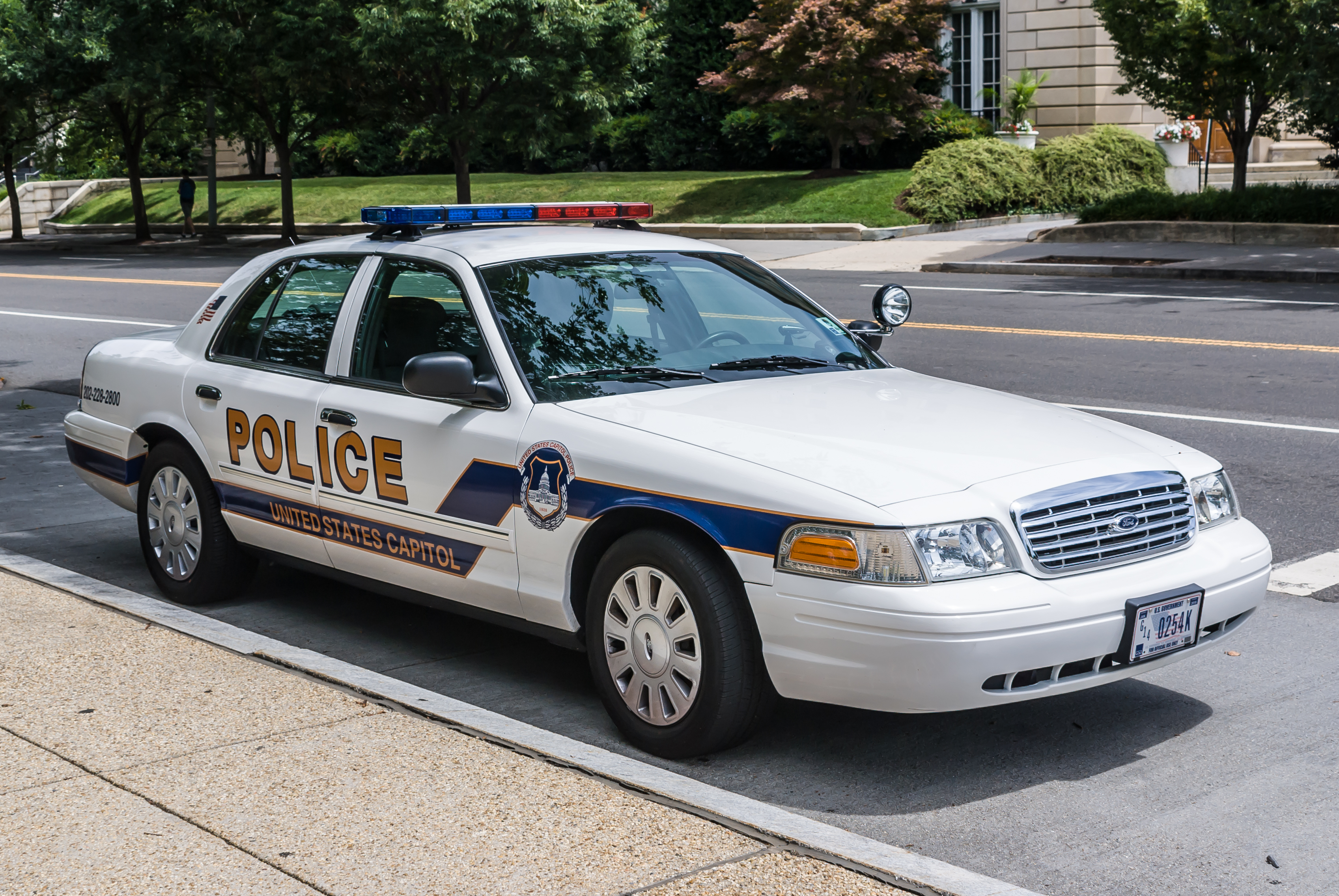
United States Capitol Police interceptor

Starting with the 1999 model year, the police version of the Crown Victoria, previously named Crown Victoria P71, was changed to Police Interceptor, and new rear badging was assigned instead of the standard Crown Victoria badge. However, the Crown Victoria badge was still affixed to Police Interceptors equipped with the optional Street Appearance Package for vehicles that required ordinary styling. Compared to the standard Crown Victoria, Police Interceptor models had a host of heavy-duty features that enabled them to be used for emergency response style driving and long idling times. Some of these features included heavy-duty suspension components, larger brakes, a bigger alternator, a shorter rear gear ratio and re-calibrated engine computer for improved acceleration, re-tuned steering with no variable assist, and an external engine oil-to-water cooler. The exterior largely featured black exterior trim with black steel wheels, with the exception of Street Appearance Package models, which donned chrome trim; they looked similar to a base Crown Victoria. During and shortly following its production run, it was the most popular police vehicle in the U.S. and became ubiquitous with law enforcement. Ford has replaced the Crown Victoria Police Interceptor with the Ford Police Interceptor Sedan and Ford Police Interceptor Utility, both of which are heavy-duty variants of the Ford Taurus and Ford Explorer, respectively.

The final Crown Victoria Police Interceptor was produced in August 2011 and purchased by the Kansas Highway Patrol.

==== Long Wheelbase (Taxi/Fleet) ====
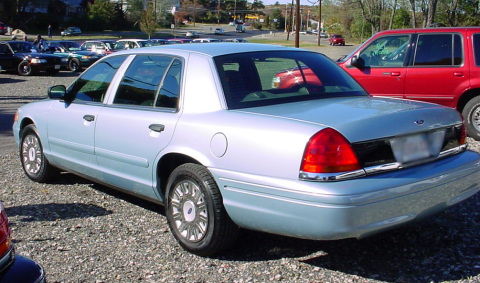
Extended Wheelbase Crown Victoria (US Spec)

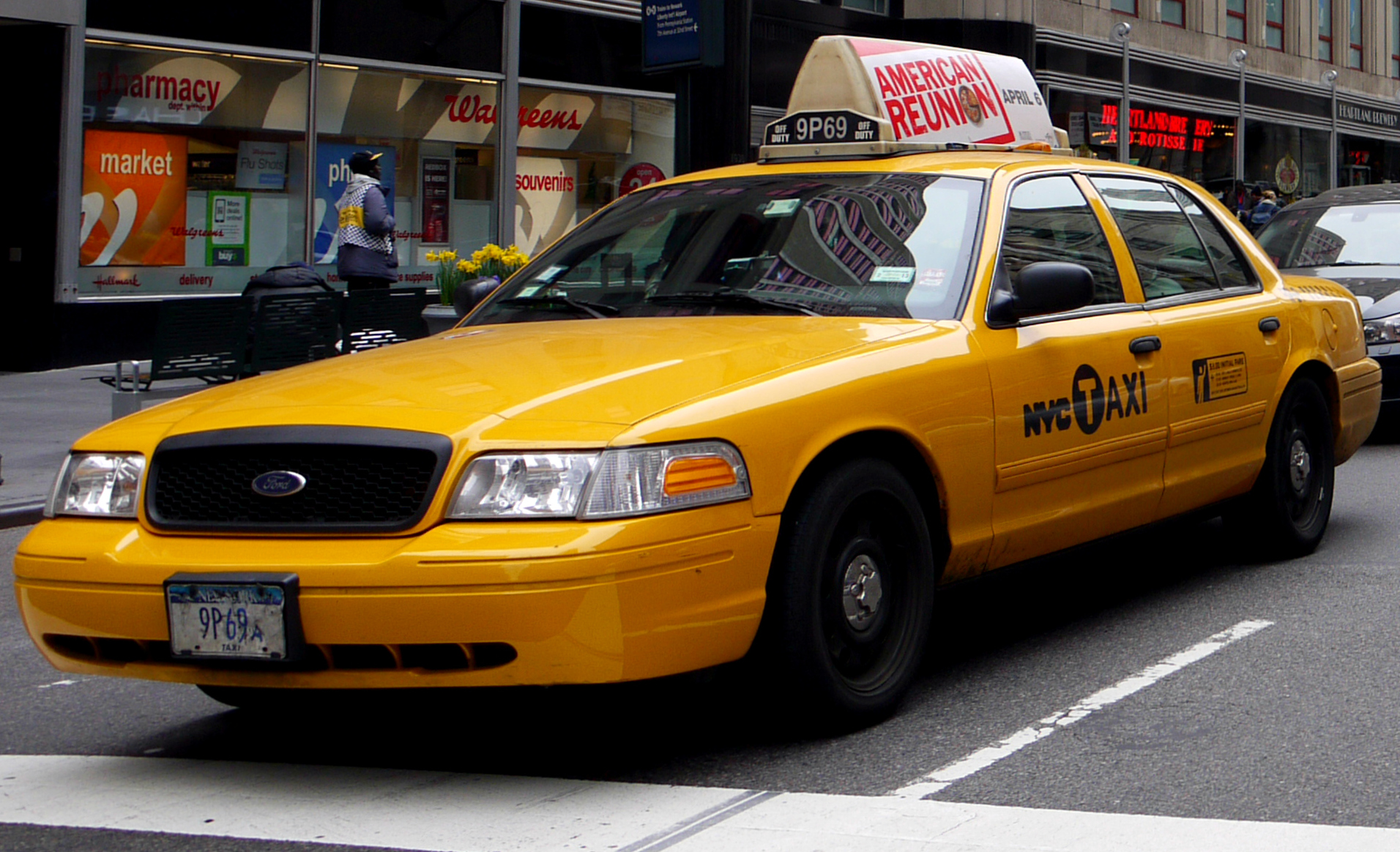
Ford Crown Victoria as a taxi in New York City in 2012

In 2002, Ford introduced a long-wheelbase version of the Crown Victoria featuring a six-inch extension to a 120.7-inch wheelbase. As with the extended-wheelbase Lincoln Town Car L, the long-wheelbase Crown Victoria was modified through the use of a longer frame and longer rear doors; all additional interior room was added to the rear seat. Unavailable on retail Crown Victoria models, the seating surfaces had the option of being entirely vinyl, the rear seats had their own HVAC vents with dual on/off switches, and strap handles were added to the rear door panels. Additionally, the long-wheelbase Crown Victoria featured several heavy-duty features to accommodate use in taxi applications including heavy-duty front springs and shocks; a rear stabilizer bar; auxiliary oil to air coolers for both the power steering and transmission; steel wheels (shared with the Police Interceptor); frame reinforcements in critical locations; and a heavy-duty battery. Beginning in 2006, an engine idle hour meter, similar to that found in the Police Interceptor, was made standard equipment. On the exterior, the chrome trim was deleted in favor of all-black trim, like the Police model.

While not offered for retail sale in North America, the long-wheelbase Crown Victoria was available for fleet sales targeting the taxi and livery markets. From 2002 to 2006, a special-service version was offered for law-enforcement sale (though not as a Police Interceptor) with chrome street-appearance trim from 2002 to 2004. For GCC export (see below), Ford offered long-wheelbase versions of both the Crown Victoria and Mercury Grand Marquis for retail sale.

==== Short Wheelbase (Fleet) ====
A short-wheelbase fleet model, with many of the same features as the long-wheelbase version, was available for sale beginning in 2002. Like its long wheelbase counterpart, it was not available for retail sale.

=== End of retail sales and transition to fleet sales (2008–2011) ===
In 2006, after factoring out fleet/Police Interceptor sales (95% of production), retail sales of the Crown Victoria dwindled to 3,000 (coming within 1,100 units of the Ford GT), outsold by its Mercury Grand Marquis counterpart by an 18-to-1 margin. For 2008, Ford ended retail sales of the Crown Victoria in the United States, removing the model from its website (later replacing it with the newly revived 2008 Ford Taurus). Ford Fleet sales continued the marketing of the Police Interceptor and commercial (taxi/fleet/LWB) variants. Subsequently, the only retail market selling the Ford Crown Victoria was the GCC/Middle East, with the Crown Victoria sold alongside the Mercury Grand Marquis.

For 2009, the Crown Victoria model line underwent a consolidation, as the LX became the sole version of the standard-wheelbase Crown Victoria (alongside the standard Fleet model and Police Interceptor).

For 2010, the Crown Victoria saw changes to its long-running VIN designation for each trim:

Years	Original Designation/Trim	New VIN Designation
2002-2009	P70/Long Wheelbase	P7A (2010-2011)
1998-2009	P71/Police Interceptor	P7B (2010-2011)
2002-2009	P72/Short Wheelbase Fleet	P7C (2010-2011)
1998-2008	P73/Base	Discontinued after 2008.
1998-2009	P74/LX	P7E (2010-2012)

=== Export ===
==== Canada ====
Ford of Canada (the official manufacturer of the Crown Victoria, Police Interceptor, and Mercury Grand Marquis) marketed the Ford Crown Victoria in Canada through the 1999 model year. For the 2000 model year, the Crown Victoria was replaced in retail markets by the Mercury Grand Marquis (sold at Ford dealerships); the Crown Victoria was restricted to fleet sales (consisting largely of the Police Interceptor).

After the 2011 model year, Ford of Canada ended sales of the Grand Marquis, Crown Victoria, and Crown Victoria Police Interceptor; their lack of stability control precluded further official sales in Canada. All three model lines were replaced by the sixth-generation Ford Taurus.

==== Middle East (GCC) ====
Through its production, the Ford Crown Victoria was exported to the Gulf Cooperation Council nations alongside its Lincoln-Mercury counterparts. In a region favoring full-size sedans (among other vehicles), the Crown Victoria became popular, as buyers of the region favored its durability, reliability, and ease of use (in comparison to German and British luxury vehicles), along with its lower price. As American nameplates shifted to newer vehicles (with the introduction of the Chrysler 300C, Dodge Charger, and the Chevrolet Caprice becoming a variant of the Holden Caprice), during the 2000s, the Crown Victoria, Grand Marquis, and Lincoln Town Car, while still popular, began to lose market share, primarily due to their age.

Panther-chassis sedans destined for Middle East export were referred to as "GCC-Spec" vehicles. Five versions of the Crown Victoria were available: Standard, Sport, Long-wheelbase, LX, and LX Sport. Unlike the United States and Canada, the long-wheelbase Crown Victoria was available for retail sale. In Kuwait, where the Crown Victoria was outsold by the higher-trim Mercury Grand Marquis, only the Standard and Long-wheelbase versions were sold after 2000 (the LX was discontinued in 1999).

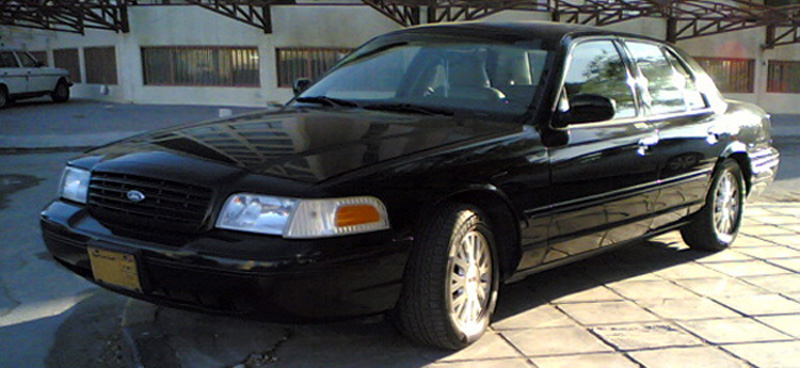
A 2003 Ford Crown Victoria LX Sport (Saudi Arabia-spec) in Kuwait

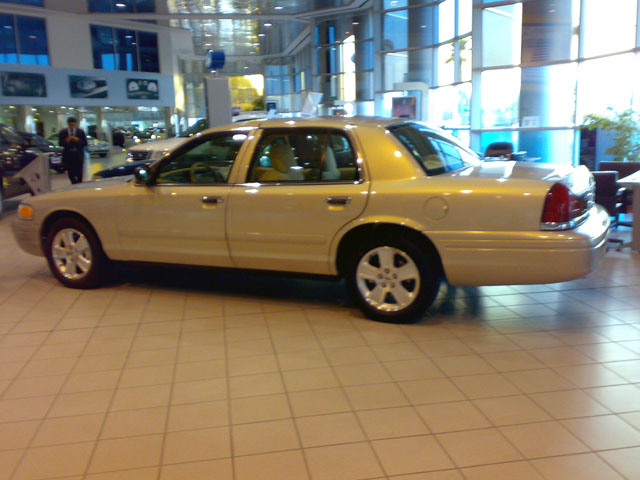
A 2008 Ford Crown Victoria LWB in a Kuwaiti Ford dealership

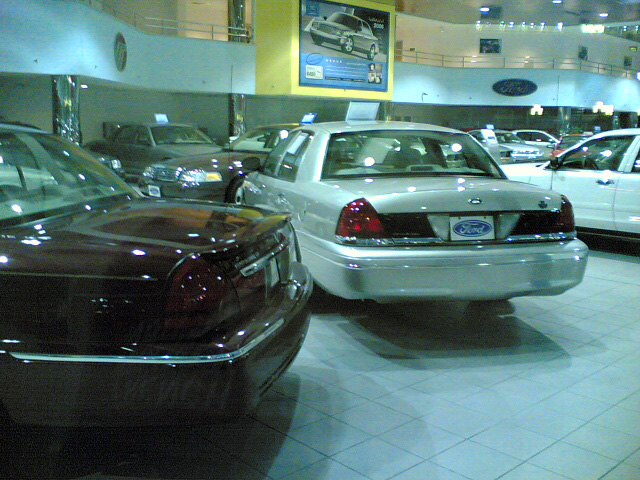
A 2006 Ford Crown Victoria Standard in a Ford/Mercury dealership in Kuwait

===== Modifications from North American vehicles =====
Along with a metric instrument panel, several modifications are made to the GCC-Spec Crown Victoria. In place of the 50/50 bench seat of the standard Crown Victoria, GCC-Spec vehicles use a 40/20/40 bench seat. Derived from the Lincoln Town Car, the front console assembly has air conditioning vents for the rear seats (except for LX Sport models), an eight-way driver's seat, a four-way manual passenger seat (an eight-way power seat as an option); seat upholstery is either cloth or leather. On all standard-wheelbase models, a true dual-exhaust system was fitted (not available on a U.S. Crown Victoria). On Standard and Standard Long-Wheelbase models, a driver's side spotlight assembly was optional. A DVD entertainment system (marketed as Export DVD Entertainment System) was added for the 2007 model year, it was optional on Sport, LX, and LX Sport models.

Differing from its North American counterpart, the warranty offered for a GCC-spec Crown Victoria was 5 years/200,000 kilometers (125,000 miles) – whichever came first.

Derived from the Mercury Marauder, a trunk-lid spoiler was either standard or an option on all standard-wheelbase models. For GCC-spec vehicles, the optional Handling and Performance Package (HPP) offered in the United States was rebranded the Export Handling Package (EHP). The EHP differed from the HPP largely by its retention of the 2.73:1 rear axle ratio (the base axle) and the use of a true dual exhaust system (standard equipment on all standard-wheelbase export versions). Included as part of the Sport and LX Sport trims (optional on the LX), the package includes a tuned rear air suspension, revised coil springs, handling shock absorbers, and a larger rear stabilizer bar. On GCC-Spec Crown Victorias, the EHP option is externally distinguished by a monochromatic paint scheme, with Ford offering Dark Toreador Red, Silver Birch, Tungsten, and Black as color choices.

===== 2008 Special Edition =====
With no major redesign of the Crown Victoria since 1998, to keep the model line competitive, the GCC importer of Ford vehicles designed a commemorative trim package for the 2008 model year. Exclusive to GCC-Spec Standard models, the cosmetic package added several cosmetic features, including a three-bar grille (in the style of the Ford Fusion), Mercury Marauder trunk lid spoiler (derived from EHP), chrome trim on the front and rear bumpers, "Special Edition" logos on the front fenders, trunk lid, and dashboard, as well as an AM/FM/CD Premium stereo.

All other features of the Special Edition are identical to the Standard-trim model. Not listed in any sales literature, it was available in a choice of three different colors. In Kuwait, the Special Edition was only available in black (due to market size); the price was about KWD 6,000 (roughly US$22,000). For 2009, the Special Edition was withdrawn.

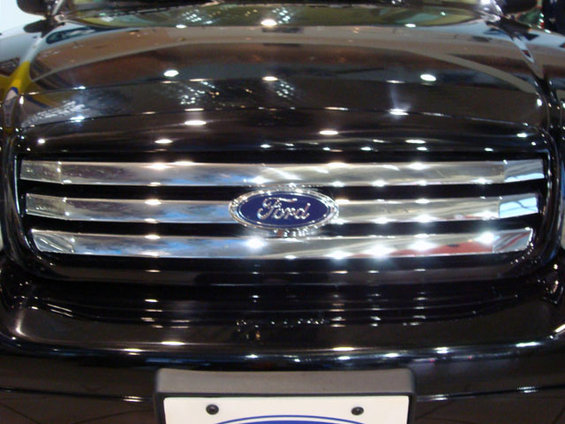
2008 Ford Crown Victoria Special Edition (GCC-Spec); grille

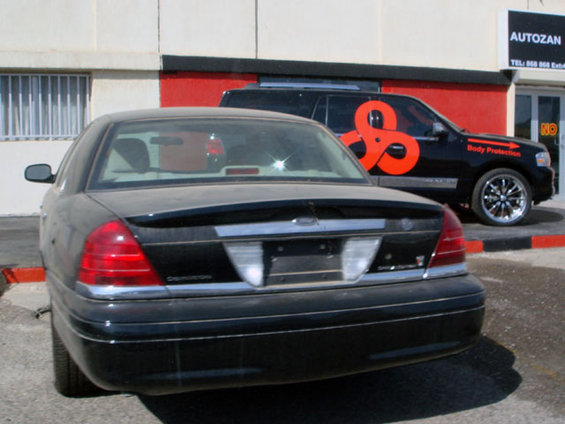
Rear of Special Edition, showing Mercury Marauder trunk-lid spoiler

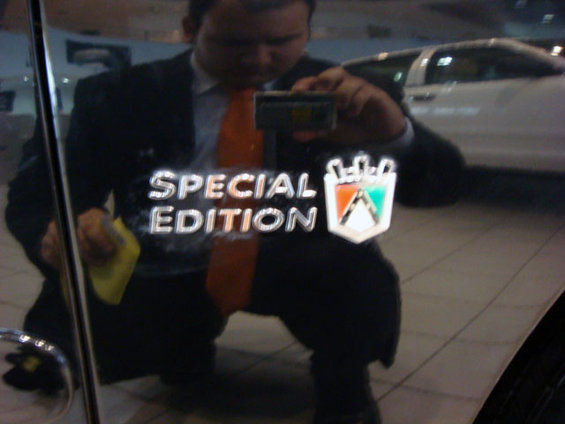
Special Edition fender badge

== Discontinuation and legacy ==
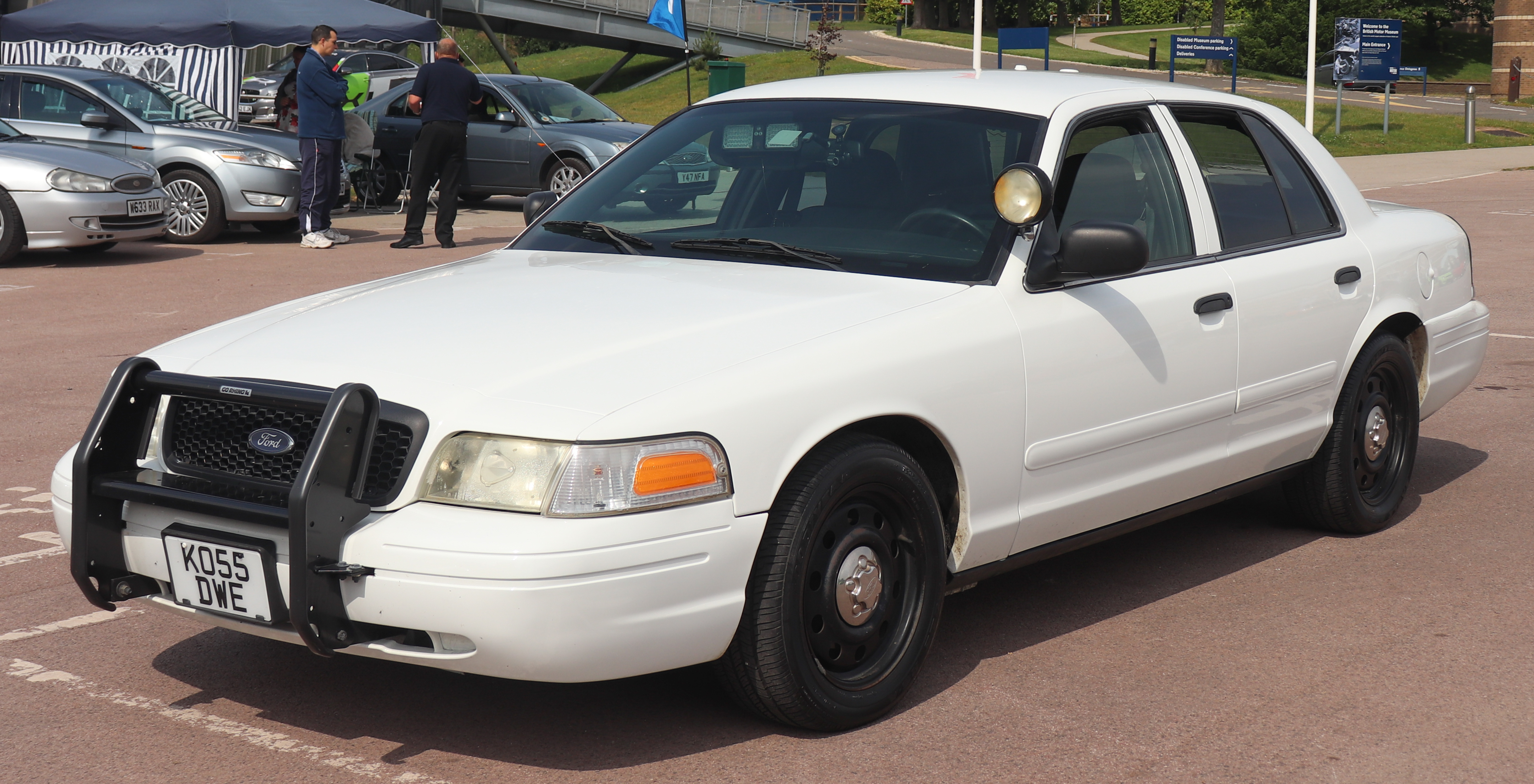
A retired 2006 CVPI that was purchased and exported to the United Kingdom by a private owner.

As part of The Way Forward plan of 2006, the St. Thomas Assembly Plant was switched to a single daily production shift in an effort to reduce operating costs. The plan also detailed that Ford would be closing 14 facilities in North America by 2012. It was estimated that the plan would save the company nearly US$ 5 billion, as its workforce would be reduced by roughly 30,000 employees. The Lincoln Town Car joined its Ford and Mercury counterparts in production at St. Thomas by 2008; the Wixom Assembly Plant, where it was produced, fell victim to the plan and ceased operations following the 2007 model year.

In 2008, Ford signaled that it would be closing the St. Thomas Assembly Plant in 2010. However, the Canadian Auto Workers Union successfully negotiated an extension to at least 2011. In 2009, Ford officially announced that the St. Thomas Assembly Plant would be closed in 2011, as Ford was hard hit by the 2008–2010 automotive industry crisis; it also affected demand for full size cars, which decreased significantly. Moreover, Ford offered retirement incentives to employees at the plant for up to $90,000, allowances up to $100,000, and vouchers for a new Ford vehicle.

Another reason why the Crown Victoria was discontinued was due to its lack of electronic stability control, which became federally mandated for all new vehicles in the US and Canada for the 2012 model year. As a result, the entire batch of 2012 versions were exported to the Middle East.

In April 2011, Ford stopped taking new orders for the Crown Victoria. In August 2011, a short production run of 2012 models destined for the Middle East commenced. Production of the Crown Victoria officially ended on September 15, 2011, at 12:25 PM EDT, when a white LX model rolled off the assembly line. It became the final Panther platform vehicle produced, the final full-size body-on-frame sedan produced, and the last vehicle to be produced by the St. Thomas Assembly Plant, which was closed immediately following the end of production for the model.

The Crown Victoria was the only Panther platform vehicle produced for the 2012 model year, with the Mercury Grand Marquis ending production on January 4, 2011, and the Lincoln Town Car following in suit on August 29, 2011; both ended production as 2011 models.

Taxi fleets revered the Crown Victoria, particularly in New York City, where it was the primary vehicle of its yellow cab fleet for over a decade. They were noted by operators for their durability, simplicity, and cost effectiveness. In 2007, NYC gathered stakeholders, taxi drivers, passengers, and other representatives to set goals that the next NYC yellow taxi should follow as part of the "Taxi of Tomorrow" program. When Ford announced the end of production for the Crown Victoria in 2009, the NYC Taxi and Limousine Commission promptly issued proposal requests to automakers, who submitted their ideas for a purpose-built taxi vehicle to the commission. On May 3, 2011, NYC officially announced that a purpose-built version of the Nissan NV200 minivan would become the successor to its fleet of Crown Victoria yellow cabs, and was selected over the Ford Transit Connect, as well as a minivan built by Turkish auto manufacturer Karsan.

However, the Crown Victoria remains popular in taxi use, as de-commissioned Police versions often end up being purchased and used by privately owned taxi and livery cab companies.

Police fleets also mourned the end of the Crown Victoria, as it became the primary police vehicle for most police fleets in the US following the discontinuation of the B-body Chevrolet Caprice in 1996. Some agencies have been reluctant to retire the last of their Crown Victoria fleet, as the model was the last traditional police vehicle (body-on-frame, full size sedan). Several departments such as the Los Angeles Sheriff Department, Austin, TX Police Department, and the Long Beach, CA Police Department stockpiled the Crown Victoria during its final model year, as they were hesitant to adopt new models. As of December 2023, the Los Angeles Sheriff Department still had over 400 CVPI's in service, as they ordered a batch of 600 units immediately before new orders ceased in 2011. According to the department, the CVPI has held up well over the years, and is still a go to choice for tenured deputies working in the department.

Between 1991 and 2011, the St. Thomas Assembly Plant produced over 1.5 million examples of the Crown Victoria, second only to its Mercury counterpart, which saw more than 1.7 million examples produced by the plant in that timespan.

== Safety concerns and issues ==
=== Fuel tank ===
Reports that Crown Victorias were more prone to fires during rear collisions were a simple combination of three things. First, most law-enforcement agencies relied on the Crown Victoria as their primary vehicle, meaning that any police-related auto accident was very likely to involve a Crown Victoria. Second, the accidents often occurred as the result of the officers intentionally parking their vehicles close to active traffic to shield stopped motorists, something most regular drivers would never do. Third, the impacting vehicle was often traveling at, or above, the posted legal limit (around 65 to 75 mph (105 to 121 km/h) in most jurisdictions).

The condition was exacerbated by police equipment installers drilling over the package tray in the luggage compartment. Due to the gas tank's orientation, drilling through the package tray may result in drilling into the gas tank. Installers also used screws set directly into the bulkhead and facing the fuel tank. In the event of a high-energy collision, these screws could be forced into the tank, both rupturing the tank and possibly acting as a spark source. The use of long bolts for mounting heavier equipment was also suspected. The manufacturer provided an aftermarket shield to help prevent these items from puncturing the tank during impact. Further, many investigations, both performed by federal/state agencies, and the police department themselves, have found that removable items in the trunk were improperly stowed. These items became tank-piercing projectiles during rear-collision scenarios. Ford's second solution came in the form of a recall kit including patterns to mark unsafe areas (to drill) in the luggage compartment. Also included were rubberized Kevlar and hard ballistic nylon shields for the differential cover lower shock bolts. They also included a Kevlar-based trunk liner. Ford used similar kits on early-1980s model passenger vehicles. For 2005 and newer models, Ford offers an optional onboard fire-suppression system for the Crown Victoria Police Interceptor units. The system itself is integrated with the antilock braking system as part of the activation and can be activated manually. However, Ford does cite several system limitations regarding fuel loss and impact speeds.

Despite numerous court cases charging Ford with partial liability for fires caused in accidents, the company has never been found liable in a Crown Victoria accident.

=== Steering shaft recall ===
In September 2013, Ford issued a recall for 370,000 Ford Crown Victoria, Mercury Grand Marquis, and Lincoln Town Car vehicles built between 2005 and 2011, due to the possibility of steering shaft corrosion. According to Ford, the corrosion could cause loss of steering, potentially leading to a crash. Vehicles sold in the following states were covered by the recall: Connecticut, Delaware, D.C., Illinois, Indiana, Iowa, Kentucky, Maine, Maryland, Massachusetts, Michigan, Minnesota, Missouri, New Hampshire, New Jersey, New York, Ohio, Pennsylvania, Rhode Island, Vermont, Virginia, Wisconsin, and West Virginia. 15,000 of the affected vehicles were also sold in Canada. Ford recommended that dealers inspect the vehicles and replace the steering intermediate shaft, lower steering column bearing, and upper intermediate shaft, if necessary.

=== Light Control Module (LCM) ===
On April 14, 2017, Ford issued a recall for approximately 313,000 2003-05 Ford Crown Victoria and Mercury Grand Marquis models due to an issue with the Light Control Module, which could result in a loss of the headlamp function. According to Ford, the solder joints on the module could crack and interrupt power to the headlamps. The dealer will inspect and replace the module, free of charge.

=== Rear axle ===
Certain 2003 model vehicles produced before January 2003 could develop issues with the rear axle. The axle may not have been properly heat treated from the factory, leading to premature wear. The issue mostly affected fleet and police models. Dealers sometimes treated this as a silent recall for non-fleet vehicles.

=== Intake manifold ===
Model years from 1996 through 2001 using an all-composite intake manifold manufactured by DuPont were subject to coolant leaks. Cracks would develop along the thermostat housing area, causing antifreeze leaks and overheating issues. Misfires have also been reported, as leaking anti-freeze may seep down into the spark plug wells. For 2002, a revised intake manifold with a bolt-on aluminum thermostat housing and anti-freeze crossover was produced and fitted to all new vehicles in an attempt to remedy the issue. The new intake was more reliable, however, these intake manifolds also proved to be problematic. Another common failure point on the intake is the rear heater hose fitting, located in front of the passenger-side firewall. The fitting used an integral plastic nipple to connect the heater return hose to the heater core. This fitting has been known to break off from the intake manifold, causing rapid antifreeze loss. Late in 2005, Ford settled a class-action lawsuit regarding the intake manifold.

== Horsepower and torque ratings ==
Years	Power	Torque	Notes
1992-1995	190 hp (142 kW)	260 lb⋅ft (353 N⋅m)	Single exhaust.
1992-1995	210 hp (157 kW)	270 lb⋅ft (366 N⋅m)	Dual exhaust.
1996-1997	190 hp (142 kW)	265 lb⋅ft (359 N⋅m)	Single exhaust.
1996-1997	210 hp (157 kW)	275 lb⋅ft (373 N⋅m)	Dual exhaust.
1998-2000	200 hp (149 kW)	275 lb⋅ft (373 N⋅m)	Single exhaust.
1998-2000	215 hp (160 kW)	285 lb⋅ft (386 N⋅m)	Dual exhaust.
2001-2002	220 hp (164 kW)	265 lb⋅ft (359 N⋅m)	"Performance Improved" heads; single exhaust.
2001-2002	235 hp (175 kW)	275 lb⋅ft (373 N⋅m)	"Performance Improved" heads; dual exhaust.
2003-2012	224 hp (167 kW)	272 lb⋅ft (369 N⋅m)	Engine knock sensor; "Performance Improved" heads; single exhaust.
2003-2011	239 hp (178 kW)	287 lb⋅ft (389 N⋅m)	Engine knock sensor; "Performance Improved" heads; dual exhaust.
2004-2011	250 hp (186 kW)	297 lb⋅ft (403 N⋅m)	Police only, Mercury Marauder-style air intake, 80mm mass airflow sensor.

== Sales ==
Calendar year	American sales
1993	101,685
1994	103,040
1995	98,163
1996	108,789
1997	107,872
1998	111,531
1999	114,669
2000	92,047
2001	95,261
2002	79,716
2003	78,541
2004	70,816
2005	63,939
2006	62,976
2007	60,901
2008	48,557
2009	33,255
2010	33,722
2011	46,725
2012	4,429
