= Essex Engine Plant =

Automobile manufacturing facility in Windsor, Ontario, Canada

Coordinates: 42°17′46″N 82°56′3″W

Essex Engine Plant is a Ford factory located in Windsor, Ontario, Canada. It currently produces Ford's 5.0L V8 engine. The plant was built in 1981 to produce Ford's Essex V6 engine.

== Closing and reopening ==
In 2006, Ford announced that the plant would close as part of Ford's The Way Forward plan. The plant closed in 2007. The plant produced V6, V8, and V10 engines, cylinder heads, crankshafts and cylinder blocks for a variety of Ford vehicles before its closure. With financial assistance from Canadian governments, CA$16.8 million from the province of Ontario in 2008 and CA$80 million from the Government of Canada over five years, the plant reopened in February 2010 to produce the new 5.0L version of the Ford Modular engine. In 2010, Ontario announced a further contribution of CA$81 million to the Essex Engine Plant.

As of 2014, there were about 1,400 active Ford workers at the Essex Engine and Windsor Engine plants, a drop from 6,300 Ford workers at six engine and engine parts plants 2000, according to president of Unifor local 200. There were about 640 workers assembling about 970 engines a day before a third shift was added around April 2012. In May 2007, Ford closed the Windsor Casting Plant, which was opened in 1934. The plant most recently produced cylinder block castings for 4.2-liter V-6 engine and crankshafts for 4.2-liter V-6, 5.4-liter V-8, 3.0-liter V-6, 4.6-liter V-8 and 2.3-liter engines. It once was one of the largest recyclers of iron and steel in southern Ontario. In March 2012, Ford closed the Windsor Aluminum Plant which produced Duratec engine block.

== Products ==
- 3.8L/3.9L/4.2L V6 (1981–2007)
- 5.0L V8 (2009–present)

== See also ==
- List of Ford factories
