= The Way Forward =

Ford's 2006 business restructuring plan

In 2006, the Ford Motor Company made public a restructuring plan named 'The Way Forward'.

The plan aimed to reduce fixed capital costs while allowing Ford to maintain a special focus on cars and car-based crossover vehicles. Over time, the company had hoped to make more of its product line profitable instead of relying on a limited portion of the products for profit. Making satisfactual profits across the product line required that the company decrease the economical impact of development and production while introducing new products that aimed to appeal to buyers.

In the latter half of 2005, Chairman Bill Ford asked the newly appointed Ford Americas Division President Mark Fields, to develop a plan to return the company to profitability. Fields previewed the plan at the December 7, 2005 board meeting of the company, and it was unveiled on January 23, 2006 to the public. The plan was later revised on September 15, 2006 to accelerate plant closures.

The plan included resizing the company to match market realities, dropping some unprofitable and inefficient business models, consolidating production lines, and shutting down seven vehicle assembly plants and seven parts factories. Among these were St. Louis Assembly in Hazelwood, Missouri, Atlanta Assembly in Hapeville, Georgia, Batavia Transmission in Batavia, Ohio, Windsor Casting in Windsor, Ontario, Canada, and Wixom Assembly in Wixom, Michigan. Up to 30,000 hourly and salaried jobs (28% of the total workforce) in North America over the next six years were expected to be eliminated, which is comparable to similar cutbacks previously announced at General Motors. These cutbacks were consistent with Ford's roughly 25% decline in U.S. automotive market share since the mid-late 1990s.

New cars were developed faster using the new Global Product Development System (GPDS). This brought Ford's cycle time closer to its Japanese rivals. Ford also announced that every vehicle in the Ford and Lincoln line up would be built on one of its nine new global platforms, cutting costs significantly. A new style for all Ford and Lincoln vehicles was introduced as Ford wanted "an unmistakable Ford or Lincoln look".

In addition to said plant closures, the plan also resulted in divestitures; for instance, a joint venture with Mahindra and Mahindra Limited of India ended with the sale of Ford's 15 percent stake in 2005. It also included the sale of wholly owned subsidiary Hertz Rent-a-Car to a private equity group for $15 billion in cash and debt acquisition. The sale was completed on December 22, 2005.

While Ford had projected returning to profitability sometime after 2010, they beat this goal, and received their first profit in 2009.

== Plant closings ==
Ford planned to close 14 manufacturing plants by 2012 including 7 that assembled cars. Short-term results (by 2008) reduced Ford's assembly capacity by 26%.

The first closures were announced on January 23, 2006. Ford announced on April 13, 2006 that two more plants would close as well. The plan was accelerated with a mid-September announcement which accelerated the closure of the Norfolk plant and added the Essex engine and Maumee stamping plants to the list.

Date announced	Plant name	Location	Date of closing	Products	Employees
January 23, 2006	St. Louis Assembly	Hazelwood, Missouri	2006	Ford Explorer; Lincoln Aviator; Mercury Mountaineer	1,445
January 23, 2006	Atlanta Assembly	Hapeville, Georgia	Oct. 2006	Ford Taurus; Mercury Sable	2,028
January 23, 2006	Batavia Transmission	Batavia, Ohio	2008	transmissions	1,745
January 23, 2006	Windsor Casting	Windsor, Ontario, Canada	2008	Engine blocks, parts	684
January 23, 2006	Wixom Assembly	Wixom, Michigan	June 2007	Lincoln Town Car; Lincoln LS; Ford GT	1,567
April 13, 2006	Twin Cities Assembly	St. Paul, Minnesota, USA	2011	Ford Ranger; Mazda B-Series	1,885
April 13, 2006	Norfolk Assembly	Norfolk, Virginia, USA	2007	Ford F-Series	2,433
September 14, 2006	Essex Engine	Windsor, Ontario, Canada	2008	Ford Triton engine Ford Essex V6 engine	
September 14, 2006	Maumee Stamping	Maumee, Ohio	2008	body panels	
Total					11,787

Ford has kept the Essex Engine plant open to produce the 5.0 V8.

== Product replacements ==
The following products were assembled at the Wixom (Michigan) Assembly plant, which was closed. In June 2006, Ford announced that it will not move production to St. Thomas, Ontario, Canada (where its body-on-frame platform-mates Ford Crown Victoria and Mercury Grand Marquis are produced), likely meaning that Town Car production would end permanently. Ford eventually changed its mind, announcing in September that it would move the Town Car after all. As of 2011, production of the Town Car has been canceled, with the MKT crossover intended as its replacement for livery fleets.

Date announced	Product	End of production	Replacement
January 23, 2006	Ford GT	September 21, 2006	Shelby Cobra GT500
January 23, 2006	Lincoln LS	April 2006	Lincoln MKZ; Lincoln MKS
January 23, 2006	Lincoln Town Car	June 2007	Assembly to be moved

== Staff reductions ==
Up to 30,000 factory jobs would be eliminated with the downsizing envisioned in The Way Forward. The company also eliminated 4,000 salaried, contract, and agency jobs during the first quarter of 2006, and the company eliminated six or seven corporate officer positions out of 53 immediately.

Ford reportedly offered severance packages of up to $100,000 for workers who are willing to give up all future benefits except their pension. The company would also pay up to $15,000 in tuition for workers returning to school. Workers over 55 were reportedly offered a $35,000 bonus to retire early, provided they had 30 years of service with the company, and those with 28 years can get leave and 85% pay for two years.

== Divestment ==
Ford's plan called for divesting, selling, and closing some businesses in order to raise cash.

- Jaguar Cars and Land Rover — On 2 June 2008, Ford sold both of its British operations to Tata Motors of India for a cost of £1.7 billion.
- Aston Martin — On 12 March 2007, a British consortium led by Dave Richards of Prodrive purchased the iconic automaker for £479 million.
- Automobile Protection Corporation — Extended warranty company APCO will also be sold
- Mazda — On November 18, 2008, Ford announced that it would be selling a 20% stake in Mazda, bringing its stake to 13.4%, and surrendering control of the company.
- Mercury — On June 2, 2010, Ford officially announced the closure of Mercury by the end of Q4 of 2010.

== New products ==
Product plans reportedly called for more crossover SUVs, compact cars, and hybrid vehicles.
