= Windsor Casting =

Coordinates: 42°17′47″N 82°55′59″W

Windsor Casting Plant was an iron foundry owned by Ford Motor Company in Windsor, Ontario, Canada. The plant opened November 9, 1934 and was located next to the Windsor Engine Plant in downtown Windsor. It was known to area residents as "the foundry". Internally, it was called WCP.

Operations ceased on May 29, 2007 as part of Ford's "The Way Forward" plan.

During its time in operation, it was one of Canada's largest recyclers. It recycled any kind of scrap metal with iron in it. In 1998, the foundry used the scrap metal from the demolition of neighbouring Windsor Engine #1 to cast 175,000 engine blocks. Although being considered an outdated facility, WCP was frequently awarded with many quality and environmental awards.

Windsor Casting and the adjacent engine plant were the original production location and namesake for the Windsor V8 engine.

== Plant facts ==
Size:

- 500,000 square feet (46,000 m^{2}) on a 22-acre (9 ha) site

Employees at time of closure:

- approximately 560 hourly, 40 salaried

Products at time of closure:

- cast iron cylinder blocks – 4.2-liter V6
- crankshafts – 3.9-liter V6, 4.2-liter V6, 5.4-liter V8, 3.0-liter V6, 4.6-liter V8, 2.3-liter I4

Past products:

- brake drums
- cylinder heads
- camshafts
- bearing caps
- exhaust manifolds
- cranks for AMC

Production:

- 91,000 tonnes of molten metal poured per year
- about 500,000 engine blocks per year
- two million crankshafts produced each year for seven models, ranging from 22-pound to 38-pound crankshafts for everything from small inline four-cylinder engines to V-8s
- largest recycler of iron and steel in Southern Ontario. All the steel used in cylinder blocks and crankshafts produced is recycled.

== See also ==
- List of Ford factories
