= Range Rover Sport =

Mid-size luxury SUV

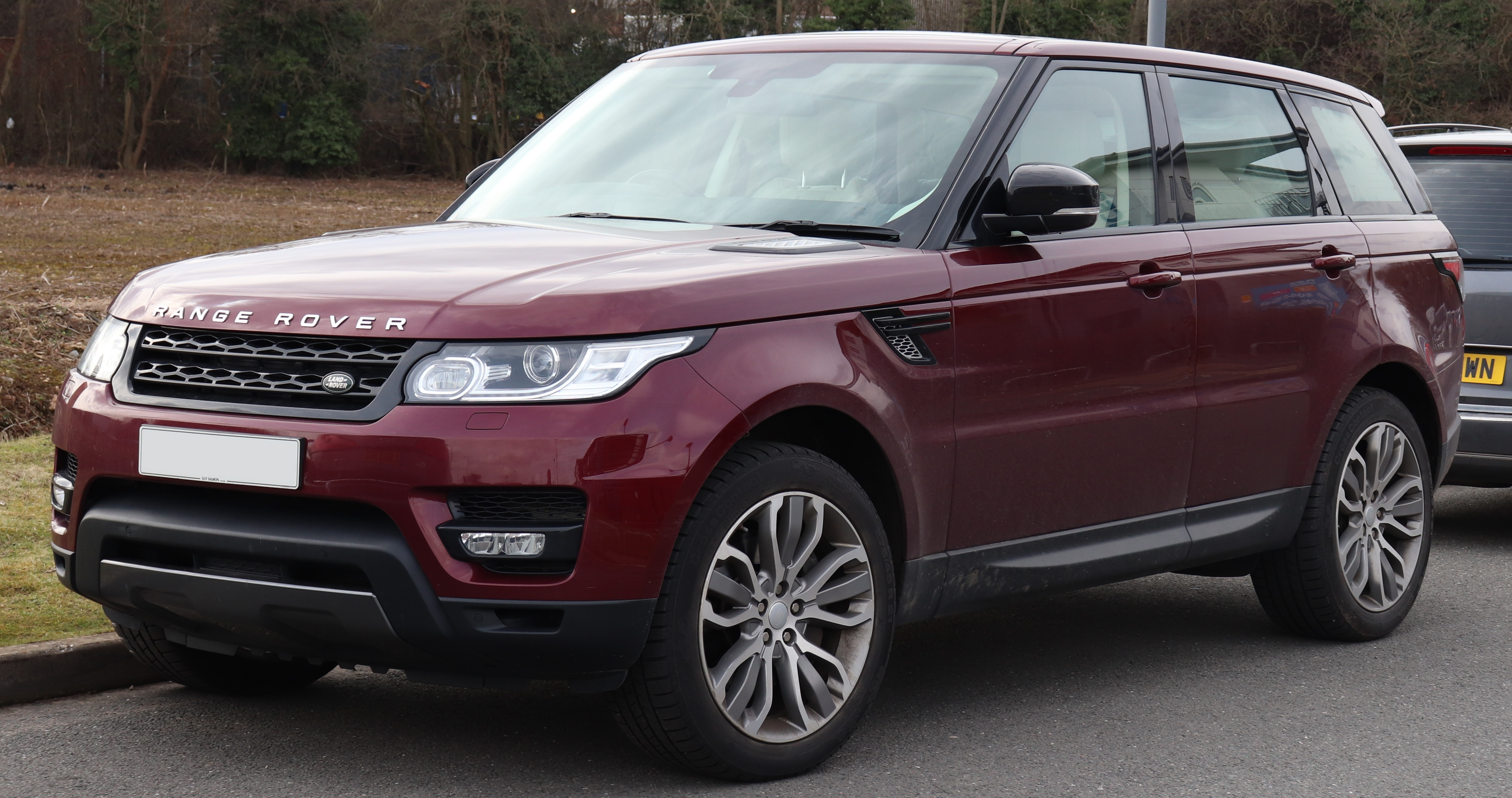

Overview
- Manufacturer: Land Rover Ltd. (2005–2012); Jaguar Land Rover (2013–present)
- Production: 2005–present
- Designer: Gerry McGovern (2nd and 3rd generation)

Body and chassis
- Class: Mid-size luxury 4x4
- Body style: 5-door 4x4
- Layout: Front-engine, four-wheel-drive

Chronology
- Successor: Range Rover (L460) (for the 7-seater version)

The Range Rover Sport, is a mid-size luxury SUV (Sports Utility Vehicle) produced by the British manufacturer Land Rover, part of Jaguar Land Rover, at the Solihull plant. Introduced in 2005 with the first-generation L320 model, it was succeeded by the second-generation L494 in 2013, and the third-generation L461 in 2022.

== Range Stormer concept ==
The Range Rover Sport was prefigured by the Range Stormer concept car, and it was introduced at the 2004 North American International Auto Show.

This was a low-slung, short wheelbase, 3-door coupé that was unusually "sporty" in the context of Land Rover's history. Designed by Richard Woolley, the marque's first complete concept car sported split-folding gullwing doors, one-piece skeletal seats, a "clamshell" bonnet, 22 inch alloys, a 289 km/h (180 mph) top speed, 4WD and a 2,500 kg (5,512 lb) weight. The Range Rover Sport was comparably of much more conservative design featuring five doors and a wheelbase hardly shorter than that of the Range Rover Vogue.

A replica of the Stormer was built by West Coast Customs of Corona, CA for Sheikh Hamdan bin Mohammed Al Maktoum, Crown Prince of Dubai, on the occasion of opening West Coast Customs Dubai; the car is currently registered under the Dubai Traffic And Road Authority.

The Range Stormer is now on display at the Heritage Motor Centre in Gaydon, Warwickshire, UK.

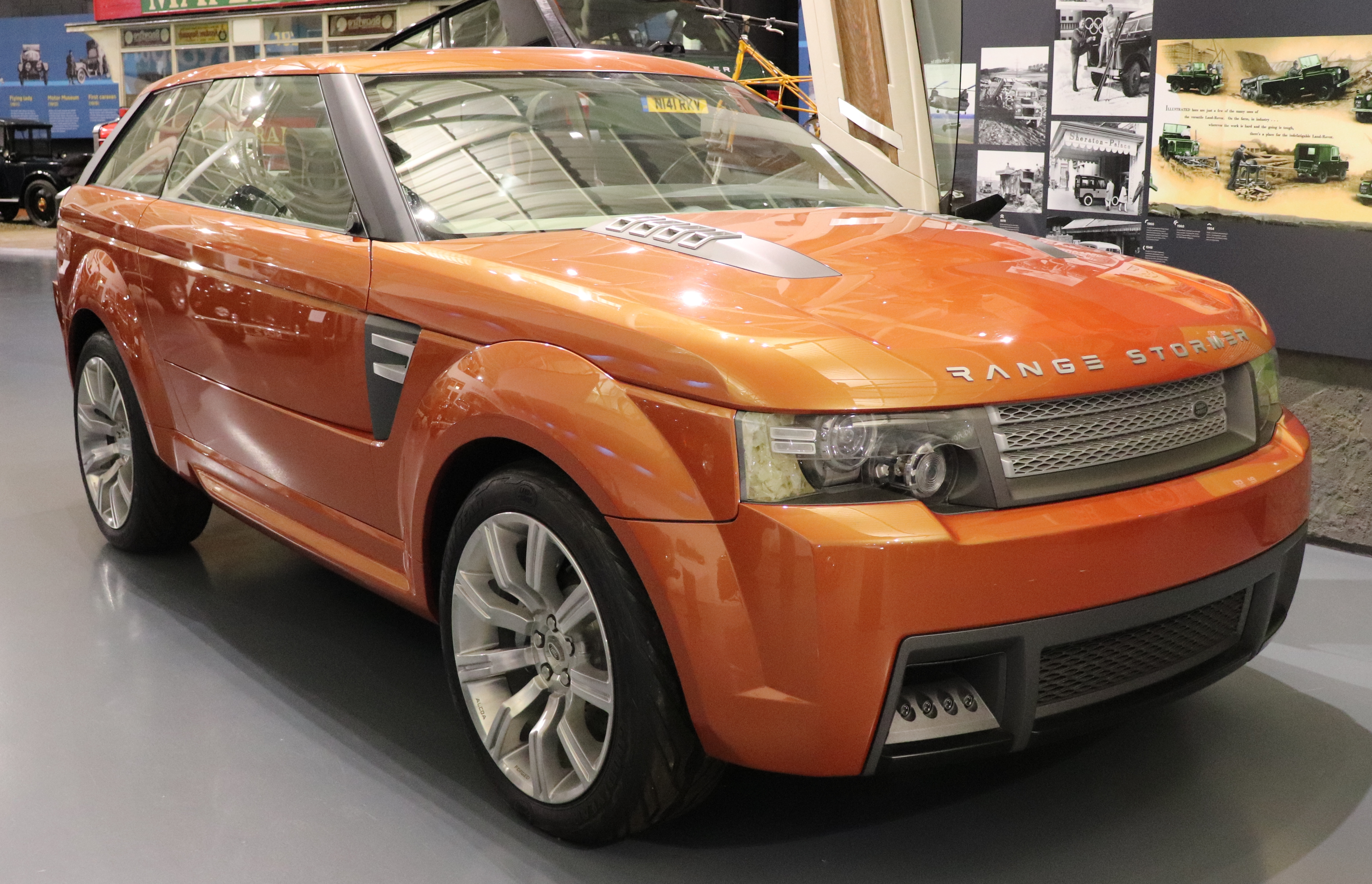
Range Stormer concept displayed in the BMM, Gaydon

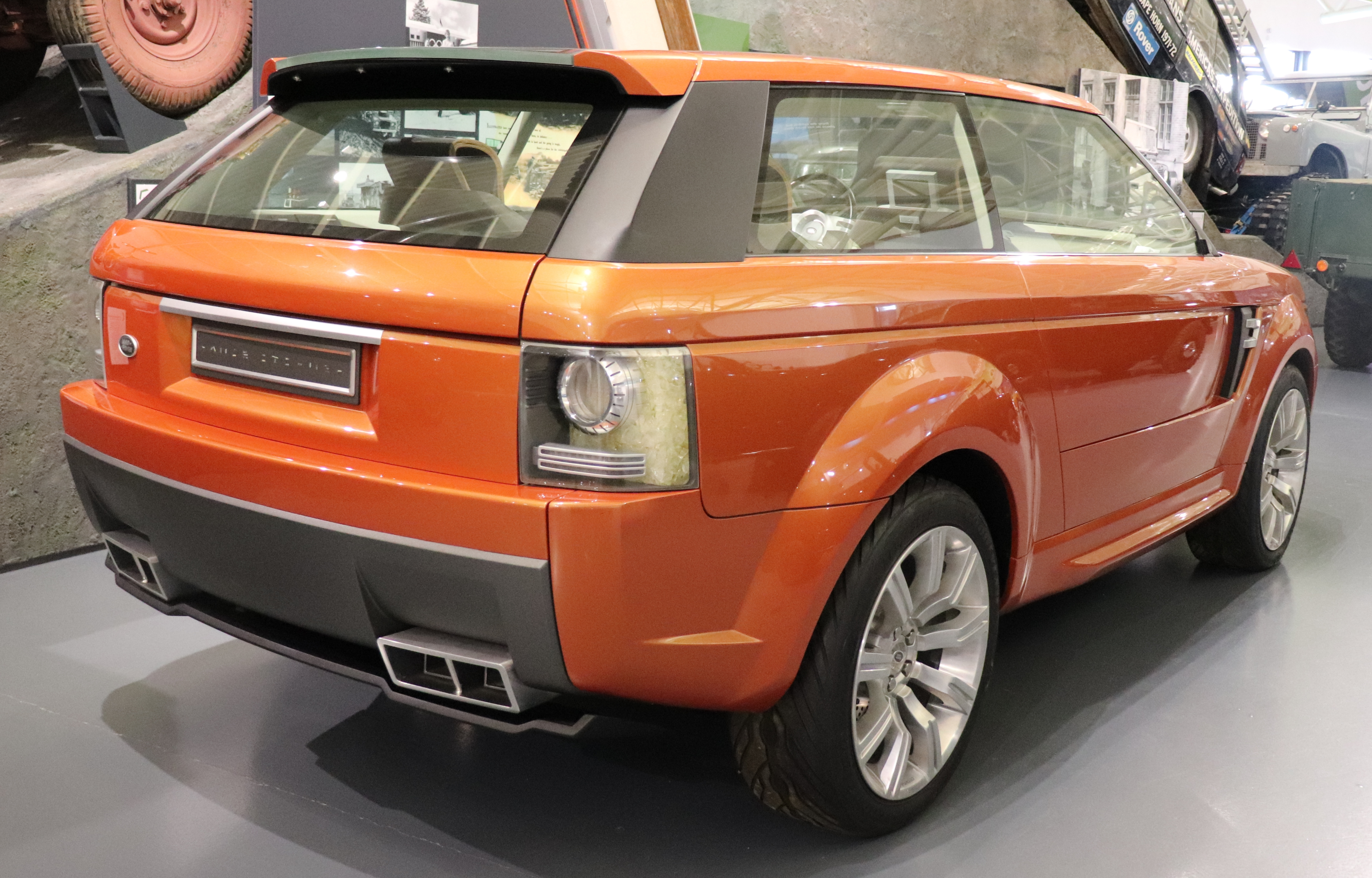
Rear

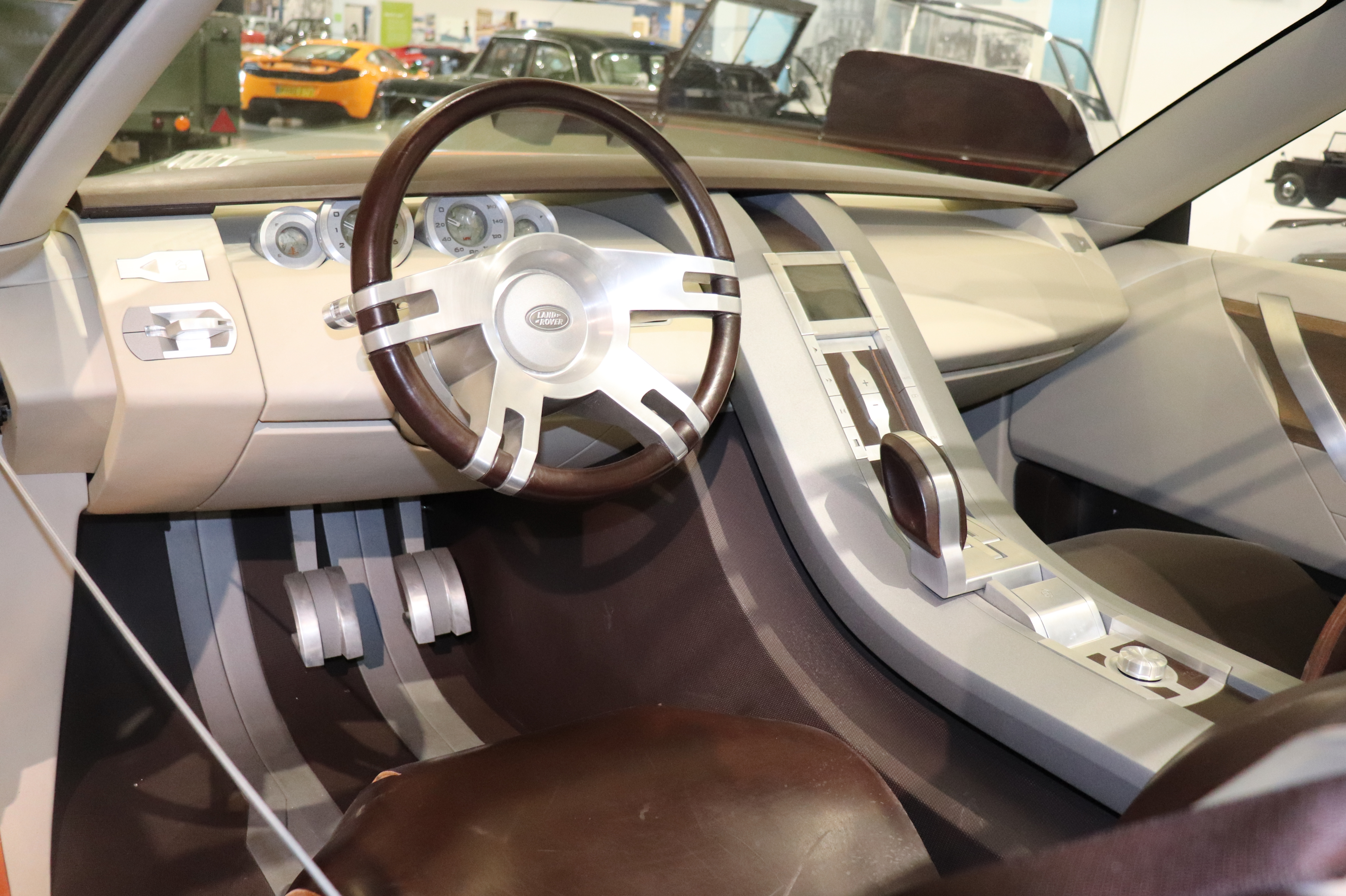
Interior

== First generation (L320; 2005) ==
First generation

Overview
- Model code: L320
- Production: 2005–2013 (413,841 produced)
- Model years: 2006–2013
- Assembly: United Kingdom: Solihull (Solihull plant)

Body and chassis
- Related: Land Rover Discovery (L319)

Powertrain
- Engine: Petrol: 4.2 L AJ Supercharged V8; 4.4 L AJ V8; 5.0 L AJ V8; 5.0 L AJ Supercharged V8; Diesel: 2.7 L Lion turbo V6; 3.0 L Lion turbo V6; 3.6 L Lion twin-turbo V8
- Transmission: 8-speed automatic 6-speed ZF automatic 6-speed ZF HP28 automatic

Dimensions
- Wheelbase: 2,745 mm (108.1 in)
- Length: 2005–2009: 4,737 mm (186.5 in); 2009–2013: 4,783 mm (188.3 in)
- Width: 2005–2009: 1,928 mm (75.9 in); 2009–2019: 1,933 mm (76.1 in)
- Height: 1,816 mm (71.5 in)

=== Chassis ===
The chassis of the Range Rover Sport was adapted from the integrated bodyframe, semi-monocoque, independently suspended design which debuted on the Discovery 3 in 2004. This allegedly gives the Range Rover Sport the refinement and structural rigidity advantages of a monocoque chassis with the robustness of a separate chassis design for off-road applications. It also allows for less expensive manufacturing of the vehicles due to a large number of common components. Although sitting on a modified version of the Discovery 3's chassis, it is smaller than its more utilitarian sibling in every dimension with a wheelbase shorter by 140 mm (5.5 in). Its smaller dimensions and its raked roofline make it impossible to accommodate third-row occupants like the Discovery 3, but as a sports tourer it was never intended to be a seven-seater. Brembo front brakes are standard on the V8 Supercharged and TDV8, but were an option with the dynamic package on TDV6 and naturally aspirated V8 petrol.

=== Powertrain ===
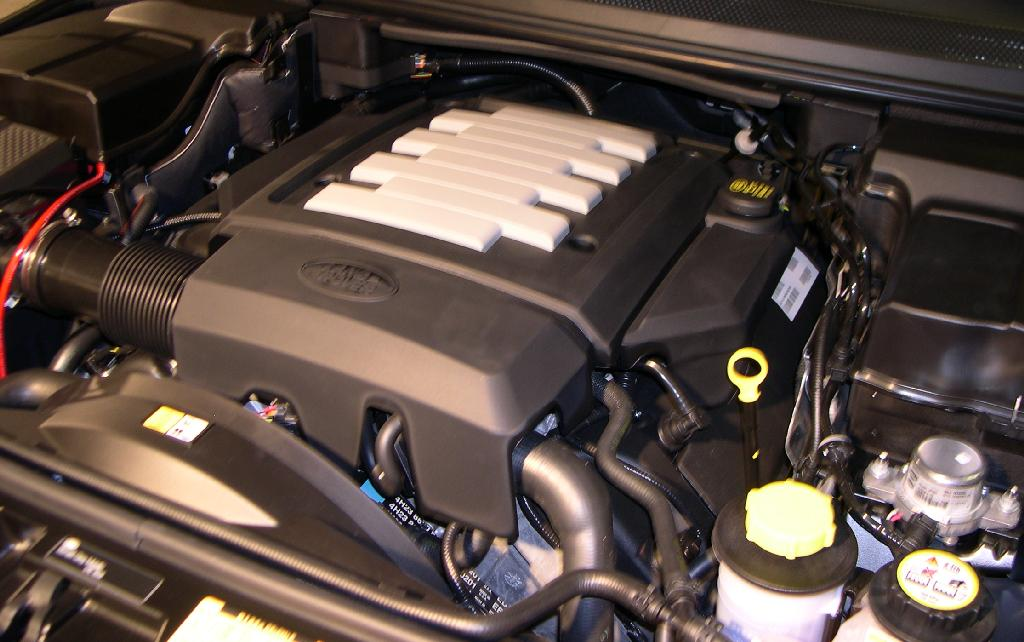
Engine

The 2005–2009 Range Rover Sport HSE is powered by a naturally aspirated 4.4-litre Jaguar AJ-V8 engine producing 300 hp (224 kW) and 425 N⋅m (313 lb⋅ft), with the Supercharged model getting a supercharged 4.2-litre variant producing 385 hp (287 kW) and 550 N⋅m (410 lb⋅ft). Both petrol engines have been designed with a sump and oil pick-up system to allow for operation at extreme angles. Due to lack of popularity, the naturally aspirated power plant was omitted from the UK market in 2007. For 2010, these two powerplants were replaced by a naturally aspirated 5.0-litre all-aluminium Jaguar AJ-V8 engine producing 370 hp (276 kW) and 510 N⋅m (380 lb⋅ft) for the HSE, and a supercharged 5.0-litre variant producing 510 hp (380 kW) and 625 N⋅m (461 lb⋅ft) on Supercharged models. The advanced 2.7-litre turbodiesel TDV6 is an adaptation of the PSA/Ford development and produces 190 hp (142 kW) and 440 N⋅m (325 lbf⋅ft) in Land Rover guise. It features a compacted graphite iron block and aluminium cylinder head with fast switching piezo crystal injectors. Debuting in both the Sport and the flagship Range Rover in 2007 was the 3.6-litre twin turbodiesel TDV8. This engine is a further adaptation of the TDV6 but features a 90 degree block (as opposed to a 60 degree layout), twin variable geometry turbochargers and inlet valve deactivation. All engine variants are mated to an adaptive six-speed ZF 6HP transmission (ZF6HP26) ZF automatic transmission, except the SDV6, which received the ZF 8HP transmission (ZF8HP70). These gearboxes have a unique mode: CommandShift which reacts and adapts to varying driving styles. CommandShift gives the driver the freedom to sequentially manipulate gear changes.

Years	Model & transmission	Engine	Power	Torque	Top speed	0-62 mph (0–100 km/h)	Economy	CO_{2} emissions
Diesel
2005–2009	2.7 L TDV6 CommandShift	2.7 L, V6 turbodiesel	190 PS (140 kW; 187 hp)	440 N⋅m (325 lbf⋅ft)	120 mph (193 km/h)	11.9 s	28.2 mpg_{‑imp} (10.0 L/100 km; 23.5 mpg_{‑US})	265 g/km
2009–2013	3.0 L TDV6 CommandShift	3.0 L, V6 turbodiesel	211 PS (155 kW; 208 hp)	520 N⋅m (384 lbf⋅ft)	120 mph (193 km/h)	10.3 s	33.2 mpg_{‑imp} (8.5 L/100 km; 27.6 mpg_{‑US})	224 g/km
2009–2013	3.0 L TDV6 CommandShift	3.0 L, V6 turbodiesel	245 PS (180 kW; 242 hp)	600 N⋅m (443 lbf⋅ft)	120 mph (193 km/h)	9.3 s	30.2 mpg_{‑imp} (9.4 L/100 km; 25.1 mpg_{‑US})	224 g/km
2006–2013	3.6 L TDV8 CommandShift	3.6 L, V8 twin-turbodiesel	272 PS (200 kW; 268 hp)	640 N⋅m (472 lbf⋅ft)	130 mph (209 km/h)	8.6 s	18.1 mpg_{‑imp} (15.6 L/100 km; 15.1 mpg_{‑US})	294 g/km
2011–2013	3.0 L SDV6 CommandShift	3.0 L, V6 turbodiesel	258 PS (190 kW; 254 hp)	600 N⋅m (443 lbf⋅ft)	124 mph (200 km/h)	8.9 s	25.4 mpg_{‑imp} (11.1 L/100 km; 21.1 mpg_{‑US})	230 g/km
Petrol
2005–2009	4.4 L V8 CommandShift	4.4 L, V8	300 PS (221 kW; 296 hp)	425 N⋅m (313 lbf⋅ft)	130 mph (209 km/h)	8.2 s	19.0 mpg_{‑imp} (14.9 L/100 km; 15.8 mpg_{‑US})	352 g/km
2005–2009	4.2 L V8 CommandShift	4.2 L, V8 supercharged	390 PS (287 kW; 385 hp)	550 N⋅m (410 lbf⋅ft)	130 mph (209 km/h)	7.1 s	18.0 mpg_{‑imp} (15.7 L/100 km; 15.0 mpg_{‑US})	327 g/km
2009–2013	5.0 L V8 CommandShift	5.0 L, V8	375 PS (276 kW; 370 hp)	510 N⋅m (376 lbf⋅ft)	130 mph (209 km/h)	7.3 s	20.3 mpg_{‑imp} (13.9 L/100 km; 16.9 mpg_{‑US})	327 g/km
2009–2013	5.0 L V8 CommandShift	5.0 L, V8 supercharged	510 PS (375 kW; 503 hp)	625 N⋅m (461 lbf⋅ft)	140 mph (225 km/h)	5.9 s	17.8 mpg_{‑imp} (15.9 L/100 km; 14.8 mpg_{‑US})	374 g/km

=== Suspension ===
Air suspension, as standard, gives the driver the option of three ride height settings including a standard ride height of 172 mm (6.8 in), an off-road height of 227 mm (8.9 in) and a lowered access mode. There is also an extra height available which is accessed by holding the respective button for when the off-road ride height is not enough. When the vehicle bellies out, its control system will sense weight being lessened on the air springs and the ride height is automatically raised to the suspensions greatest articulation. The cross-link aspect of the suspension system, which debuted on the L322 Range Rover in 2002, results in better off-road performance by electronically operating valves in pneumatic lines which link adjacent air springs. In the event of a wheel on one side being raised when travelling off-road, the pneumatic valves are opened and the adjacent wheel is forced down, simulating the action of a live axle setup.

==== Terrain Response ====
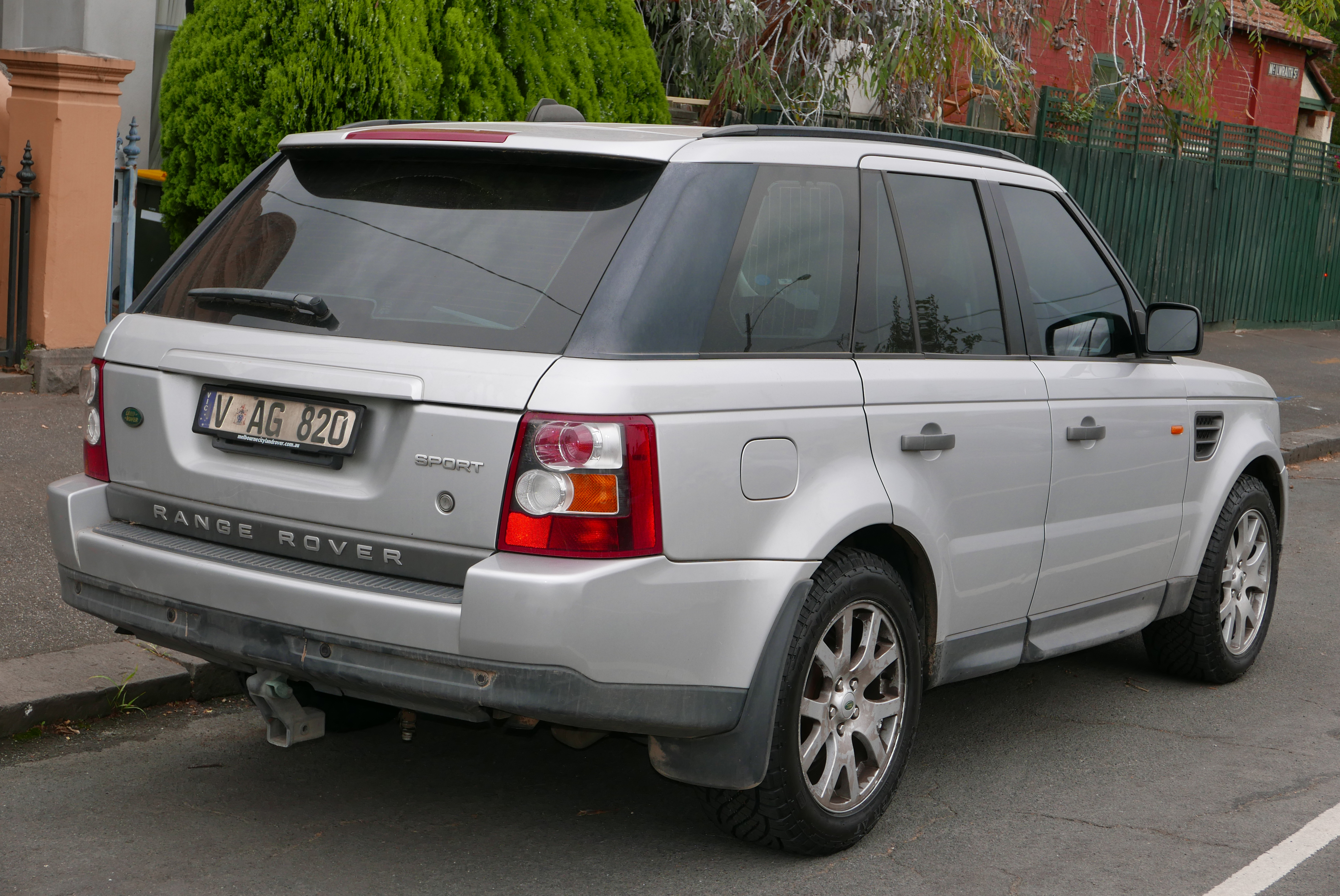
Pre–facelift Range Rover Sport TDV6

Land Rover's patented Terrain Response system which debuted on the Discovery 3 is fitted as standard on all models. In the L320 Terrain Response allows the driver to select each of the five additional modes using a switch, pressing left or right to select the mode, in the L494 Terrain Response 2 allows the driver to adjust chassis and transmission settings (five settings) to suit the terrain being traversed via a rotary knob on the centre console. These include general driving; grass, gravel, snow; mud and ruts; sand; and rock crawl. Suspension ride height, engine management, throttle mapping, transfer case ranges, transmission settings, electronic driving aids (such as electronic traction control (ETC), dynamic stability control (DSC) and hill descent control (HDC)) and electronic e-diffs are all manipulated through the Terrain Response system. All Range Rover Sports are equipped with a standard centre e-diff from Magna Steyr Powertrain which electronically locks and unlocks and apportions torque via means of a multi-plate clutch pack located in the transfer case which also offers 'shift-on-the-move' dual-range operation. A rear e-diff is optional on all Range Rover Sport models and is able to lock and unlock instantaneously. An in-dash display is available which, among other things, is linked to Terrain Response and displays important off-road information such as the status of the e-diffs, the angle of the steering and wheel articulation. It is also able to inform the driver of wheels which do not have contact with the ground.

=== Driving technologies ===
Dynamic Response incorporates electrohydraulic active anti-roll bars which react to cornering forces and activate and deactivate accordingly resulting in sublime on-road handling. Dynamic Response also aids off-road performance by decoupling the anti-sway bars to allow maximum wheel articulation. The system in an evolution of the acclaimed ACE (Active Cornering Enhancement) system available on the Discovery Series II but is described as proactive rather than reactive. Positive Torque, a system standard on all TDV8 and Supercharged models, electronically blips the throttle, resulting in faster downshifts and the availability of vast reserves of torque. The speed sensitive steering system, adopted from Jaguar is standard on all models and there's the option of active bi-xenon headlamps which act with the angle of the steering to aid vision. Active Cruise Control (ACC) with Forward Alert system incorporates an integrated front bumper radar which detects vehicles travelling ahead and adapts the vehicle's speed to match. The system scans the road ten times a second, has a 16 degree field of view and Land Rover claims it is able to discriminate between a heavy vehicle and an adjacent lane motorcycle travelling at least 180 metres (590 ft) ahead. Four preset distances are selectable and will ensure the Sport maintains the desired distance from the vehicle it is following.

=== Safety ===
The NCWR organisation (New Car Whiplash Ratings) tested the Range Rover Sport in 2010 and awarded it the following scores:

NCWR	Score
Geometric:	G
Dynamic:	A
Overall:	A

G = Good, A = Acceptable, M = Marginal, P = Poor

=== Security ===
The Range Rover Sport was tested by Thatcham's New Vehicle Security Ratings (NVSR) organisation and achieved the following ratings:

NVSR	Rating
Theft of car:	5/5 stars
Theft from car:	4/5 stars

=== Facelift (2009) ===
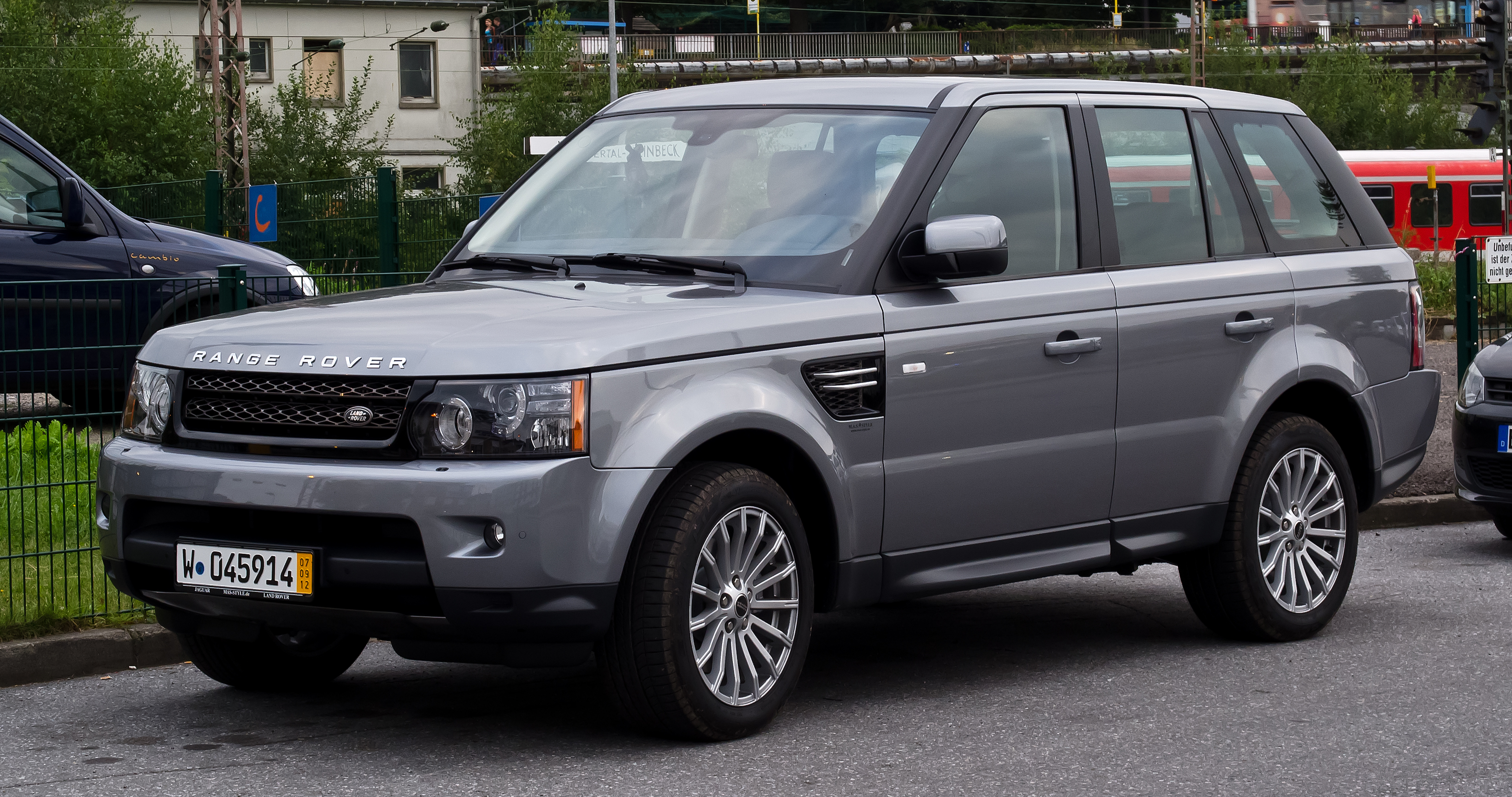
2009 facelift

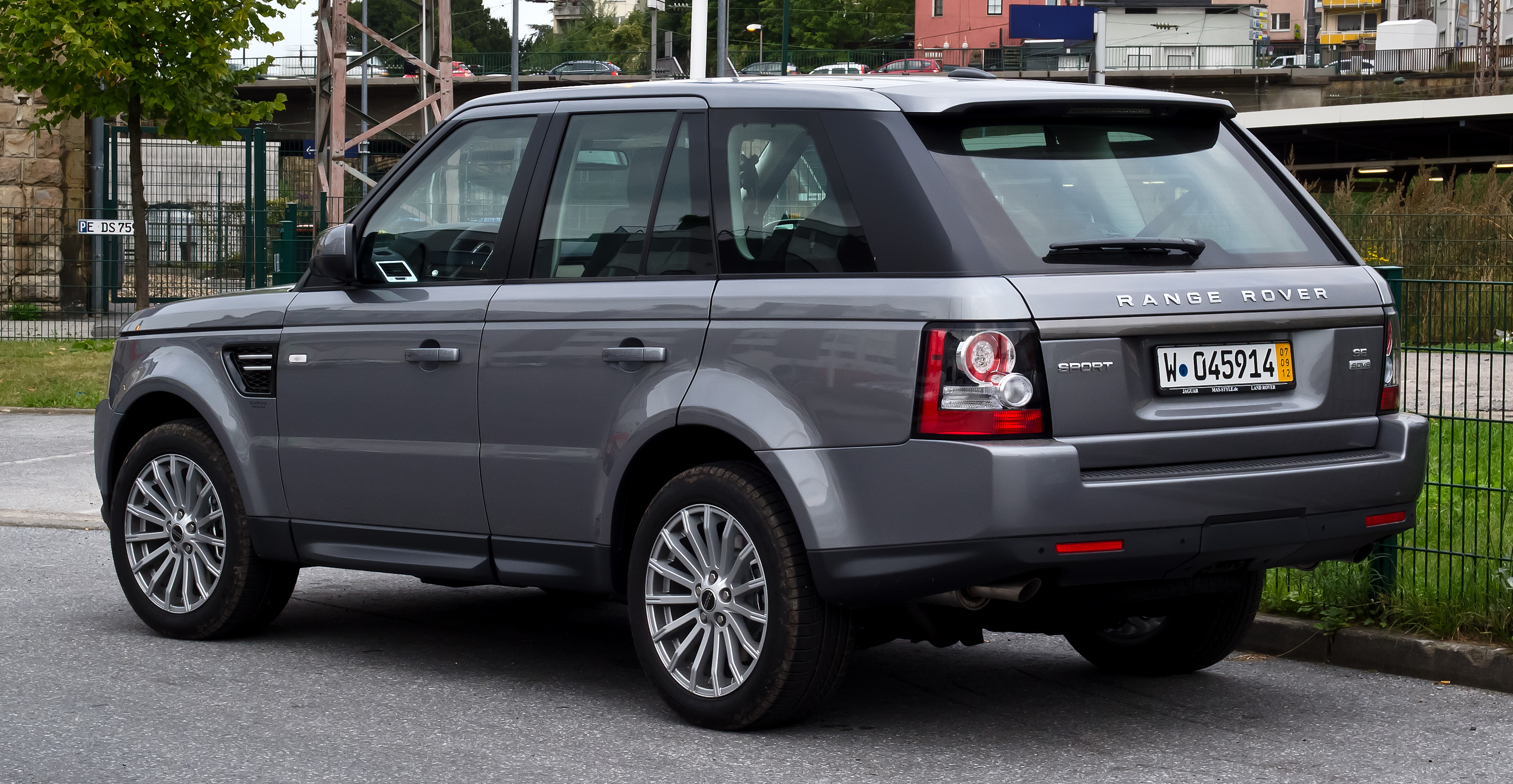
2009 facelift

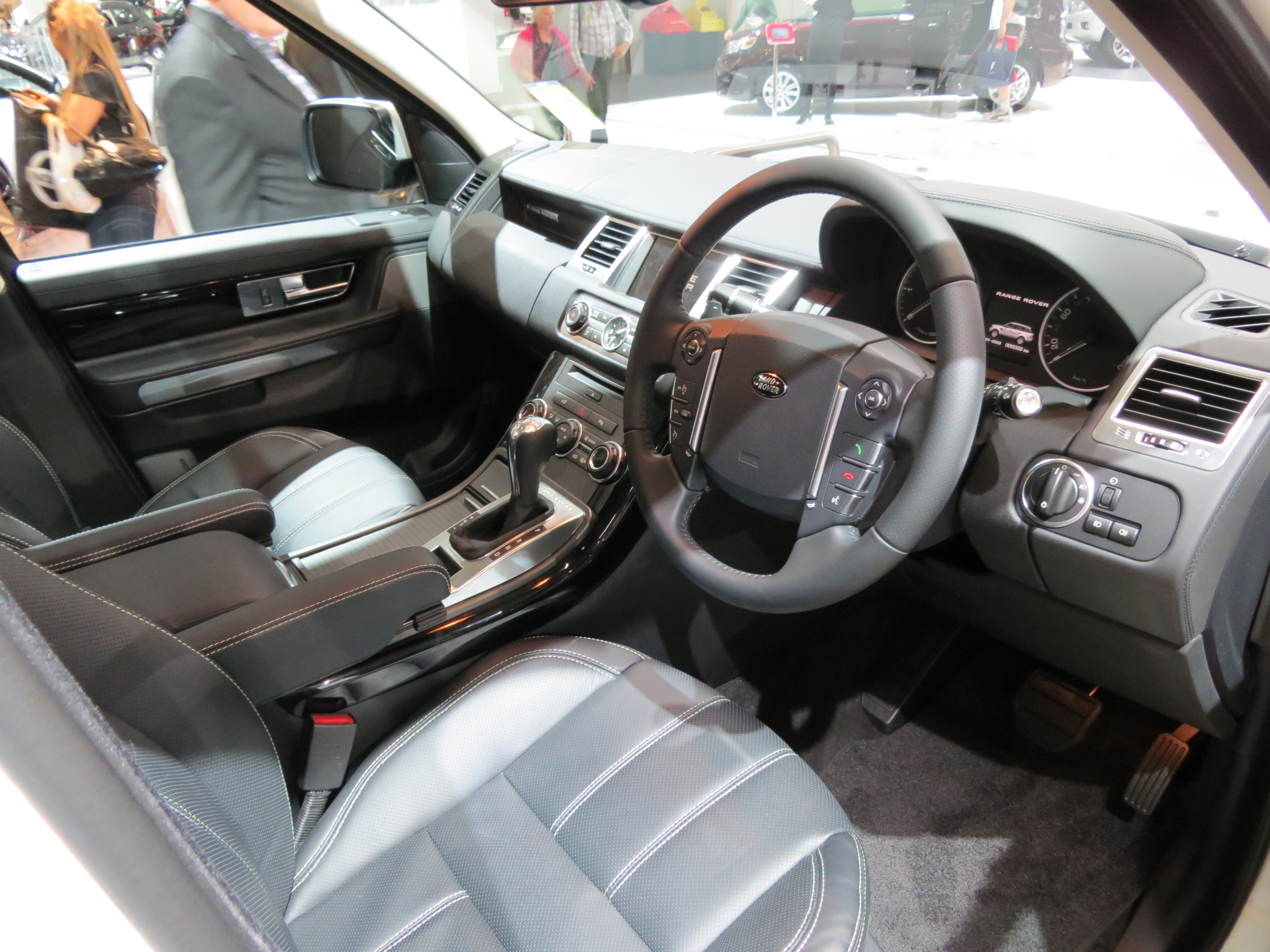
Facelift interior

A facelifted model was first shown at the New York Auto Show in April 2009. The 2010 Range Rover Sport featured a more aerodynamic front-end including new headlights, grille and bumper. Electric power folding mirrors were also added. Also new are revised rear lights and rear bumper. Interior revisions are more significant with a new fascia, steering wheel, door linings, seats, instruments and switchgear. The new model has more leather apparent and nearly 50 per cent fewer dash board buttons than the previous model. Three new engines made their debut in the 2010 Sport. These include an all-new direct injected, all-aluminium 5.0-litre petrol V8 engine in naturally aspirated and supercharged guises as seen in Jaguar's latest range of high-performance vehicles. The naturally aspirated model produces 375 hp (280 kW) and 375 lb⋅ft (508 N⋅m) torque while the supercharged produces 510 hp (380 kW) and 461 lb⋅ft (625 N⋅m) torque. Also new is a heavily revised 3.0-litre version of the current 2.7-litre TDV6 producing 180 kW (241 hp) and 600 N⋅m (443 lbf⋅ft), adapted from Jaguar's AJ-V6D Gen III. This engine features parallel sequential turbochargers – a single variable geometry turbocharger and a single fixed geometry turbocharger which is only active when required as seen on the Jaguar XF Diesel S. All of the new engines produce increased power and torque over their predecessors while delivering better fuel economy and reduced CO_{2} emissions. Fitted with a sixth generation twin-vortex supercharger with an improved thermodynamic efficiency of 16 per cent, the new 5.0-litre supercharged engine produces 29 per cent more power and 12 per cent more torque than the current 4.2-litre engine, yet CO_{2} emissions and fuel consumption are improved by 5.6 per cent and 6.2 per cent respectively. The new 3.0-litre TDV6 engine produces 29 per cent more power and 36 per cent more torque than the 2.7-litre engine, yet CO_{2} emissions and fuel consumption are both improved by 9 per cent. The 2010 model year Sport is also fitted with the new ZF HP28 six-speed automatic transmission. Designed to improve performance and efficiency, the new transmission engages the lock-up clutches of each gear earlier after selection. Suspension refinements also occurred with the introduction of the world's first production damping system using model-based predictive technology that continually optimise the settings of the new DampTronic Valve Technology damper units to optimise vehicle ride and control. Further improvements to the award-winning Terrain Response system have taken place for 2010. Revisions to the rock crawl program reduce roll when traversing boulders delivering a more composed ride over rocky terrain. The addition of a new 'sand launch control' prevents wheels digging in when driving away in soft sand thanks to revisions to the traction control system. The Hill Descent Control system has also been enhanced with the addition of Gradient Release Control, which inhibits the initial rate of acceleration when descending steep inclines.

=== Facelift (2012) ===
A final facelift to the L320 model came in MY12 introduced minor changes. The interior remained largely the same with features such as an electric one-piece power tailgate and revised media interface featuring Bluetooth audio streaming were added. There was also the addition of the ZF 8 speed automatic transmission and accompanying rotary wheel gear selector.

=== Trim ===
Throughout its production run, the first generation Range Rover Sport was available in a variety of trims.

- S (2006–2009): Sold only in Europe, the S was the cheapest Range Rover Sport available, this version came with cloth seating, a CD player, cruise control, sat nav, and the 2.7TD V6 diesel.
- SE (2006–2013): Sold only in Europe, the SE was a step up from the S, adding features such as heated seats, parking sensors and fog lights, it became the base trim after the S model was dropped.
- HSE (2006–2013): Serving as the base model for the North American market throughout its life, the HSE came standard with leather seating, dual zone automatic climate control, 19-inch wheels, 14-speaker, 600 watt sound system, and the 4.4-litre naturally aspirated V8 (later replaced by the 5.0-litre V8 for the facelift models). In the UK, this version was also offered with the diesel V6 or V8. It was later offered with a Luxury package, which included much of the optional equipment as standard
- Supercharged (2006–2013): The performance model, the Supercharged added the supercharged V8 engine for improved performance, as well as other luxury features.
- HST (2006–2009): Exclusive to Europe, the HST added a sportier body kit with new bumpers and grille designs, and came with much of the optional equipment fitted as standard. It was only available with either the supercharged petrol V8 or diesel V8.
- Autobiography (2011–2013): Serving as the top trim, the Autobiography included adaptive automatic headlights, new wheels, a 360-degree camera system and more luxurious upholstery for the ultimate Range Rover Sport.
- HST Limited Edition (2009): Exclusive to North America, the HST Limited Edition was a limited production version of the European HST. Sold only with the supercharged V8 engine, it included the same body kit as the regular HST, plus unique wheels and upholstery.
- GT Limited Edition (2011–2013): Sold only in North America, the GT Limited Edition was a limited production version of the HSE which incorporated luxury features from the Autobiography as standard equipment.

=== Controversy ===
The Range Rover Sport made Ford's Premier Automotive Group the target of a protest by Greenpeace in 2005. The protesters infiltrated an assembly facility and temporarily delayed production of the vehicle. Greenpeace cited issues with greenhouse gas emissions and, by extension, global warming. The United States Environmental Protection Agency estimates for the non-supercharged car are 14 mpg_{‑US} (17 L/100 km; 17 mpg_{‑imp}) (combined). Although, for this test, the EPA used their newly calibrated system for 2008 and on. Greenpeace stated that they did not take issue with the production of vehicles such as the Land Rover Defender, as they are typically used for off-road applications on a much more frequent basis than vehicles such as the Range Rover Sport, which they claim "has been tuned primarily for on road performance".

== Second generation (L494; 2013) ==
Second generation
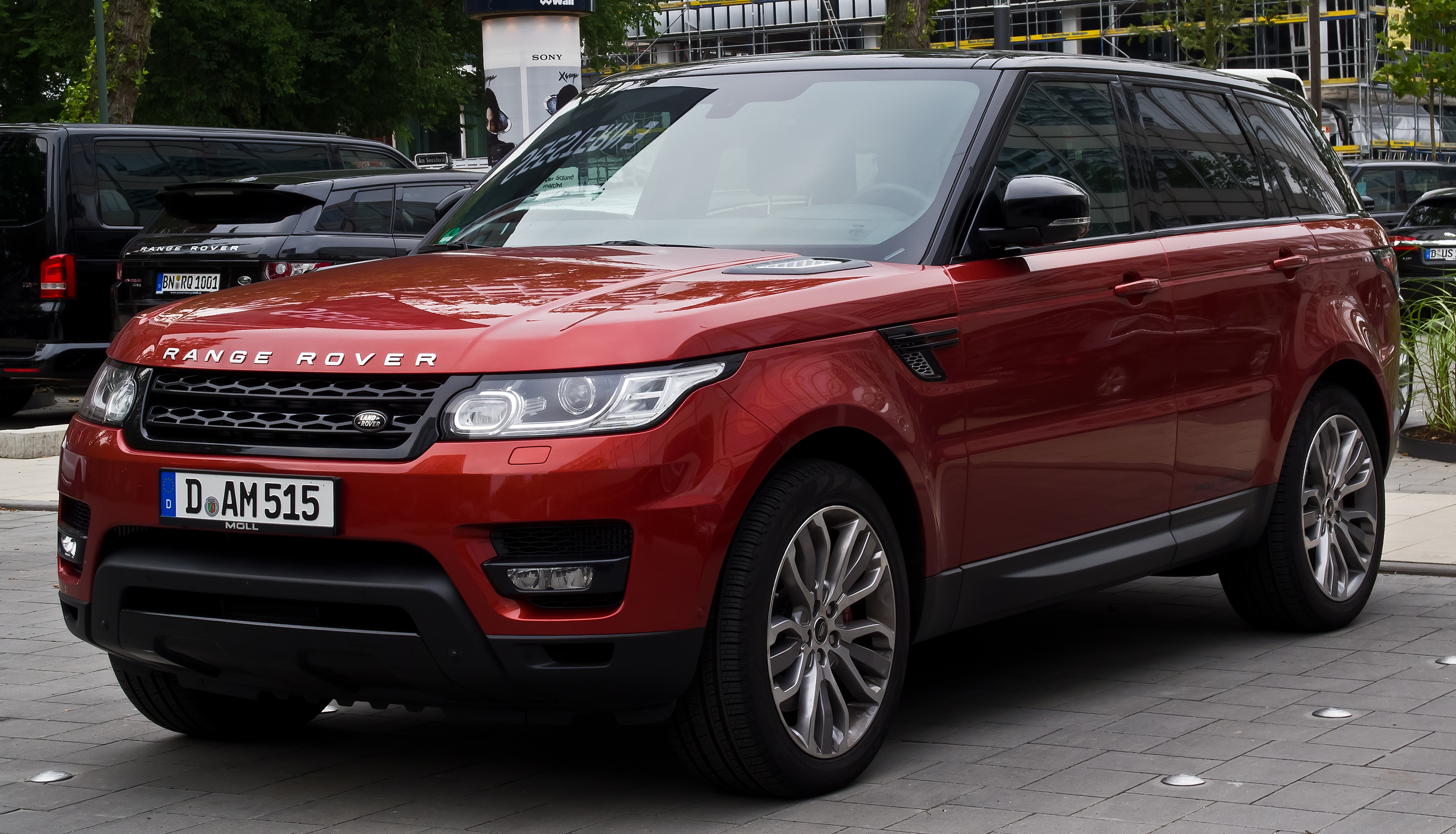

Overview
- Model code: L494
- Production: 2013–2022
- Assembly: United Kingdom: Solihull (Solihull plant)
- Designer: Gerry McGovern

Body and chassis
- Platform: JLR D7u
- Related: Range Rover (L405); Land Rover Discovery (L462)

Powertrain
- Engine: Petrol: 2.0 L Ingenium I4 Plug-In Hybrid 404ps (398 hp); 3.0 L Jaguar AJ-V6 V6 Supercharged 340ps (335 hp); 3.0 L Ingenium AJ300 I6 MHEV 360ps (355 hp) & 400ps (394 hp); 5.0 L AJ-V8 SC V8 with either 510ps (503 hp), 525ps (518 hp), 550ps (542 hp) or 575ps (567 hp); Diesel: 2.0 L Ingenium twin-turbo I4, 237 hp (LR-SD4); 3.0 L AJD turbo V6, 258 hp (LR-TDV6), 306 hp (LR-SDV6), and 340 hp (LR-SDV6 hybrid); 4.4 L Ford 4.4 TD turbo V8 (LR-SDV8)
- Electric motor: 48V mild-hybrid (Synchronous Reluctance Motor); 105 kW Permanent Magnet Synchronous Motor (PHEV)
- Transmission: 8-speed automatic (ZF 8HP)
- Battery: 13.1 kWh Lithium ion (PHEV)

Dimensions
- Wheelbase: 115.1 in (2,923.5 mm)
- Length: 191 in (4,851.4 mm)
- Width: 81.6 in (2,072.6 mm) (mirrors folded)
- Height: 71.3 in (1,811.0 mm)
- Kerb weight: 4,727 lb (2,144.1 kg)

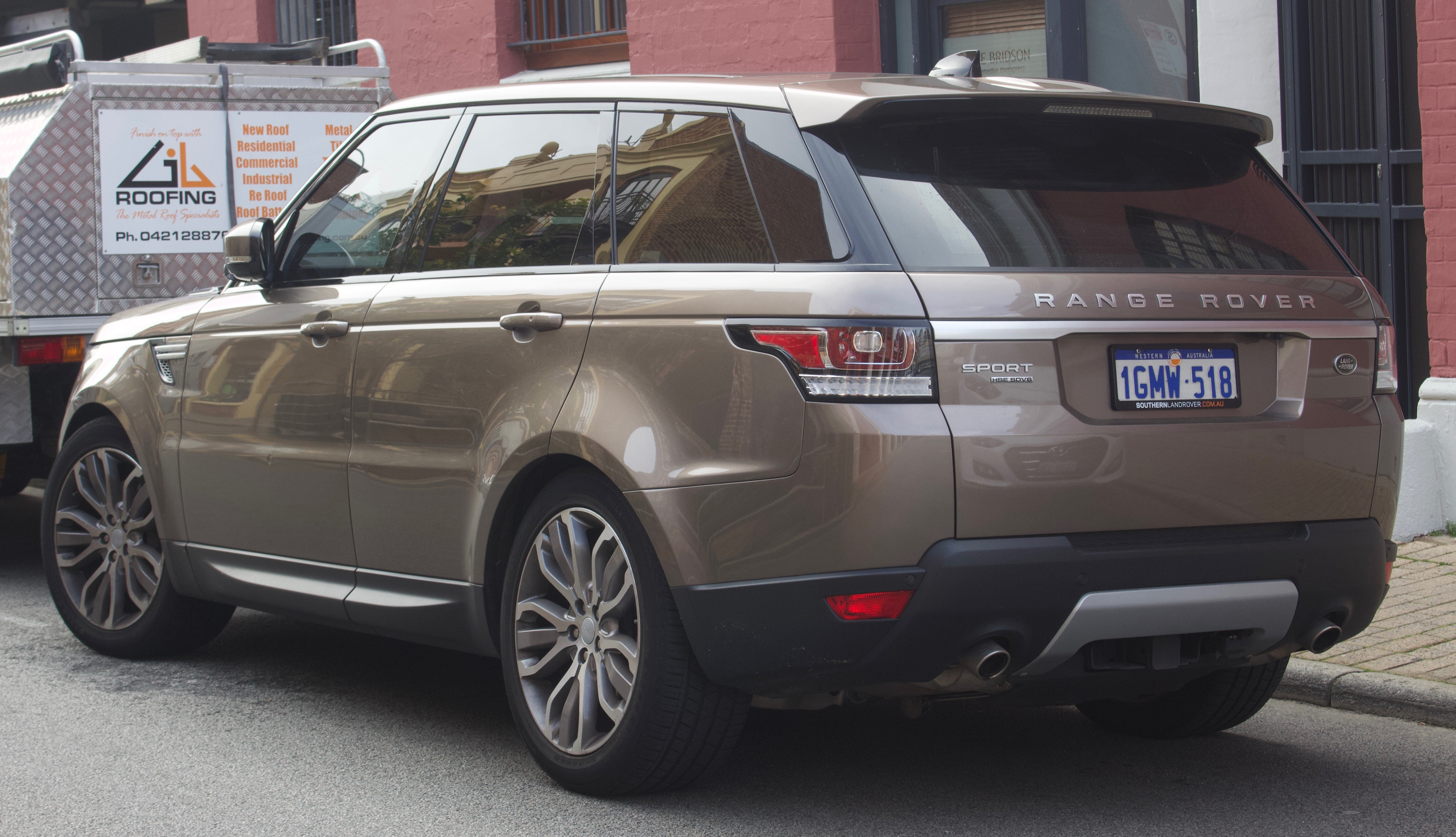
Range Rover Sport SDV6 HSE

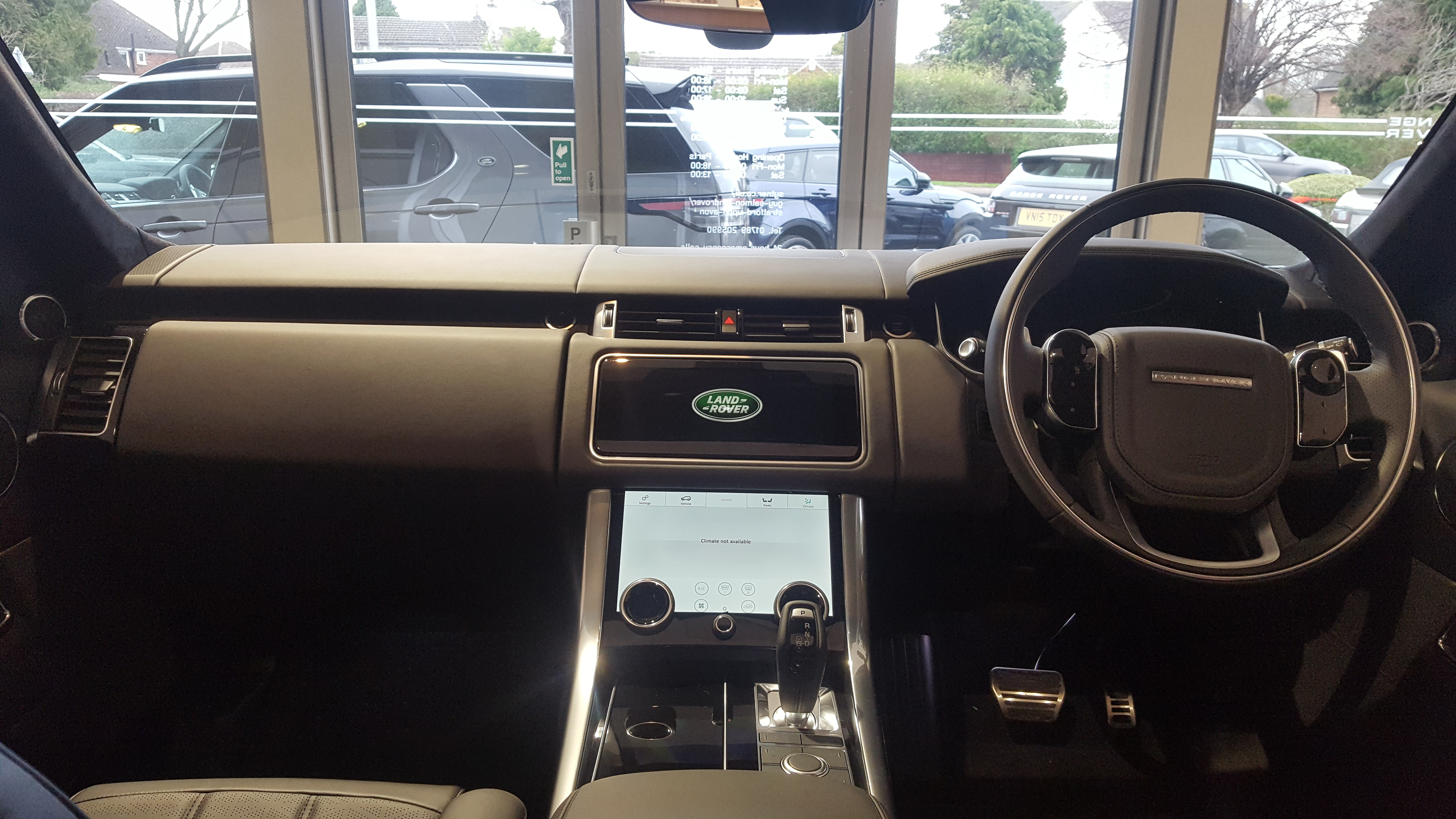
Interior

The second-generation Range Rover Sport was announced on 27 March 2013 at the New York Auto Show. Several streets were shut down in Manhattan for a launch party starring James Bond actor Daniel Craig.

=== Design ===
The new Range Rover Sport continues in the design direction that produced the Evoque styling, and the full-size 2013 Range Rover. It is 4 inches (100 mm) longer, being 191 inches (4,851 mm) long; and 400 lb (181 kg) lighter, weighing in at 4,727 lb (2,144 kg). Unlike the previous generation that uses an integrated bodyframe chassis, the L494 Range Rover Sport utilises an all-aluminium monocoque body, just like the L405 Range Rover.

It introduced Dynamic Response suspension with active anti-roll bars.

=== Facelift (2018–2022) ===
In 2017, at the Los Angeles Car Show, the Jaguar Land Rover Group announced the facelifted Range Rover Sport would begin production in 2018. The new Sport features new headlights, a new interior with the touch duo system and a MHEV 355 and 395 HP as well as a V8 with 518 HP and the SVR version with 575 HP. The main changes in the facelift are redesigned front and rear bumpers, new exhausts (two black pipes on S & SE variants, twin silver pipes on HSE, HSE Dynamic and Autobiography with Dynamic Pack and Quad exhausts on the SVR Variant) and upgraded touch duo infotainment from the 2018 Range Rover Velar.

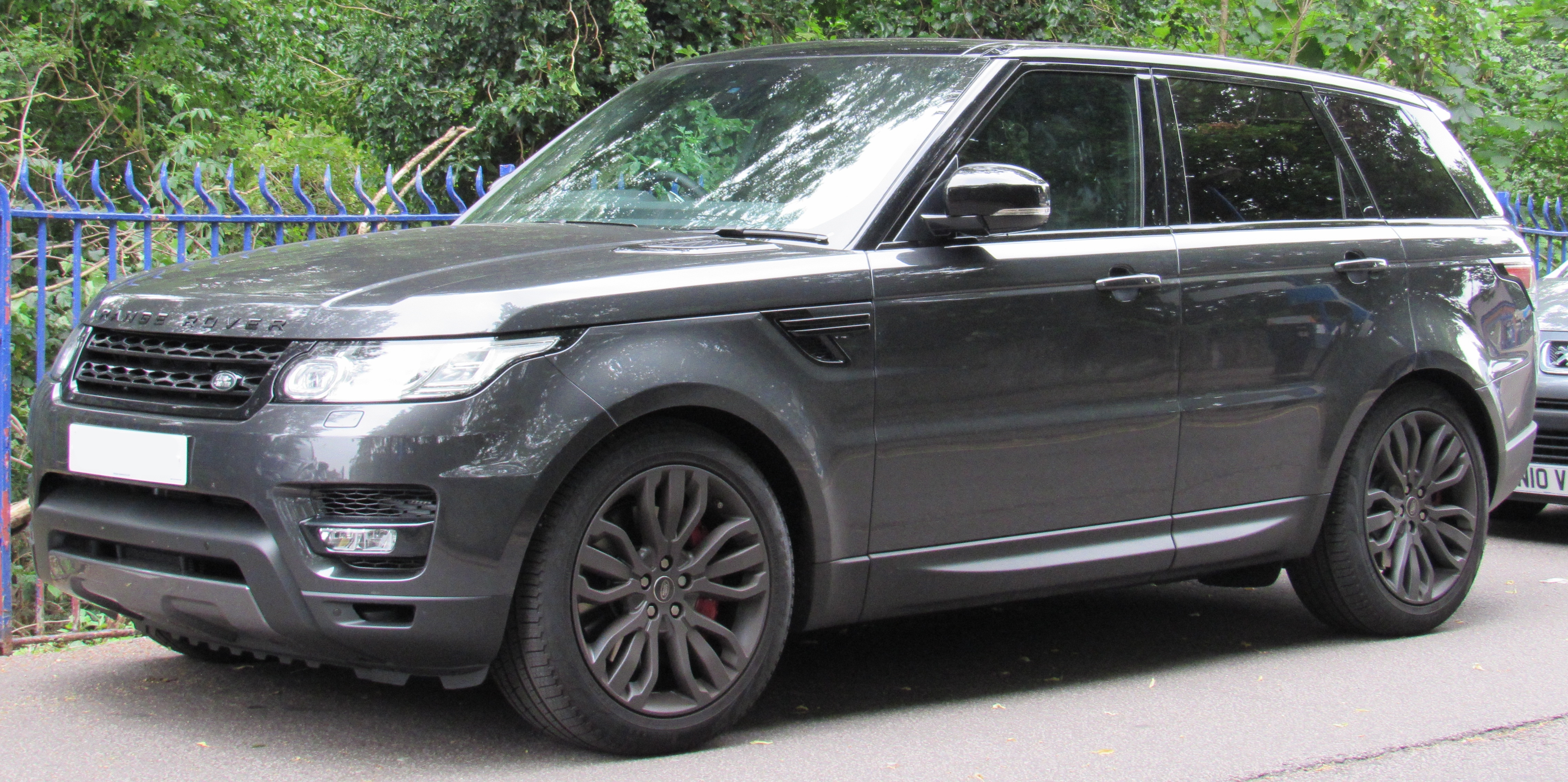
2017 facelift

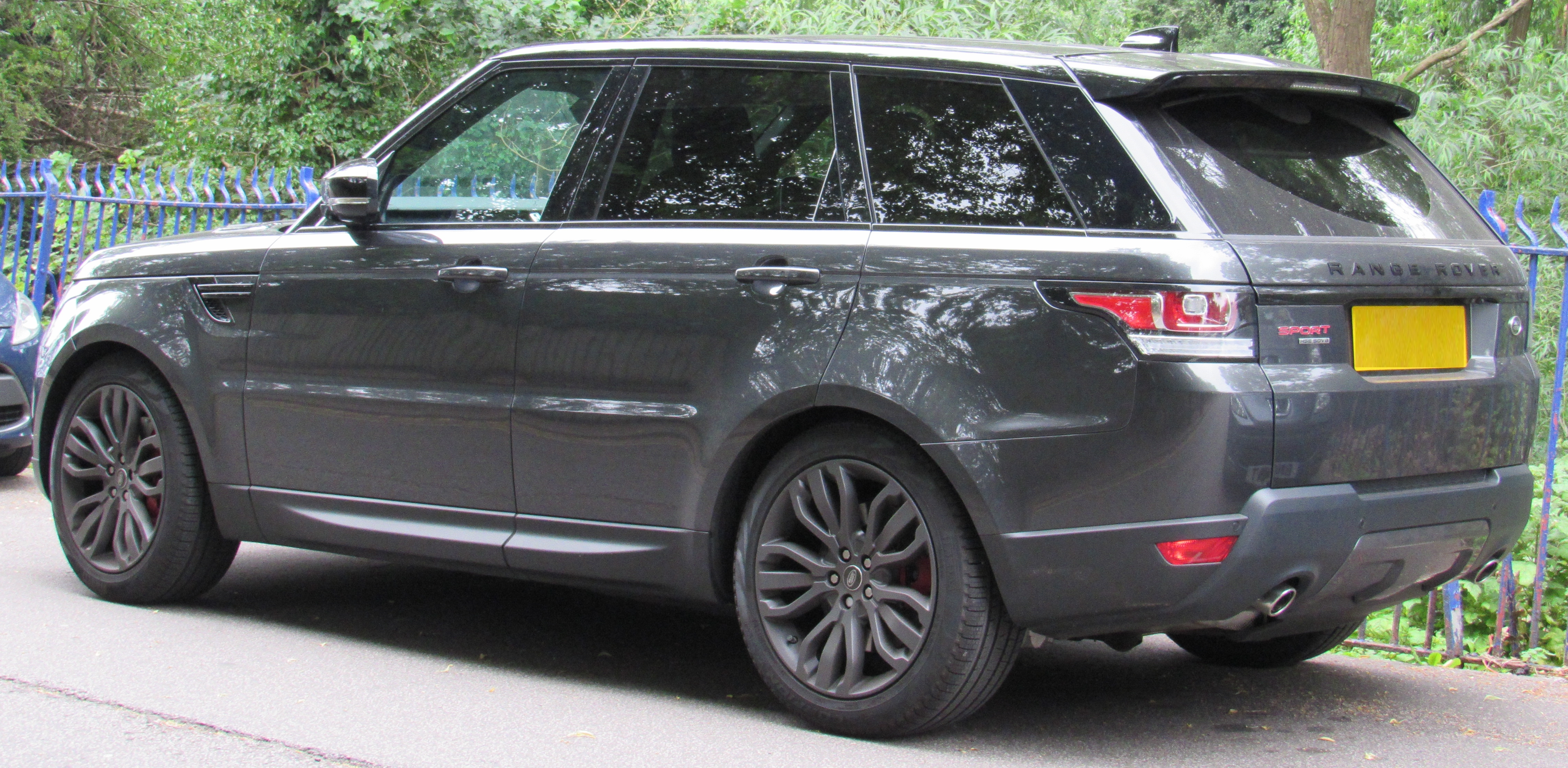
2017 facelift

=== Special models ===
==== SVR (2015–2018; pre-facelift) ====
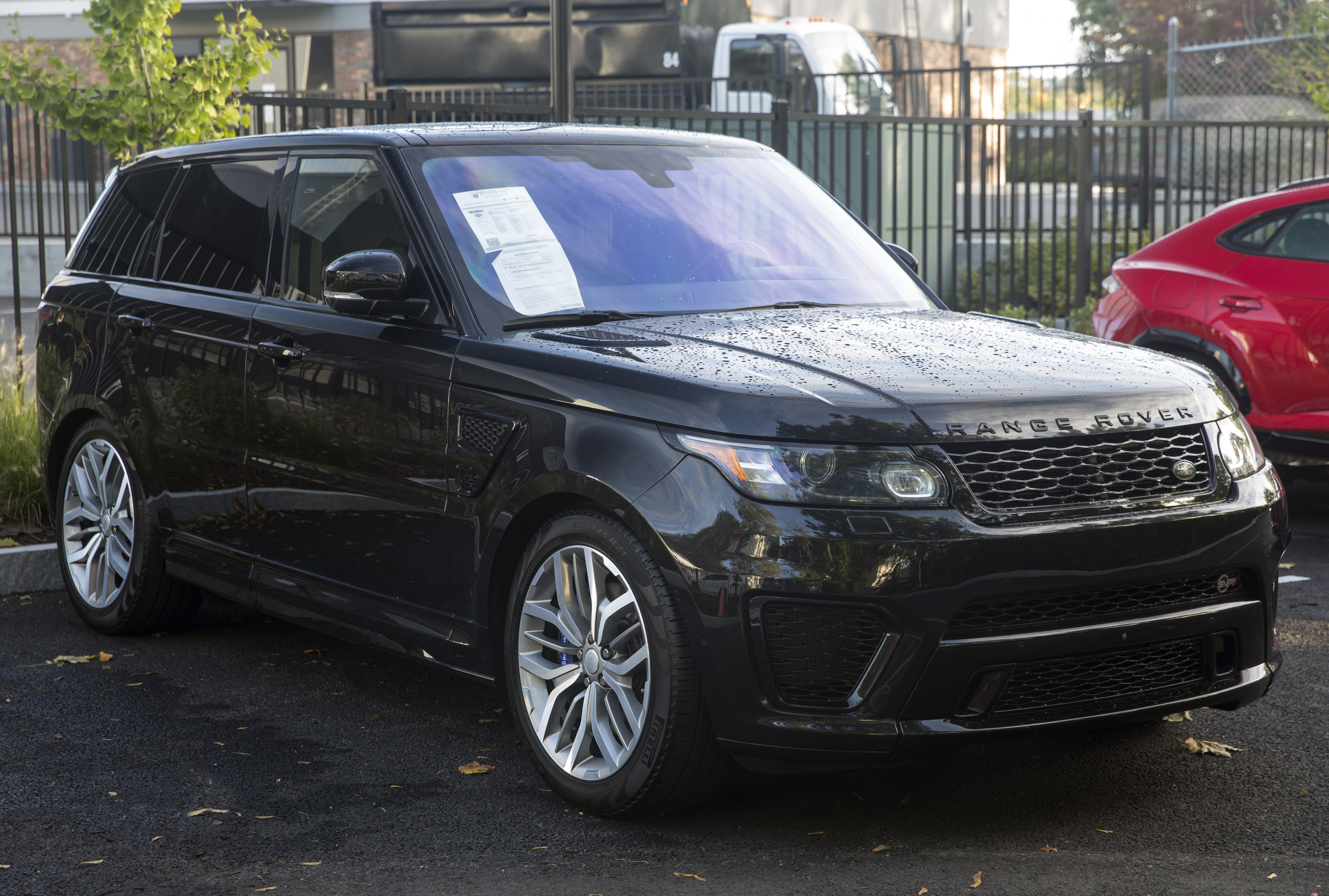
Range Rover Sport SVR

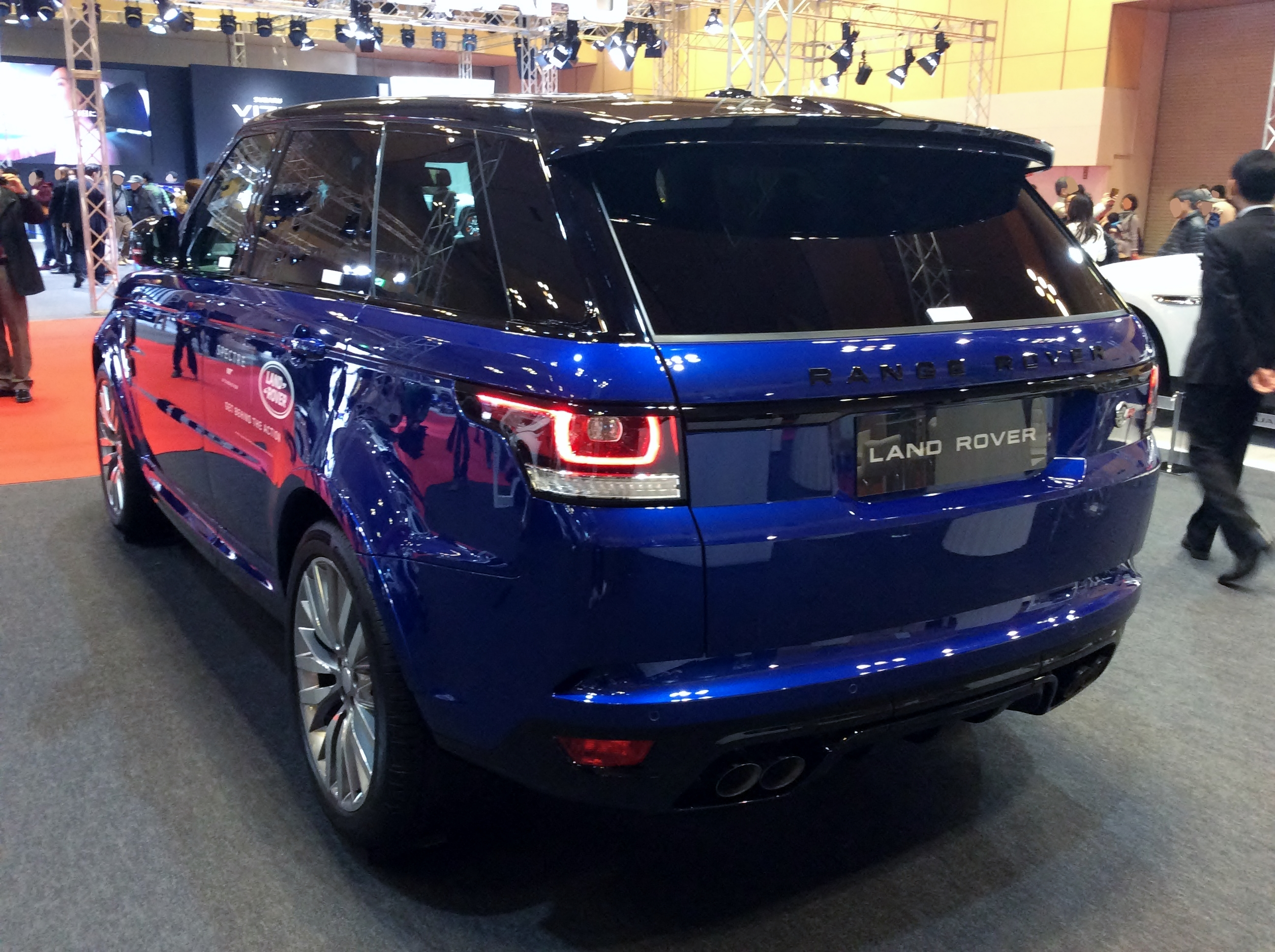
Range Rover Sport SVR

On 11 August 2014, the Range Rover SVR (Special Vehicle Racing) was announced by Land Rover at Pebble Beach. The model sports a number of aesthetic alterations and performance improvements.

The design of the model features a fully revised front bumper, with larger ducts and the main grille finished in black. The front quarter ducts are also revised and completed in a black finish. The rear bumper is also completely revised with a new, more pronounced diffuser and twin-circle exhaust tips. The SVR comes with 21 inch alloy wheels, wrapped in 275/45 R21 all-season tyres as standard.

Performance upgrades for the SVR including the 5.0L supercharged V8 shared with the Jaguar F-Type, with a power output of 550 hp (410 kW) and torque output of 502 lb⋅ft (681 N⋅m) the transmission has been programmed to shift 50% quicker and to keep the torque converter locked up once it is in second gear. The chassis had also been revised for the model. Debut of Adaptive Dynamics with Magnetorheological dampers. New for the SVR is the addition of an Active exhaust system with electronically controlled valves. The improvements make the SVR capable of 0-60 mph (97 km/h) in 4.5 seconds and a top speed of 162 mph (261 km/h), one of the quickest of its type.

==== HST Limited Edition (2016) ====
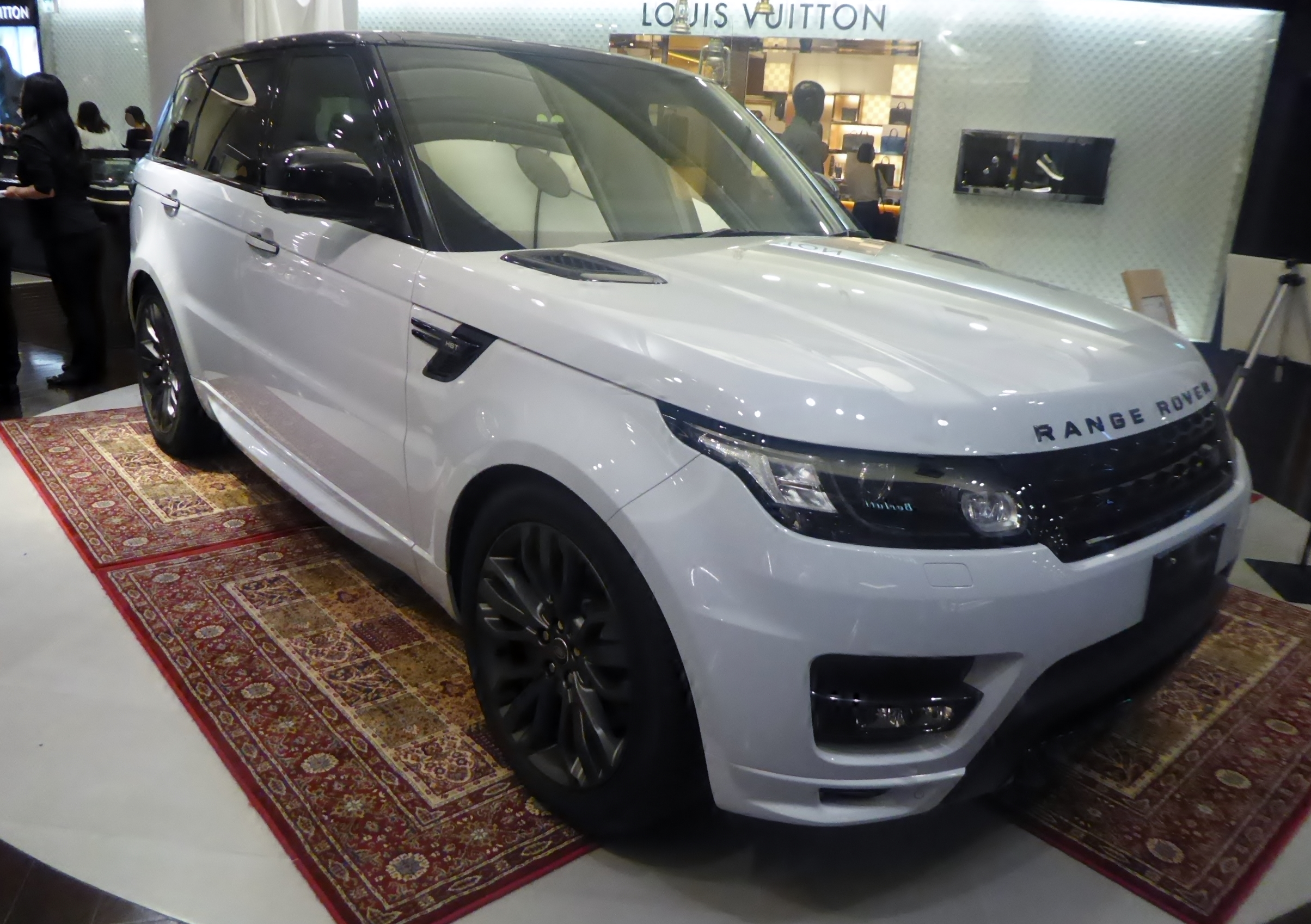
Range Rover Sport HST Limited Edition in Fuji White

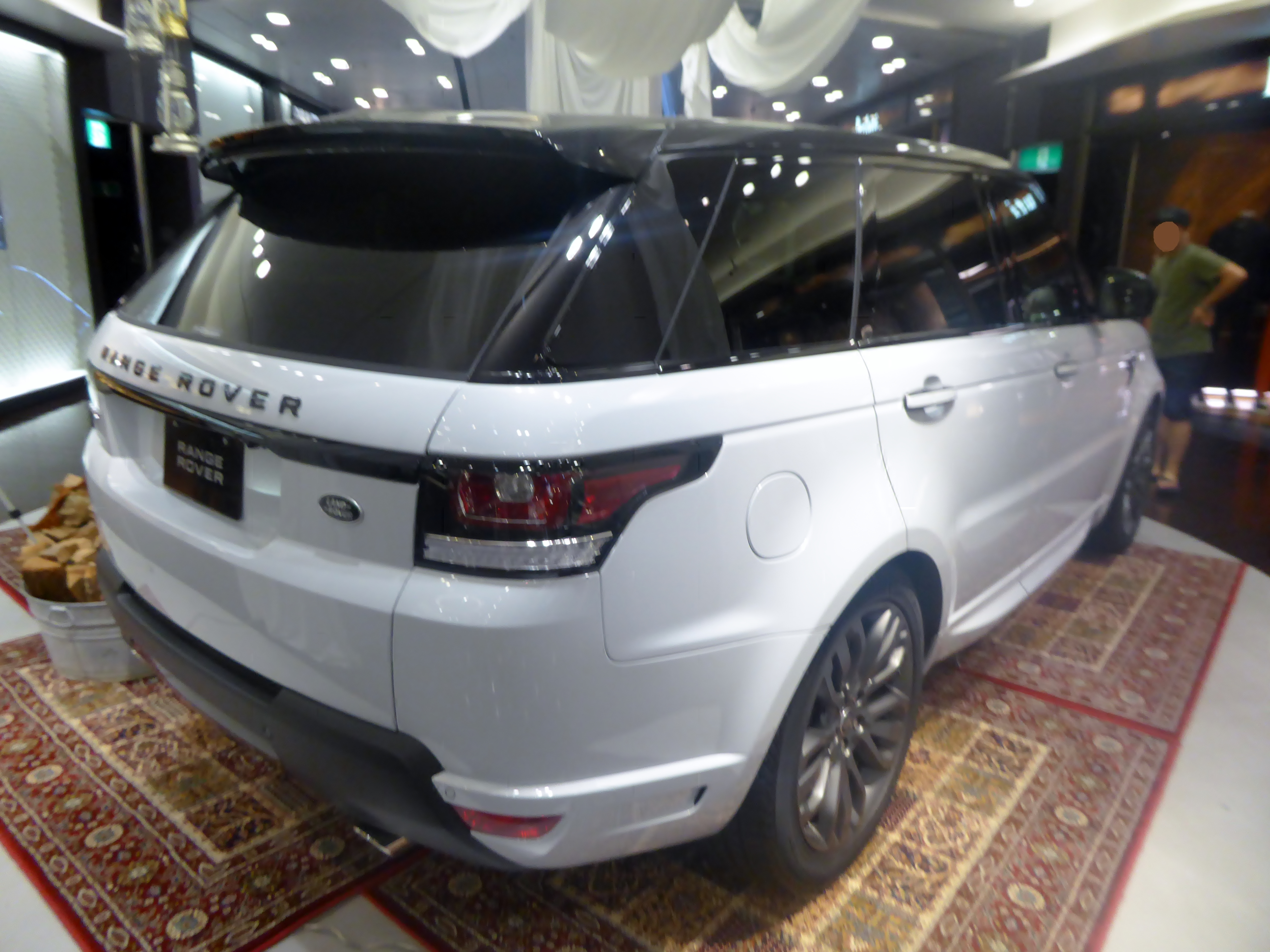

Officially unveiled at the 2015 New York International Auto Show, the HST Limited Edition returned to the North American Range Rover Sport lineup after a 7-year hiatus and, similar to the previous iterations, put emphasis on driving dynamics and sportiness. Designed to bridge the gap between the V6 powered HSE and the Supercharged models, the HST Limited Edition featured a tuned version of the HSE's 3.0 L Jaguar AJ supercharged V6 with 380 bhp, 40 more than standard. It also included many other features to allow for a more road focused and dynamic Range Rover Sport, including unique 21-inch wheels, upgraded brakes and suspension, chassis enhancements, and a reprogrammed AWD system. To cosmetically distinguish it from other models, the HST Limited Edition featured darkened headlight and taillight bezels, a black painted roof and bonnet vents, red "Sport" badges, red brake calipers, Oxford leather interior, and a unique front and rear fascia. It was offered in four metallic colours, Indus Silver, Santorini Black, Corris Grey and Firenze Red, as well as the non metallic Fuji White.

Only offered in limited production for the 2016 model year, the HST Limited Edition would be discontinued for 2017 and effectively replaced by the HSE Dynamic, which featured many of the same mechanical changes as the HST. The HSE Dynamic was sold until partway through 2019, when Land Rover replaced it with a new non-limited HST, this time powered by the new Ingenium AJ300 inline-6 hybrid engine.

==== SVR (2018–2022; facelift) ====
In 2017 at the LA Auto Show, the facelifted Range Rover Sport SVR was announced by the Jaguar Land Rover Group. This facelifted model includes all of the same features that the 2018 Range Rover Sport has, but the SVR has upgraded body styling which includes the new Silver Quad Exhausts and the new option of a Carbon Fibre bonnet. The 2018 SVR still includes the same 5.0L Supercharged V8 from the Jaguar F-Type, but the engine now produces 575 hp (429 kW) instead of the pre-facelift's 550 hp (410 kW), allowing the SVR to accelerate from 0-60 mph (97 km/h) in 4 seconds.

Due to its large size and poor environmental record, Environmental Action Germany nominated the Range Rover Sport SVR for their Goldener Geier (Golden Vulture) 2020 award.

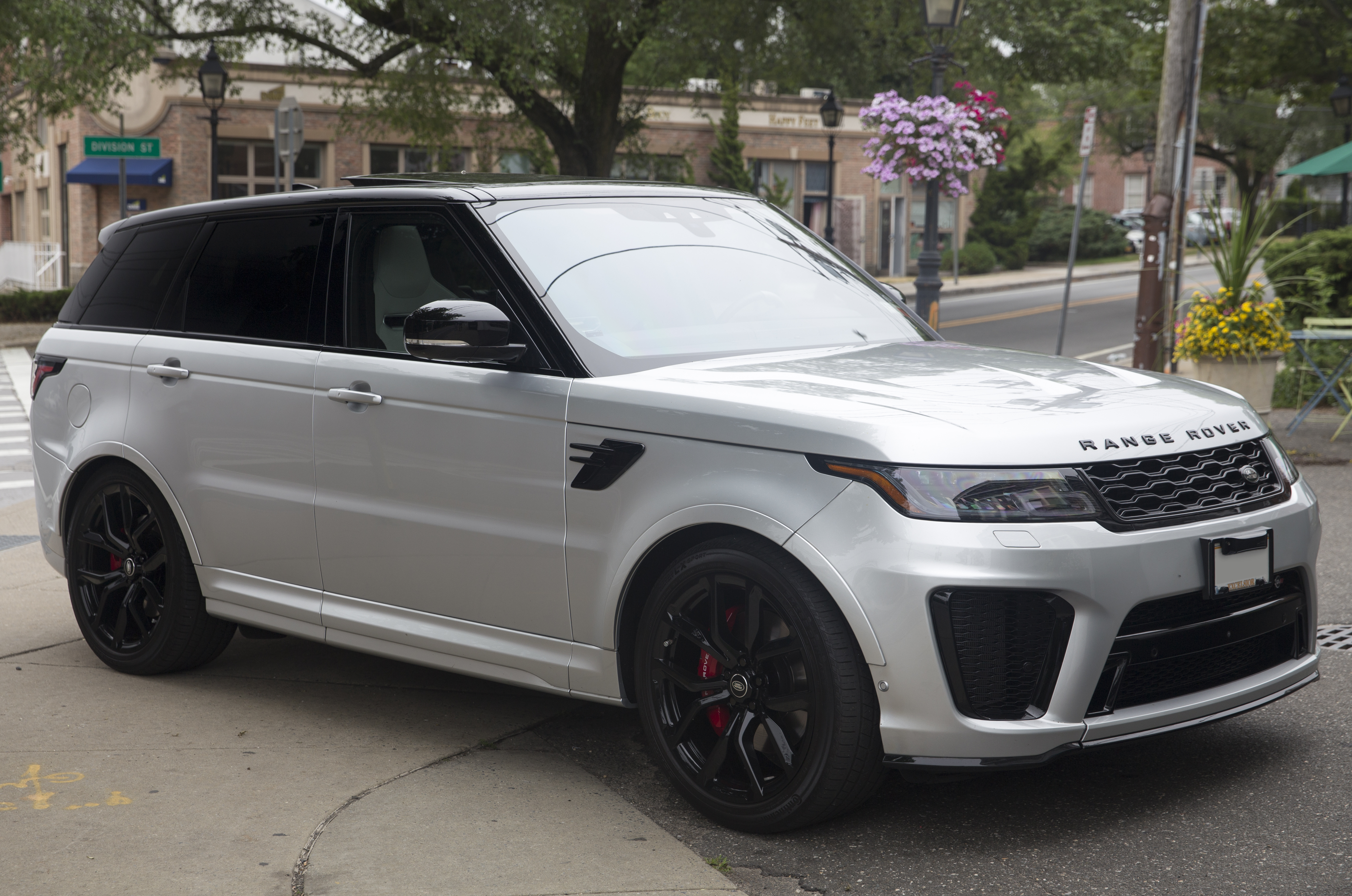
2020 Range Rover Sport SVR (US)

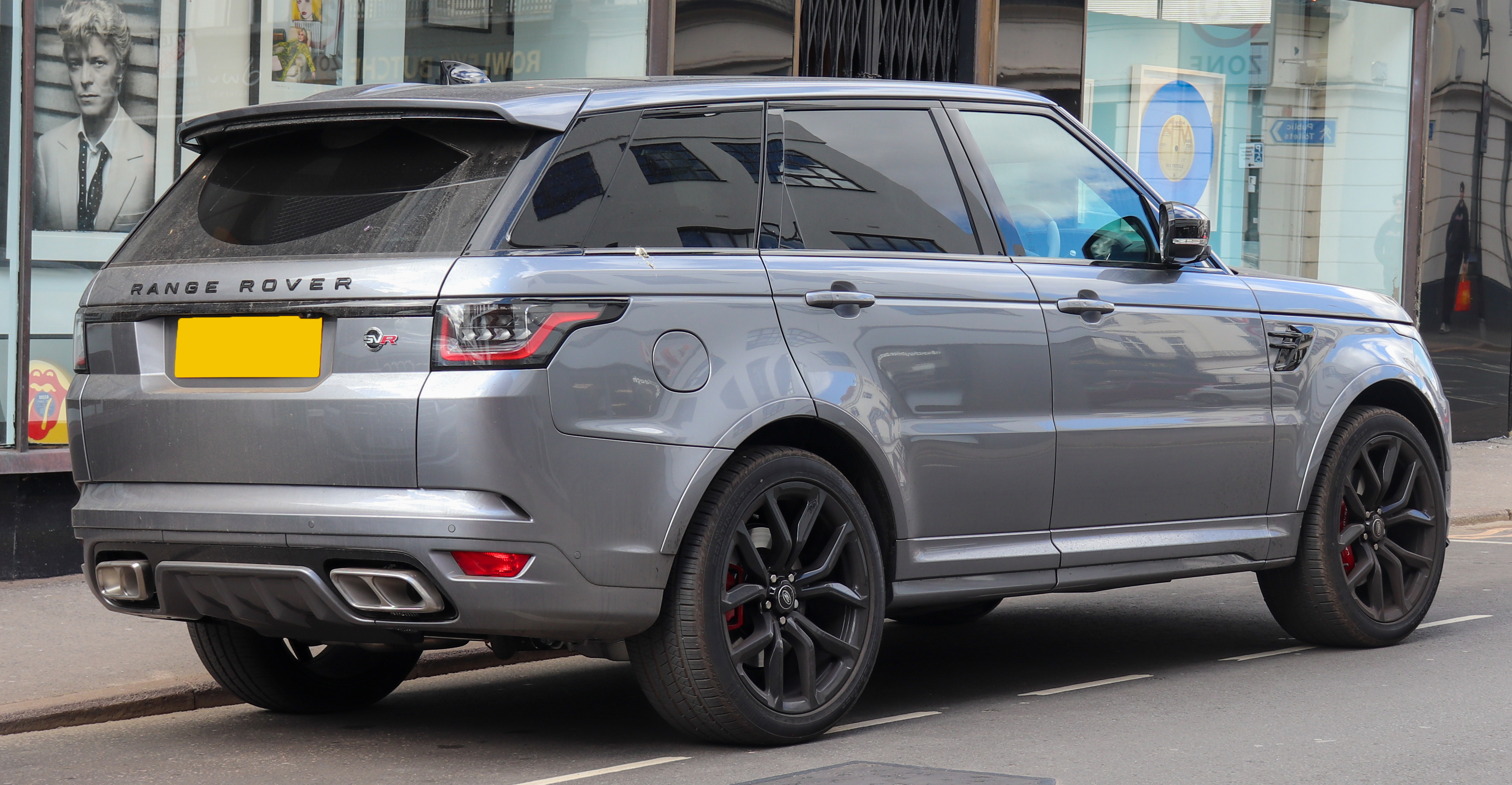
2021 Range Rover Sport SVR (UK; rear view)

=== Dragon Challenge ===
In February 2018, Land Rover brought a Range Rover Sport hybrid to Tianmen Mountain, where driver Ho-Pin Tung successfully climbed the 45-degree angle staircase of 999 steps to Heaven's Gate.

== Third generation (L461; 2022) ==
Third generation
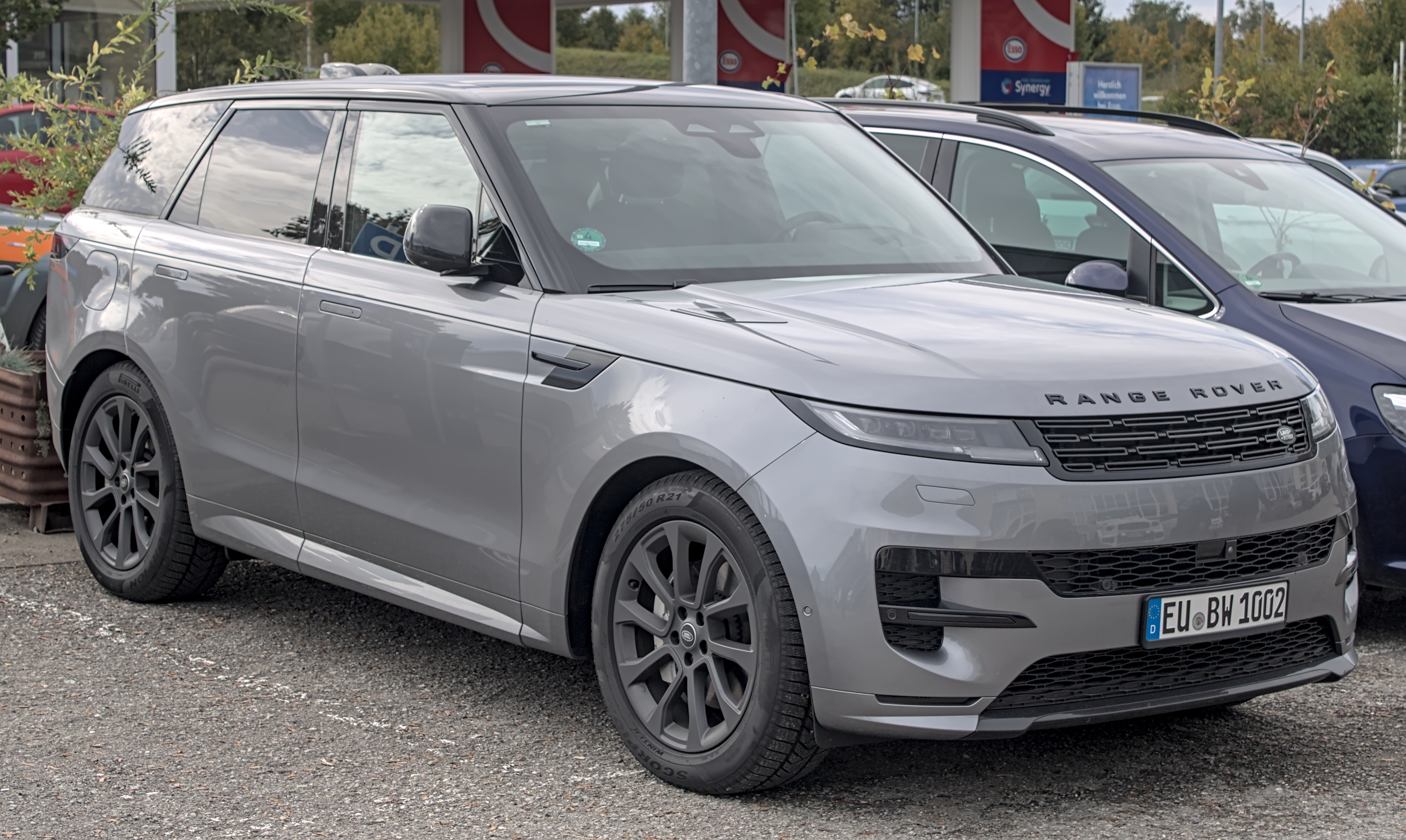

Overview
- Model code: L461
- Production: 2022–present
- Assembly: United Kingdom: Solihull (Solihull plant); India: Pune (JLR India)

Body and chassis
- Platform: MLA-Flex
- Related: Range Rover (L460)

Powertrain
- Engine: Petrol: 3.0 L AJ300 turbo I6 MHEV; 4.4 L BMW N63 twin-turbo V8; 4.4 L S63 twin-turbo V8 (SV); Petrol plug-in hybrid: 3.0 L turbo I6 PHEV; Diesel: 3.0 L AJ300D twin-turbo I6 MHEV
- Electric motor: 105 kW (143 PS; 141 hp) Permanent Magnet Synchronous Motor (PHEV)
- Transmission: 8-speed ZF 8HP automatic
- Hybrid drivetrain: Mild hybrid; Plug-in hybrid
- Battery: 38.2 (31.8 usable) kWh Lithium ion (P440e/510e PHEV)

Dimensions
- Wheelbase: 2,997 mm (118.0 in)
- Length: 4,946 mm (194.7 in)
- Width: 2,047 mm (80.6 in)
- Height: 1,820 mm (71.7 in)
- Kerb weight: 5,119 lb (2,322 kg)

The 2023 Range Rover Sport was revealed on 11 May 2022. The chopped-roof sibling of the regular Range Rover gains minimalist styling inside and out with powertrain options ranging from MHEV, PHEV and eventually a twin-turbo V8. An all-electric variant known as the Range Rover Sport Electric was unveiled on 30 September 2026.

=== Structure ===
As the previous generation, the L461 continues in the way of the L460, featuring design cues, similar powertrain and shared parts. Based on the MLA-Flex platform, it is significantly heavier than its predecessor, at 2,322 kg (5,119 lb), it is now approximately 180 kg (400 lb) heavier. Based on the same unibody structure as the L460, it has one conventional petrol model, four petrol plug-in hybrid models, four petrol mild hybrid models, and three diesel mild hybrid models. At 20 mm lower and 35 per cent stiffer than the Range Rover, it remains as a standard all-wheel drive off-road crossover vehicle.

=== Interior ===
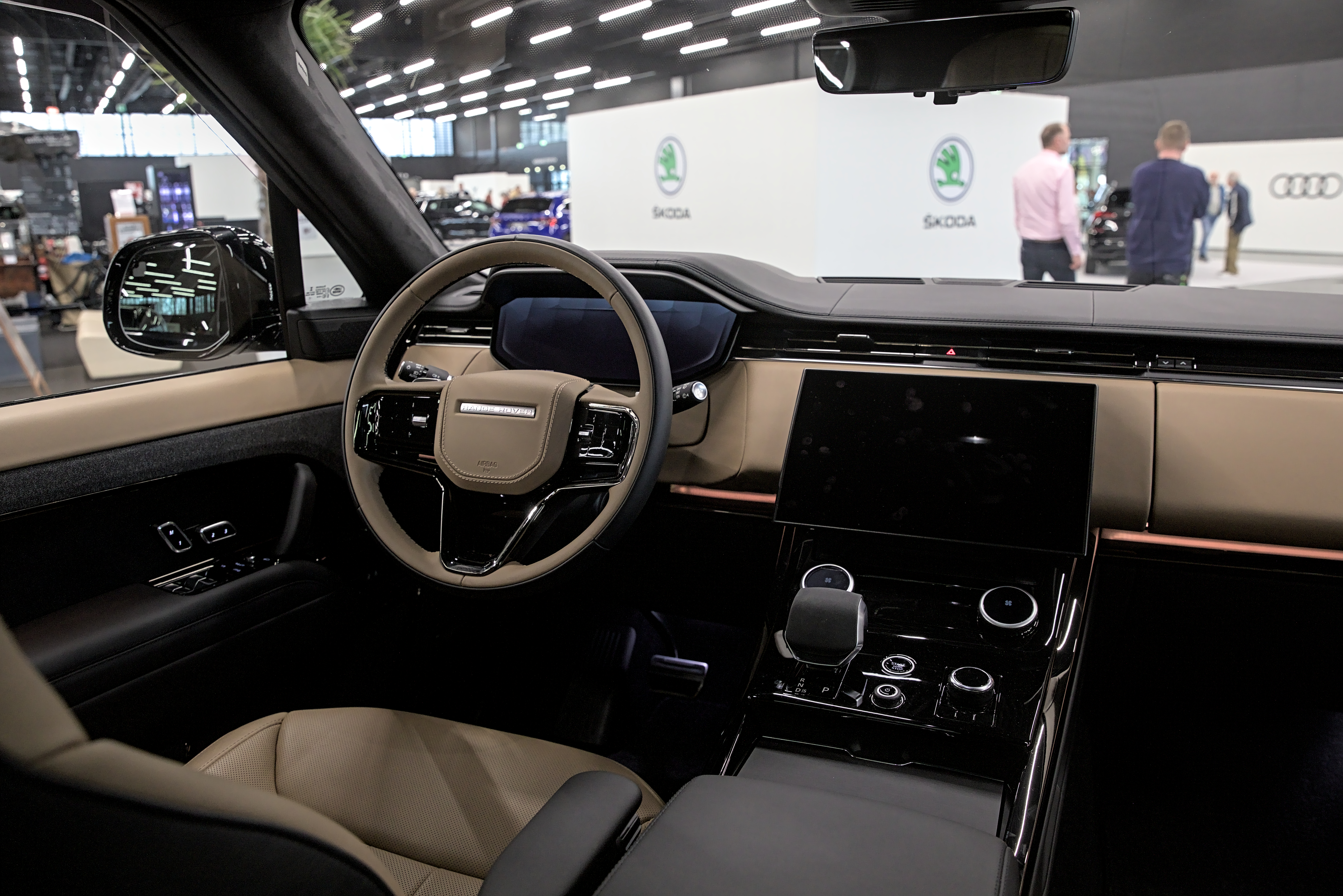
Interior

According to the brand, the P440e and P510e has 70 miles (110 km) of all-electric range. The Sport includes a high-resolution 7-inch digital driver instrument cluster display that comes standard on all models. The latest iteration of the ‘Pivi Pro’ system, essentially a slightly curved 13.1-inch infotainment touchscreen, which is also on the larger model, will be included.

Wireless Apple CarPlay and Android Auto will be available. There is 450 L of boot space (835 L, if measured to the roof, expanding to 1850 L with seats folded.

=== Specifications ===
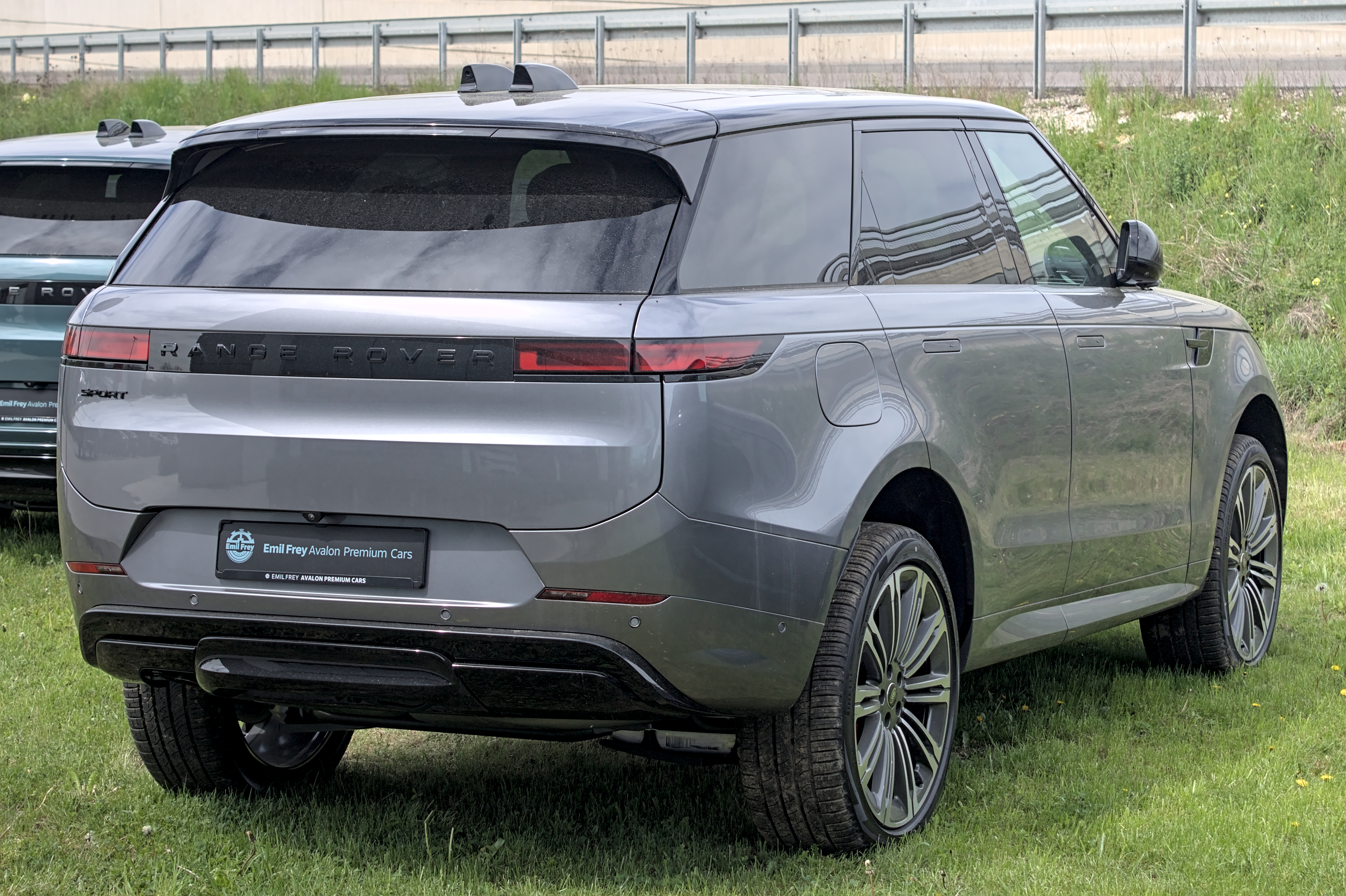
Rear view

With a wheelbase of 2,997 mm (118.0 in), a length of 4,946 mm (194.7 in), a width of 2,047 mm (80.6 in), and a height of 1,820 mm (71.7 in), it is just slightly smaller than the previous generation of the Range Rover, except width, where the Sport is wider.

=== Range Rover Sport Electric ===
The Range Rover Sport Electric is the battery electric variant of the L461. Similar to the Range Rover Electric (L460), it rides on an updated version of the MLA Flex platform with an 800-volt electrical architecture. Compared to the plug-in hybrid variants, its body is 61% stiffer and its center of gravity is 73 mm (2.9 in) lower. Furthermore, its air suspension has been retuned with electronic active roll control and twin-valve dampers. It also features minor cosmetic changes, such as a smoothed out front grille, exclusive wheel designs, and "EV" badging.

At launch, only one powertrain available – the EV550 shared with the L460. It uses a 118.5 kWh lithium-ion battery and dual motors, producing 550 PS (540 hp; 400 kW) and 850 N⋅m (630 lb⋅ft) of torque, accelerating from 0-60 mph (97 km/h) in 4.3 seconds. Its WLTP range reaches up to 373 mi (600 km). It can charge at up to 350 kW using a DC fast charger, charging from 10%-80% in 22 minutes.

=== Powertrain ===
Unlike previous generations, this model no longer uses permanent all-wheel drive. This new part-time system features Land Rover's new Active Driveline. A controlled multi-disc clutch in the transfer case and decoupler in the front differential switch the vehicle to rear wheel drive at speeds between 21 and 100 mph. With similar specifications to the larger model, the PHEV models run on a 38.2 kWh (138 MJ) lithium-ion battery, with 31.8 kWh (114 MJ) usable. Four PHEV models are available.

Internal combustion engines
Spec Model	Engine	Power	Torque	Displacement	Top speed	Transmission	Acceleration (0-60/100)	Propulsion type	Drive	Production
Petrol models
P360	3.0 L AJ300 turbo I6	360 PS (265 kW; 355 hp) @ 5500-6500	500 N⋅m (369 lb⋅ft) @ 1750-5000	2,996 cc (3.0 L; 182.8 cu in)	225 km/h (140 mph)	ZF 8-speed automatic transmission	6.0 sec	Mild hybrid	AWD	2022–
P400	3.0 L AJ300 turbo I6	400 PS (294 kW; 395 hp) @ 5500-6500	550 N⋅m (406 lb⋅ft) @ 2000-5000	2,995 cc (3.0 L; 182.8 cu in)	242 km/h (150 mph)	ZF 8-speed automatic transmission	5.7 sec	Mild hybrid	AWD	2022–
P530	4.4 L twin-turbo V8	530 PS (390 kW; 523 hp) @ 5500-6000	750 N⋅m (553 lb⋅ft) @ 1800-4600	4,395 cc (4.4 L; 268.2 cu in)	250 km/h (155 mph)	ZF 8-speed automatic transmission	4.5 sec	Petrol	AWD	2022–
SV	4.4 L twin-turbo V8	635 PS (467 kW; 626 hp) @ 6000-7000rpm	750 N⋅m (553 lb⋅ft) @ 1800-5800rpm	4,395 cc (4.4 L; 268.2 cu in)	290 km/h (180 mph)	ZF 8-speed automatic transmission	3.6 sec	Petrol	AWD	2023–
Diesel models
D250	3.0 L AJ300D twin-turbo I6	250 PS (184 kW; 247 hp) @ 4000	600 N⋅m (443 lb⋅ft) @ 1250–2250	2,997 cc (3.0 L; 182.9 cu in)	206 km/h (128 mph)	ZF 8-speed automatic transmission	8.0 sec	Mild hybrid	AWD	2022–
D300	3.0 L AJ300D twin-turbo I6	300 PS (221 kW; 296 hp) @ 4000	650 N⋅m (479 lb⋅ft) @ 1250–2250	2,993 cc (3.0 L; 182.6 cu in)	218 km/h (135 mph)	ZF 8-speed automatic transmission	6.6 sec	Mild hybrid	AWD	2022–
D350	3.0 L AJ300D twin-turbo I6	350 PS (257 kW; 345 hp) @ 4000	700 N⋅m (516 lb⋅ft) @ 1500-3000	2,997 cc (3.0 L; 182.9 cu in)	234 km/h (145 mph)	ZF 8-speed automatic transmission	5.9 sec	Mild hybrid	AWD	2022–
Plug-in hybrid models
P440e	3.0 L turbo I6	440 PS (324 kW; 434 hp) @ 5500-6500	620 N⋅m (457 lb⋅ft) @ 1500-5000	2,995 cc (3.0 L; 182.8 cu in)	225 km/h (140 mph)	ZF 8-speed automatic transmission	5.8 sec	Plug-in hybrid	AWD	2022–
P460e	3.0 L turbo I6	460 PS (338 kW; 454 hp) @ N/A	550 N⋅m (406 lb⋅ft) @ N/A	2,995 cc (3.0 L; 182.8 cu in)	225 km/h (140 mph)	ZF 8-speed automatic transmission	5.6 sec	Plug-in hybrid	AWD	2022–
P510e	3.0 L turbo I6	510 PS (375 kW; 503 hp) @ 5500-6500	700 N⋅m (516 lb⋅ft) @ 1500-5000	2,995 cc (3.0 L; 182.8 cu in)	242 km/h (150 mph)	ZF 8-speed automatic transmission	5.4 sec	Plug-in hybrid	AWD	2022–
P550e	3.0 L turbo I6	550 PS (405 kW; 542 hp) @ 5500-6500	700 N⋅m (516 lb⋅ft) @ 1500-5000	2,995 cc (3.0 L; 182.8 cu in)	242 km/h (150 mph)	ZF 8-speed automatic transmission	4.7 sec	Plug-in hybrid	AWD	2022–

=== Safety ===
ANCAP test results Range Rover Sport (2022, aligned with Euro NCAP)
Test	Points	%
Overall:	5 /5 stars	
Adult occupant:	32.44	85%
Child occupant:	42.60	86%
Pedestrian:	37.50	69%
Safety assist:	13.54	84%

Euro NCAP test results Range Rover Sport 3.0 Petrol PHEV SE (RHD) (2022)
Test	Points	%
Overall:	5 /5 stars	
Adult occupant:	32.4	85%
Child occupant:	42	85%
Pedestrian:	37.5	69%
Safety assist:	13.2	82%

== Sales ==
Year	Sales
2009	33,460
2010	46,096
2011	54,670
2012	56,832
2013	58,234
2014	82,440
2015	87,319
2016	87,758
2017	81,213
2018	77,847
2019	81,700
Total	747,569
