= Range Rover (L460) =

Fifth-generation Range Rover

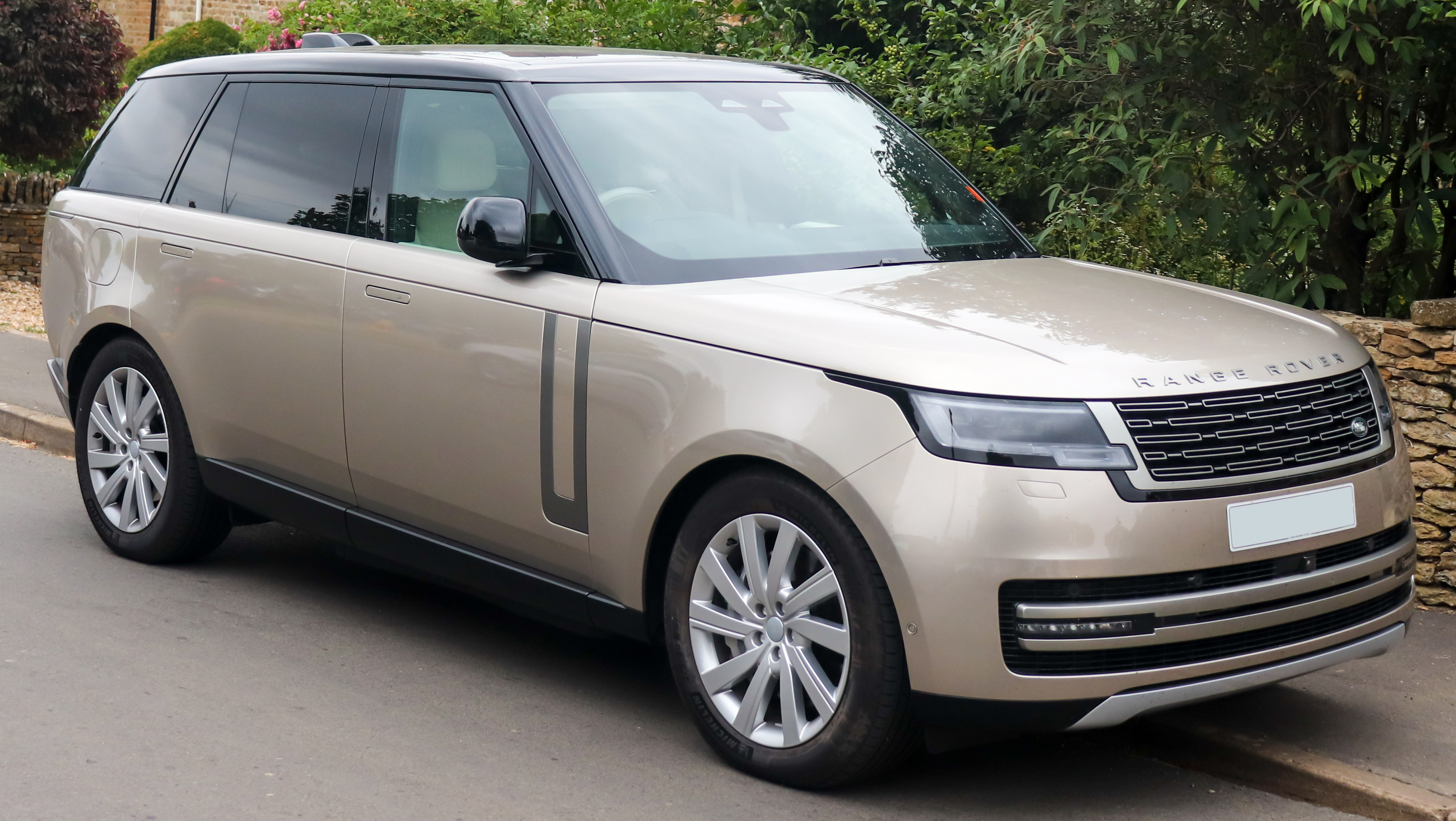

Overview
- Manufacturer: Jaguar Land Rover
- Model code: L460
- Production: 2022–present
- Assembly: United Kingdom: Solihull (Solihull plant); India: Pune (JLR India)
- Designer: Gerry McGovern

Body and chassis
- Class: Full-size luxury SUV
- Body style: 5-door 4x4
- Layout: Front-engine, four-wheel-drive (ICE / PHEV); Dual-motors, four-wheel-drive (EV550)
- Platform: MLA-Flex
- Related: Range Rover Sport (L461)

Powertrain
- Engine: Petrol: 3.0 L AJ300 I6 turbo MHEV; 4.4 L BMW N63 twin-turbo V8; 4.4 L BMW S68 twin-turbo V8; Petrol plug-in hybrid: 3.0 L AJ300 turbo PHEV I6; Diesel: 3.0 L AJ300D twin-turbo I6; 3.0 L AJ300D twin-turbo MHEV I6
- Electric motor: 105 kW (143 PS; 141 hp) permanent magnet synchronous (P440e/510e PHEV); Dual permanent magnet synchronus motors (EV550)
- Power output: 265–453 kW (360–616 PS; 355–607 hp)
- Transmission: 8-speed ZF 8HP automatic
- Hybrid drivetrain: Mild hybrid; Plug-in hybrid (P440e/P460e; P510e/P550e)
- Battery: 38.2 (31.8 usable) kWh Lithium ion (P440e/510e PHEV); 125 (118.5 useable) kWh Double-stacked Li-NMC (EV 550)

Dimensions
- Wheelbase: 2,997 mm (118.0 in) (standard); 3,197 mm (125.9 in) (long)
- Length: 5,052 mm (198.9 in) (standard); 5,252 mm (206.8 in) (long)
- Width: 2,047 mm (80.6 in) (standard); 2,048 mm (80.6 in) (long)
- Height: 1,870 mm (73.6 in)
- Kerb weight: 2,454–2,885 kg (5,410–6,360 lb)

Chronology
- Predecessor: Range Rover (L405); Range Rover Sport (L494) (7-seater)

Range Rover L460 commonly refers to the fifth generation of the Range Rover, a range of full-size, luxury, 4x4 sport utility vehicles produced by Land Rover. It was revealed in London on 26 October 2021. The car is available in two different wheelbases, and the vehicle is available in either petrol, petrol mild hybrid, petrol plug-in hybrid, and diesel mild hybrid powertrains. A seven-seater option was available slightly after launch. In 2026, a battery electric variant known as the Range Rover Electric was unveiled.

== Development and launch ==
The fifth generation Range Rover was revealed on 26 October 2021 by the Jaguar Land Rover Chief Creative Officer and the car's designer, Gerry McGovern, at the Royal Opera House in London. It is built upon Jaguar Land Rover's new MLA-Flex platform, which underpins large vehicles that either use straight-six or V8 engines. Eight PHEV models were available from launch, however As of 2023, the L460 launch consists of 12 models. The car is the first from JLR to use an engine developed under the combustion and electrified powertrain partnership agreed between JLR and BMW in 2019, the 4.4L BMW N63.

At launch, models consisted of the P440e, P510e, P360, P400, P530, D250, D300, and the D350. As of 2023 (late), models consist of the P460e, P550e, P400, P530, P615, D250, D300, and the D350. Produced since mid-2022, the L460 is built at the Solihull plant in Solihull, United Kingdom.

== Overview ==
Internally designated L460, the vehicle is based on the MLA platform, which it shares with the smaller third generation Range Rover Sport. The vehicle is 53 mm (2.1 in) longer, 63 mm (2.5 in) wider, and 35 mm (1.4 in) higher, while its wheelbase has grown by 22 mm (0.87 in). For the long-wheelbase model, as the SWB model, its length has also grown by 53 mm (2.1 in), while its wheelbase as grown by 75 mm (3.0 in). Because of the fact the vehicle is built upon the MLA-Flex platform, the L460 has 50 per cent greater torsional rigidity compared to the outgoing model, with a static rigidity of 50,000 Nm per degree. The new chassis also features a steel front bulkhead with a closed-section arrangement. This helps reduce noise, vibration, and harshness from the road coming into the cabin by about 24 per cent.

For the first time on a Land Rover, the L460 is the first vehicle to offer four-wheel steering. With a turning circle of 10.95 m, or 11.54 m for the long-wheelbase model, the L460 features a double wishbone suspension at the front, while it features a multi-link suspension at the rear. Rear-wheel steering is also available with a turning circle of up to 7.3 degrees. Independent air suspension combines air spring volumes with twin-valve monotube dampers, which are managed by the "Adaptive Dynamics" system. The air suspension also adds variable ride height. The Range Rover also features Range Rover's "iAWD" (Intelligent All-Wheel Drive) system, which is controlled by Land Rover's Intelligent Driveline Dynamics (IDD) system. The system enhances efficiency by disconnecting drive at the front axle at speeds between 35 and 160 km/h (22 and 99 mph), which reduces drag losses by 30 per cent and decrease its CO_{2} emissions by 4g/km.

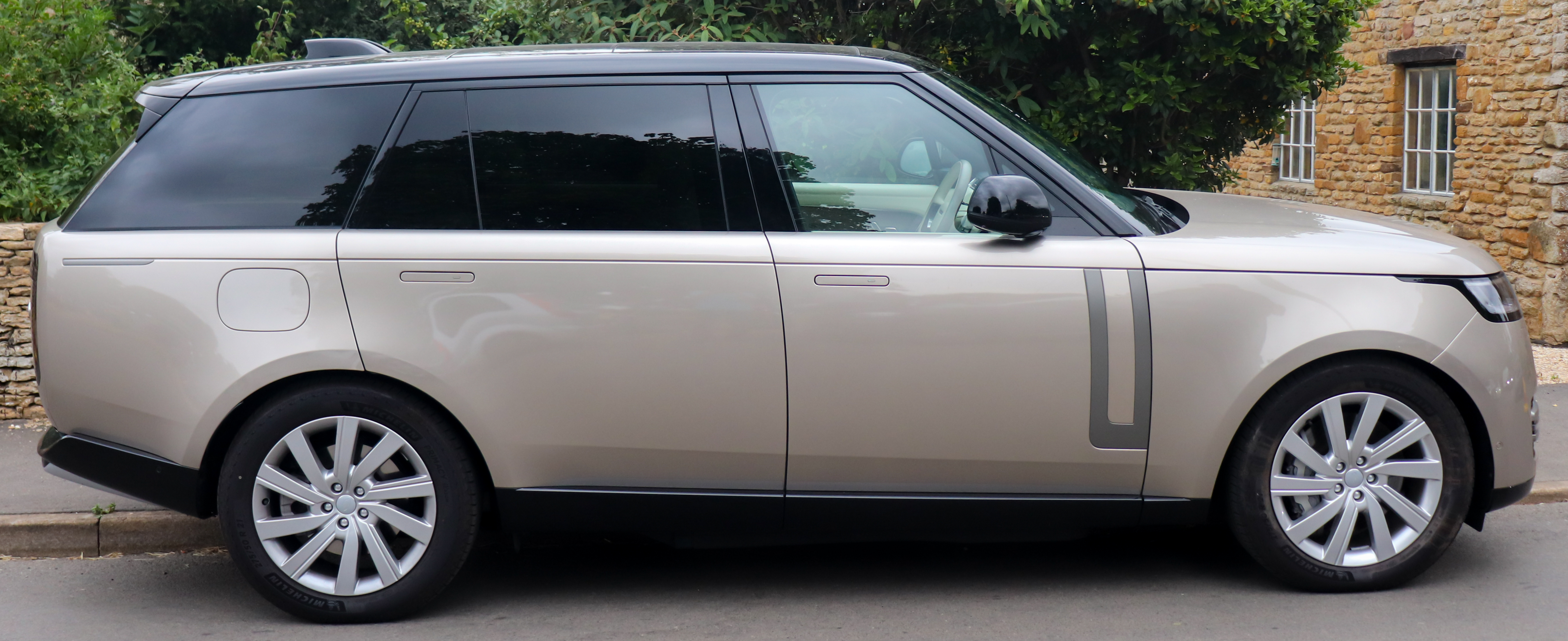
P450e

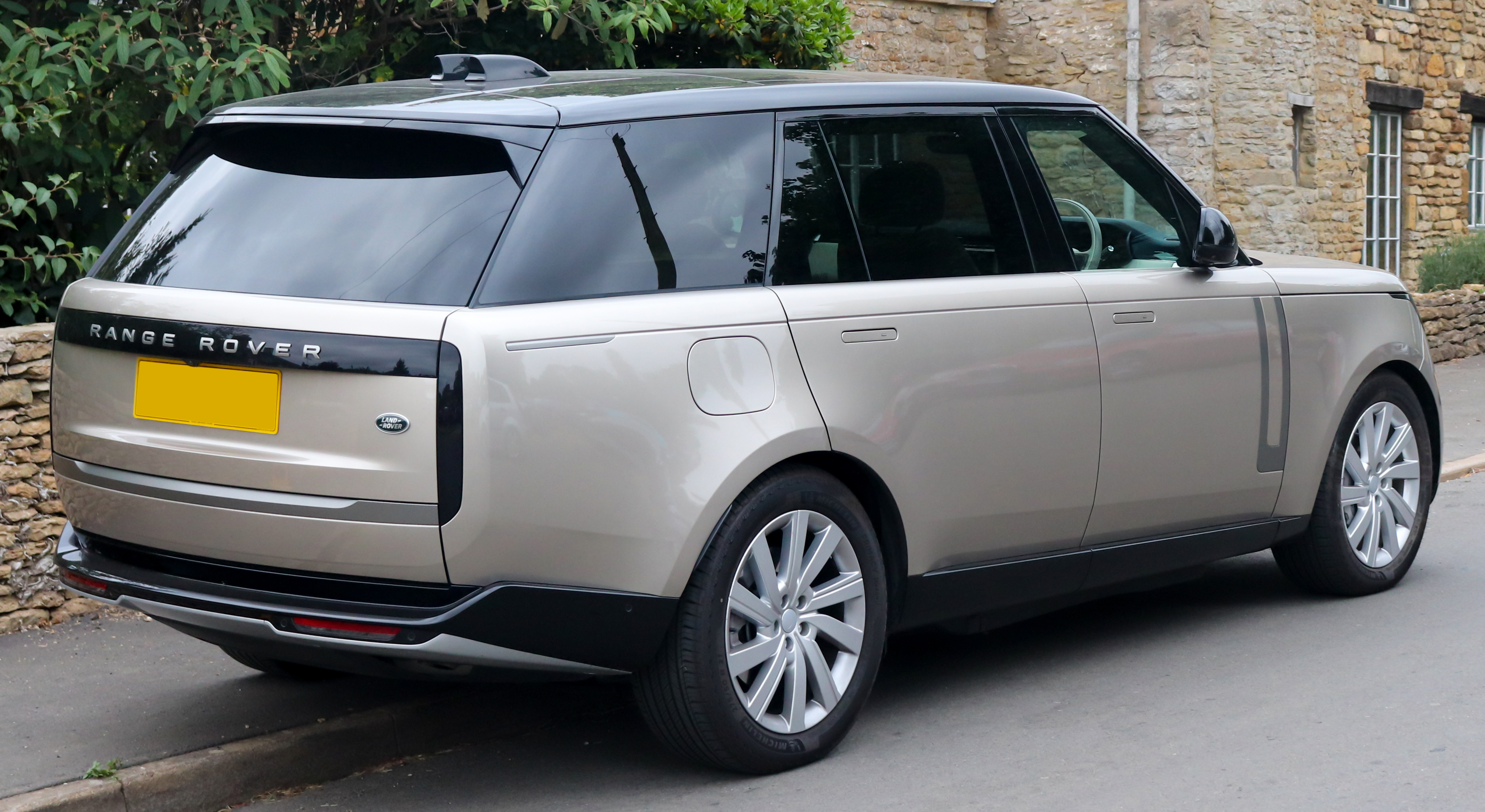
P440e

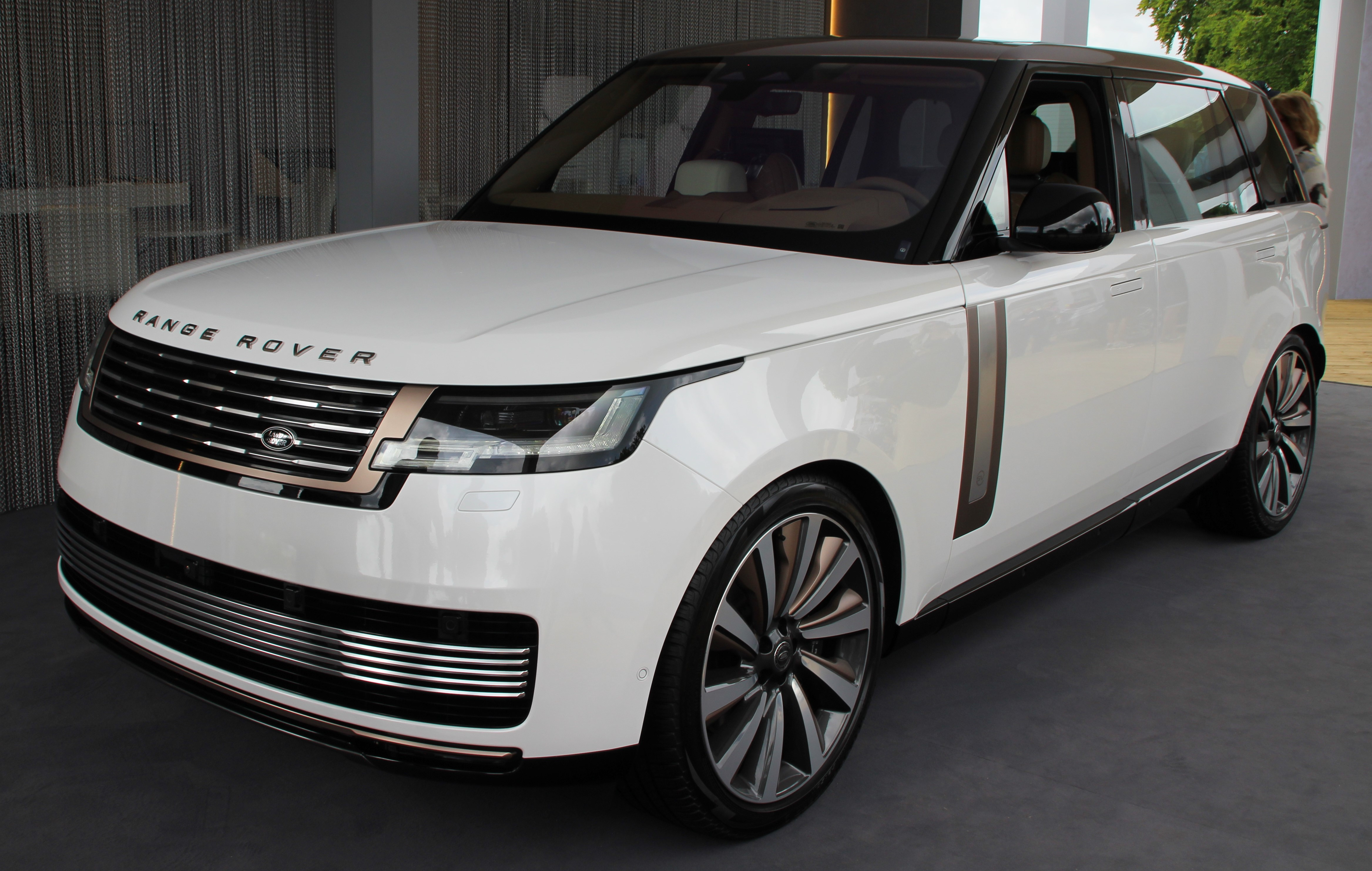
SV

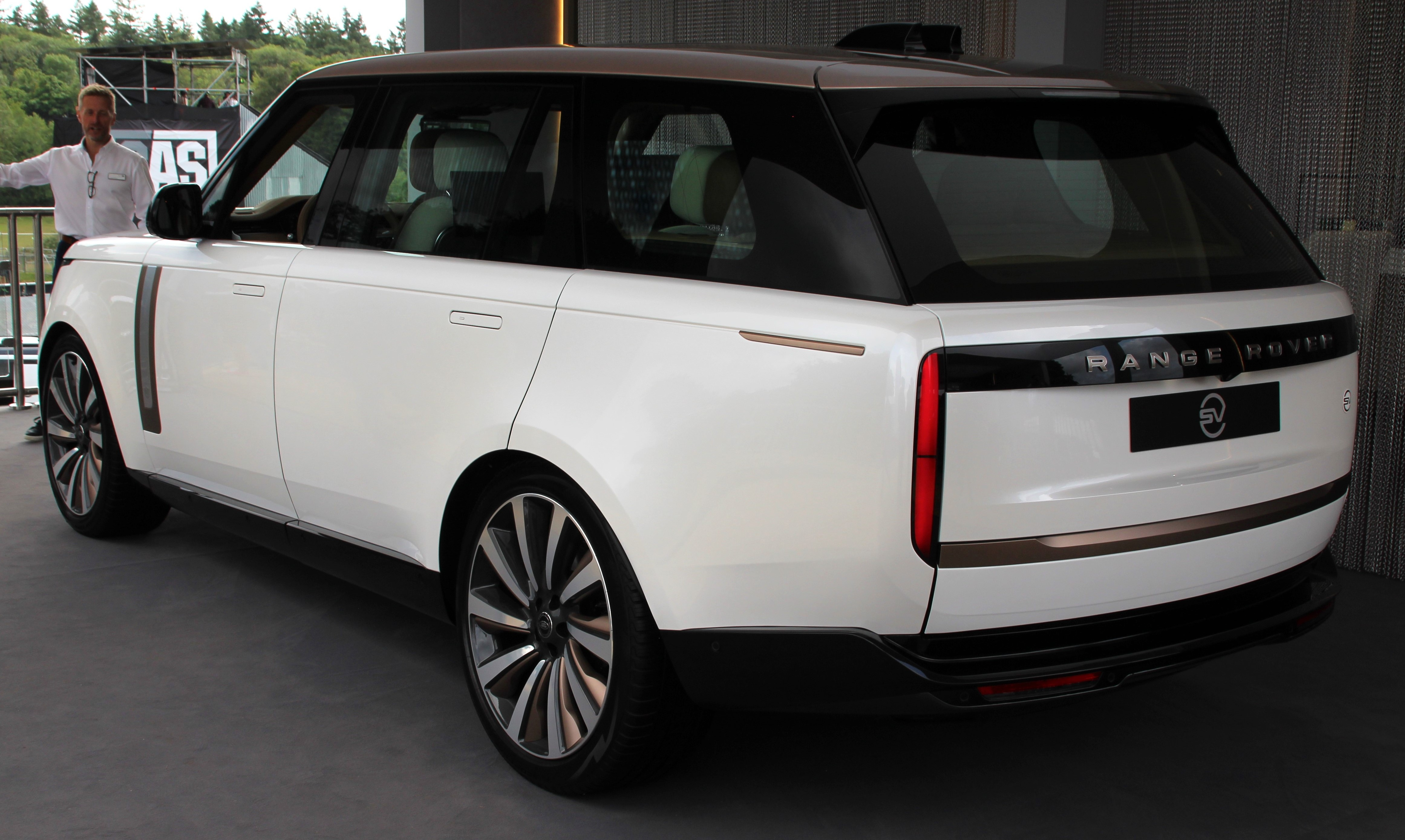
SV

=== Features ===
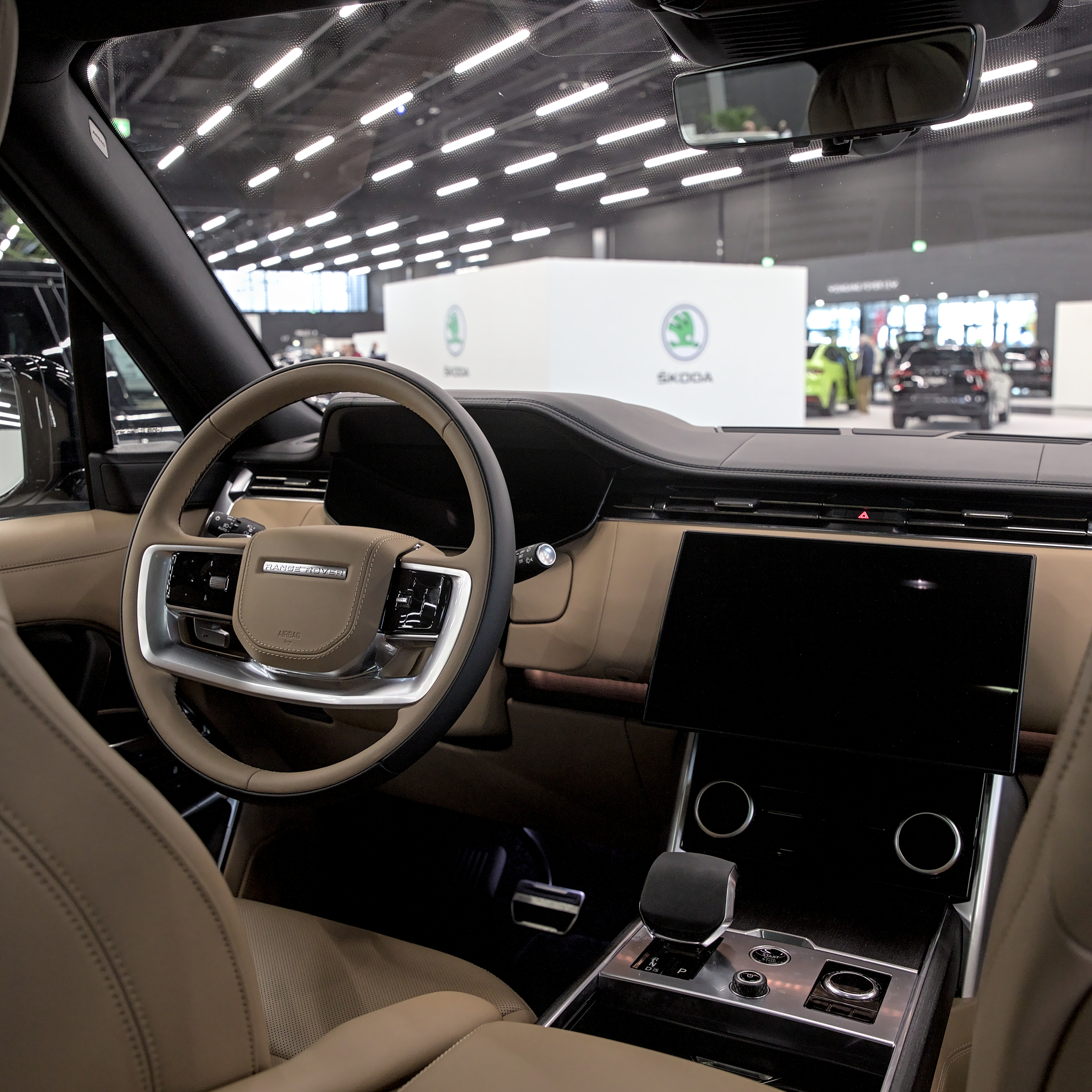
Interior

All models features a 13.1-inch touchscreen, which runs Land Rover's "Pivi Pro" interface. Wireless Apple CarPlay and Android Auto are both available, as well as the Amazon Alexa integration. Additional standard features include navigation, wireless smartphone charging, SiriusXM satellite radio, and a 13.7-inch digital gauge display. Optionally, rear seat entertainment systems with twin 11.4-inch displays are available as well as a Meridian Audio system with 35 speakers and noise cancelling technology are available. Different leather choices are available for interior, however a leather-free option, which adds wool or other vegan materials are available. Available seating configurations, including four, five, or seven are available, possibly depending on configuration and wheelbase. The four-seater arrangement includes a centre console dividing the two rear seats along with an electrically operated tray table and a mini-fridge. The L460 also features 23-inch wheels, upgrading from the 22-inch of the previous iteration.

== Range Rover Electric ==
Mentions of the battery electric version of the fifth generation Range Rover began officially 2021 with a targeted launch in 2024. It was then teased in late 2023, when a wait list was also opened. JLR previewed an 800-volt architecture and a wading depth of 850 mm (33 in). After multiple delays, the Range Rover Electric was officially unveiled on 2 September 2026.

Changes aside from the powertrain are minor, including a smoother front grille, EV-only wheel options, and a reworked underbody. These elements combine to reduce the drag coefficient by 0.01 and increase highway range by up to 10 mi (16 km). The displays also feature EV-only graphics, AI-assisted range prediction and over-the-air updates for the battery. According to Land Rover, compared to its V8 equivalents, it runs at 7 dBA and 2.5 dBA quieter at full throttle and 0.1g acceleration respectively. Rear cargo space is unchanged as the electric drive unit is put in place of the limited slip differential found on internal combustion models.

It also features twin-valve active dampers sourced from the Range Rover Sport SV, as well as dual-chamber air springs and rear-axle steering. While its default ride height and ground clearance are lowered by 15 mm (0.59 in) and 29 mm (1.1 in) respectively, the adjustable ride height makes it so that its maximum wading depth remains identical to that of internal combustion variants, at 900 mm (35 in). Integrated Management (ITM) and Intelligent Driveline Dynamics systems were also added, allowing better traction in slippery conditions, inclines of up to 33 degrees and steep climbs of up to 45 degrees. Its towing capacity is reduced to 2,500 kg (5,500 lb), down from 3,500 kg (7,700 lb) of internal combustion variants and 3,000 kg (6,600 lb) of plug-in hybrid variants.

A modified version of the MLA architecture is used. At launch, only a dual-motor all-wheel-drive powertrain is available, known as the EV550. It uses two electric motors, each producing 260 kW (350 hp), for a total output of 550 PS (540 hp; 400 kW) and 850 N⋅m (630 lb⋅ft) of torque. It can accelerate from 0-60 mph (97 km/h) in 4.3 seconds. A double-stacked lithium-ion battery with a capacity of 118.5 kWh provides up to 372 mi (599 km) and 333 mi (536 km) of WLTP and EPA range respectively. It can charge at up to 350 kW using a DC fast charger, charging from 10%-80% in 22 minutes.

At launch, the EV550 powertrain is available across most trims, including high-end SV models

== 2024 update ==
For the 2024 model year, Land Rover replaced the P440e with the more powerful P550e, while the P615 was added. In the interior, the physical controls for the HVAC system were removed.

The SV Bespoke program was launched, providing buyers with a seven-step process through colours, interiors, materials themes and more. To help promote the SV Bespoke program, Land Rover revealed the limited Carmel Edition at the 2023 Monterey Car Week. Priced at 371,345 USD, only seven models of the Carmel Edition will be built. The Carmel Edition features 23-inch wheels, two-tone upholstery, embroidered pillows, and pearl oyster accents.

== Specifications ==
=== Dimensions ===
The car is available with either the standard wheelbase of 2,997 mm (117.99 in) with a length of 5,052 mm (198.90 in), or the long wheelbase of 3,197 mm (125.87 in) with a length of 5,252 mm (206.77 in). Both variants have a height of 1,870 mm (73.62 in), and width of 2,047 mm (80.59 in).

=== Powertrain ===
The following engine options are available:

		ICE engine			Electric motor		Combined	
Designation	HEV type	Engine type	Fuel	Capacity (L)	Battery (kWh)	Power (kW; PS; bhp)	Power (kW; PS; bhp)	Torque (Nm; lb-ft)
P440e	PHEV	Ingenium I6 turbo	petrol	3.0	38.2	105; 143; 141	324; 440; 434	620; 457
P460e	PHEV	Ingenium I6 turbo	petrol	3.0	38.2	163; 221; 218	338; 459; 453	550; 406
P510e	PHEV	Ingenium I6 turbo	petrol	3.0	38.2	105; 143; 141	375; 510; 503	700; 516
P550e	PHEV	Ingenium I6 turbo	petrol	3.0	38.2	163; 221; 218	410; 560; 550	800; 590
P360	MHEV	Ingenium I6 turbo	petrol	3.0	-	-	265; 360; 355	500; 369
P400	MHEV	Ingenium I6 turbo	petrol	3.0	-	-	295; 400; 395	550; 406
P530 (2022–2023)	MHEV	BMW N63 V8 twin-turbo	petrol	4.4	-	-	390; 530; 523	750; 553
P615 (2024–present)	MHEV	BMW S68 V8 twin-turbo	petrol	4.4	-	-	453; 615; 607	750; 553
D250	MHEV (Note: Also available without MHEV configuration)	Ingenium I6 twin-turbo	diesel	3.0	-	-	183; 249; 246	601; 443
D300	MHEV	Ingenium I6 twin-turbo	diesel	3.0	-	-	221; 300; 296	649; 479
D350	MHEV	Ingenium I6 twin-turbo	diesel	3.0	-	-	257; 350; 345	700; 516
EV550	N/A	2x Permanent magnet synchronus motors	Electric	3.0	125	260; 354; 349	404; 550; 542	850; 627

All engines are coupled with an eight-speed automatic gearbox with a low-range capability, and supply power to the wheels through an all-wheel-drive system which can decouple the front axle to improve efficiency under certain driving conditions. The plug-in hybrid variants use a 38.2-kilowatt-hour lithium-ion battery (with 31.8 kWh usable).

== Safety ==
ANCAP test results Land Rover Range Rover all variants (2022, aligned with Euro NCAP)
Test	Points	%
Overall:	5 /5 stars	
Adult occupant:	32.12	84%
Child occupant:	42.20	86%
Pedestrian:	39.13	72%
Safety assist:	13.54	84%

Euro NCAP test results Range Rover D300 SE (RHD) (2022)
Test	Points	%
Overall:	5 /5 stars	
Adult occupant:	32.1	84%
Child occupant:	43	87%
Pedestrian:	39.1	72%
Safety assist:	13.2	82%
