= GCDA =

GCDA may refer to:

- Government Car and Despatch Agency, an executive agency of the UK Department for Transport
- Greater Cochin Development Authority, statutory body overseeing the development of the City of Kochi in the state of Kerala, India
