= Prime Ministerial Car =

Car used by the UK Prime Minister

Range Rover Sentinel
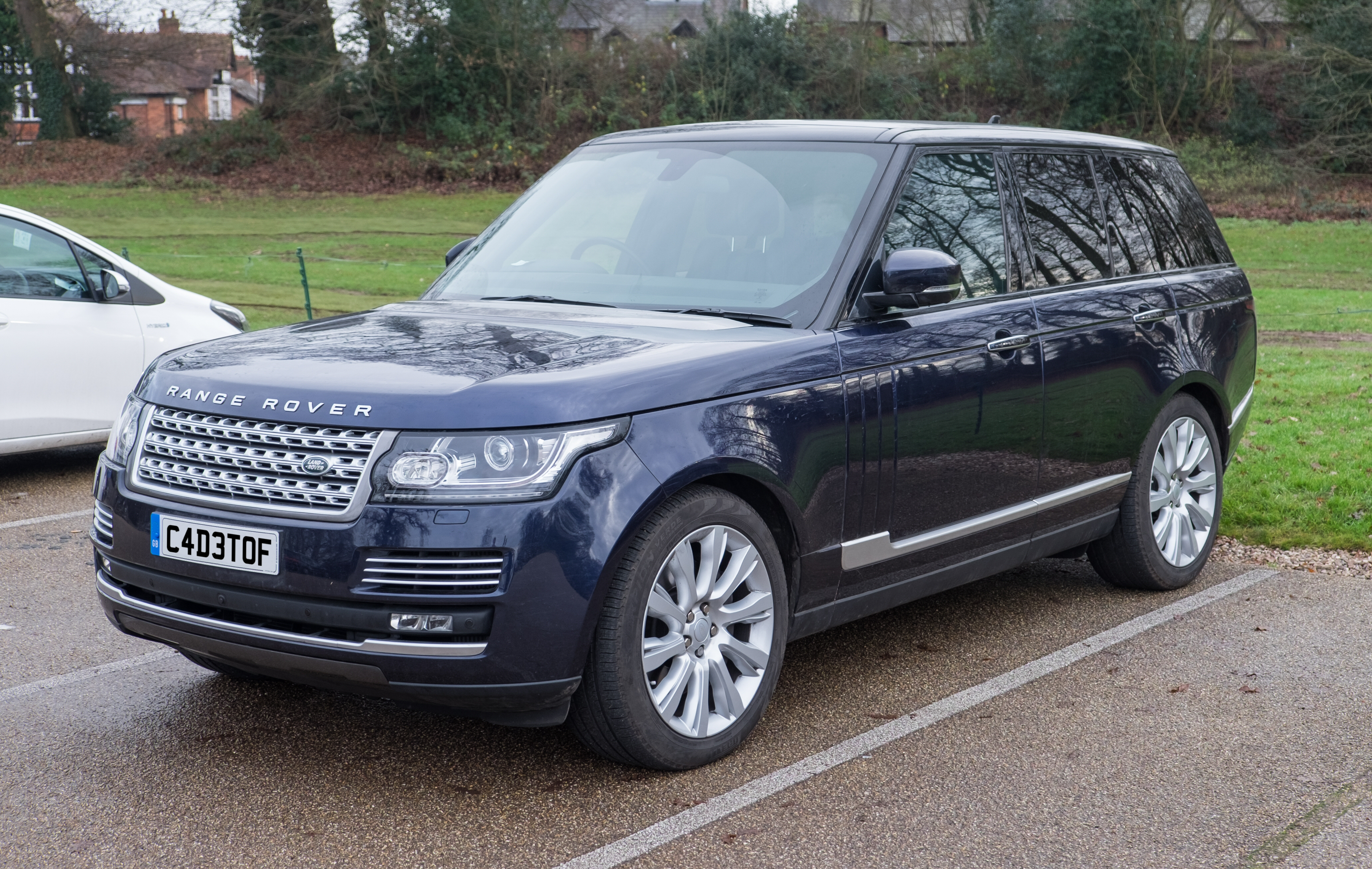

Overview
- Type: Range Rover (L405)
- Manufacturer: Land Rover
- Production: 2019

Powertrain
- Engine: 5.0 L 380 PS (279 kW; 375 hp) supercharged AJ Gen III V8 (petrol)
- Transmission: 8-speed automatic

Chronology
- Predecessor: Jaguar XJ (X351) (Cameron/May/Johnson); Jaguar XJ (X308) (Brown/Blair); Jaguar XJ (X300) (Thatcher/Major/Blair); Rover P5 (3.5 Litre) (Wilson/Heath/Callaghan)

Until 2023, British manufactured cars had always been used as prime ministerial cars by the prime ministers of the United Kingdom. The cars currently used are armoured, custom built Range Rover Sentinel supercharged 5.0 litre V8 models and armoured Audi A8L models.

Prime ministerial and ministerial limousines are operated and administered by the Government Car Service, overseen by the Cabinet Office, and stored and maintained at 10 Downing Street. The cars are driven by officers from the Metropolitan Police Royalty & Specialist Protection branch (RaSP), skilled in protection convoy, anti hijack and evasive driving skills.

They are escorted by three to four unmarked Range Rover or Ford Galaxy models and at least nine to ten RaSP officers, with the ability to utilise motorcycle outriders from the Metropolitan Police Special Escort Group to aid in the swift travel and protection of the motorcade.

In December 2022, the UK government announced that it would purchase armoured Audi A8L models for use by ministers, on the basis that no UK manufacturer could meet revised security specifications. Prime Minister Rishi Sunak was first seen to use an Audi A8 model in July 2023, although the Range Rover Sentinels are still in use by the Prime Minister.

== General specifications ==
Many details are classified, but the current Range Rover Sentinel models are estimated to have cost up to £400,000. They feature a number of security features, including a 13 mm explosive resistant steel plate underneath the body, titanium and Kevlar lined cabins, armoured windows with bullet resistant polycarbonate toughened glass, and run flat tyres. The bodywork can withstand hits from 7.62mm high-velocity, armour-piercing rounds.

The cars are also equipped with an independent, self contained oxygen supply, to safeguard occupants in the event of a chemical or biological attack.

The vehicles used to be classed as B7 level but under the new system, called VPAM, they are classed as VPAM9, and are understood to be capable of withstanding the blast of 15 kg equivalent TNT, and sustained attack by a variety of other armour piercing weapons.

== Previous cars ==
Since the early-1980s, when Margaret Thatcher switched from the Rover P5 models that had been in use since the 1960s, all prime ministerial cars came from the Jaguar XJ range of the day, or its Daimler-badged variant.

The 2000 model replaced a British racing green XJ40 model, built for John Major, which gained international media attention when it bore Tony Blair to Buckingham Palace on the day after the 1997 general election. For the first few months of his premiership in 2007, Gordon Brown reverted to the previous prime ministerial car, a navy blue (X308) model purchased in 2000, before starting to use the silver model. A British racing green X308 took Gordon Brown to Buckingham Palace on 6 April 2010 to request the dissolution of Parliament, but it was the 2000 model that took him on his last ride as Prime Minister.

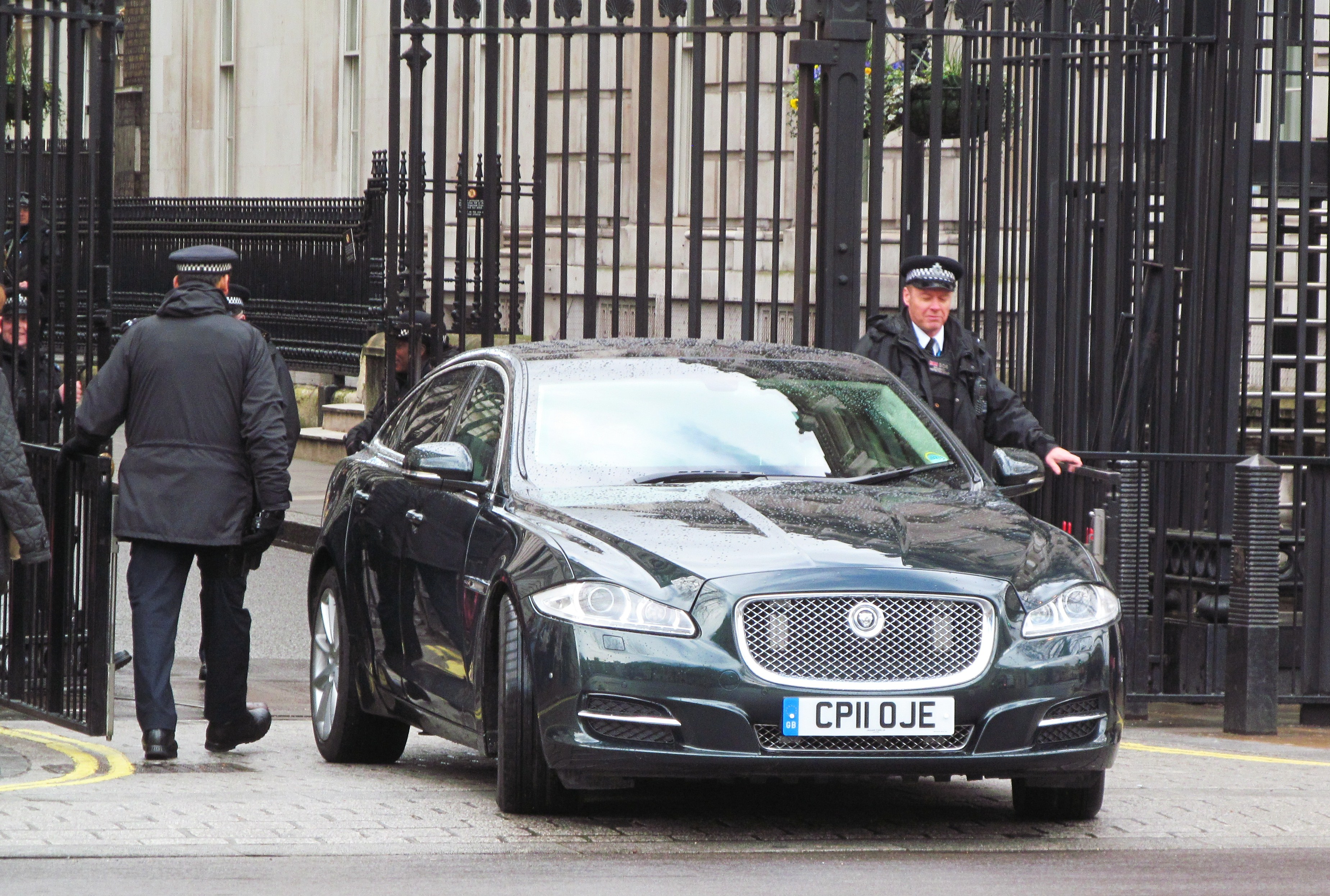
Jaguar XJ at Downing Street, 2014

David Cameron arrived at 10 Downing Street following his appointment in a silver 2010 Jaguar XJ X350 model, but a new X351 Sentinel model was delivered on 13 May 2010.

The X351 model had a 5.0 litre supercharged petrol engine producing 375 bhp, with a top speed of 121 miles per hour (195 km/h), and is capable of reaching 60 miles per hour (97 km/h) from a stationary position in 9.4 seconds, slower than the original due to the substantially greater weight of the vehicle.

On 12 August 2011, one of the previous Jaguar XJ Sentinel fleet was damaged when its driver dented the car on a high kerb in Salford, although the car was able to be driven away. On 17 June 2020, Boris Johnson was in one of the vehicles when a crash occurred due to a protester running in front of the motorcade.

=== Current and previous cars ===
- Humber Pullman – Winston Churchill, Clement Attlee, Anthony Eden, Harold Macmillan, Alec Douglas-Home
- Humber Super Snipe – Harold Macmillan, Alec Douglas-Home, Harold Wilson
- Rover P5 – Harold Wilson, Edward Heath, James Callaghan, Margaret Thatcher
- Jaguar XJ (Series III) – Margaret Thatcher, John Major
- Jaguar XJ (XJ40) – Margaret Thatcher, John Major, Tony Blair
- Jaguar XJ (X308) – Tony Blair, Gordon Brown, David Cameron
- Jaguar XJ (X350) – Tony Blair, Gordon Brown, David Cameron
- Jaguar XJ (X351) – David Cameron, Theresa May, Boris Johnson
- Range Rover Sentinel (L405) – Boris Johnson, Liz Truss, Rishi Sunak, Keir Starmer, Andy Burnham
- Audi A8L – Rishi Sunak, Keir Starmer, Andy Burnham

== See also ==
- Official state car
- Bentley State Limousine, the car used by King Charles III
- Government of the United Kingdom
- Air transports of heads of state and government
