= Jaguar XJ (electric) =

Battery electric executive sedan

Overview
- Manufacturer: Jaguar Land Rover
- Production: 2020 (cancelled)
- Assembly: United Kingdom: Birmingham (Castle Bromwich Assembly)

Body and chassis
- Class: Executive car
- Layout: Dual-motor, four-wheel-drive
- Platform: Jaguar Land Rover MLA

Powertrain
- Electric motor: 2 × Permanent magnet synchronous
- Battery: 90.2 kWh lithium ion
- Electric range: 290 mi (467 km)

Chronology
- Predecessor: Jaguar XJ (X351)

The electric Jaguar XJ was a battery-electric luxury saloon car due to be launched in 2021 by British car company Jaguar Land Rover (JLR) under their Jaguar Cars marque. It was to supersede the XJ (X351), the last example of which was built in July 2019. In February 2021, CEO Thierry Bolloré announced that this car was cancelled as part of Jaguar's Reimagine plan, although the XJ name may be revived at a later date.

== History ==
A prototype based on the contemporary XJ (X351) was built in 2010; the X351-based vehicle was equipped with a 145 kW (194 hp), 400 N⋅m (295 lb⋅ft) traction motor and included a three-cylinder, 35 kW (47 hp) range extending gasoline engine. It was said to have a range of 600 mi (970 km) with a combined fuel economy of 57 mpg_{‑imp} (5.0 L/100 km; 47 mpg_{‑US}).

=== Project X391 ===
On 5 July 2019, the last day of production of their Jaguar XJ (X351) car at their Castle Bromwich Assembly site, JLR announced they intended to build its replacement, an all-electric luxury saloon car, at the same plant. JLR had confirmed its plans previously in May. A teaser image of the model was shown at the 2019 Frankfurt Auto Show. The car was originally expected to be launched in 2020. According to The Verge, the new model was being "developed by the same team that created the I-Pace" and JLR were planning to make a new range of electrified vehicles at the plant. The project was codenamed X391, and was being developed alongside the Land Rover Road Rover (project code L392), which was detailed in October 2019.

JLR had planned to update the Castle Bromwich plant to produce the car on the company's new Modular Longitudinal Architecture (MLA) platform. The plan to build the electric Jaguar XJ saloon, replacing the manufacturing of the conventional XJ at this plant, was viewed as essential for "safeguarding the jobs of 2,500 people", or 2,700 people according to BBC News. Manufacturing of the new model had been expected to start in autumn 2019, after a significant investment in upgrades to the facility. David Bailey, a professor of business economics at Birmingham Business School, said that, without the new electric model, the Castle Bromwich plant would "effectively be dead". The COVID-19 pandemic in the United Kingdom forced JLR to halt non-essential spending, delaying the scheduled unveiling of X391 and L392 by two months to October and November 2020.

By January 2021, X391 had failed to launch and speculation on the fate of Castle Bromwich and the upcoming electric XJ began; X391 was cancelled formally in February; Bolloré had made the decision to discontinue development within his first month with JLR: "XJ was a completely different kind of car from the ones we were proposing – different in technology, battery chemistry, electronics, size, performance and market position. It would never have suited our plans." During an investor call, JLR CFO Adrian Mardell stated the cancellation of X391 and L392 would result in a write-off of £1,000,000,000 in development costs. Mardell clarified Bolloré's stance: "The current MLA program ... would have been catch-up in [emissions] compliance and that just isn't good enough in this industry today" and added "[X391] wouldn't have that modern luxury, that future Jaguar vision, that drop-dead aspiration that we need to make this brand work ... So we had to make a tough decision." After the electric XJ was cancelled, JLR announced that it would "end mass production of cars at (Castle Bromwich) before 2025".

In early 2022, JLR announced that under the Reimagine plan, the planned all-electric line-up by 2025 would be based on an internally-developed platform known as Panthera. Bolloré stated that Panthera would not be shared with Land Rover, as it was designed to allow Jaguar to provide "unique proportions" and capabilities, and would help the marque survive as it moved to a higher price point and lower volume. The upcoming Panthera-based flagship of the Jaguar line is anticipated to be called the XJ. Later in February, Jaguar stated it would develop Panthera jointly with Magna Steyr, which assembles the I-Pace under contract to JLR in Austria.

== Design ==
In March 2020, a prototype X391 was photographed while undergoing testing on public roads. Although the car's features were obscured, Autocar commented that the prototype's "long bonnet and high waistline aren't unlike those of the outgoing XJ", and the X391 would have been wider and taller than the X351. MLA was designed to accommodate underfloor batteries up to 90.2 kW-hr in size, providing up to 290 mi (470 km) of range using one traction motor on each axle.
