= Jaguar XJ (X351) =

Saloon car

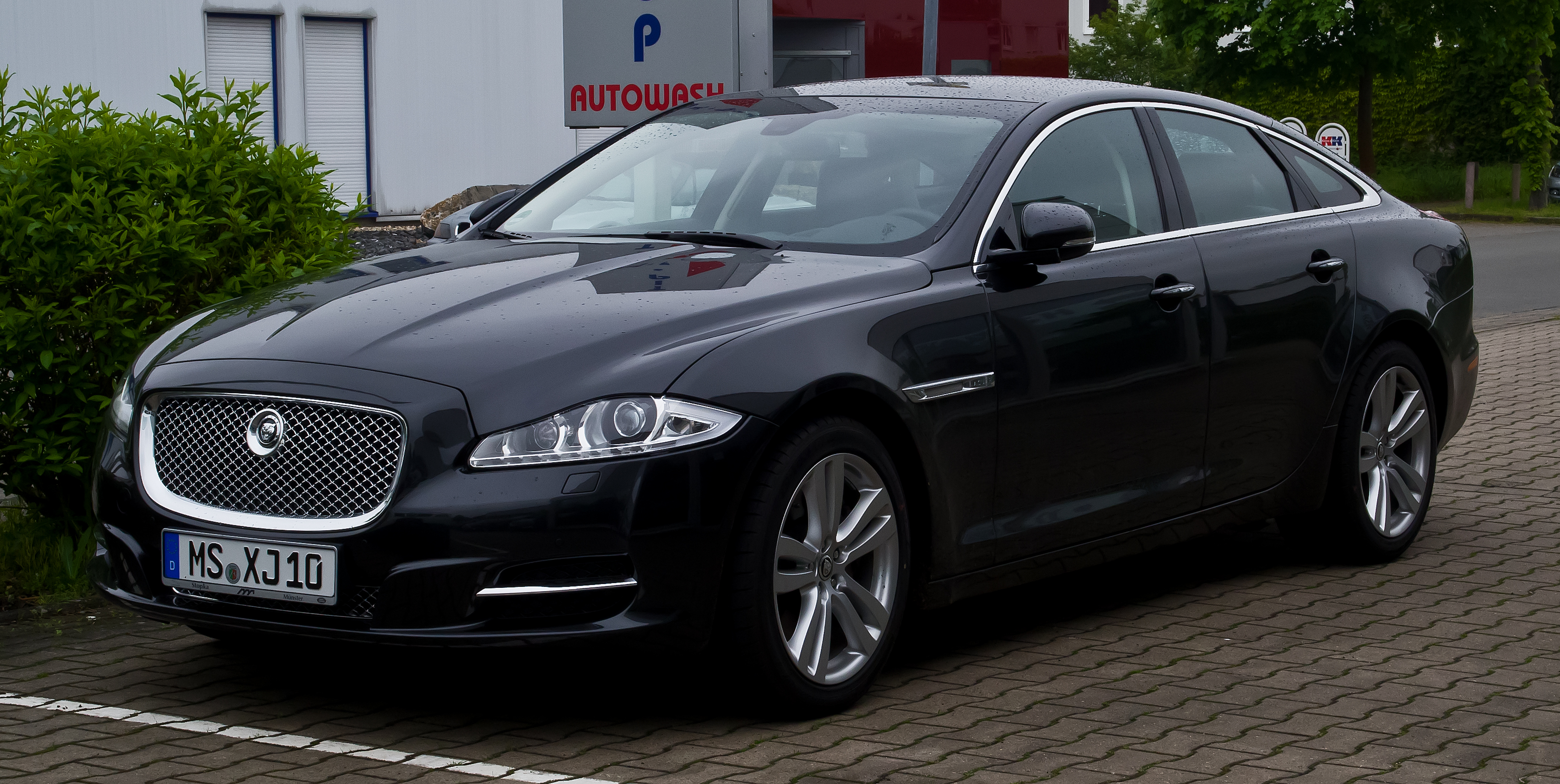

Overview
- Manufacturer: Jaguar Cars (2009–2012); Jaguar Land Rover (2013–2019)
- Model code: X351
- Production: September 2009 – July 2019
- Model years: 2010–2019
- Assembly: United Kingdom: Birmingham (Castle Bromwich Assembly); India: Pune (JLR India)
- Designer: Ian Callum (design director: 2005–2008); Giles Taylor (2006, 2008)

Body and chassis
- Class: Full-size luxury car (F)
- Body style: 4-door saloon
- Layout: Front-engine, rear-wheel-drive / all-wheel-drive
- Platform: JLR D2a

Powertrain
- Engine: Petrol: 3.0 L AJ supercharged V6; 5.0 L AJ Gen III V8; 5.0 L AJ Gen III supercharged V8; Diesel: 3.0 L AJD twin-turbo V6
- Transmission: 6-speed automatic 8-speed automatic (2013 onwards)

Dimensions
- Wheelbase: XJ: 3,032 mm (119.4 in); XJ-L: 3,157 mm (124.3 in)
- Length: XJ: 5,130 mm (202 in); XJ-L: 5,255 mm (206.9 in)
- Width: 1,899 mm (74.8 in); with mirrors: 2,110 mm (83 in)
- Height: 1,461 mm (57.5 in)
- Kerb weight: XJ: Diesel: 1,796 kg (3,960 lb); Petrol: 1,755 kg (3,869 lb); Supercharged: 1,892 kg (4,171 lb); XJ-L: Diesel: 1,813 kg (3,997 lb); Petrol: 1,773 kg (3,909 lb); Supercharged: 1,915 kg (4,222 lb)

Chronology
- Predecessor: Jaguar XJ (X350) / Jaguar XJ (X358)

The Jaguar XJ (X351) is a saloon car built by British manufacturer Jaguar Cars, later known as Jaguar Land Rover, from 2010 to 2019. It is the fourth and final generation of the Jaguar XJ model. Referred to internally within Jaguar as the X351, it was announced in 2009 before going on sale in 2010, and combined revised styling with underpinnings of the previous Jaguar X350 generation. The model was discontinued in 2019. It was the final generation of the XJ, after the electric Jaguar XJ was cancelled in February 2021.

== Overview ==
Jaguar invited Jay Leno to unveil the new XJ during the launch at the Saatchi Gallery in London on 9 July 2009. The event was broadcast live on the Jaguar website. The US model was unveiled at the 2009 Pebble Beach Concours d'Elegance.

Production of the car was due to begin in September 2009, with first deliveries being made in early 2010. Production later began in 2010, with the car arriving in dealer showrooms in May 2010. Production was initially carried out only at the Castle Bromwich Assembly plant in Birmingham, England. From 2014, CKD assembly commenced at Jaguar Land Rover's facility in Pune, India.

=== Design ===
The XJ was designed at Jaguar Land Rover's Whitley plant in Coventry by a team led by design director Ian Callum. Design work began in 2005, with final design approval taking place in November 2006 and the design being frozen in the first half of 2008. The new design is a complete departure from any earlier XJ model; mechanically, the car is a development of its predecessor.

=== Models ===
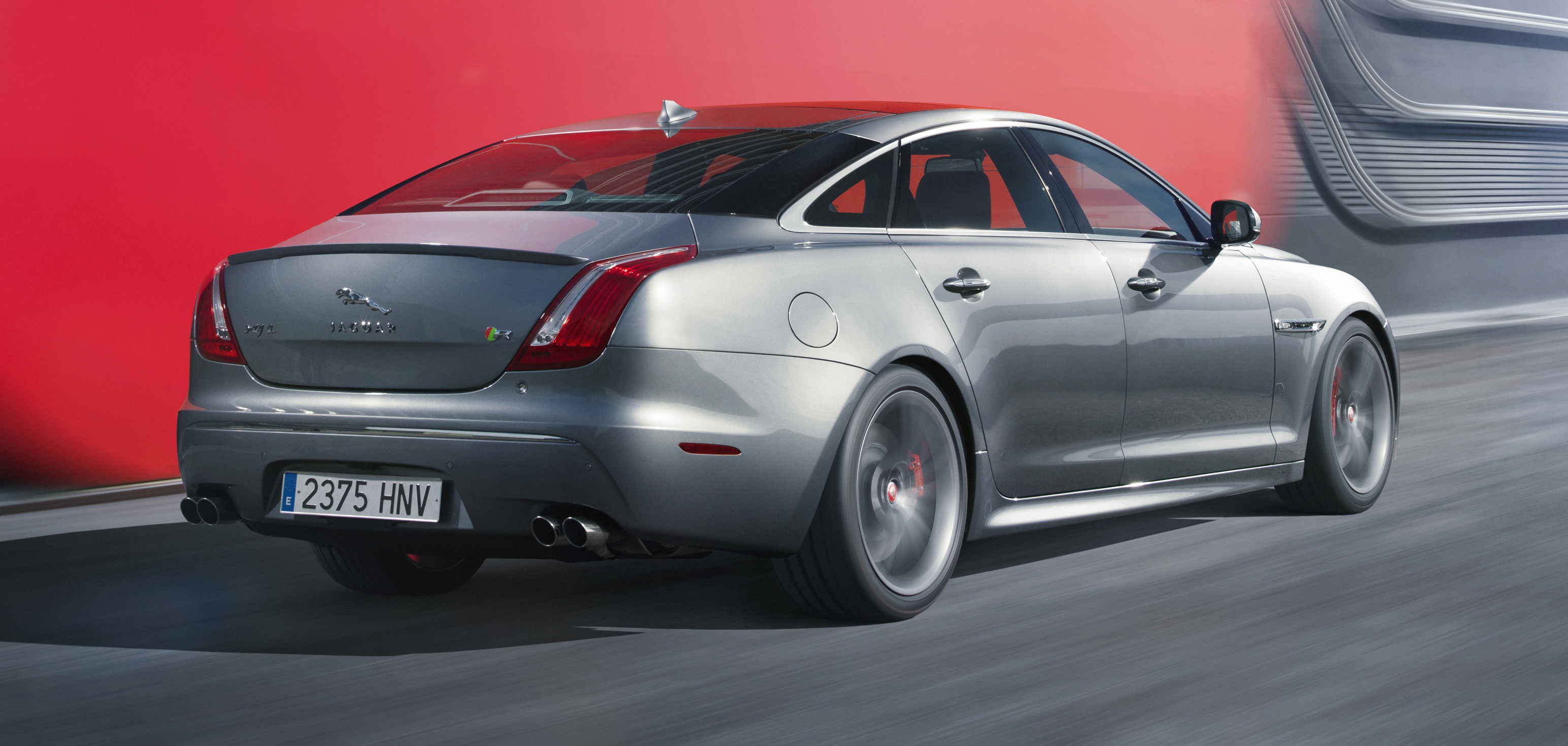
Standard wheelbase XJR model

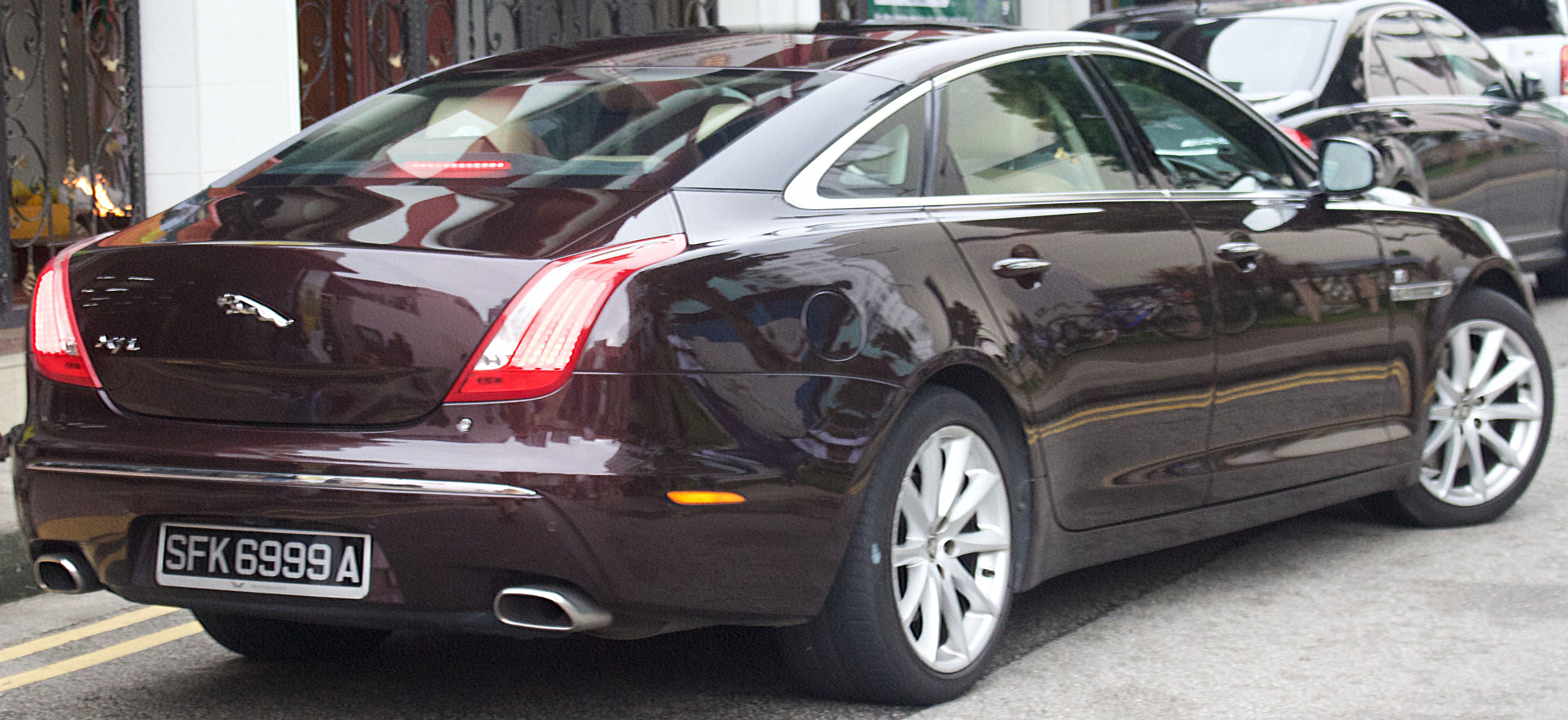
Long wheelbase XJ (X351) model

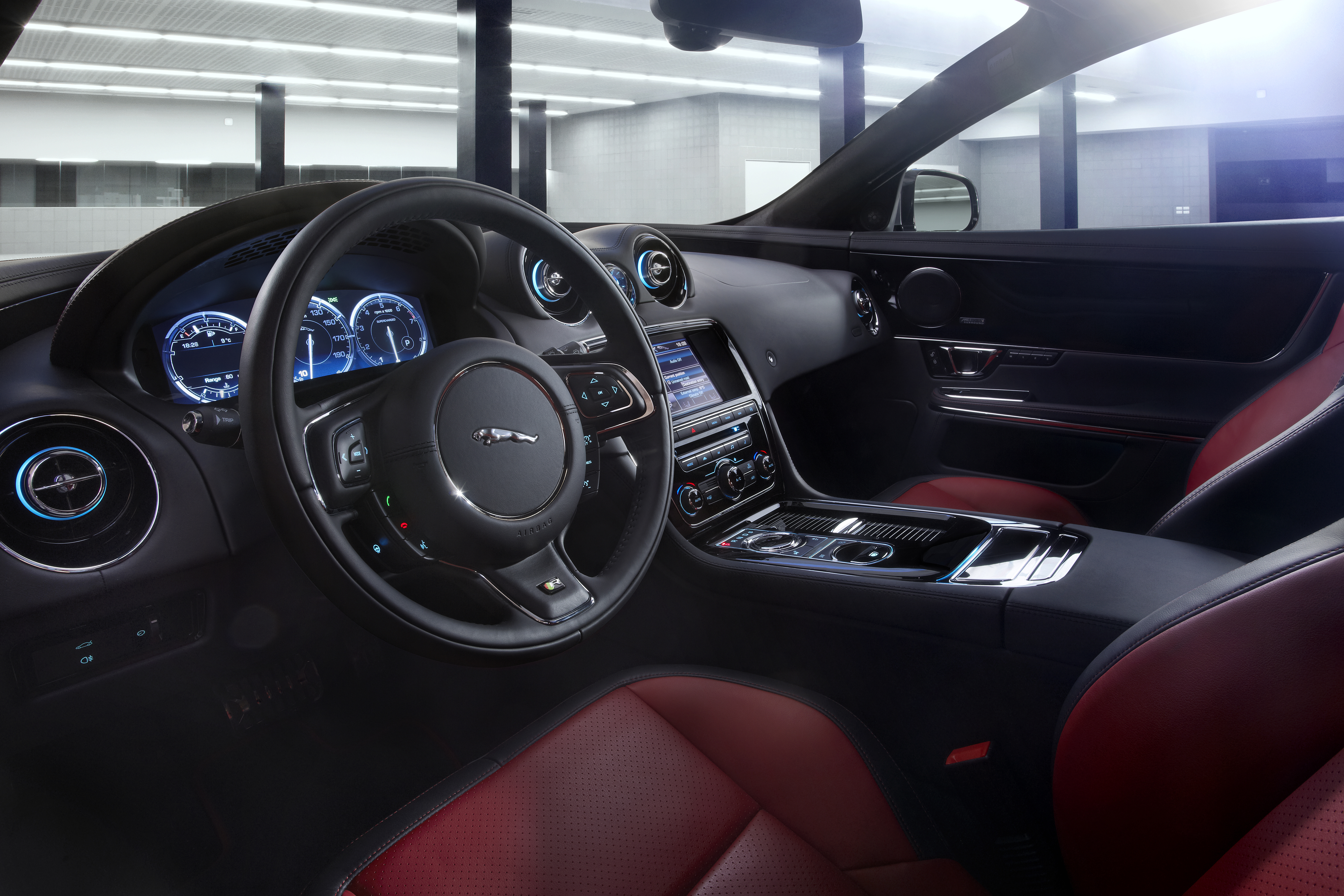
Interior of the XJR unveiled at the New York Auto Show

In addition to the standard version with a 3,035 mm (119.5 in) wheelbase, a long-wheelbase version was available with a 3,160 mm (124 in) wheelbase. At the 2010 Moscow Motor Show, a high security version of the car called the XJ Sentinel was introduced. This is an armoured version of Long Wheelbase XJ with B7-level ballistic protection as well as providing protection against 15 kg TNT or equivalent explosive. It has the 5.0 L supercharged V8 engine shared with the XJ Supersport having a power output of 510 PS (375 kW) and 19-inch wheels with Dunlop Self Supporting Technology run-flat tyres. Unlike other full-size flagship executive cars, the long-wheelbase variant was designed first and was expected to make up 67 percent of sales in the US market.

Models	Luxury	Premium Luxury	Portfolio	Supersport	Sentinel
Engines	3.0 L diesel V6	3.0 L diesel V6, 5.0 L V8	3.0 L diesel V6, 5.0 L V8, 5.0 L supercharged V8	3.0 L diesel V6, 5.0 L supercharged V8	5.0 L supercharged V8
Wheels (standard)	Meru 18-inch alloy	Aleutian 19-inch alloy	Kasuga 20-inch alloy	Mataiva 20-inch alloy	Aleutian 19-inch alloy

=== Engines ===
The engine used by the X351 are enlarged and upgraded versions of the previously used V8 petrol and V6 diesel engines.

Model	Type (displacement, bore × stroke)	Power and torque (at rpm)	Acceleration 0–100 km/h (62 mph) (seconds)	Top speed
3.0-litre twin-turbocharged V6 Diesel AJ-V6D GEN III	2,993 cc (2.993 L; 182.6 cu in), 84 mm × 90 mm (3.3 in × 3.5 in)	275 PS (202 kW; 271 hp) at 4,000, 600 N⋅m (443 lbf⋅ft) at 2,000	6.4	250 km/h (155 mph)
3.0-litre Supercharged V6 Petrol AJ126	2,995 cc (2.995 L; 182.8 cu in), 84.5 mm × 89 mm (3.33 in × 3.50 in)	340 PS (250 kW; 340 hp) at 6,500, 450 N⋅m (330 lbf⋅ft) at 3,500-5,000	5.9	250 km/h (155 mph)
5.0-litre V8 Petrol AJ-V8 GEN III	5,000 cc (5.0 L; 310 cu in), 92.5 mm × 93 mm (3.64 in × 3.66 in)	385 PS (283 kW; 380 hp) at 6,500, 515 N⋅m (380 lbf⋅ft) at 3,500	5.7	250 km/h (155 mph)
5.0-litre Supercharged V8 Petrol AJ-V8 GEN III	5,000 cc (5.0 L; 310 cu in), 92.5 mm × 93 mm (3.64 in × 3.66 in)	470 PS (346 kW; 464 hp) at 6,000–6,500, 575 N⋅m (424 lbf⋅ft) at 2,500–5,500	5.2	250 km/h (155 mph)
5.0-litre Supercharged V8 Petrol AJ-V8 GEN III	5,000 cc (5.0 L; 310 cu in) V8 supercharged, 92.5 mm × 93 mm (3.64 in × 3.66 in)	510 PS (375 kW; 503 hp) at 6,000–6,500, 625 N⋅m (461 lbf⋅ft) at 2,500–5,500	4.9	250 km/h (155 mph) [280 km/h (174 mph) for the XJR]
5.0-litre Supercharged V8 Petrol AJ-V8 GEN III	5,000 cc (5.0 L; 310 cu in) V8 supercharged, 92.5 mm × 93 mm (3.64 in × 3.66 in)	550 PS (405 kW; 542 hp) at 6,000–6,500, 625 N⋅m (461 lbf⋅ft) at 2,500–5,500	4.6	280 km/h (174 mph)

=== Transmission and top speed ===
All 2010 models of the Jaguar XJ include standard six-speed automatic transmission with Jaguar Sequential Shift carried over from the X350, the main change being steering wheel shift paddles rather than the J-gate gear selector. The XJ has an electronically limited top speed of 250 km/h (155 mph); the limiter has been raised to 280 km/h (174 mph) for the XJR model. An eight speed automatic transmission was introduced from 2013 onwards.

=== Chassis ===
The XJ features a lightweight aluminium floorpan and body (with 50% recycled material content) based on the X350 chassis and retaining a proportion of the earlier floor pan. The biggest change is reversion to steel coil springs for the front suspension, retaining air suspension for the rear only. Continuously variable damping is electronically controlled as before but with driver selectable modes. The aluminium alloy uni-body makes the XJ L among the lightest of the full-size executive saloons despite its exterior proportions, weighing in at 1,874 kg (4,131 lb), which is 111 kg (245 lb) lighter than the mid-size/executive BMW 550i.

=== Equipment ===
Driver information and entertainment is provided by a Bowers & Wilkins 1,200-watt, 20-speaker Dolby 7.1 surround-sound system, along with a bi-directional touch screen display on which the driver can only see the vehicle functions and satellite navigation data; a front passenger can simultaneously view a DVD movie or a television transmission. Standard equipment levels on the United States-spec XJ L with the base engine includes a panoramic dual-pane moonroof, lane-departure warning, navigation, quad-zone climate control, and power sunshades, which is considered to be generous at this price point compared to other flagship executive saloons.

=== Fuel economy and emissions ===
The diesel engine version had a fuel economy of better than 40 mpg_{‑imp} (7.1 L/100 km; 33 mpg_{‑US}) and a CO_{2} emission rating of 184 g/km.

=== Special uses ===
The car has been used by British prime ministers. Dating back to the Jaguar XJ (Series III), various versions of the XJ were used by Margaret Thatcher, John Major, Tony Blair, and Gordon Brown. On 11 May 2010, David Cameron took delivery of the dark grey car No. 10 Jaguar XJ Sentinel as his prime ministerial car. In 2011, Cameron took the delivery of another XJ Sentinel featuring bomb proof doors, bullet proof glass, and armoured plating beneath the floor of the car, respectively replacing the previous XJ Sentinel. The car was used for transporting Theresa May, and was also used by Boris Johnson. Under Johnson, the XJ was replaced for the first time since 1979 by the Range Rover Abio Sentinel as the prime ministerial car in 2019.

== Model year changes ==
=== 2011 ===
New options include:

- New Rear Seat Comfort package, which incorporates electric recline, lumbar adjustment and massage functions to reinforce the ultimate executive limousine experience.
- Executive Pack option is added to XJL Portfolio model, which includes provision of fold-down laptop trays and an electric rear sunblind, upgraded carpeting, combination wood and leather steering wheel, gloss wood veneer choices and chrome mirror housings.
- Sport and Speed Pack option, which includes a new front splitter and rear spoiler, suede headliner, sport seats with contrasting stitching, bright metal pedals, either piano black or carbon-fiber interior trim, gloss black exterior trim, red brake calipers, and Venom 20-inch wheel design. The speed governor is relaxed from 250 km/h (155 mph) to 280 km/h (174 mph).
- Illumination Package (standard on Supersport model) is available as option of other XJ models.
- 3.0-litre petrol V6 engine for selected markets, launched in China.

==== XJ 5.0 V8 Portfolio Prestige ====
The XJ V8 Portfolio Prestige is a special model developed for the Hong Kong market. Based on the XJ L Portfolio with a 5.0-litre V8 engine, it includes the XJ rear seat comfort pack and gloss oak interior veneer as standard equipment.

==== XJ Ultimate ====
The XJ Ultimate is a special model introduced in 2011. Available only in the long wheelbase configuration, the car was developed by the Jaguar Land Rover's specialist Engineered To Order (ETO) division and was unveiled at the 2012 Beijing Auto Show. Mechanical equipment for the US model includes a 5.0 L supercharged V8 engine rated at 510 PS (375 kW) and an eight-speed automatic transmission. The XJ went on sale in late 2012 as the 2013 model year vehicle. In India, the XJ Ultimate is available with a 5.0-litre V8 petrol engine that costs ₹18.8 million (US$200,000) or with a 3.0-litre V6 turbocharged diesel engine that costs ₹17.8 million (US$190,000).

=== 2012 ===
Changes include:

- Introduction of a 3.0-litre supercharged V6 engine
- Eight-speed automatic transmission for all models.
- Jaguar's Intelligent Stop/Start system extended to all V6 and V8 petrol and all diesel engines.
- The supercharged V8 petrol engine has fuel economy gains of up to 11% with emissions reductions of more than 8%, while the naturally aspirated V8 sees economy improvements of up to 8% with emissions down by more than 6%.
- Optional sound systems developed by British ultra-premium specialist Meridian. Available in two power outputs — 380 W and 825 W — both featuring multiple channel amplifiers and digital signal processing software powering an array of loudspeakers.
- Infotainment system updates enhance the audio and navigation interfaces and usability.
- Suspension enhancements to the XJ further optimise passenger comfort.

==== XJR (2013–2019) ====
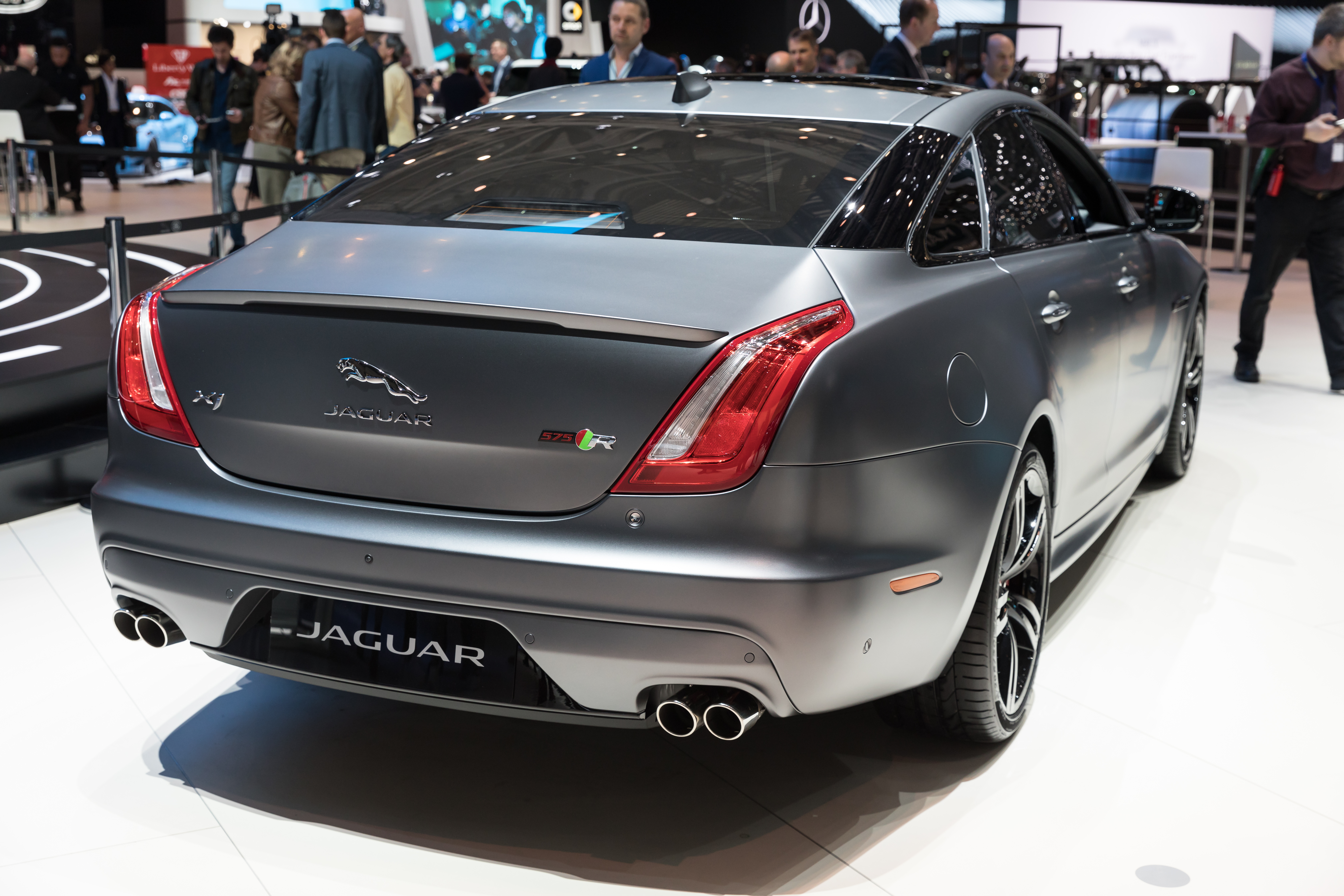
Rear view of the XJR575 in 2018

Introduced in 2013, the XJR is a high-performance variant of the XJ. Available in standard and long wheelbase configurations, it includes a 5.0-litre supercharged V8 engine rated at 550 PS (405 kW; 542 hp) and 680 N⋅m (502 lb⋅ft), an increased top speed to 280 km/h (174 mph), eight-speed automatic transmission with a bespoke tuning for the XJR, a new front splitter and aerodynamic sill section combined with an additional rear spoiler and unique R bonnet louvres, Electronic Active Differential and Dynamic Stability Control systems calibrated to enhance handling characteristics, new 20-inch Farallon forged alloy wheels with bespoke Pirelli low-profile tyres, semi-aniline leather, a choice of veneers, and contrasting stitching on the seats.

The XJR was initially unveiled at 2013 New York Auto Show, followed by the 2013 Goodwood Festival of Speed. The US model went on sale as 2014 model year vehicle.

==== Transmissions ====
All models include ZF 8HP eight-speed automatic transmission.

=== 2014 ===
Changes include optional Intelligent All-Wheel Drive System for 3.0-litre V6 petrol engine models, addition of long-wheelbase models, power output of the XJR model increased to 550 PS (405 kW), Intelligent Stop/Start system for all engines and increased headroom for long-wheelbase models (except US model).

=== 2016 ===
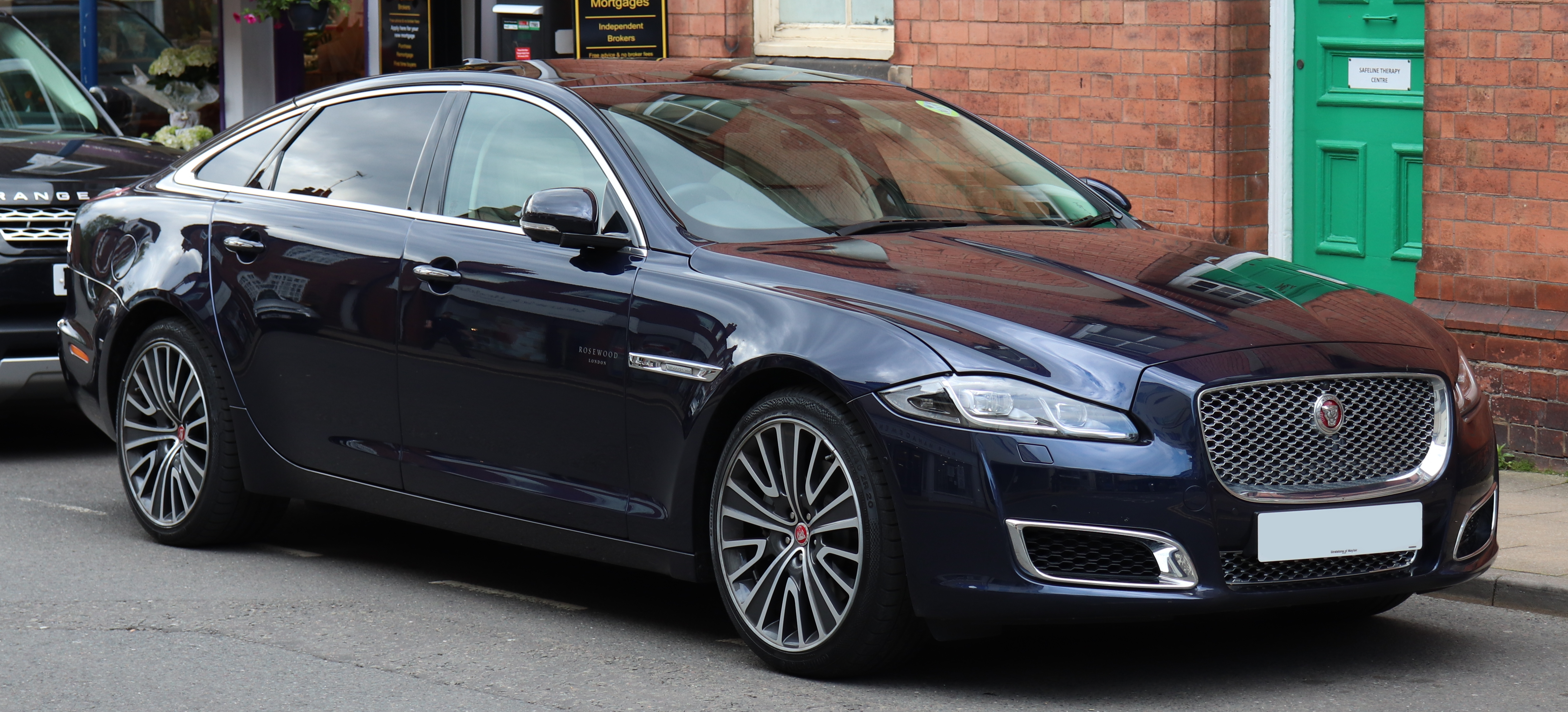

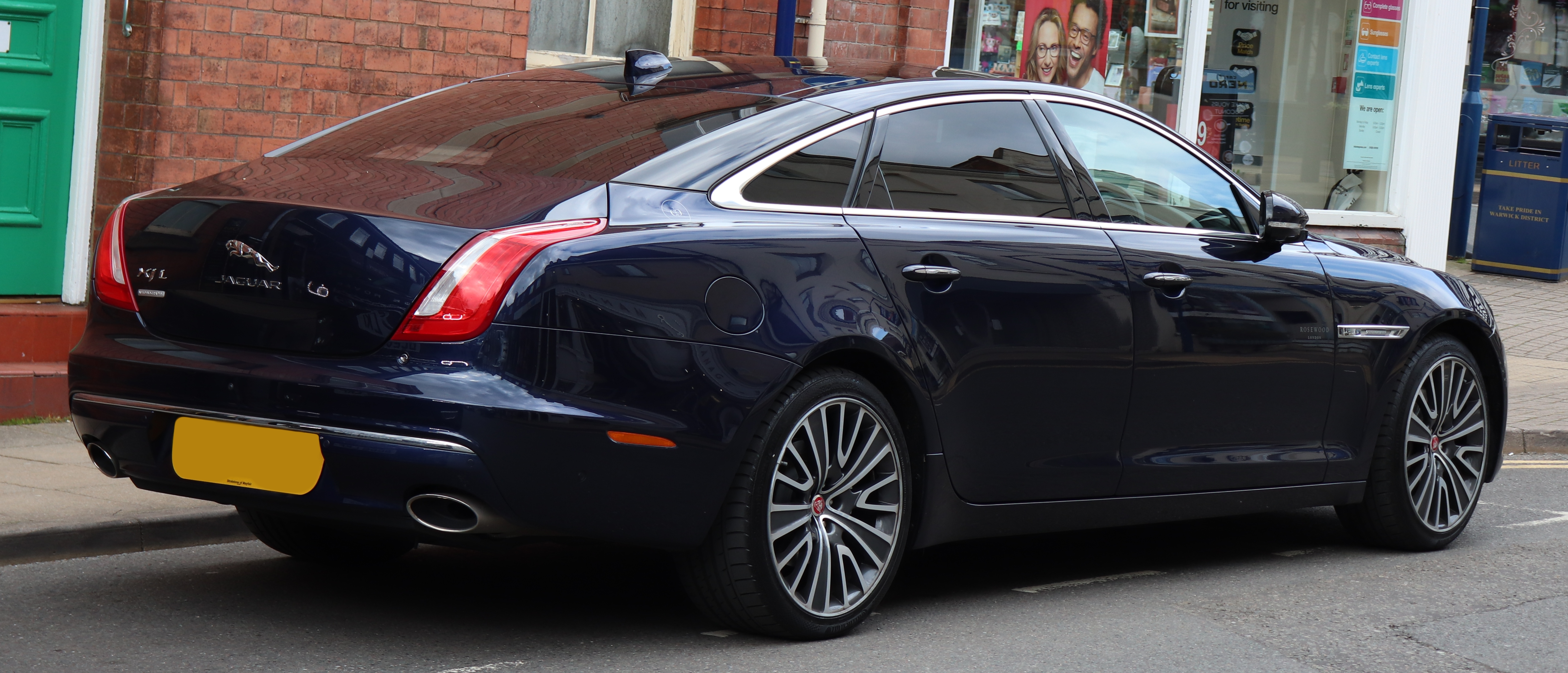
The 2016 facelifted XJL Autobiography

The XJ received a facelift for MY2016. Changes include LED front and rear lights, rear J-Blade lights, a new grille, and a new InControl Touch Pro infotainment system, new driver assistance technology and a new audio system.

=== 2017–2019 ===
Models 2017-2019 received an upgraded 10" infotainment LCD, up from 7" LCD that was offered on all previous models.

== Discontinuation ==
On 30 May 2019, Autocar reported that Jaguar would discontinue the X351 in July 2019, partly to make way for a new flagship XJ electric car planned to be built at Castle Bromwich. The article mentioned that, despite its status, it was Jaguar's least popular model, selling 301 in September 2018 compared with 4,492 Jaguar F-Pace SUVs and 2,252 Jaguar XE saloons.

In February 2021, it was announced that the electric XJ successor was cancelled for the present. The company said: "Following a thorough technology review against the exponential change in the automotive industry, we concluded that the planned XJ replacement does not fit with our vision for a reimaged Jaguar brand." As reported by Richard Porter of Sniff Petrol in August 2022, the prototypes of the cancelled successor still existed and were SORN, and subsequently found out other prototypes existed and were still being tested on the road.

In a September 2022 retrospective, James Howe wrote: "Fans of the XJ may regard the X351 as too far removed from the familiar flowing lines of its seven predecessors, but even 12 years after it was launched at the Saatchi Gallery in London, and two years since production ceased, it still looks modern and unmistakably Jaguar."
