= Jaguar Land Rover car platforms =

Underpinnings of vehicles

The Jaguar Land Rover car platforms are the major structures, designed by Jaguar Land Rover (JLR), which underpin their Jaguar and Land Rover cars.

== Current platforms ==
The following platforms are used by JLR in its current car ranges.

=== D7 ===
The D7 platform was developed as the Premium Lightweight Architecture (PLA) aluminium platform for larger vehicles. There are four variants of the D7: the D7a (also known as the iQ[Al]) used by the Jaguar XE (X760), Jaguar XF (X260), Jaguar F-Pace (X761) and Land Rover Range Rover Velar (L560); the D7e for the Jaguar I-Pace, the D7u used by the Land Rover Discovery (L462), Land Rover Range Rover Sport (L494) and Land Rover Range Rover (L405) and the D7x developed for the 2020 Land Rover Defender (L663).

In September 2026, the Defender Wolf Series II was launched, based on D7x platform, and will compete for the UK Ministry of Defence Light Mobility Vehicle tender.

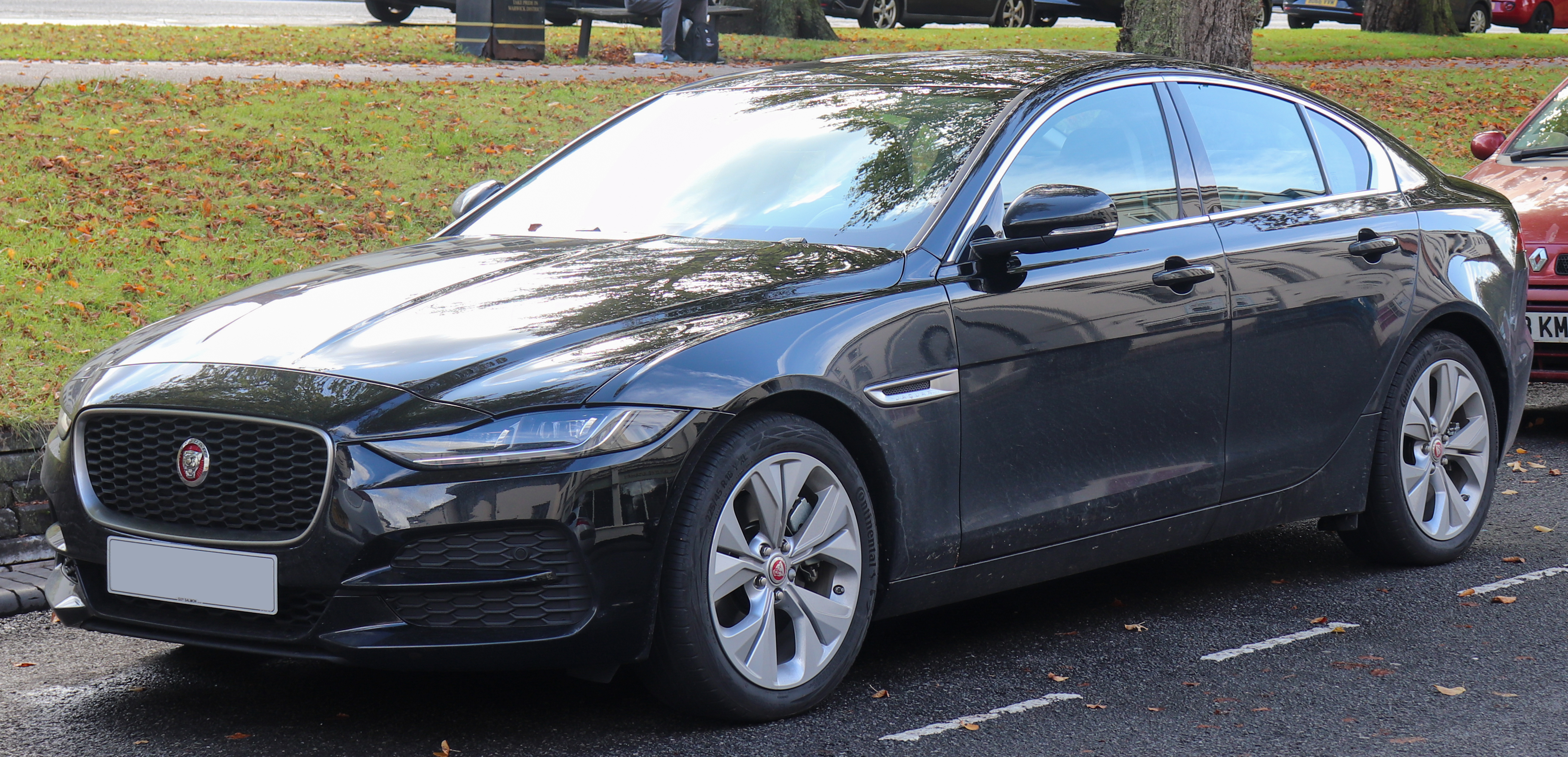
Jaguar XE (X760)

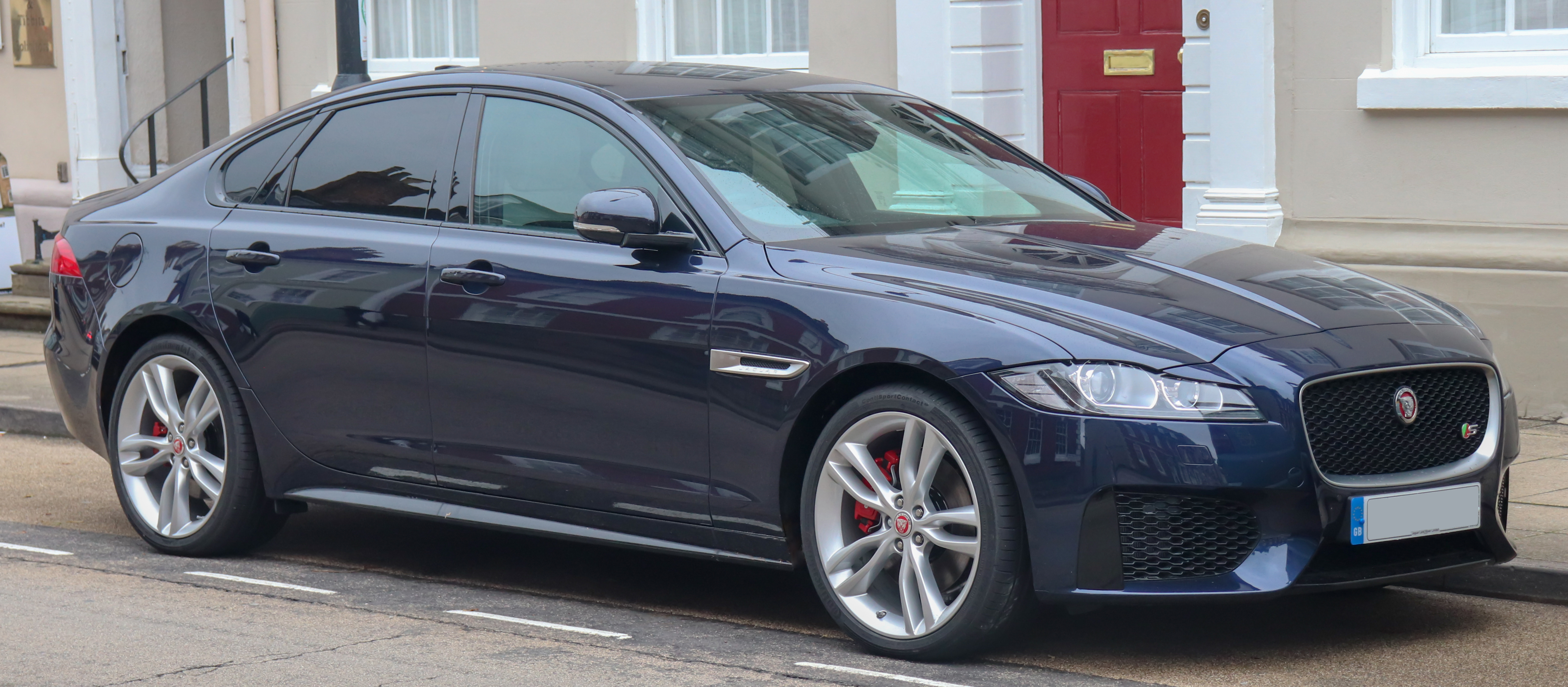
Jaguar XF (X260)

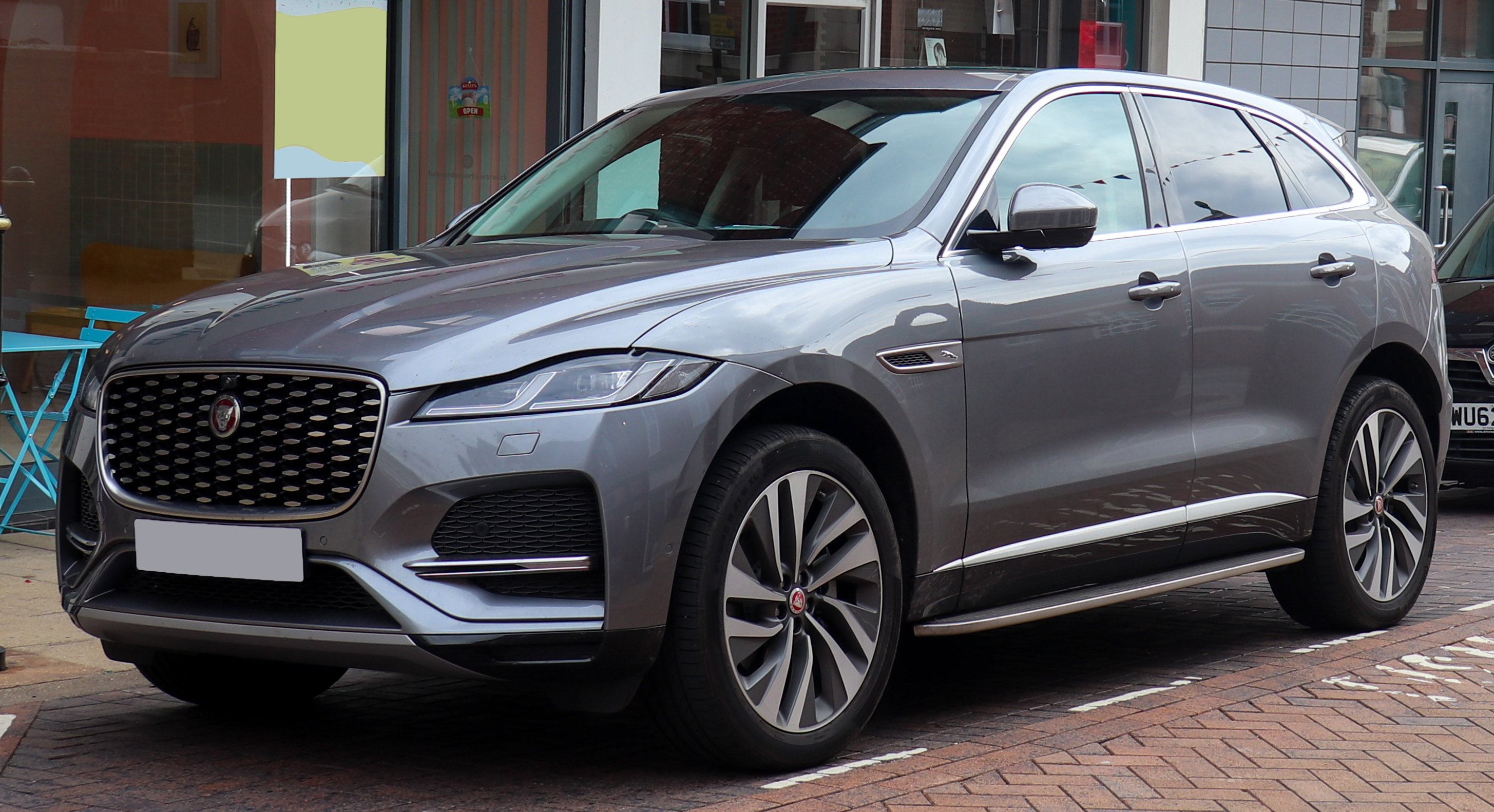
Jaguar F-Pace (X761)

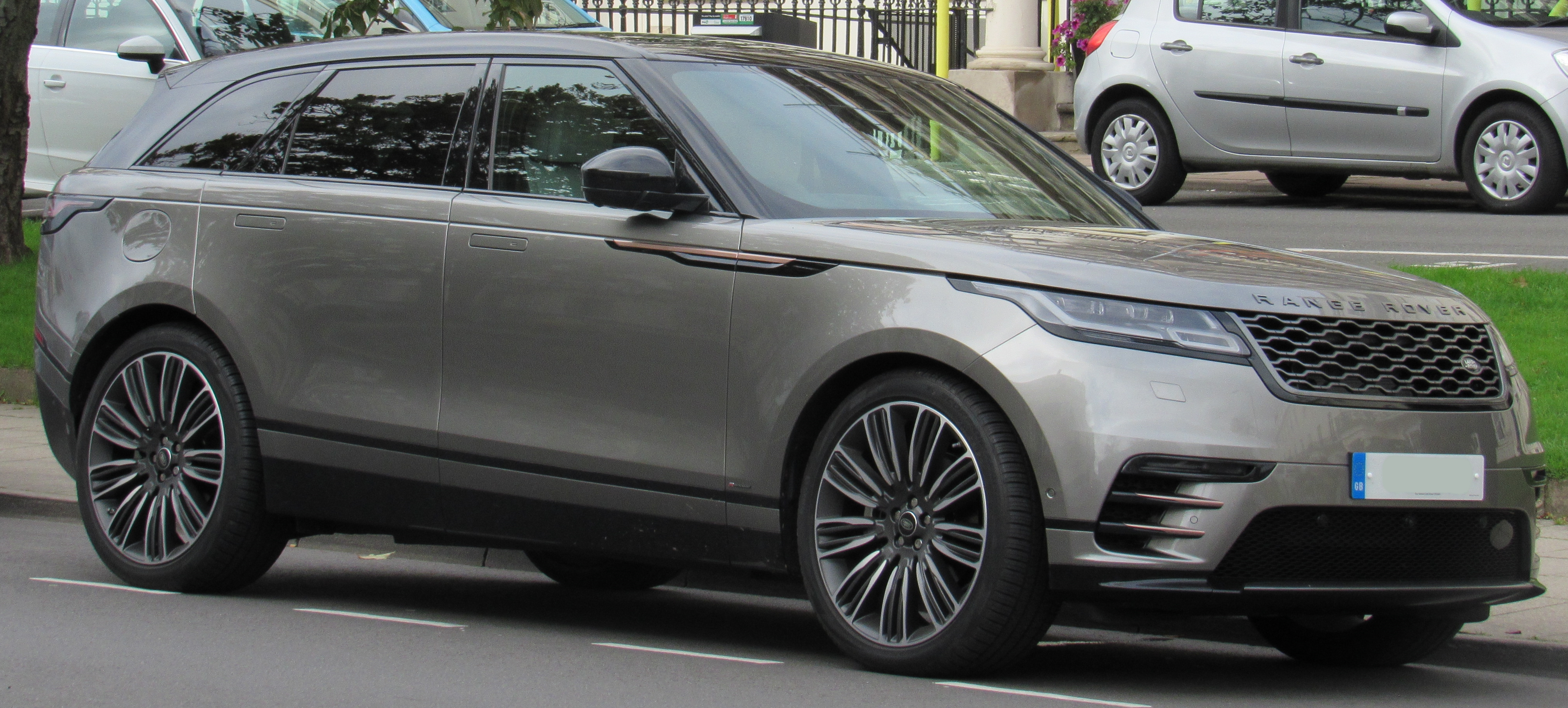
Land Rover Range Rover Velar (L560)

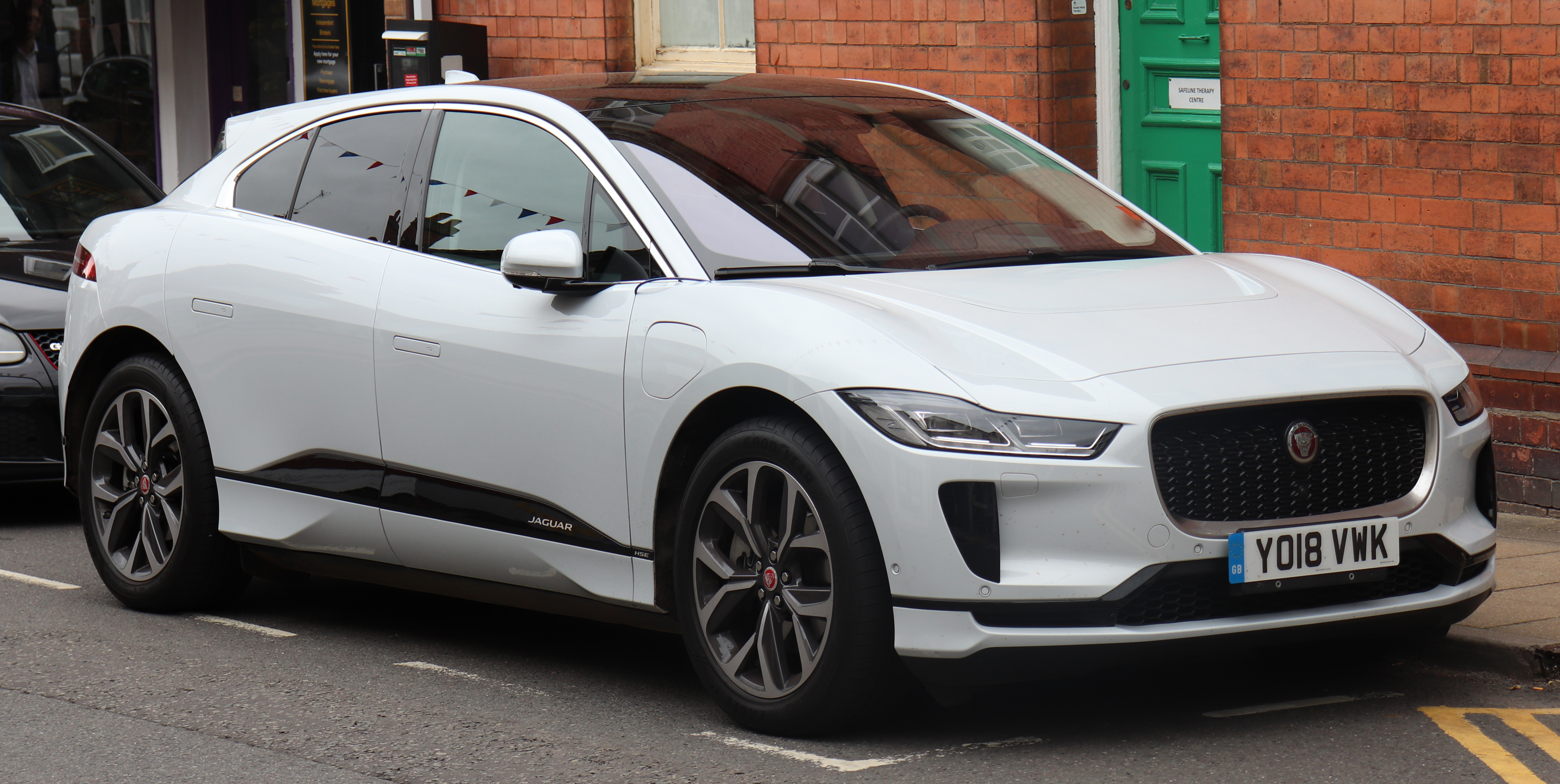
Jaguar I-Pace

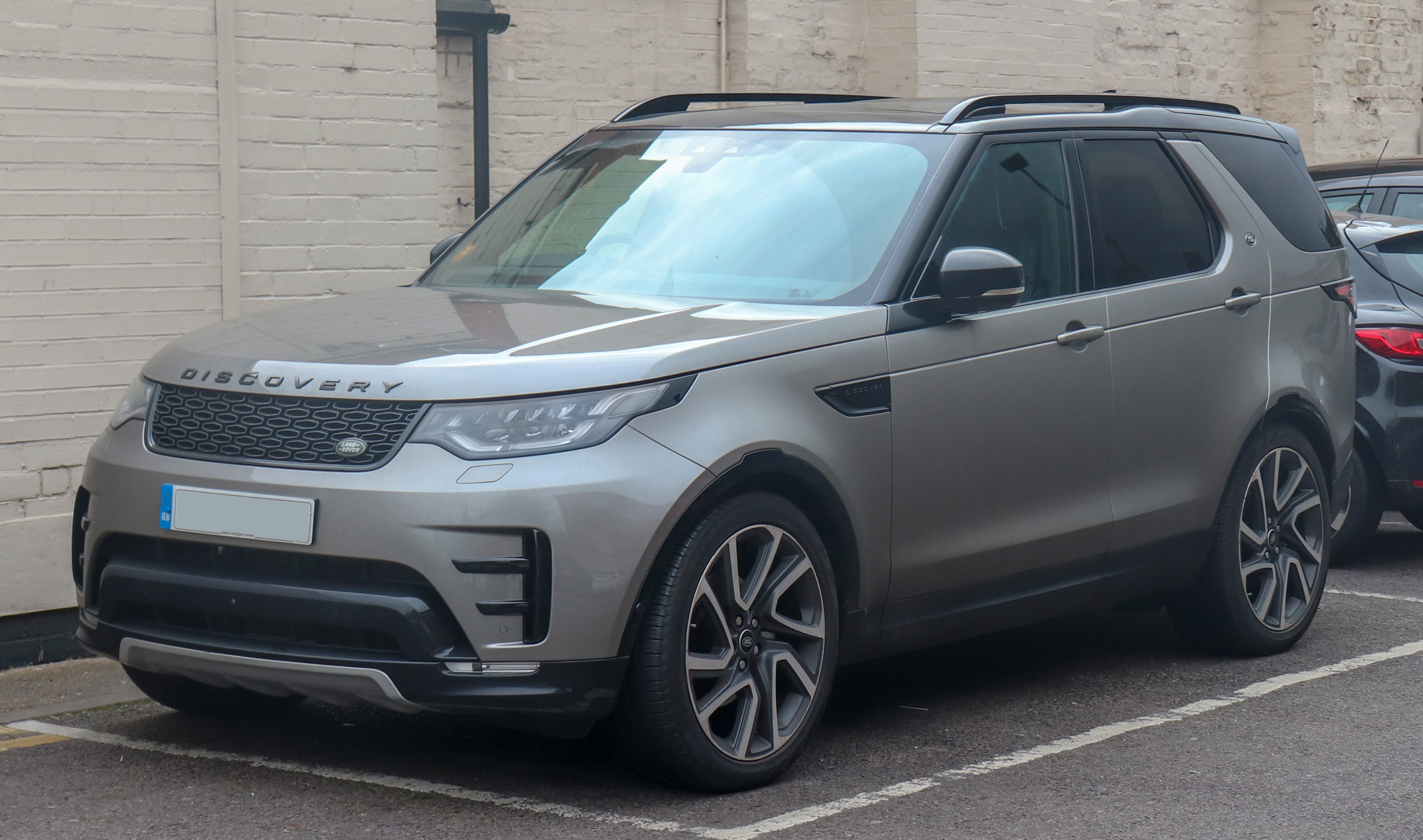
Land Rover Discovery (L462)

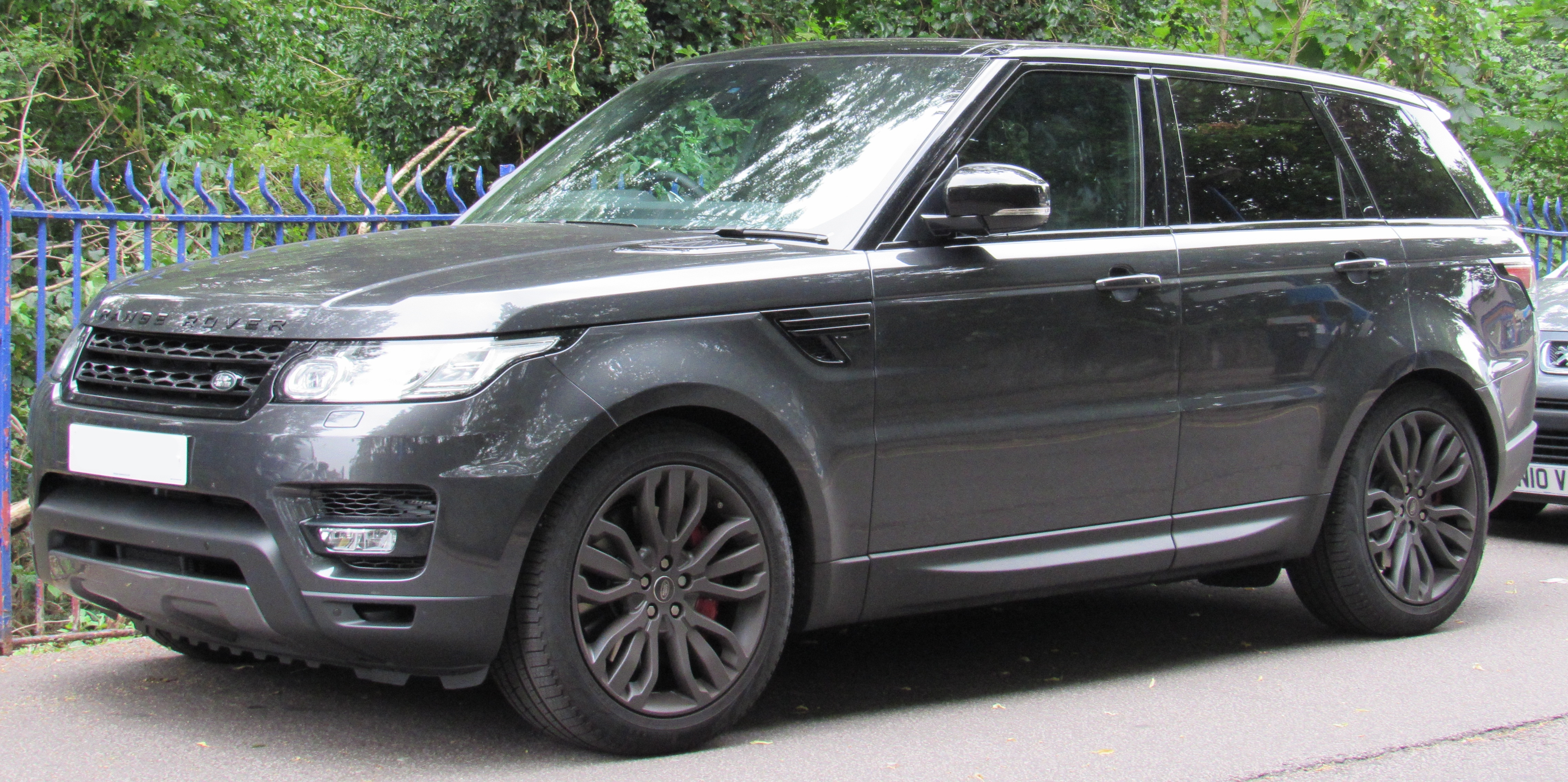
Land Rover Range Rover Sport (L494)

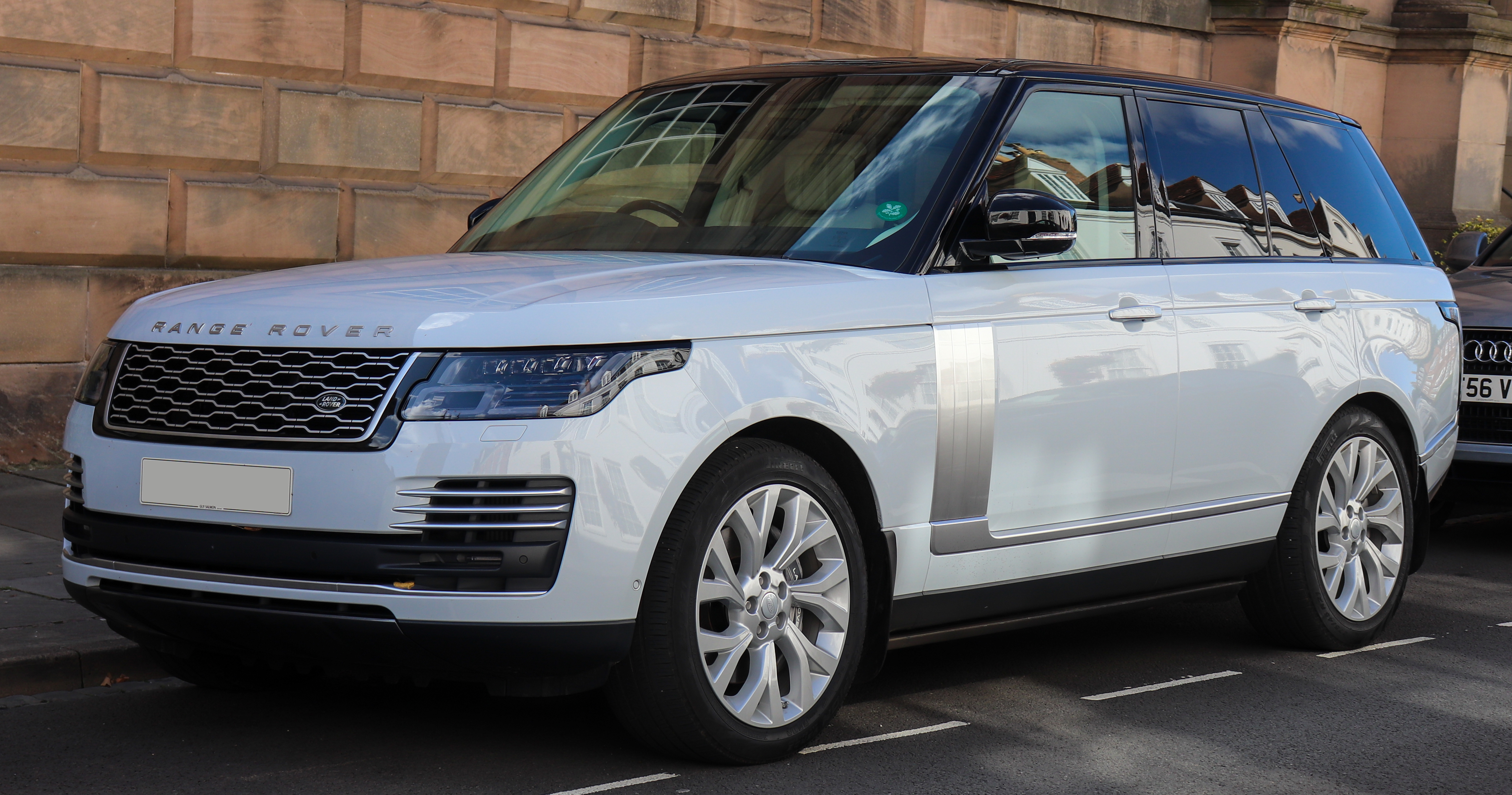
Land Rover Range Rover (L405)

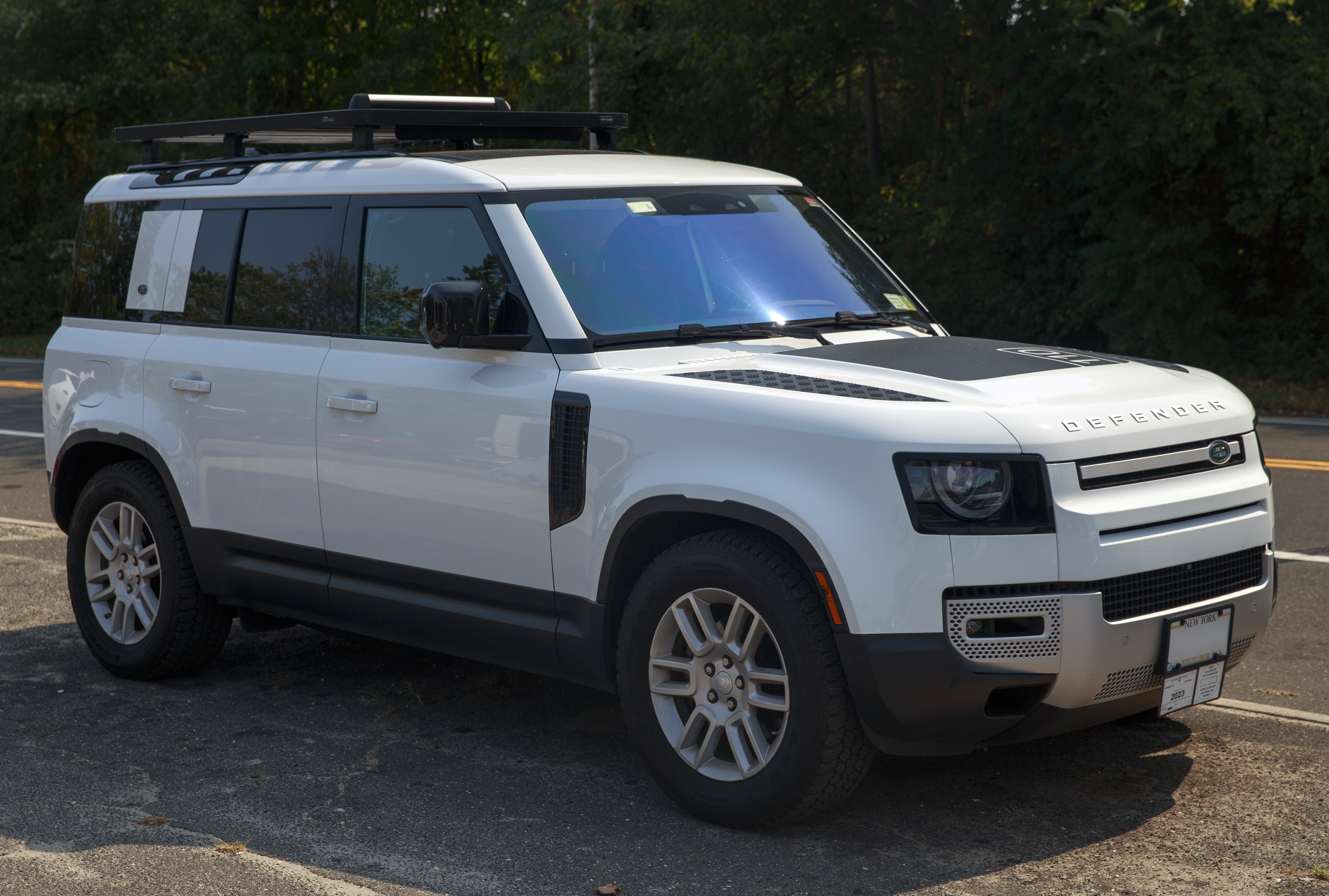
Land Rover Defender (L663)

=== D8 ===
The D8 (also known as the LR-MS) steel platform is a modified Ford EUCD platform, inherited when Land Rover was a subsidiary of Ford. It is used for the Land Rover Range Rover Evoque (L538), Land Rover Discovery Sport, Tata Harrier, and Tata Safari.

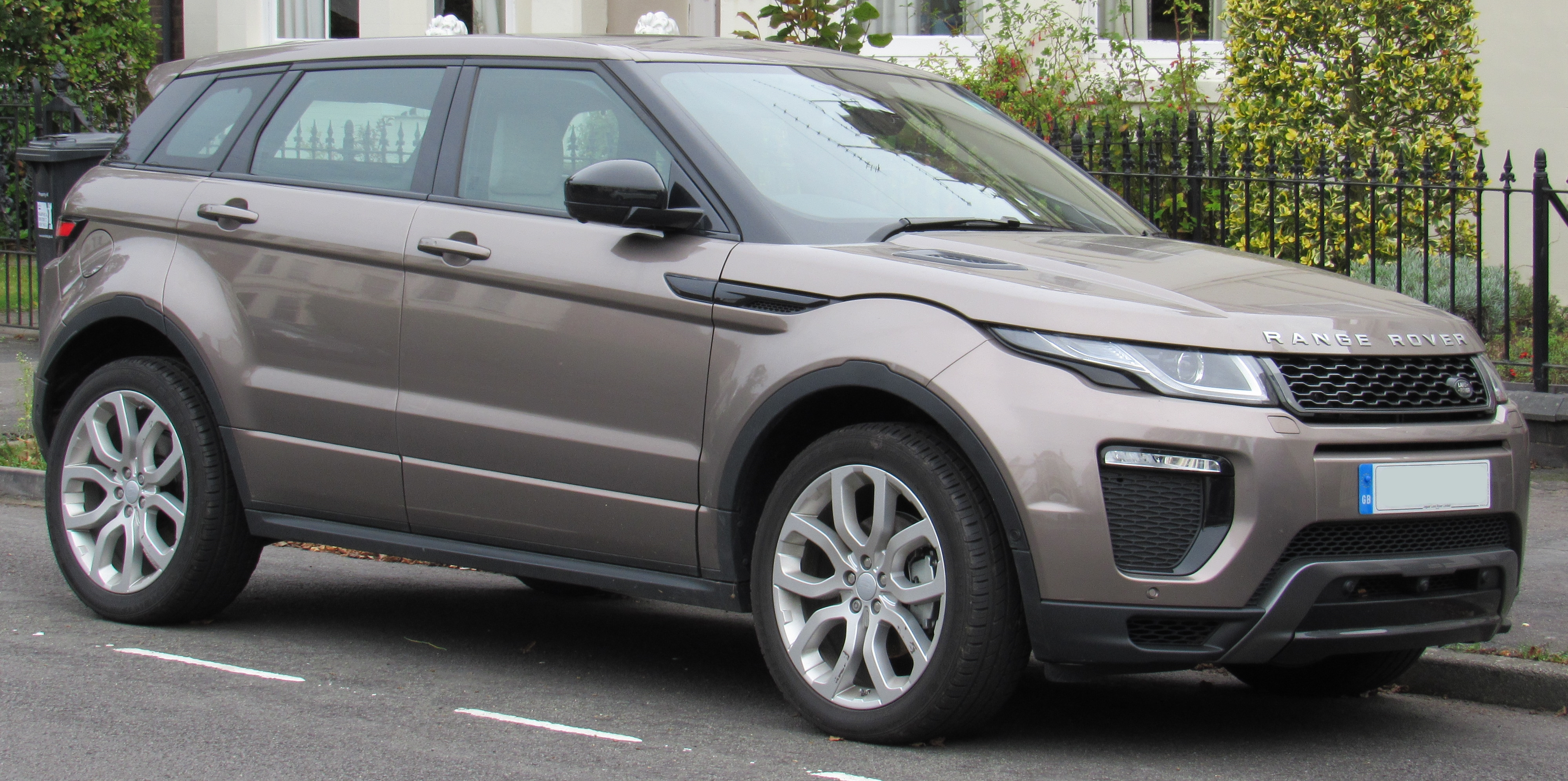
Land Rover Range Rover Evoque (L538)

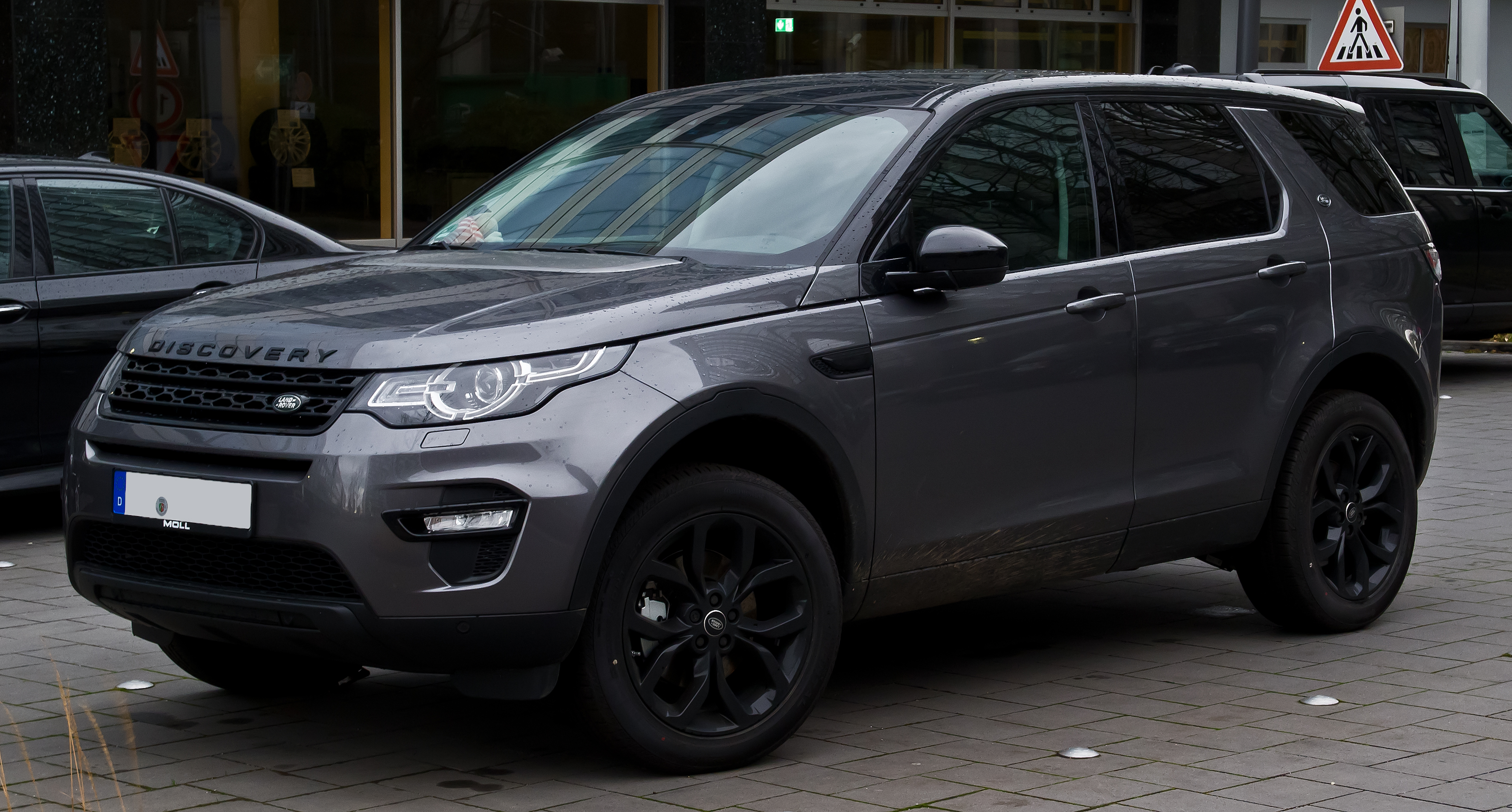
Land Rover Discovery Sport

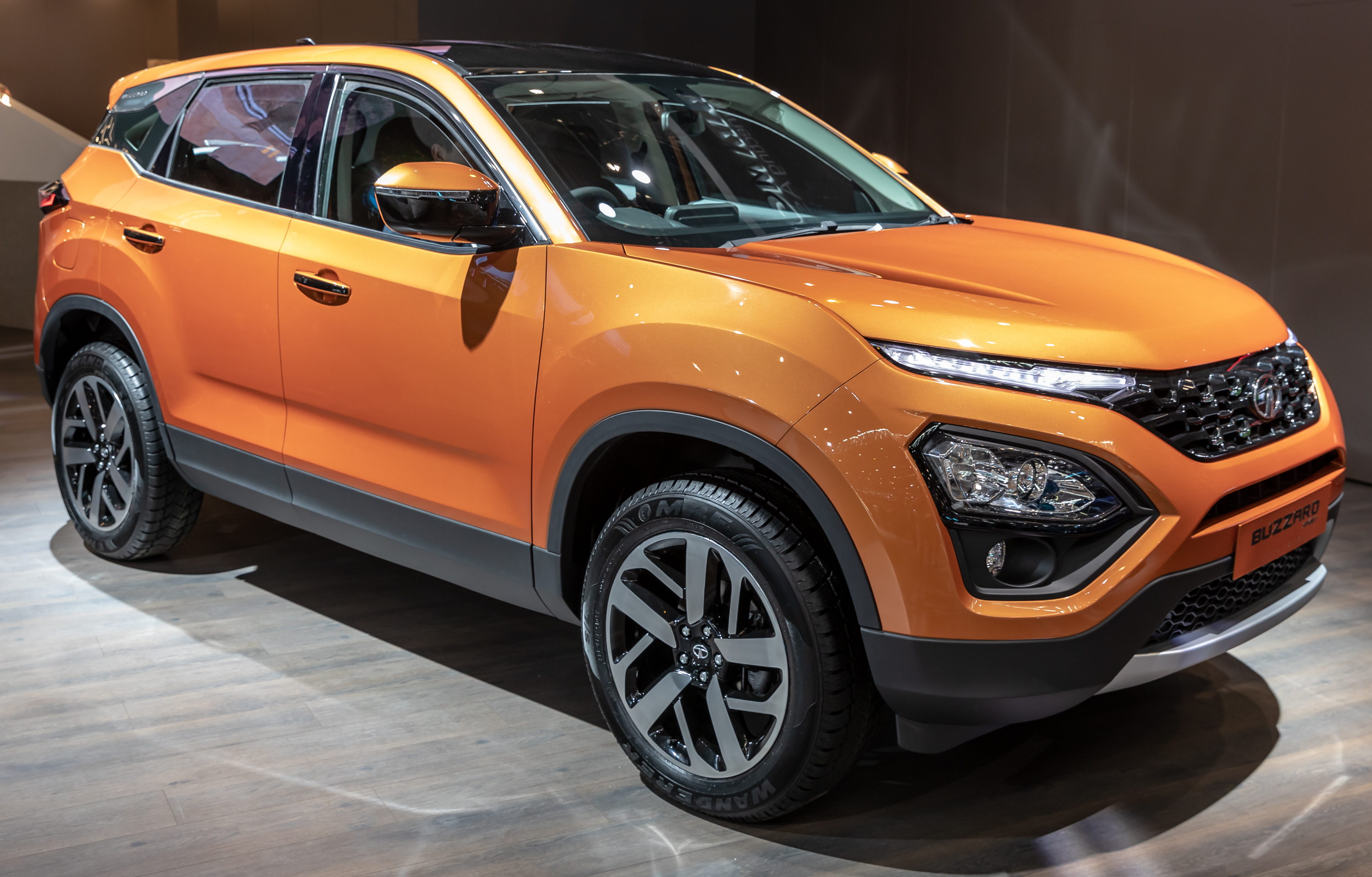
Tata Harrier

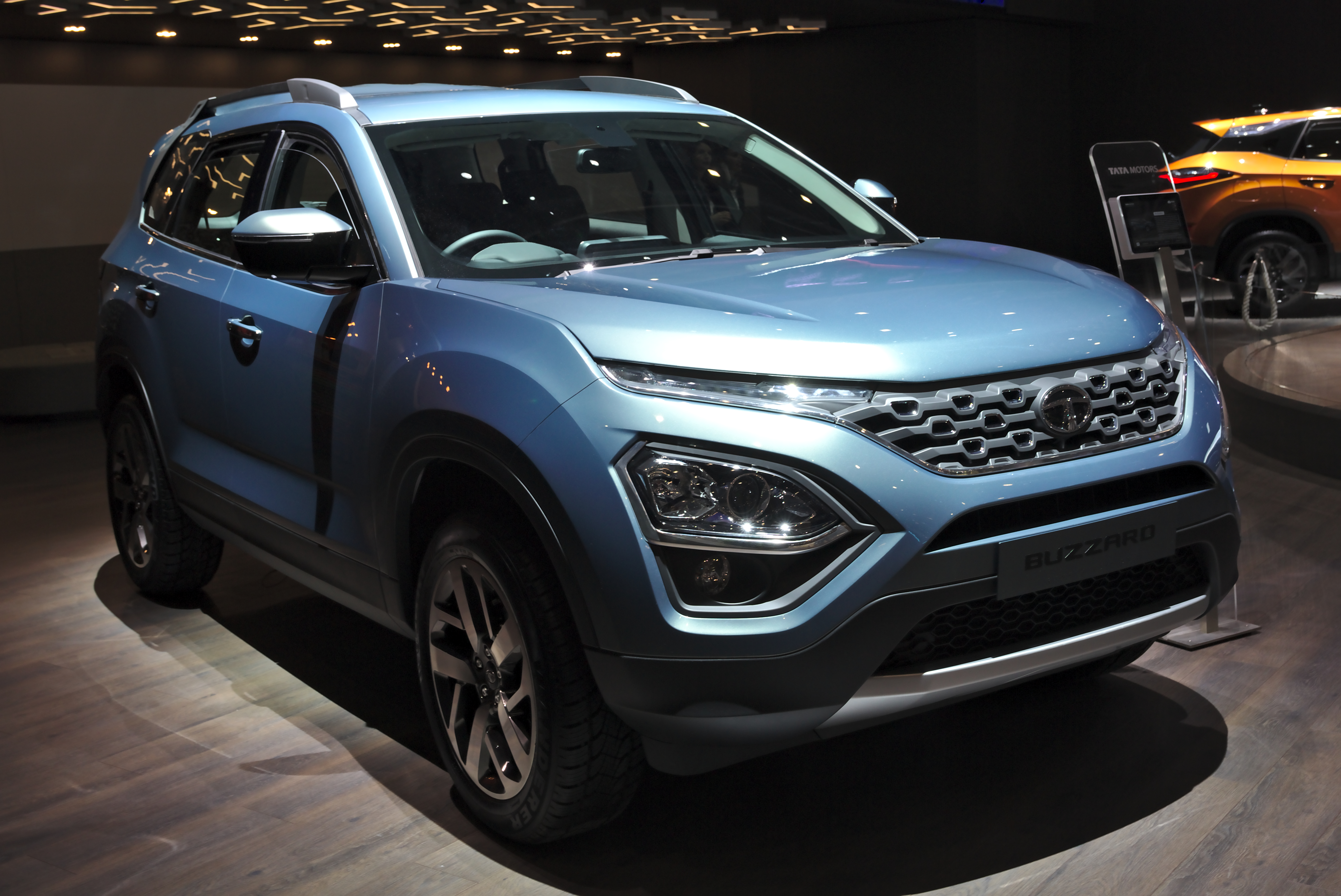
Tata Safari

=== PTA ===
The PTA (Premium Transverse Architecture) is a rebrand of the D8 platform which can be used for mild-hybrid, electrified and ICE powertrains. It was first used on the Jaguar E-Pace and then on the second generation Range Rover Evoque and facelifted Land Rover Discovery Sport.

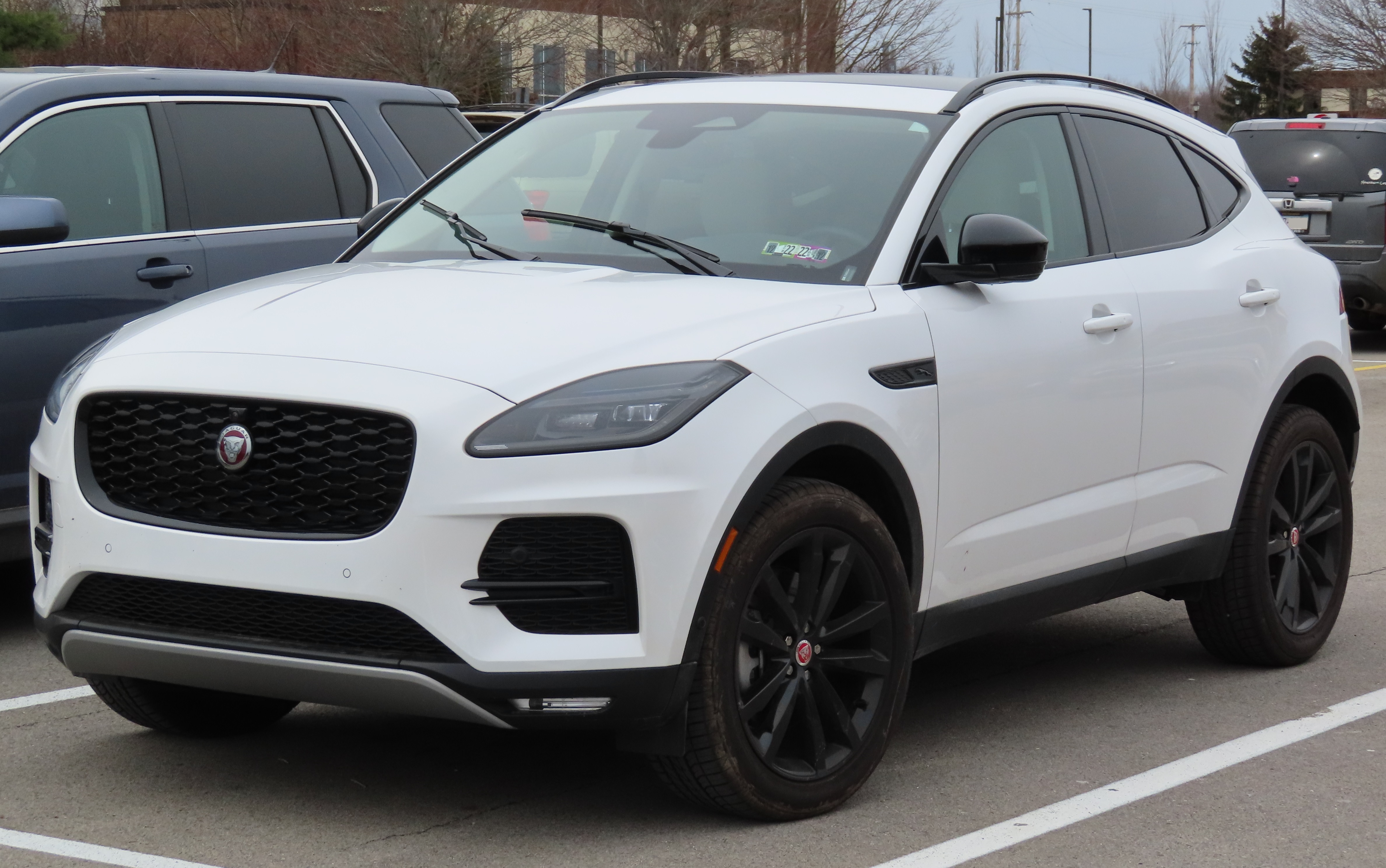
Jaguar E-Pace

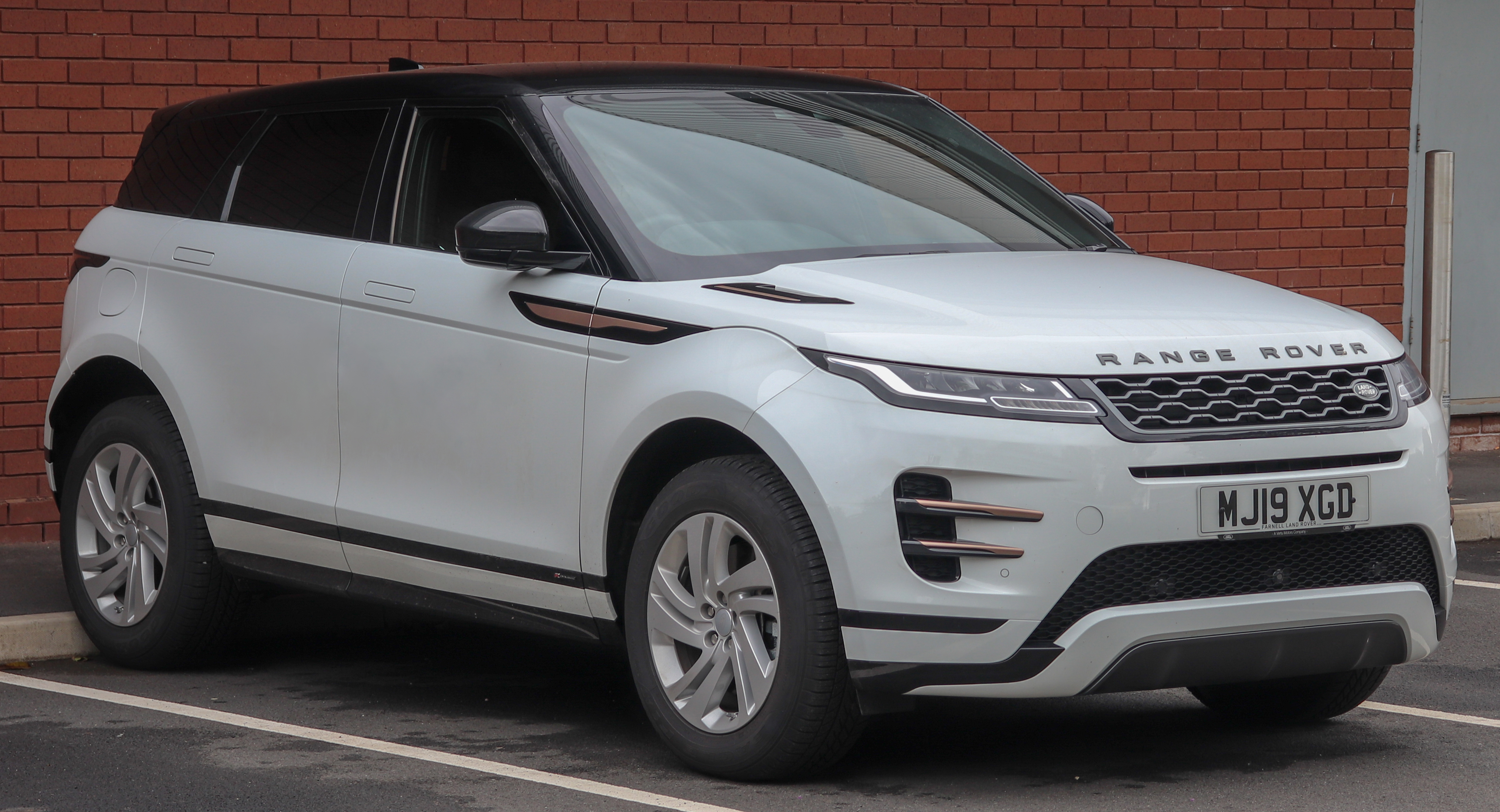
Land Rover Range Rover Evoque (L551)

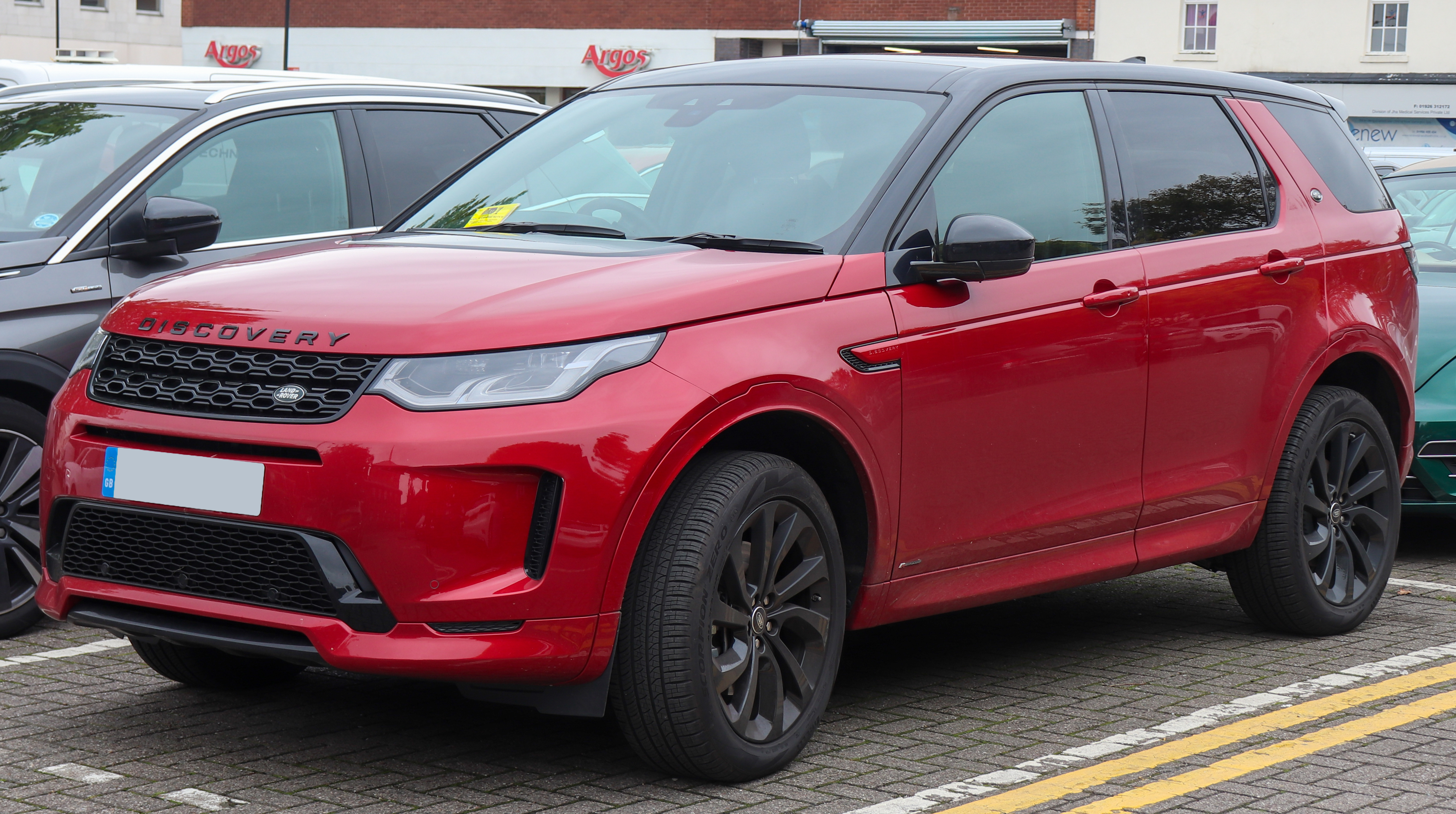
Facelifted Land Rover Discovery Sport

=== MLA ===
The MLA (Modular Longitudinal Architecture) is an electric platform designed to be used for all-electric drive, plug-in hybrid and mild hybrid vehicles. On 5 July 2019, JLR announced that the upcoming electric Jaguar XJ was to be manufactured on this platform at Castle Bromwich site after retooling of the plant. The Jaguar J-Pace large SUV was also planned to use the MLA platform, along with a Land Rover model. However, the XJ and J-Pace were cancelled in February 2021. On 26 October 2021, JLR revealed the fifth generation Range Rover which uses the MLA-Flex platform. The third generation Range Rover Sport was revealed on 11 May 2022.

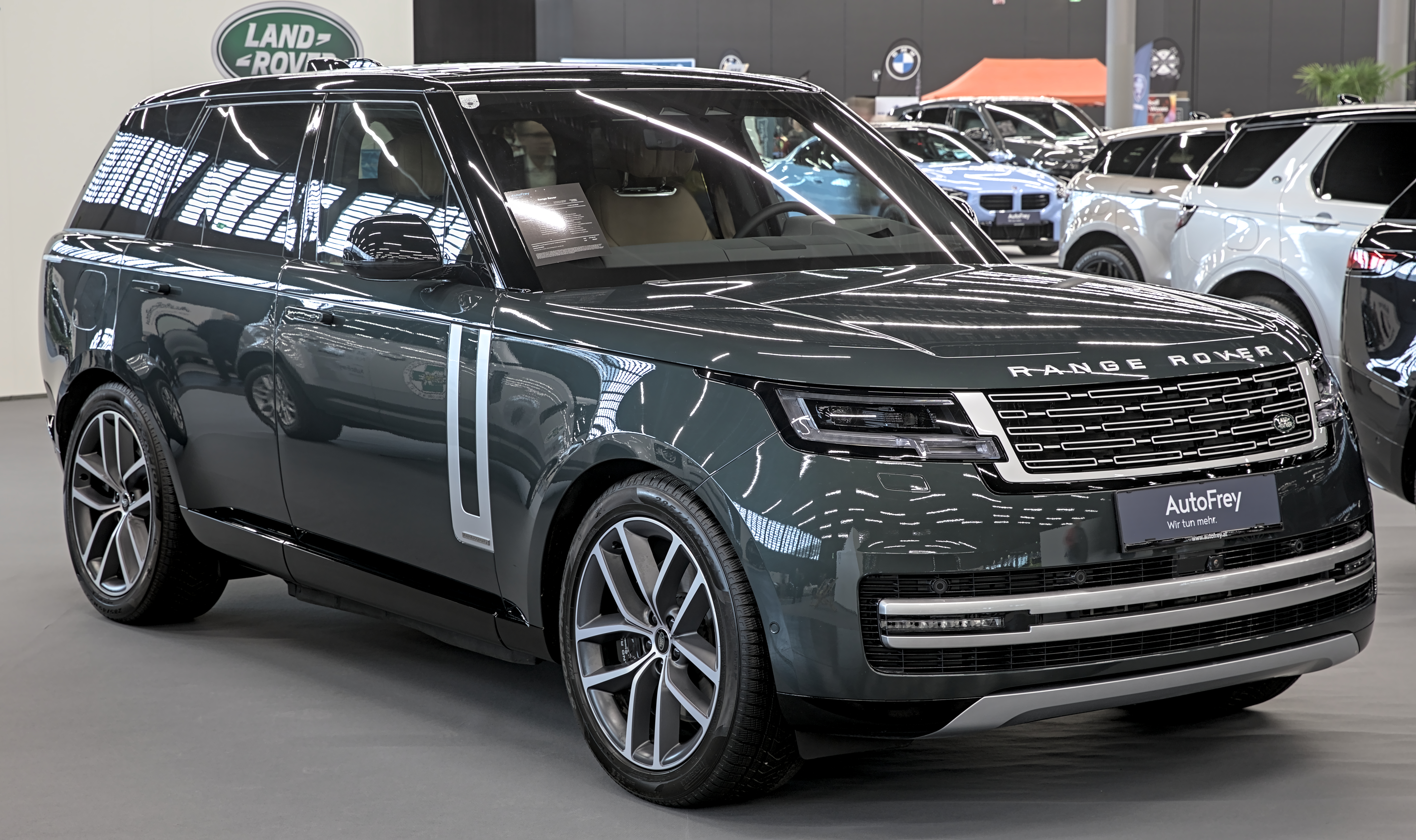
Land Rover Range Rover (L460)

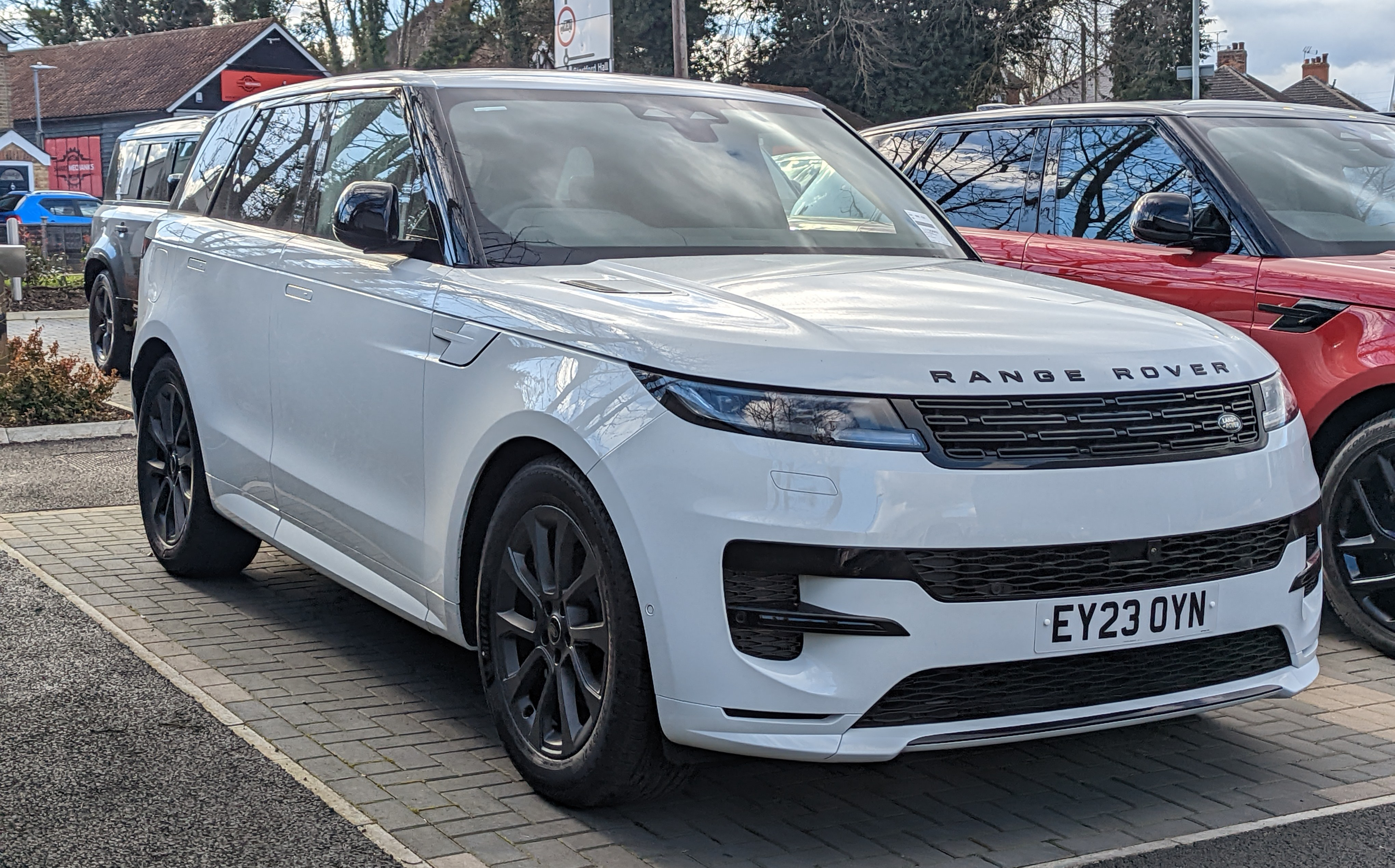
Land Rover Range Rover Sport (L461)

=== Summary table ===
Current platforms and vehicles
Platform	Marque	Engine orientation	Model
D7a	Jaguar	Longitudinal	XE (X760)
D7a	Jaguar	Longitudinal	XF (X260)
D7a	Jaguar	Longitudinal	F-Pace (X761)
D7a	Land Rover	Longitudinal	Range Rover Velar (L560)
D7u	Land Rover	Longitudinal	Discovery (L462)
D7u	Land Rover	Longitudinal	Range Rover (L405)
D7u	Land Rover	Longitudinal	Range Rover Sport (L494)
D7u	Land Rover	Longitudinal	Land Rover Defender (L663)
D8	Land Rover	Transverse	Discovery Sport 1 (L550)
D8	Land Rover	Transverse	Range Rover Evoque 1 (L538)
D8	Tata	Transverse	Safari
D8	Tata	Transverse	Harrier/Buzzard Sport
PTA	Jaguar	Transverse	E-Pace (X540)
PTA	Land Rover	Transverse	Discovery Sport 2 (L550)
PTA	Land Rover	Transverse	Range Rover Evoque 2 (L551)
MLA-Flex	Land Rover	Longitudinal	Range Rover (L460)
MLA-Flex	Land Rover	Longitudinal	Range Rover Sport (L461)

== Past platforms ==
=== D2a ===
The D2a was the aluminium alloy platform used on the Jaguar XJ (X351).

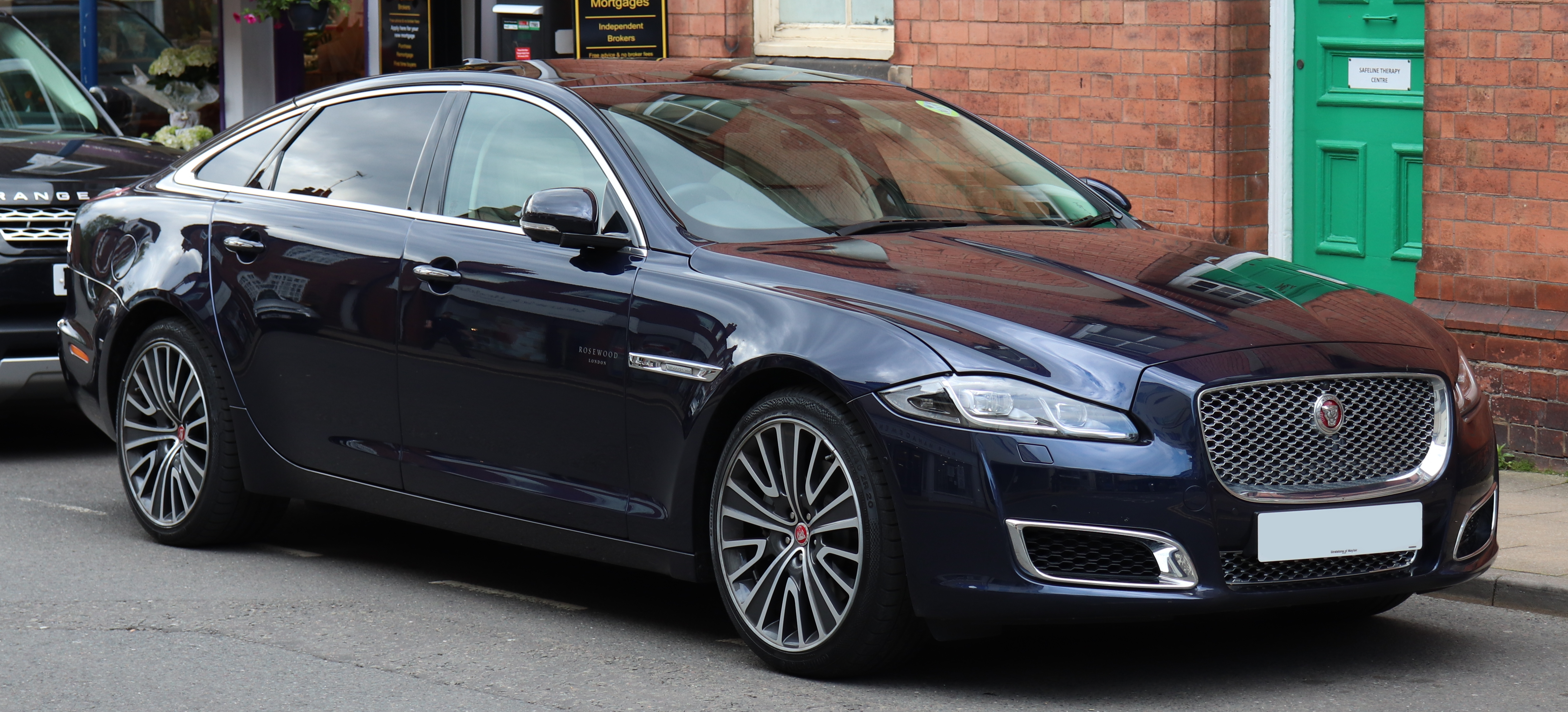
Jaguar XJL

=== D6a ===
The D6a was an all-aluminium platform developed from the XK platform for use on the Jaguar F-Type. David Brown Automotive also uses the platform for their Speedback Aston Martin DB series-inspired sports car.

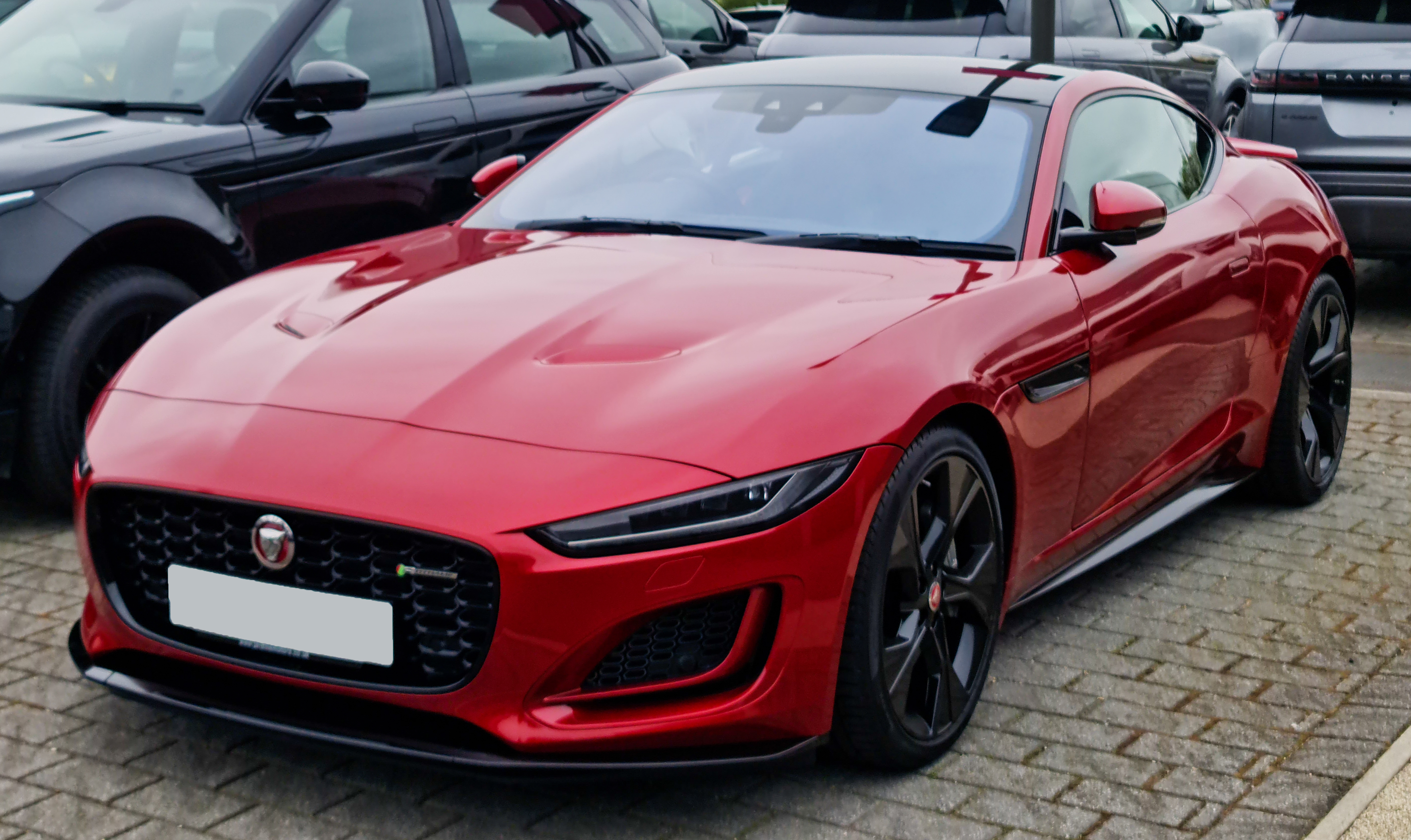
Jaguar F-Type Coupe

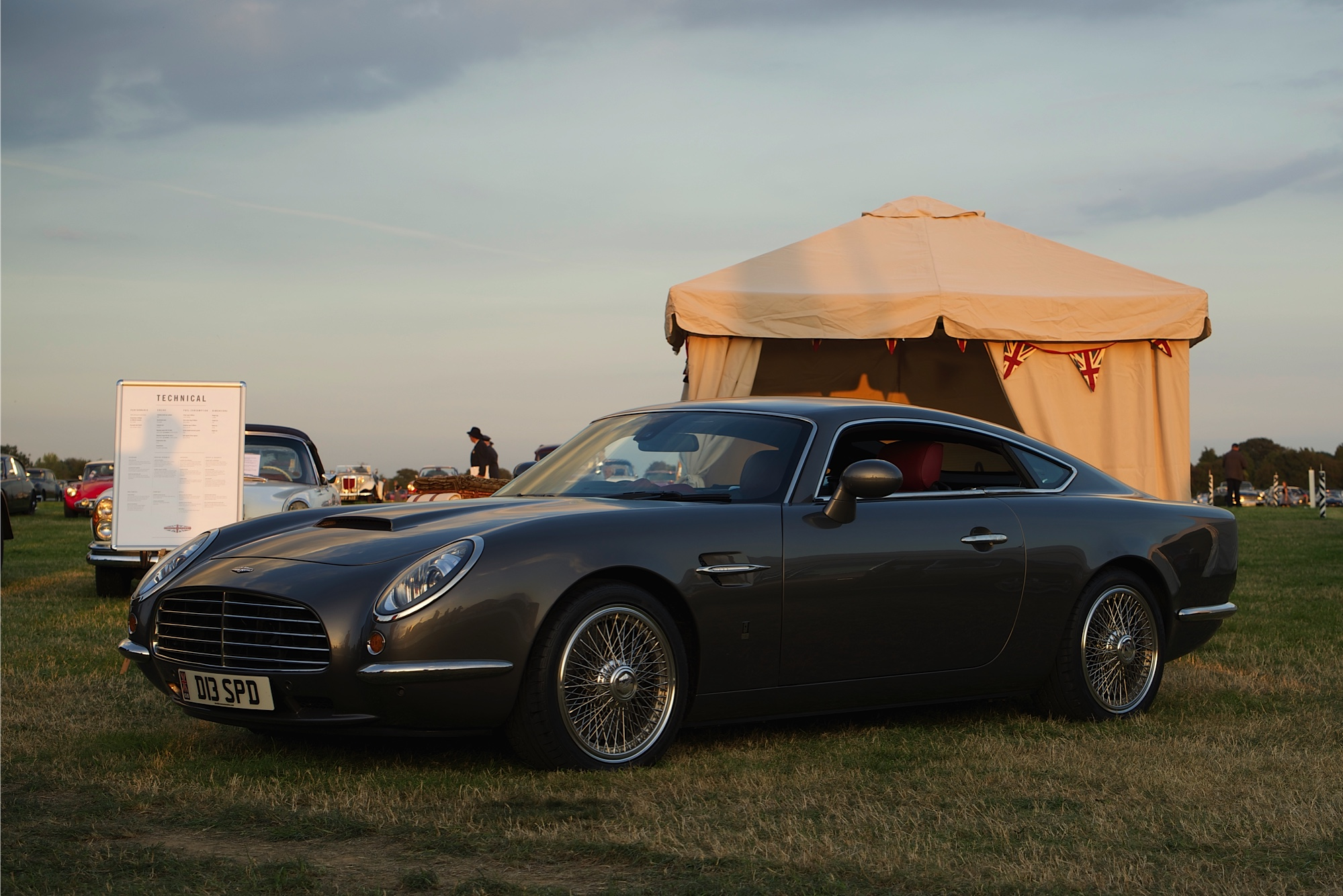
David Brown Speedback

=== D7e ===
The D7e was the platform used on the Jaguar I-Pace (X590).

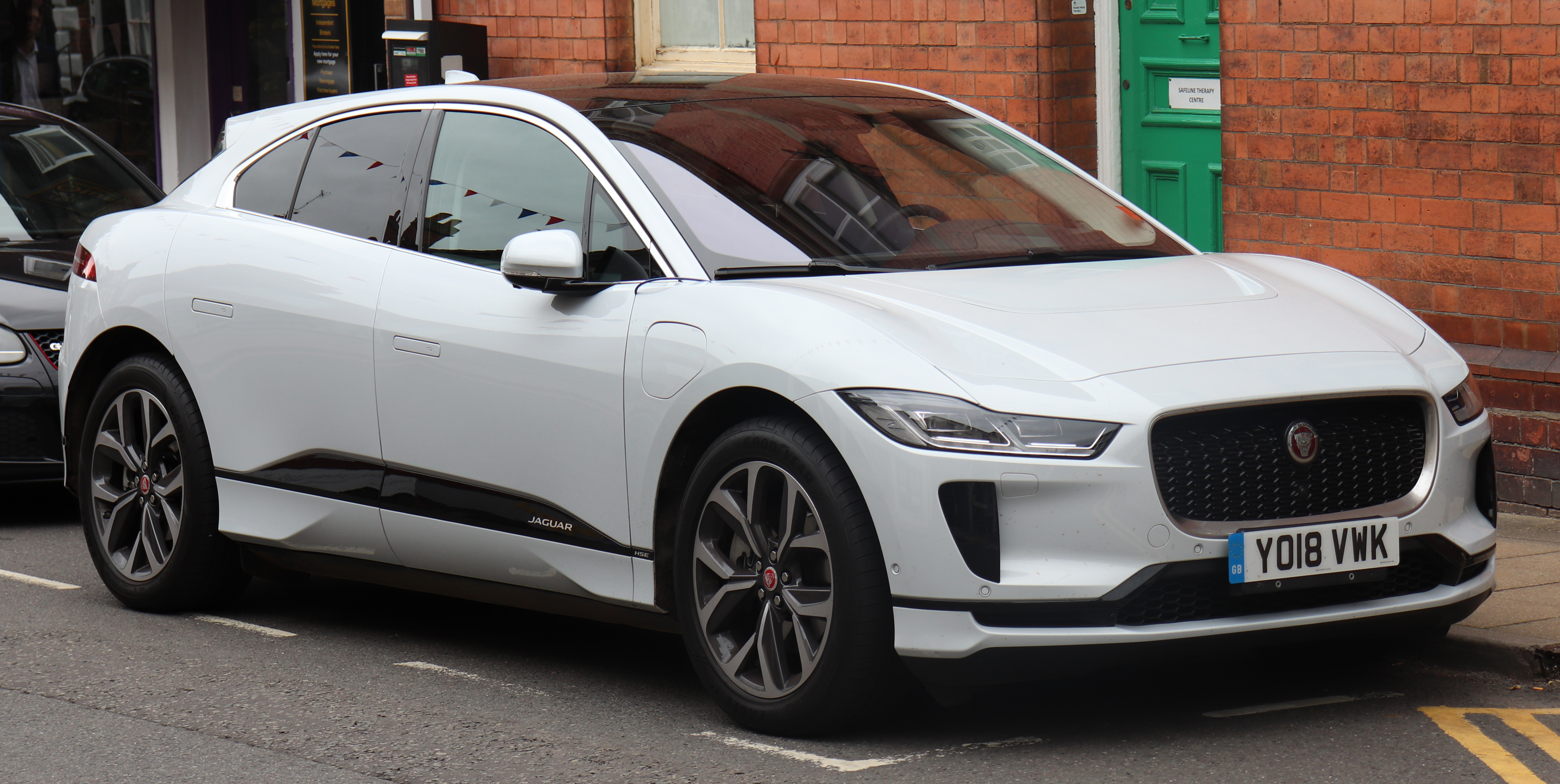
Jaguar I-Pace
