= Government Car Service =

United Kingdom government agency

Logo of the predecessor Government Car & Despatch Agency.

The Government Car Service (GCS) is a British organisation within the Cabinet Office that provides a high-quality, secure car service for Ministers of HM Government.

GCS was formerly part of the Government Car and Despatch Agency (GCDA). This was an executive agency of the Department for Transport, responsible for providing logistics services to the United Kingdom government and wider public sector.

== History ==
The Government Car and Despatch Agency (GCDA) was formed in 1997, when Security Facilities Executive was reformed.

The GCDA closed on Sunday 30 September 2012 following discontinuation of its despatch services earlier in the year. All government car services were closed as of that date, with the exception of secure transport for ministers, the Leader of the Opposition, former prime ministers and other senior officials, which transferred to the Department for Transport together with the supporting workshop services.

GCDA was split into two businesses: Government Car Service (GCS) and Government Mail. The GCS provided secure cars and drivers to government ministers and ran other people-movement services for the wider public sector. Government Mail (formerly known as the Interdespatch Service) provided inter-departmental mail and package movements, and a secure courier service for the wider public sector.

In July 2024, the GCS transferred to the Cabinet Office.

== Operations ==
The GCS is responsible for the Prime Ministerial Car, which is stored and maintained at 10 Downing Street, and staffed by the Metropolitan Police.
