= Jaguar XF =

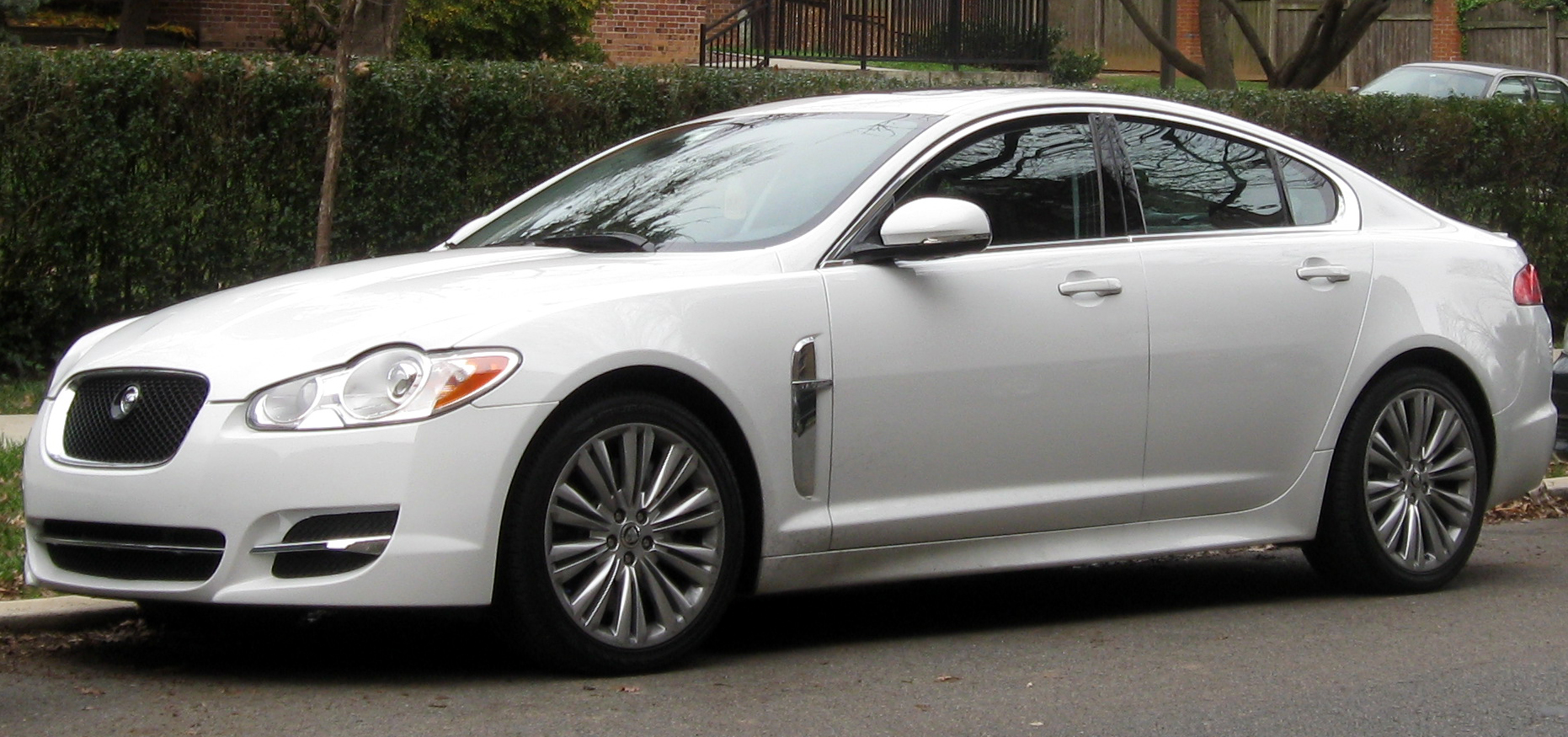
White Jaguar XF

Jaguar XF may refer to:

- Jaguar XF (X250) (2007–2015), an executive/luxury mid-size sports saloon car
- Jaguar XF (X260) (2015–2024), the second generation of the executive/mid-size luxury sports saloon
