= Jaguar C-XF =

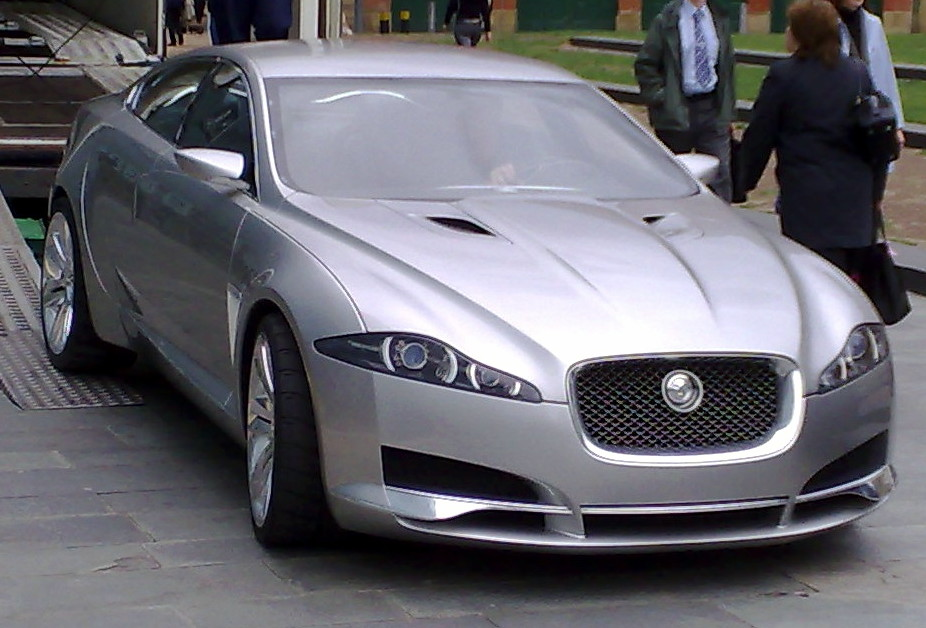

Overview
- Manufacturer: Jaguar Cars
- Production: 2007 (Concept)
- Designer: Ian Callum

Body and chassis
- Class: Full-size luxury car
- Body style: 4-door saloon
- Related: Jaguar XF

Powertrain
- Engine: 4.2 L Jaguar AJ34S supercharged V8
- Transmission: 6-speed automatic

The Jaguar C-XF (or Concept-XF) was a concept car that was designed to showcase the preliminary styling cues of the yet to be announced Jaguar XF. The C-XF was unveiled in the 2007 North American International Auto Show with the production version of the XF announced in the Autumn of 2007 at the Frankfurt Motor Show.

The C-XF project was led by Jaguar Director of Design Ian Callum and Head of Advanced Design Julian Thomson. It featured a 4.2-litre supercharged V8 engine, a 6-speed automatic transmission with Jaguar Sequential Shift, single slim-wedged headlamps which have evolved from the twin-lamp motif seen on past Jaguars, performance-themed interior, JaguarDrive Selector, Dual View screen, and a Bowers & Wilkins audio system.

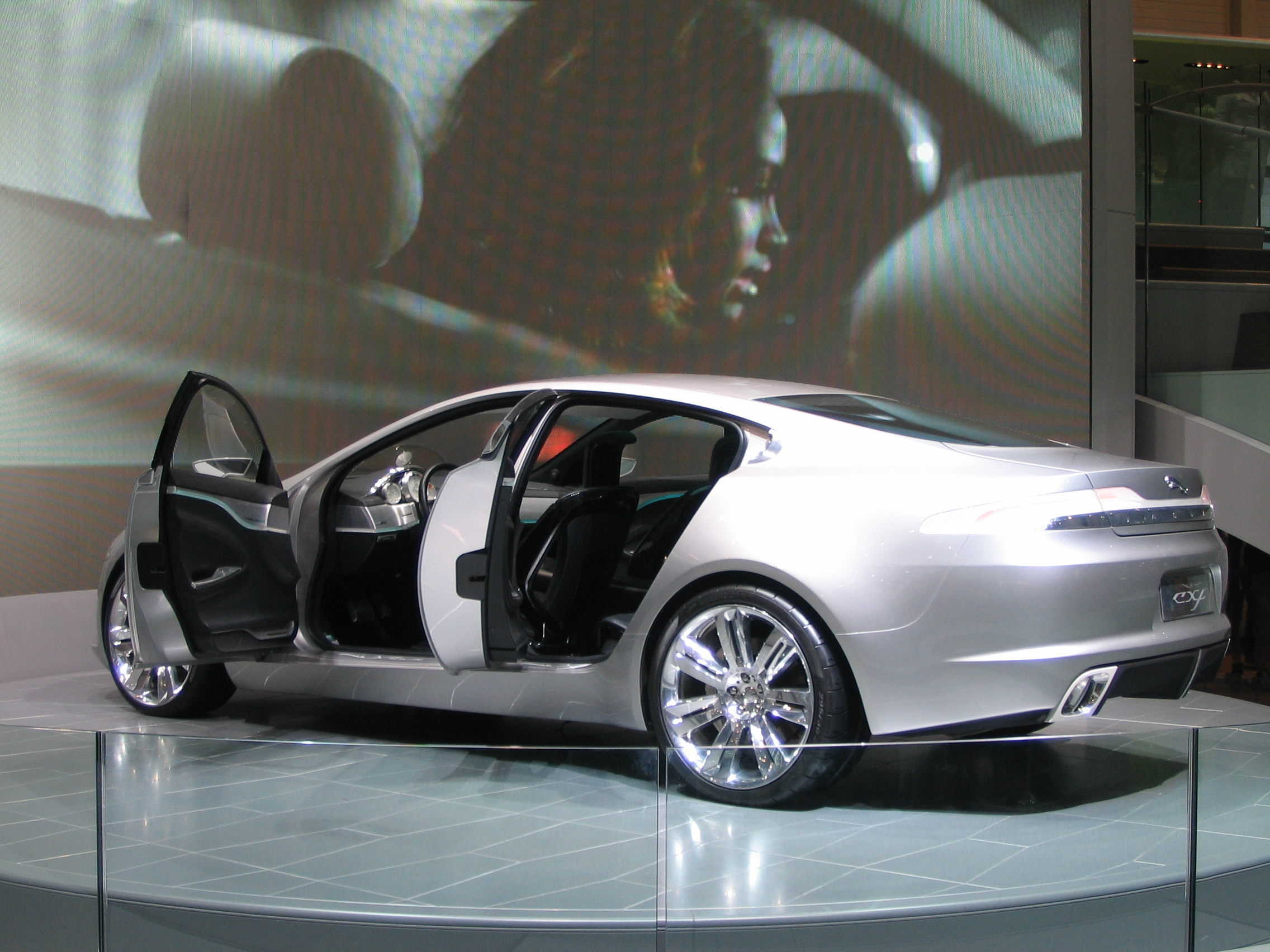
Rear view

A prototype with a body styling that was based on the S-Type had also been built, but was rejected before the C-XF concept was finalised.
