= Range Rover Velar =

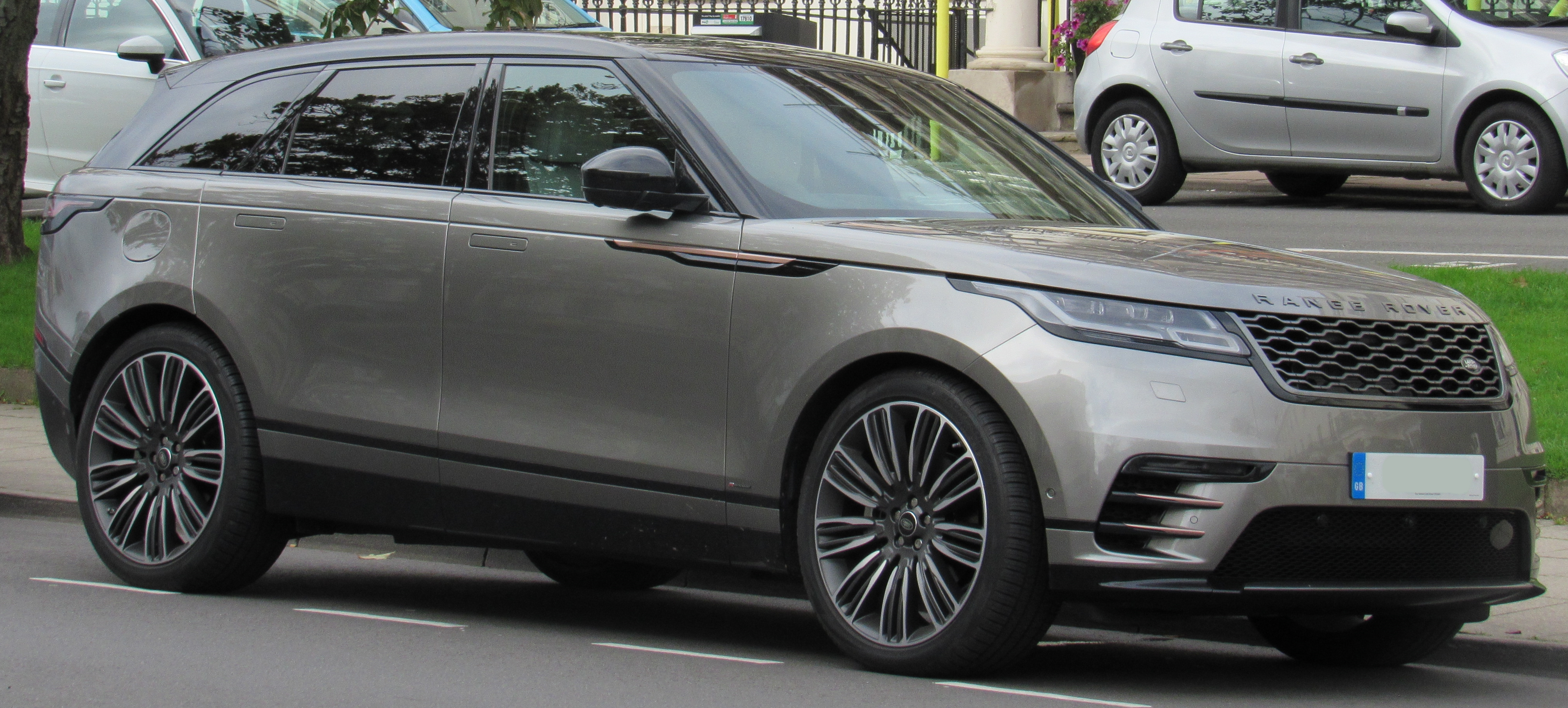

Overview
- Manufacturer: Jaguar Land Rover
- Model code: L560
- Production: 2017–present
- Assembly: United Kingdom: Solihull (Solihull plant); India: Pune (JLR India)
- Designer: Gerry McGovern

Body and chassis
- Class: Compact luxury crossover SUV
- Body style: 5-door SUV
- Layout: Front-engine, four-wheel-drive
- Chassis: Unibody
- Related: Jaguar XE; Jaguar XF (X260); Jaguar F-Pace

Powertrain
- Engine: Petrol: 2.0 L Ingenium turbo I4; 3.0 L P400 MHEV turbo I6; 3.0 L AJ126 SC V6; 5.0 L AJ133 SC V8; Petrol plug-in hybrid: 2.0 L Ingenium P400e I4; Diesel: 2.0 L Ingenium turbo I4; 2.0 L Ingenium twin-turbo I4; 2.0 L Ingenium MHEV turbo I4; 3.0 L AJD twin-turbo V6; 3.0 L Ingenium turbo I6
- Electric motor: 48V electric supercharger (MHEV); 106 kW (144 PS; 142 hp) Permanent Magnet Synchronous Motor (PHEV)
- Transmission: 8-speed ZF 8HP automatic
- Hybrid drivetrain: Mild hybrid (D200/P400); PHEV (P400e)
- Battery: 17.1 kWh Lithium ion (PHEV); 19.246/15.39 (total/usable) kWh (PHEV 2023)
- Plug-in charging: 35 kW DC (PHEV 2023); 7.4 kW AC (PHEV 2023)

Dimensions
- Wheelbase: 2,874 mm (113.1 in)
- Length: 4,803 mm (189.1 in)
- Width: 2,032 mm (80.0 in)
- Height: 1,665 mm (65.6 in)
- Kerb weight: 1,804–1,959 kg (3,977–4,319 lb)

The Range Rover Velar (/ˈvɛlɑːr/) is a crossover SUV produced by British automotive company Jaguar Land Rover (JLR) under their Land Rover marque. The fourth model in the Range Rover line, the Velar was unveiled on 1 March 2017 in London, England. The Velar was released in the summer of 2017. The name Velar had previously been used for a series of pre-production first-generation Range Rovers in 1969.

== Overview ==
The Range Rover Velar was named "World's Most Beautiful Car" in 2018, receiving the design award at the 2018 World Car Awards.

The vehicle received a facelift in 2023.

=== Design ===
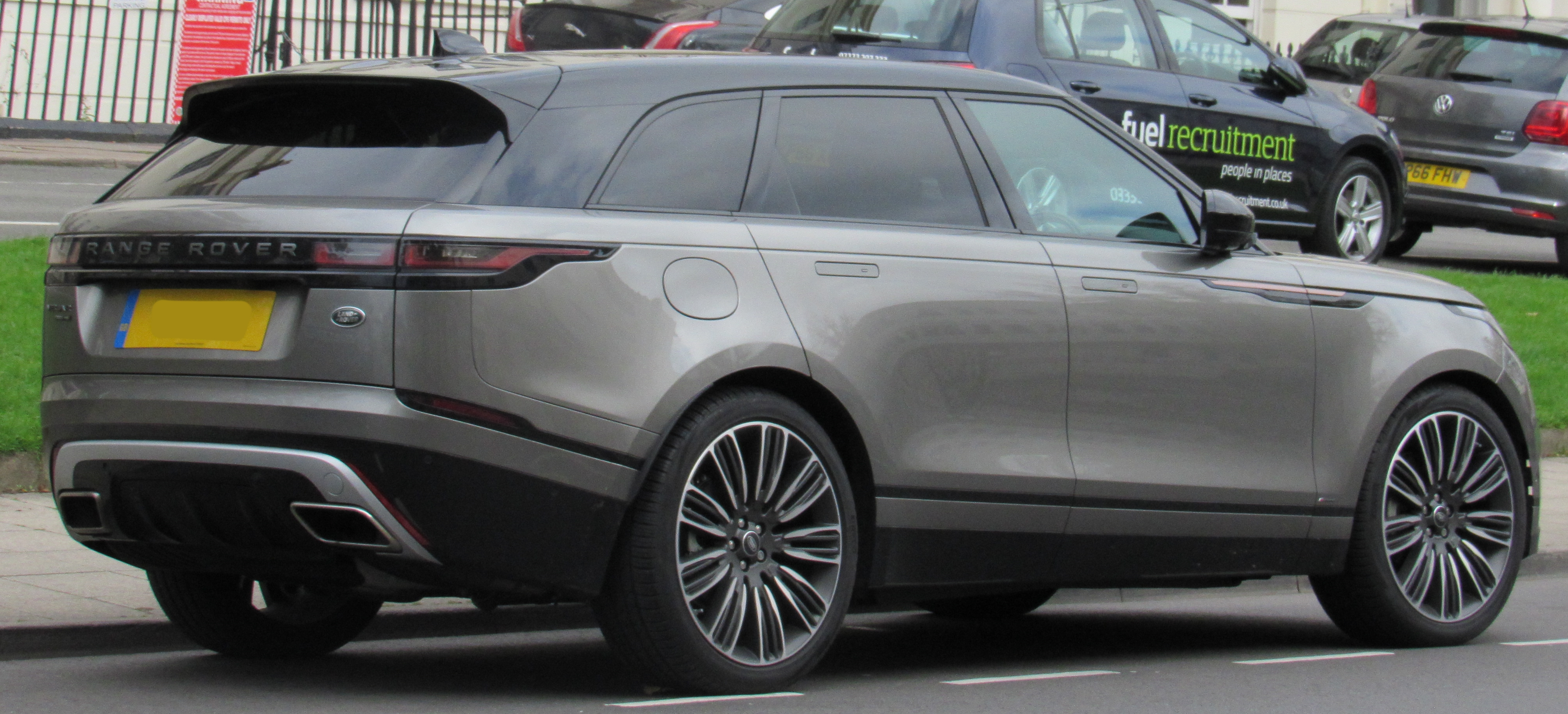
2017 Range Rover Velar First Edition D3

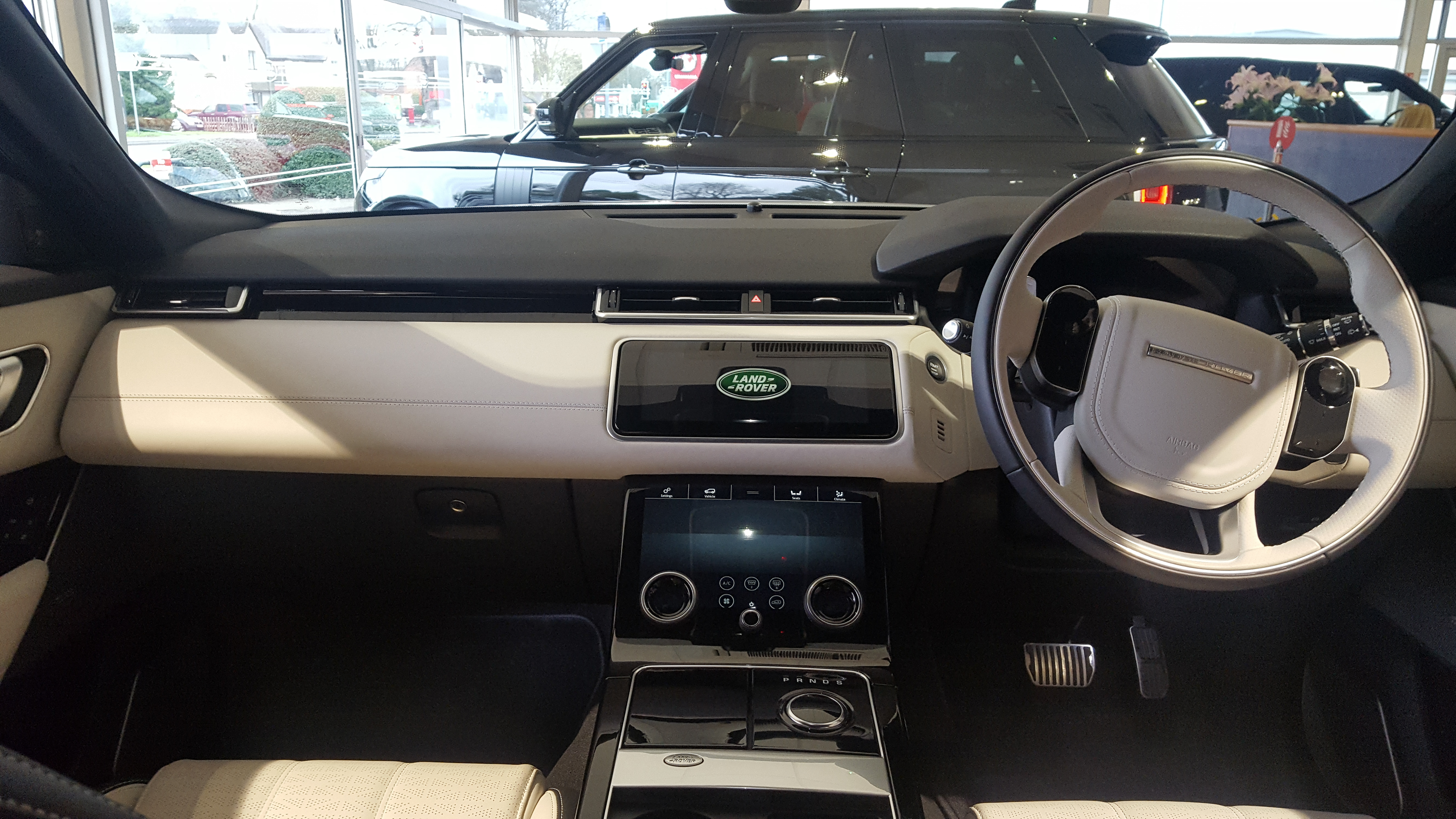
Interior

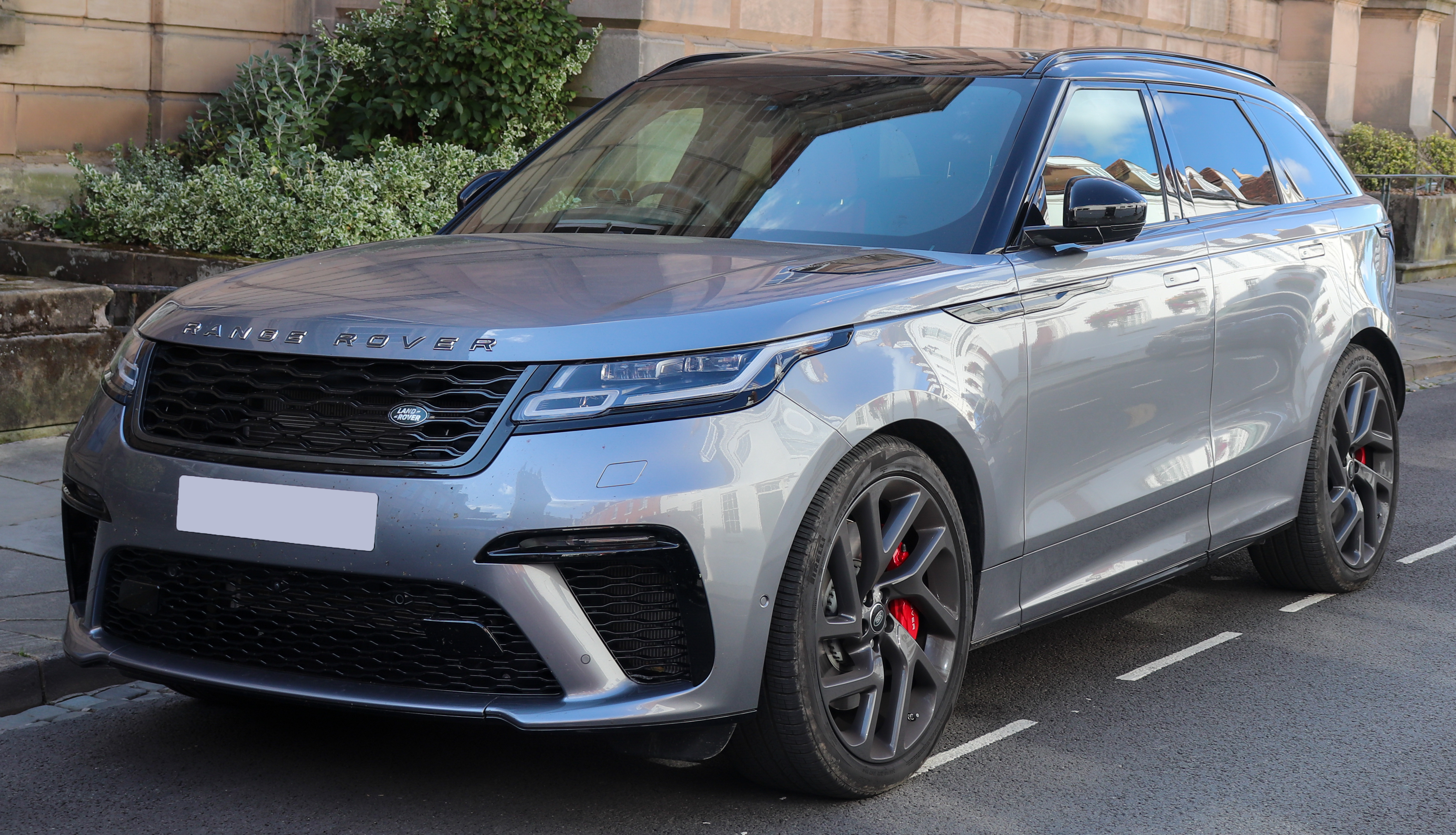

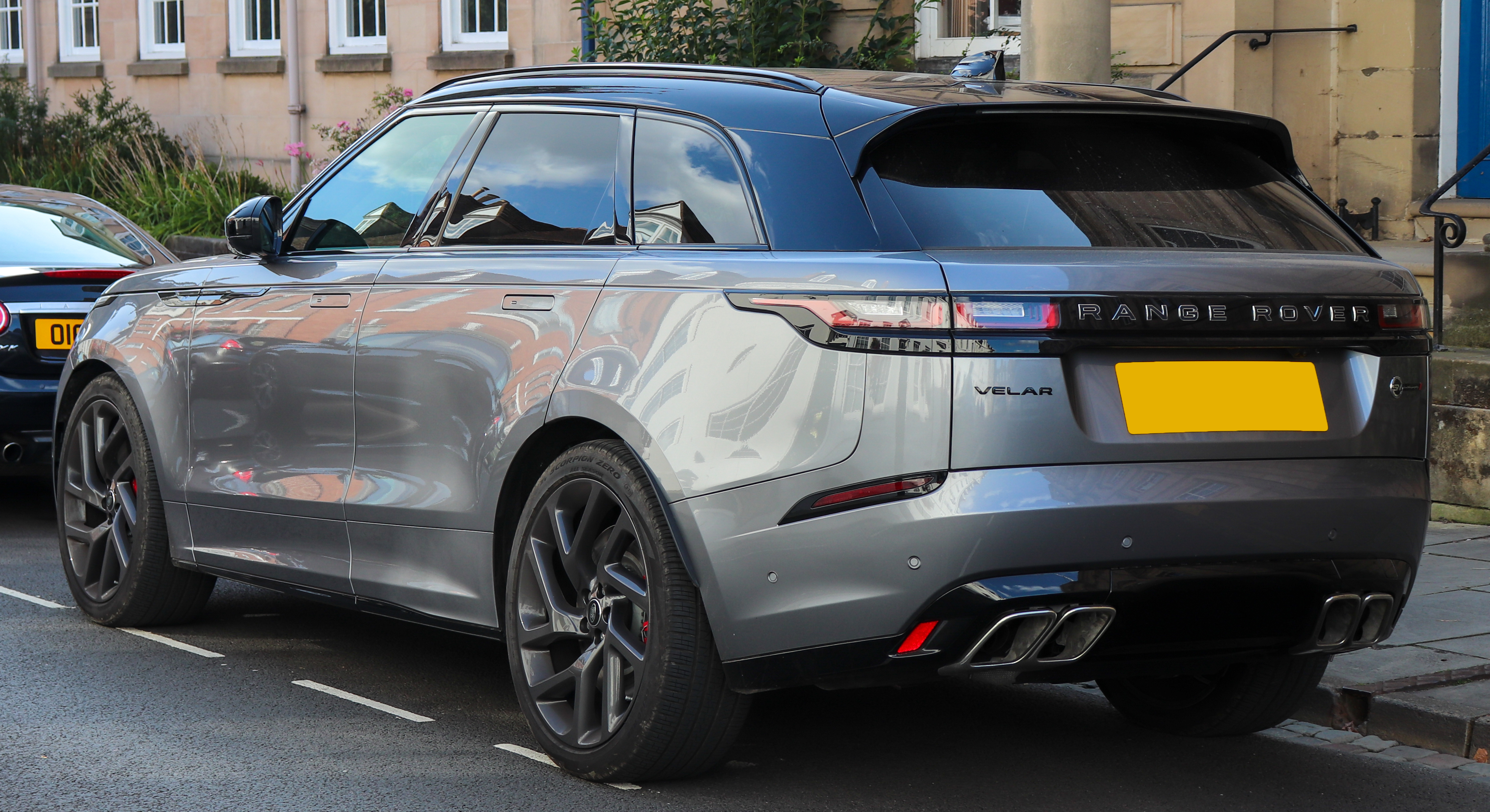
2020 Range Rover Velar SVAutobiography Dynamic Edition

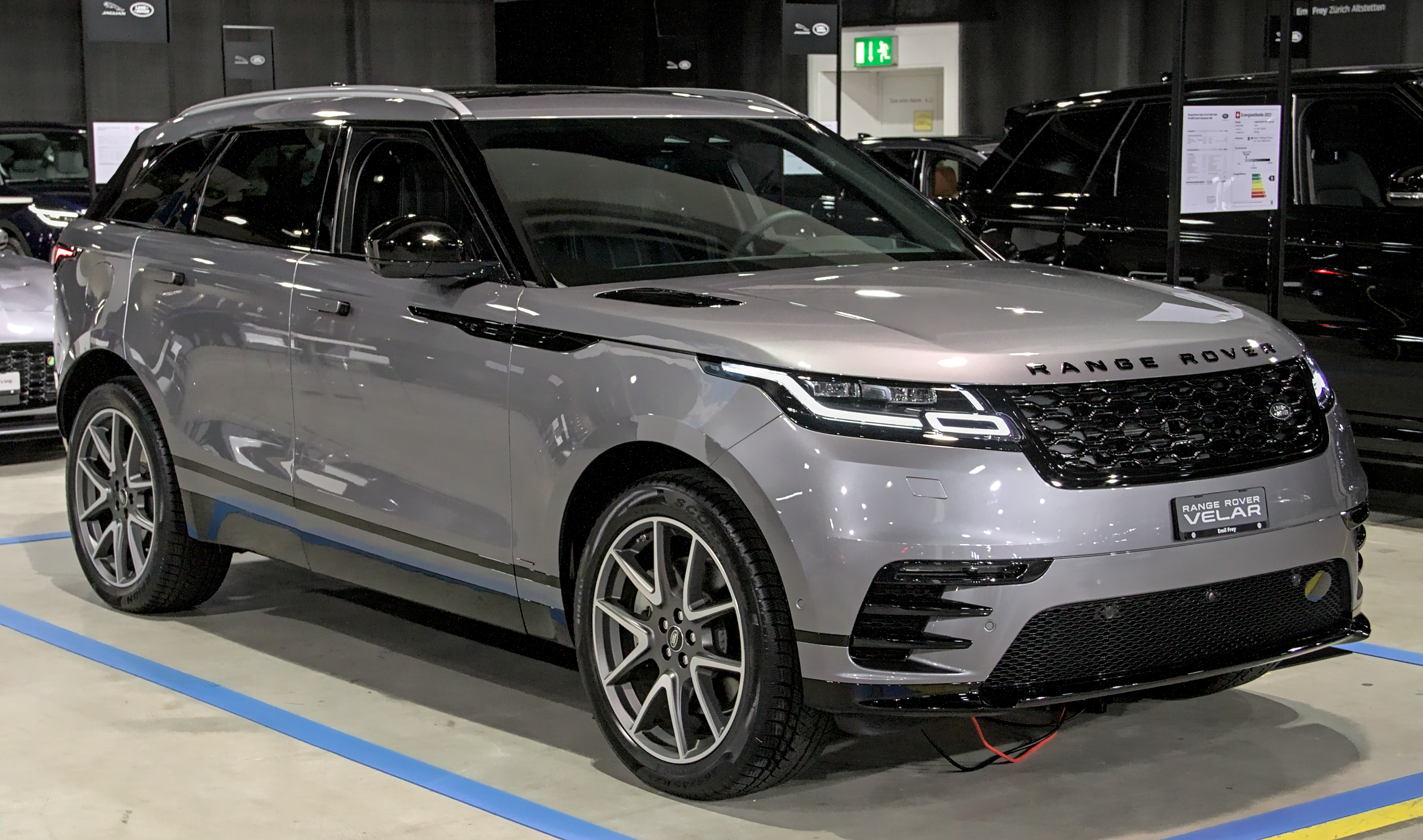

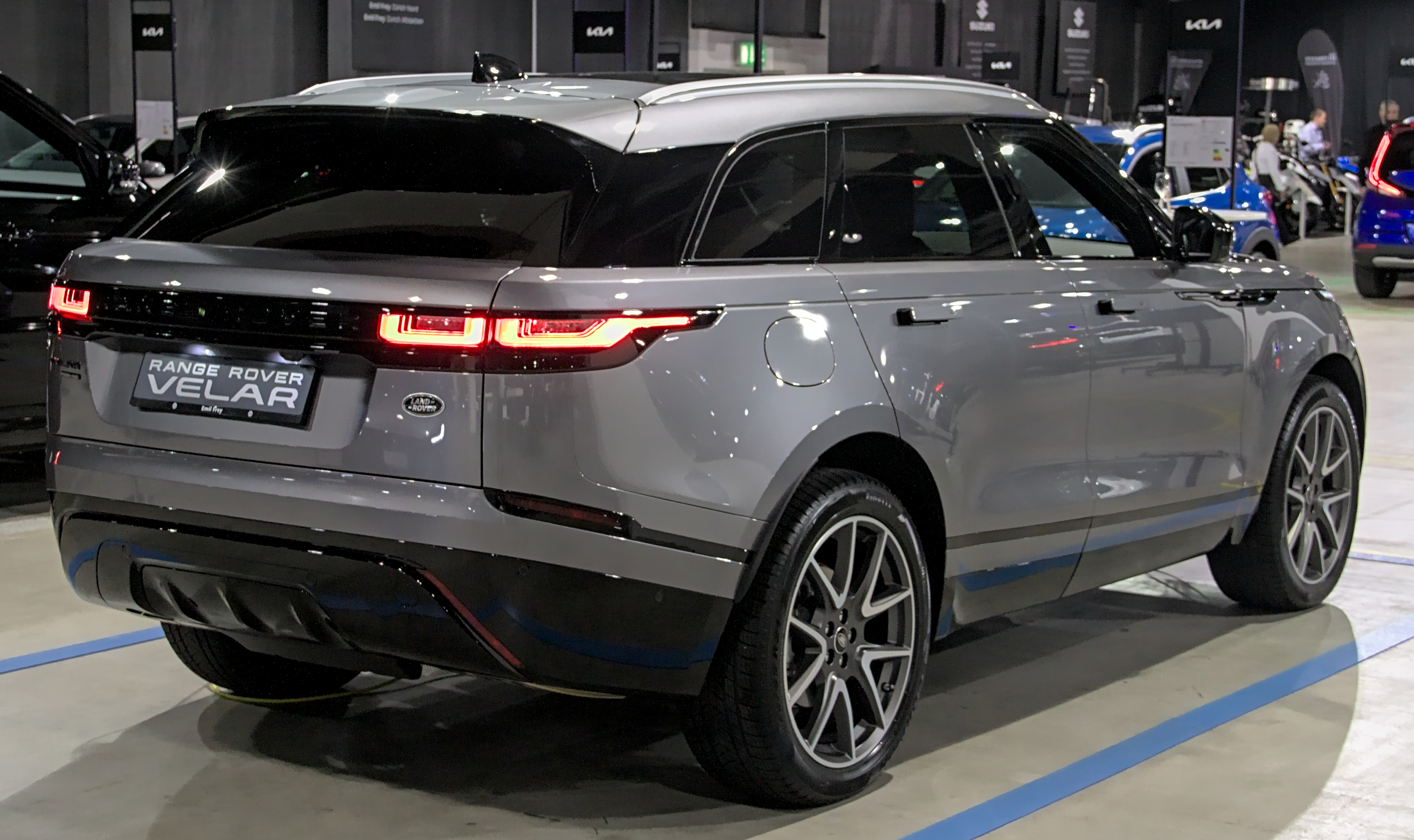
2021 Range Rover Velar P400e

The Range Rover Velar ushers in a new design language for Land Rover that is influenced by Land Rover's previous design language that began with the Evoque and most recently was used in the Range Rover Sport. The new design language features smoother lines on the body, and emphasises sportiness and on-road ability, but more important is the new interior design language that begins with the Velar, which will later spread to other Range Rover models. The interior of the Velar is influenced by that of the Jaguar I-Pace of 2018 and features 3 touchscreens, which control most of the interior features of the Velar. A review of the Velar on Bloomberg.com described its cockpit as being more driver-focused and stated its sitting position was lower than any other Land Rover before, as sportiness and on-road performance are top priorities.

=== Launch ===
The Range Rover Velar was first officially revealed in a series of teaser photos on 22 February 2017, and unveiled at an event at the London Design Museum on 1 March 2017. The official launch was at the Geneva Motor Show on 7 March 2017, with it being made available for order shortly after and the first deliveries making it to dealers in the summer of 2017.

=== Specifications ===
==== Platform ====
Built on the Jaguar Land Rover iQ[AI] (D7a) platform, the Range Rover Velar shares a number of components with the Jaguar F-Pace, XF, and XE models, notably its aluminium platform and 2,874 mm (113.1 in) wheelbase. The Velar is built at the same factory in Solihull. However, the Range Rover is 72 mm (2.8 in) longer than the F-Pace.

==== Towing capacity ====
Towing capacity for the Velar is 2,500 kg (5,500 lb), significantly less than a standard Range Rover.

==== Engines ====
Like its platform-mates, the Range Rover Velar uses Jaguar Land Rover's Ingenium line of four-cylinder diesel and petrol engines in addition to JLR's six-cylinder engines. All 4-cylinder engines are paired with the ZF (8HP45) 8-speed automatic transmission, while all 6-cylinder engines mate with the ZF (8HP70) 8-speed automatic transmission.

Diesel engine
Engine	Years	Engine displacement	Power at rpm	Torque at rpm	Transmission
2.0L turbo-diesel I4 (D180)	09/2017–09/2020	1,999 cc (122 cu in)	180 PS (132 kW; 178 hp) at 4,000	430 N⋅m (317 lb⋅ft) at 1,500	8-speed automatic
2.0L turbo-diesel I4 (D200)	09/2020–	1,999 cc (122 cu in)	204 PS (150 kW; 201 hp) at 3,750	430 N⋅m (317 lb⋅ft) at 1,750 - 2,500	8-speed automatic
2.0L Twin-Turbo diesel I4 (D240)	09/2017–09/2020	1,999 cc (122 cu in)	240 PS (177 kW; 237 hp) at 4,000	500 N⋅m (369 lb⋅ft) at 1,500	8-speed automatic
3.0L Twin-Turbo diesel V6 (D275)	04/2018–09/2020	2,993 cc (183 cu in)	275 PS (202 kW; 271 hp) at 4,000	625 N⋅m (461 lb⋅ft) at 1,500–1,750	8-speed automatic
3.0L Twin-Turbo diesel V6 (D300)	09/2017–09/2020	2,993 cc (183 cu in)	300 PS (221 kW; 296 hp) at 4,000	700 N⋅m (516 lb⋅ft) at 1,500–1,750	8-speed automatic
3.0L turbo-diesel I6 (D300)	09/2020-	2,996 cc (183 cu in)	300 PS (221 kW; 296 hp) at 4,000	650 N⋅m (479 lb⋅ft) at 1,500–2,500	8-speed automatic
Petrol engine
2.0L turbocharged I4 (P250)	09/2017–09/2020	1,999 cc (122 cu in)	250 PS (184 kW; 247 hp) at 5,500	365 N⋅m (269 lb⋅ft) at 1,200–4,500	8-speed automatic ZF 8HP45
2.0L turbocharged I4 (P250)	09/2020–	1,997 cc (122 cu in)	250 PS (184 kW; 247 hp) at 5,500	365 N⋅m (269 lb⋅ft) at 1,300–4,500	8-speed automatic ZF 8HP45
2.0L twin-turbocharged I4 (P300)	09/2017–09/2020	1,999 cc (122 cu in)	300 PS (221 kW; 296 hp) at 5,500	400 N⋅m (295 lb⋅ft) at 1,500-4,500	8-speed automatic ZF 8HP45
2.0L turbocharged PHEV I4 (P400e)	09/2020–	1,997 cc (122 cu in) plus Permanent Magnet Synchronous Motor	404 PS (297 kW; 398 hp) at 5,500	640 N⋅m (472 lb⋅ft) at 1,500-4,500	8-speed automatic ZF 8HP45
3.0L supercharged V6 (P340)	06/2018–	2,995 cc (183 cu in)	340 PS (250 kW; 335 hp) at 6,500	450 N⋅m (332 lb⋅ft) at 3,500–5,000	8-speed automatic ZF 8HP70
3.0L supercharged V6 (P380)	09/2017–09/2020	2,995 cc (183 cu in)	380 PS (279 kW; 375 hp) at 6,500	450 N⋅m (332 lb⋅ft) at 3,500–5,000	8-speed automatic ZF 8HP70
3.0L turbocharged I6 (P400)	09/2020–	2,996 cc (182.8 cu in)	400 PS (294 kW; 395 hp) at 5,500–6,500	550 N⋅m (406 lb⋅ft) at 2,000–5,000	8-speed automatic ZF 8HP70
5.0L supercharged V8 (SVAutobiography Dynamic)	02/2019–09/2020	4,999 cc (305 cu in)	550 PS (405 kW; 542 hp) at 6,500	680 N⋅m (502 lb⋅ft) at 3,500	8-speed automatic

=== Safety ===
ANCAP test results Range Rover Velar, all variants excluding SV & PHEV (2017, aligned with Euro NCAP)
Test	Points	%
Overall:	5 /5 stars	
Adult occupant:	35.4	93%
Child occupant:	41.8	85%
Pedestrian:	31.2	74%
Safety assist:	8.7	72%
