= Jaguar XF (X250) =

First generation of Jaguar XF

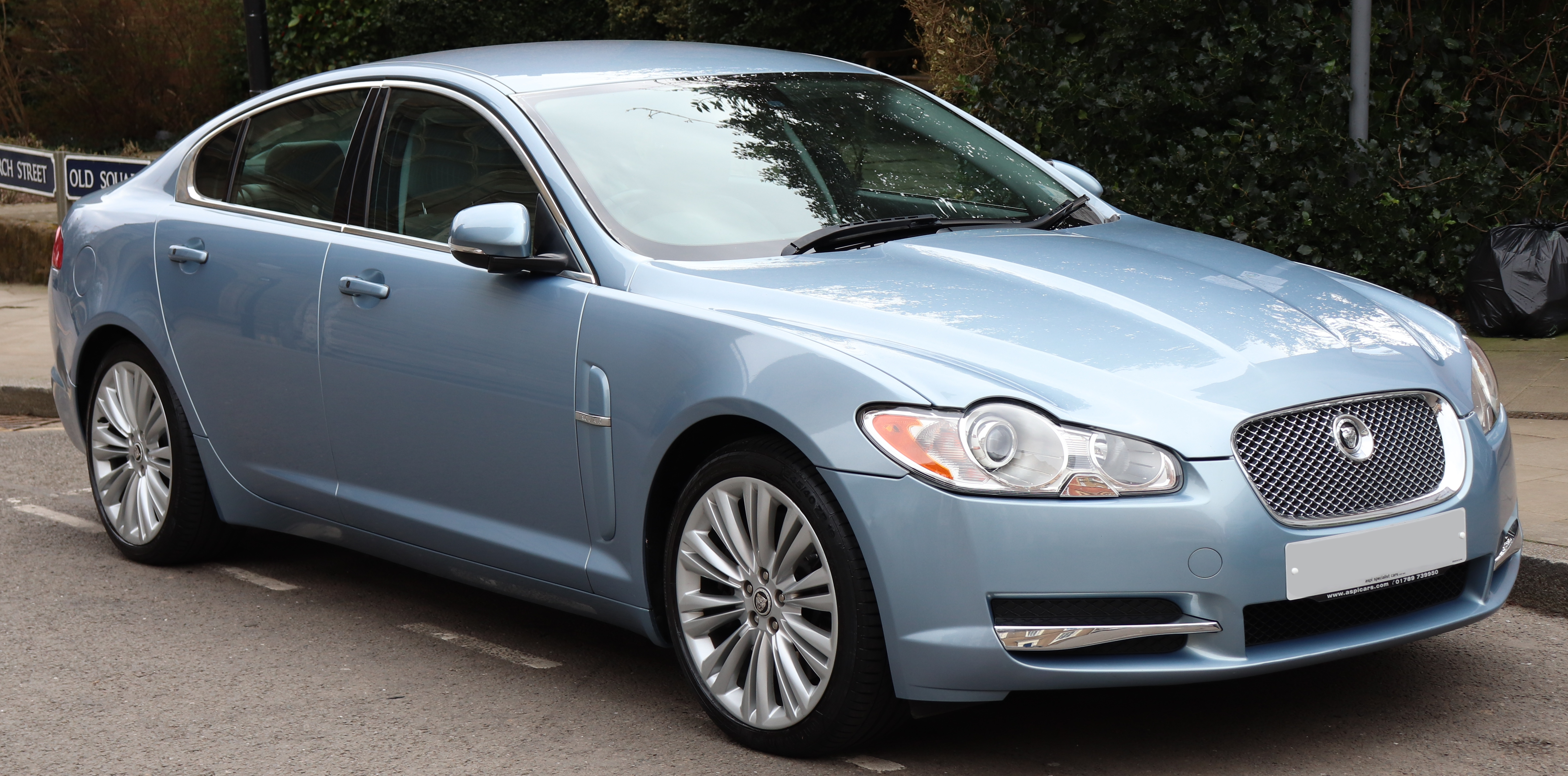

Overview
- Manufacturer: Jaguar Cars (2007–2012); Jaguar Land Rover (2013–2015)
- Model code: X250
- Production: November 2007 – June 2015
- Model years: 2008–2015
- Assembly: United Kingdom: Birmingham (Castle Bromwich Assembly); India: Pune (Jaguar Land Rover India, CKD)
- Designer: Ian Callum (2005)

Body and chassis
- Class: Executive car (E)
- Body style: 4-door saloon 5-door estate
- Layout: Front-engine, rear-wheel-drive; Front-engine, all-wheel-drive
- Platform: Ford DEW98
- Related: Lincoln LS (2000–2006); Ford Thunderbird (2002–2005); Jaguar S-Type (1999–2008)

Powertrain
- Engine: Petrol 2.0-litre turbocharged Ford Ecoboost I4; 3.0-litre Jaguar AJ30 V6; 3.0-litre supercharged Jaguar AJ126 V6; 4.2-litre Jaguar AJ34 V8; 4.2-litre supercharged Jaguar AJ34S V8; 5.0-litre Jaguar AJ133 V8; 5.0-litre supercharged Jaguar AJ133S V8; Diesel 2.2-litre Ford Duratorq I4; 2.7-litre Ford AJD V6; 3.0-litre Ford AJD V6
- Transmission: 6-speed ZF6HP26/ZF6HP28 automatic; 8-speed 8HP70 automatic; 6-speed ZF S6 manual (2015)

Dimensions
- Wheelbase: 2,909 mm (114.5 in)
- Length: 4,961 mm (195.3 in) (Saloon); 4,966 mm (195.5 in) (Sportbrake)
- Width: 1,877 mm (73.9 in) (exc. mirrors; 2008–2011); 2,077 mm (81.8 in) (inc. mirrors; 2008–2011); 80.8 in (2,052 mm) (2012 onwards)
- Height: 1,460 mm (57.5 in)
- Kerb weight: 1,850 kg (4,079 lb)

Chronology
- Predecessor: Jaguar S-Type
- Successor: Jaguar XF (X260)

The Jaguar XF (X250) is an executive luxury sports saloon car that was manufactured and marketed by the British automobile manufacturer Jaguar Cars. The XF was available as a four-door saloon and a five-door estate marketed as the Sportbrake. Launched in Autumn 2007 as a replacement for the S-Type, the XF was designated internally as the X250. The X250 was succeeded by the X260 in 2015. X250 was the first of the new styled Jaguars.

== Overview ==
The XF was developed at Jaguar's Whitley design and development HQ in Whitley, Coventry and was built at Castle Bromwich Assembly facility in Birmingham.

Initially, the XF was planned to use an all aluminium platform but due to time constraints put by Jaguar's board on the development team, the X250 makes use of a heavily modified Ford DEW98 platform.

The XF was launched at the 2007 Frankfurt Motor Show, following the public showing of the C-XF concept in January 2007 at the North American International Auto Show. Customer deliveries commenced in March 2008, with a range of V6 and V8 engines.

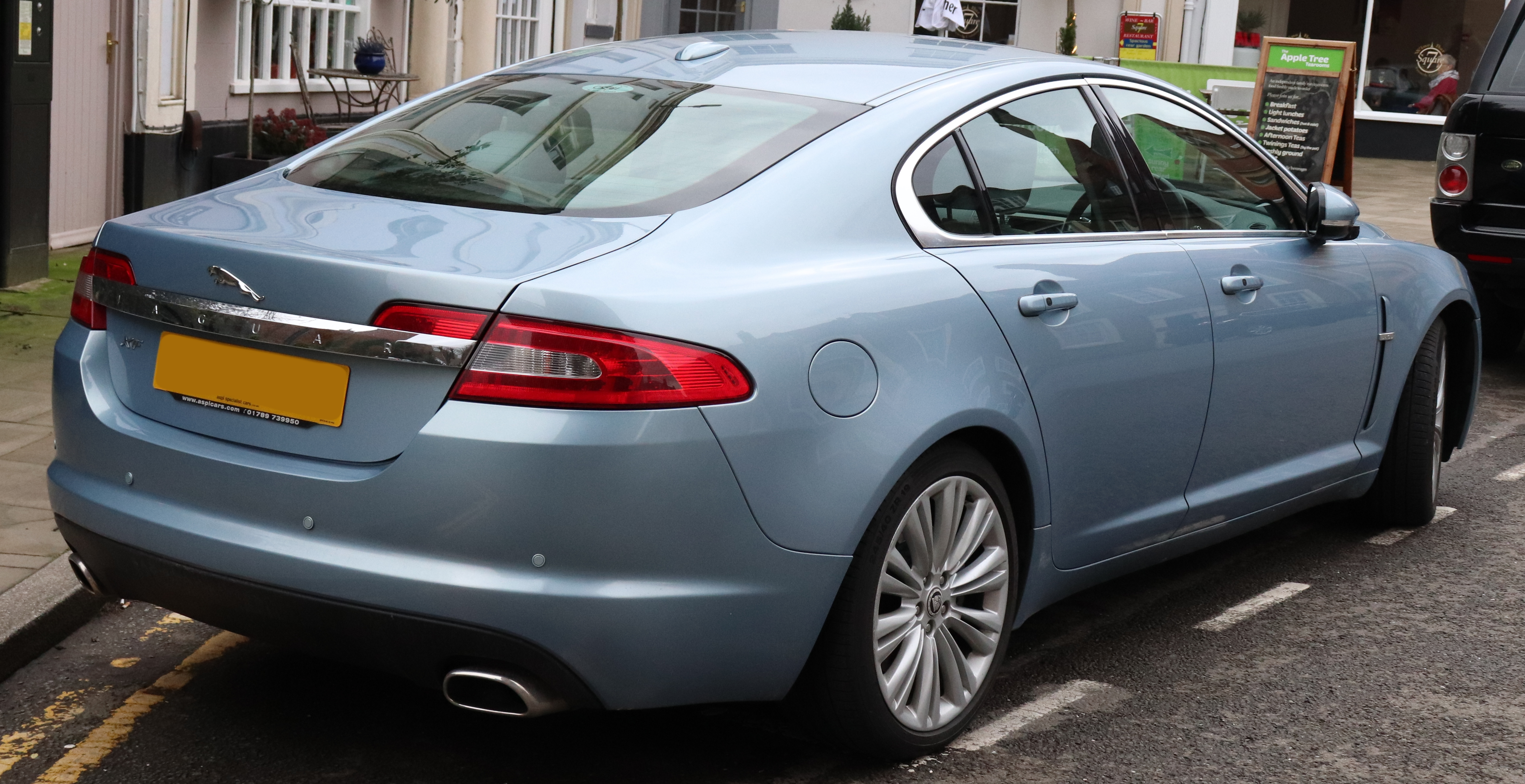
Pre-facelift Jaguar XF (rear view)

Designed by Jaguar's design director Ian Callum, the styling incorporates an oval mesh grille recalling the original XJ of 1968. The boot lid retained the S-Type's chromed blade to its edge and included a "leaper" bonnet mascot.

The XF was launched with a variety of trims called, depending on country, 'SE' (or 'Sport'), 'Luxury', 'Premium Luxury' (or 'Premium'), 'Portfolio' (or 'Premium Portfolio'), 'SV8' (or 'Supercharged') and 'R'. For the UK market, company car-friendly 'Executive Edition' and 'SE Business' models with a lower tuned versions of the 3.0 L and 2.2 L diesel engines respectively were available.

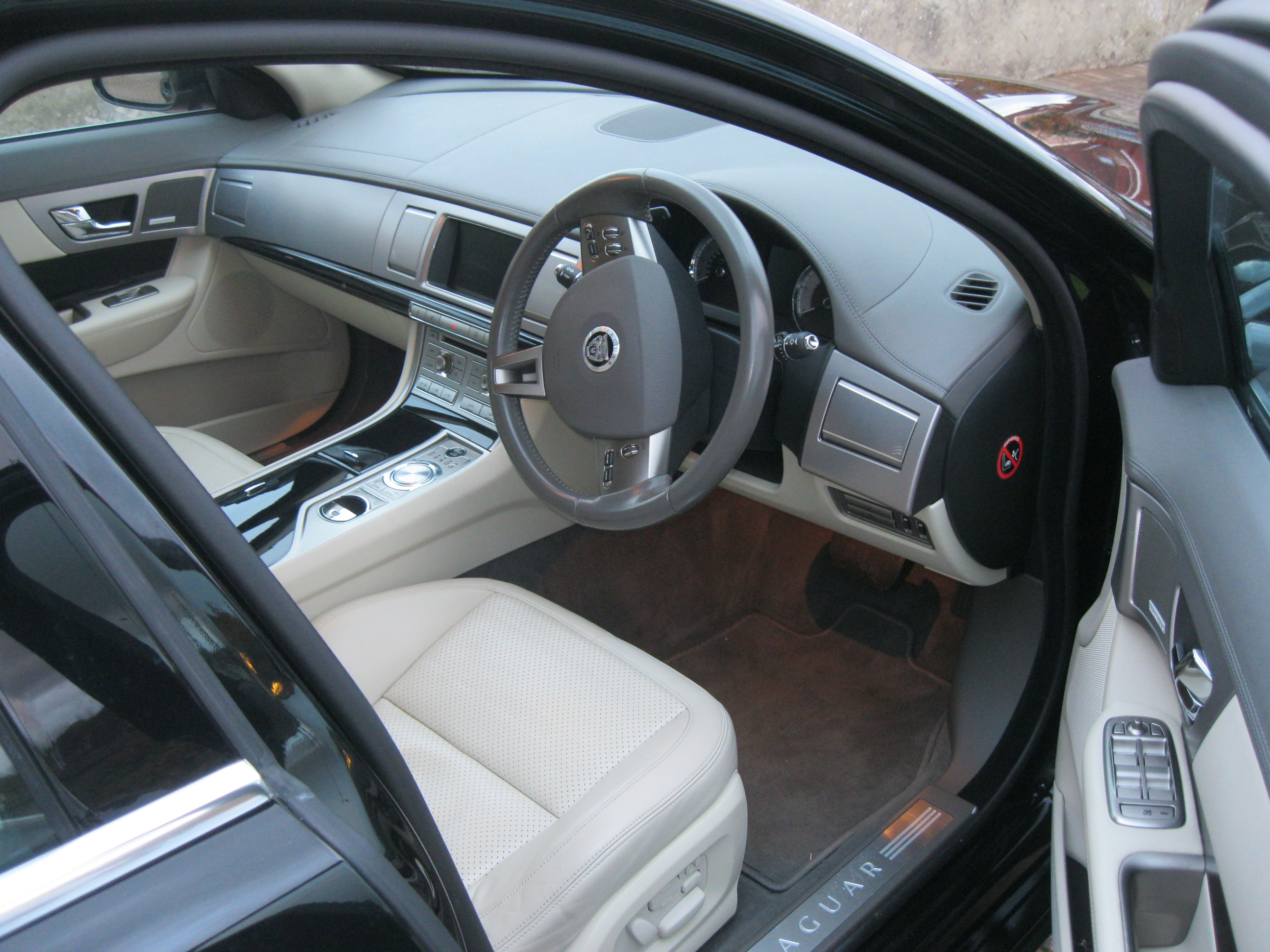
Interior

The interior includes air conditioning vents which are flush-fitting in the dash, rotating open once the engine is started, and a rotating gearshift dial, marketed as JaguarDrive Selector, which automatically elevates from the centre console. Another departure from the traditional Jaguar cabin ambiance is the use of pale-blue backlighting to the instruments, switchgear, and around major control panels. Some minor systems, such as the interior lighting, are controlled by touching the light covers. The glove compartment also opens to the touch. The XF has no cloth interior option, with all trim levels featuring leathers. Wood veneers are available along with aluminium, carbon fibre and piano black lacquer trims.

== Models ==
=== XFR (2009–2015) ===
The XFR was announced at Detroit's North American International Auto Show in January 2009 as a new performance derivative of the XF range, and featured the new 5.0-litre supercharged AJ-V8 Gen III engine rated at 510 PS (375 kW; 503 hp), a revised front bumper and spoiler and 20-inch (508 mm) alloy wheels.

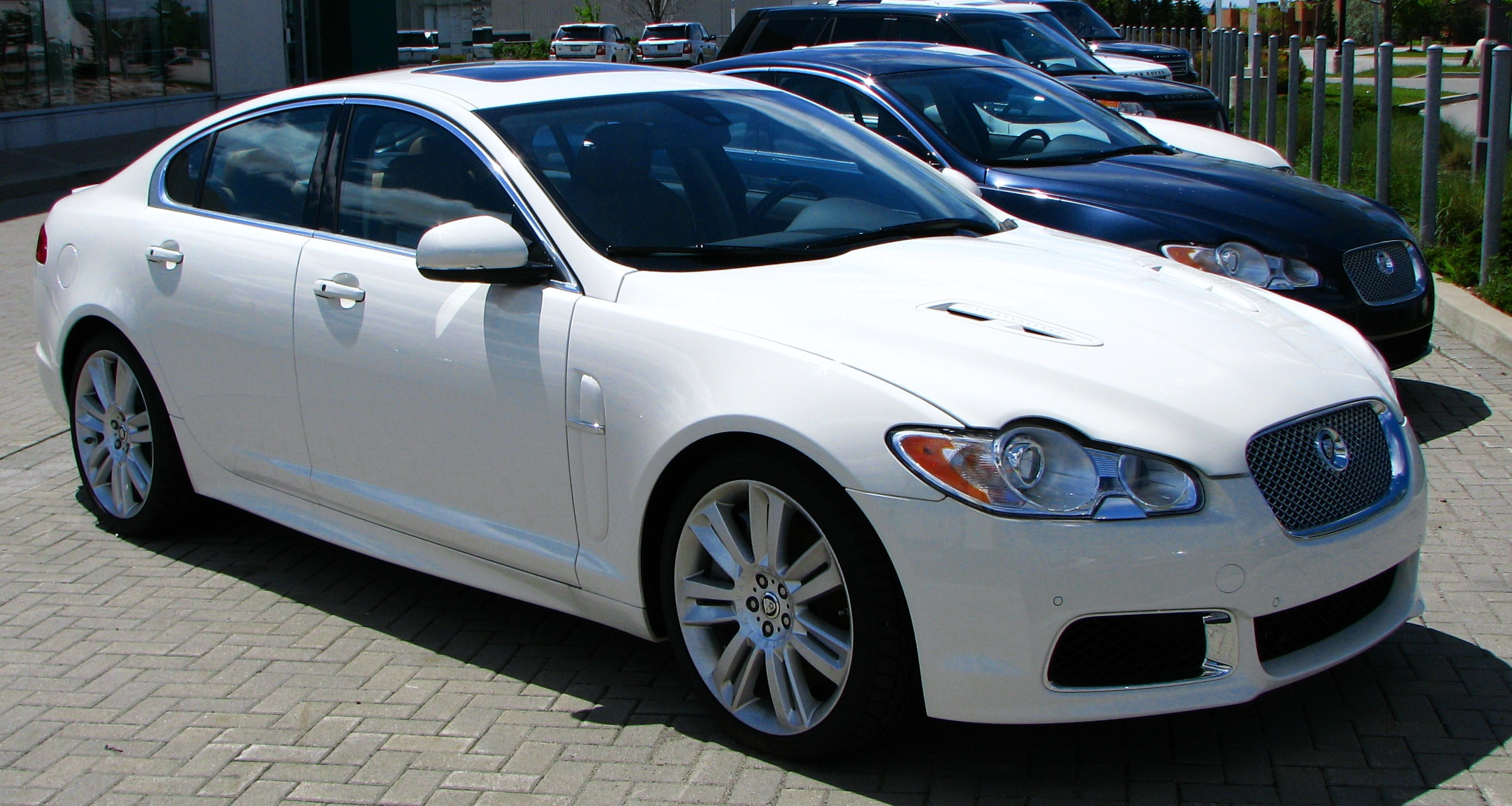
2010 Jaguar XFR

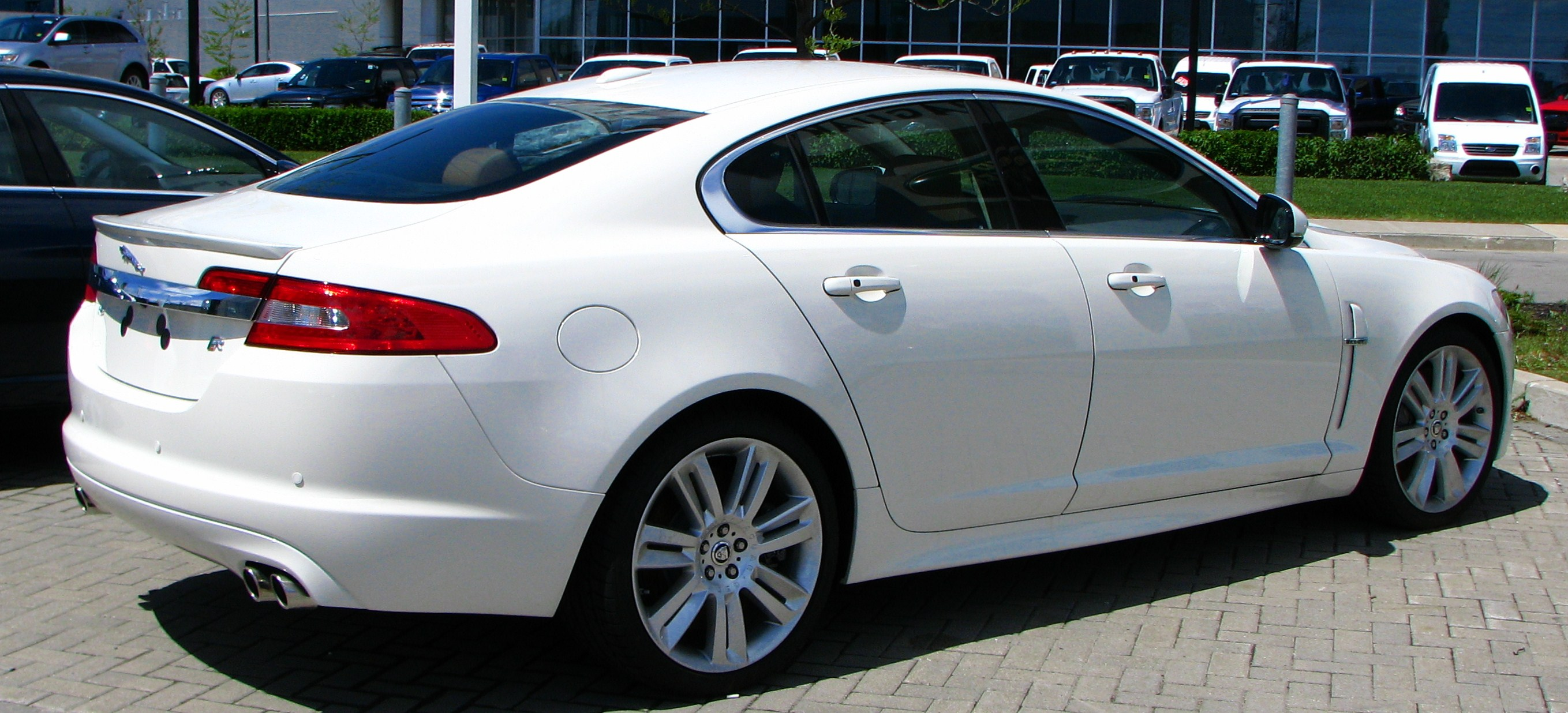
Rear view

== Facelift (2011) ==
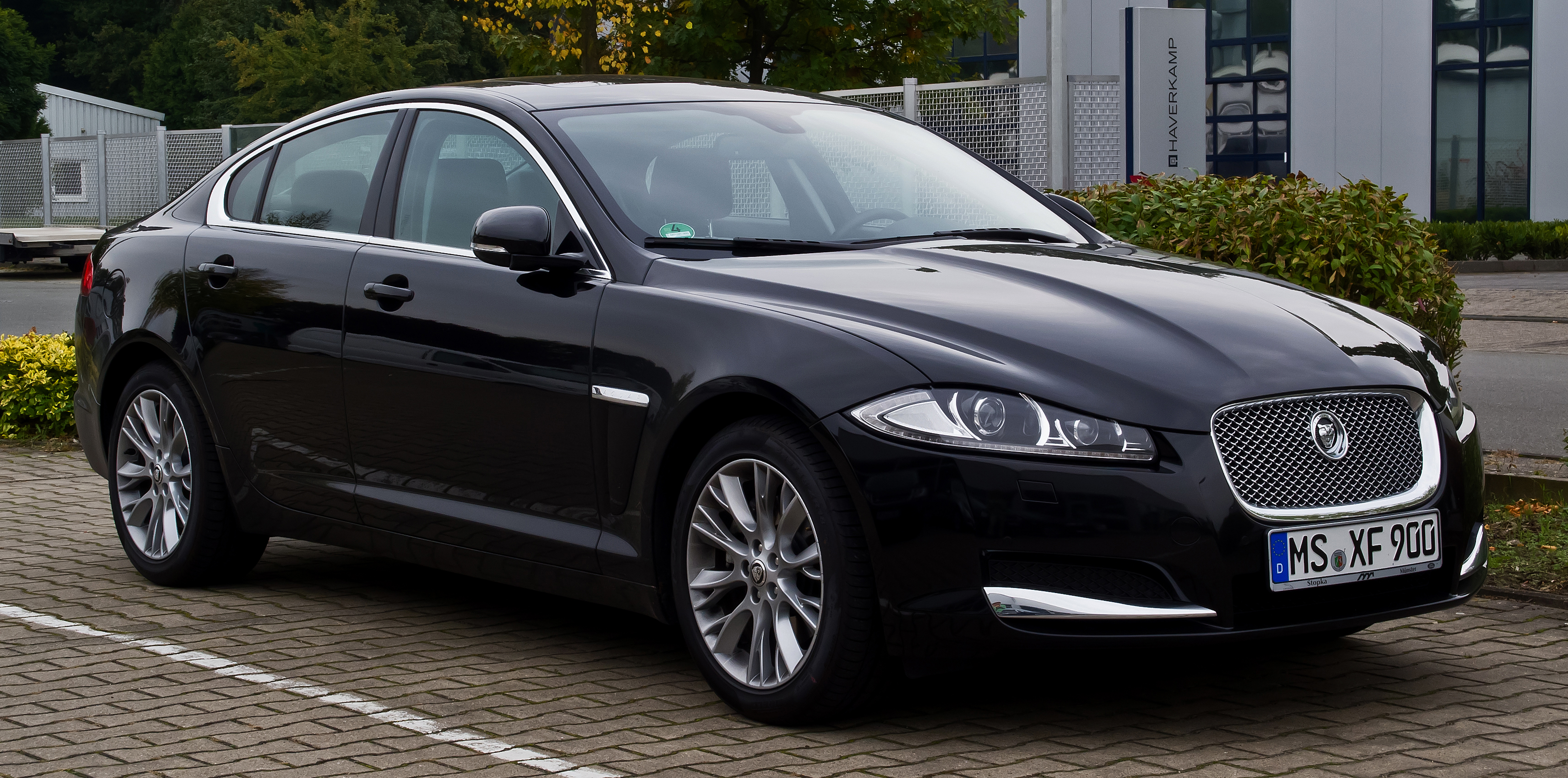
Facelift Jaguar XF

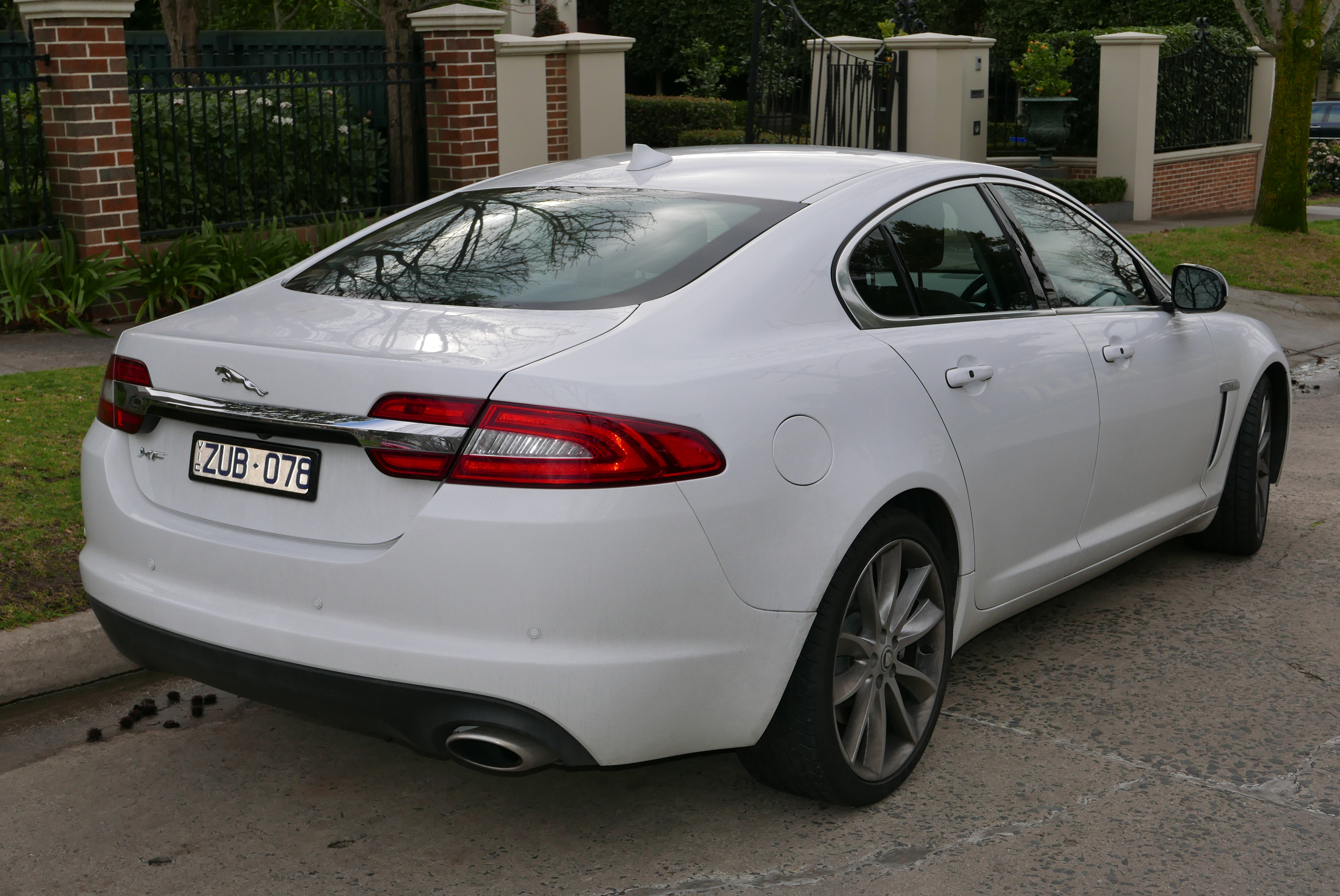
Rear view

In April 2011, Jaguar revealed the details of a facelift for the XF at the New York International Auto Show, with manufacturing beginning in July 2011.

The facelift includes front and rear styling changes which are based on the original Jaguar C-XF concept car, internal trim enhancements, adaptive cruise control, and a new four-cylinder 187 hp (139 kW; 190 PS) 450 N⋅m (332 lb⋅ft) 2.2-litre diesel engine, which is combined with a new eight-speed automatic transmission and stop-start technology to emit 149 g/km CO_{2} and fuel consumption of 52.3 mpg_{‑imp} (5.40 L/100 km; 43.5 mpg_{‑US}).

=== XF Sportbrake (2012–2015) ===
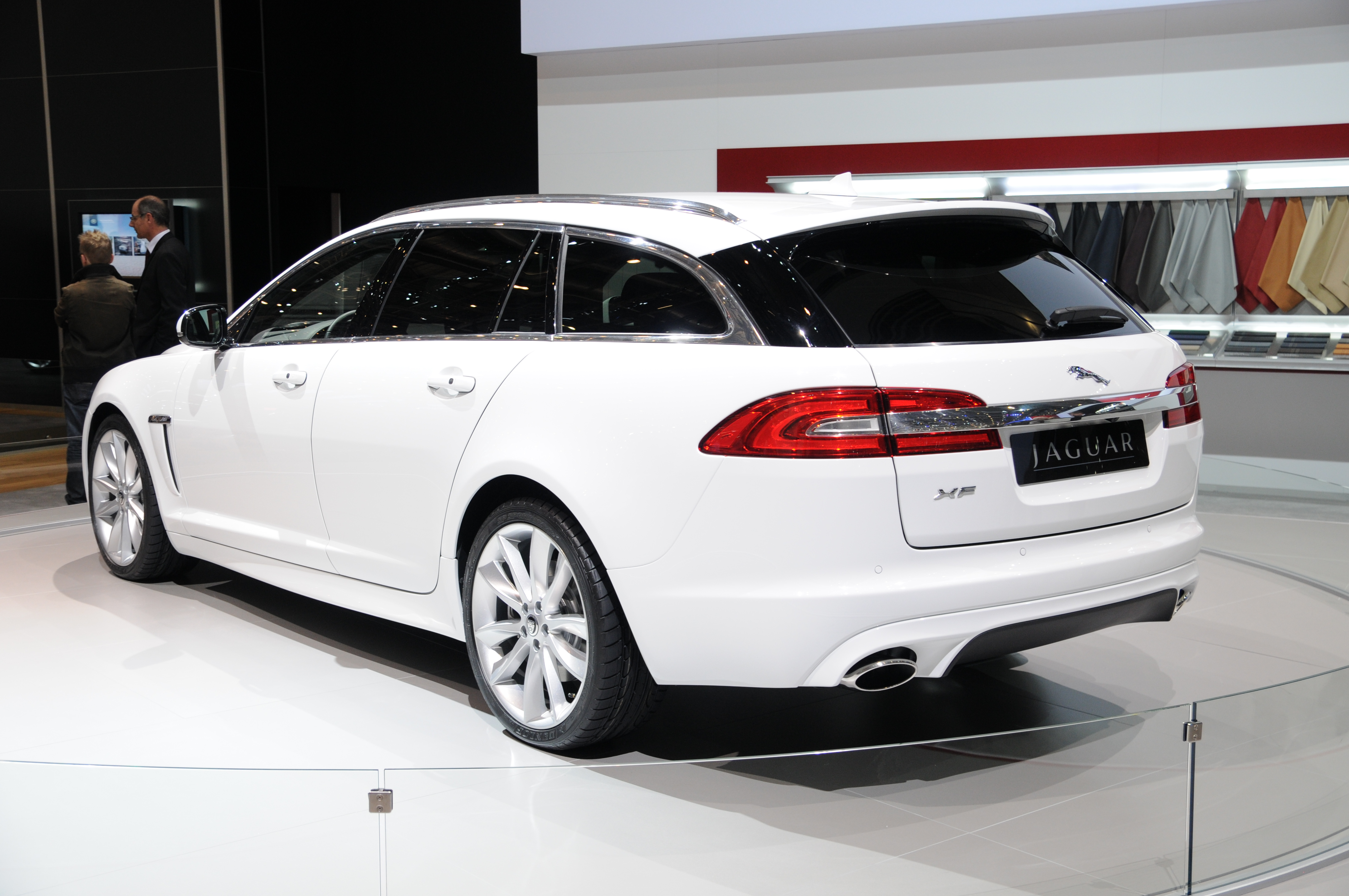
Jaguar XF Sportbrake

The Sportbrake was officially introduced in March 2012, and went on-sale in October of the same year. It is available with all of the saloon's engines and has a loading capacity of 550 litres (19 cubic feet) with the seats up and 1,675 litres (59.2 cubic feet) with them folded. The maximum capacity surpasses that of the contemporary BMW 5 Series (F10) Touring, Second Gen. Cadillac CTS Sport Wagon, and the Mercedes-Benz CLS-Class (X218) Shooting Brake. The extended roofline increases rear headroom by 48 mm (1.9 inches) and the rear bench includes a 60:40 split and remote-controlled 'one-touch' folding function. The load area is fitted with multi-function rails and is 1,970 mm (78 inches) long and 1,064 mm (41.9 inches) wide.

== XFR-S ==
An R-S version of the XF was confirmed in 2012 following an image released shortly before the Los Angeles Auto Show. It uses the same 5.0-litre supercharged V8 engine as the Jaguar XKR-S.

The engine is rated at 550 PS (542 hp; 405 kW) at 6,500 rpm and 680 N⋅m (502 lb⋅ft) of torque at 5,500 rpm. The XFR-S has a 0-60 mph (0-97 km/h) time of 4.4 seconds and a top speed of 186 mph (299 km/h). The XFR-S differs from the XFR as it has bespoke 20-inch alloy wheels, wider front grills and carbon fibre. The front grills aid aerodynamic efficiency as does the large rear wing and rear diffuser.

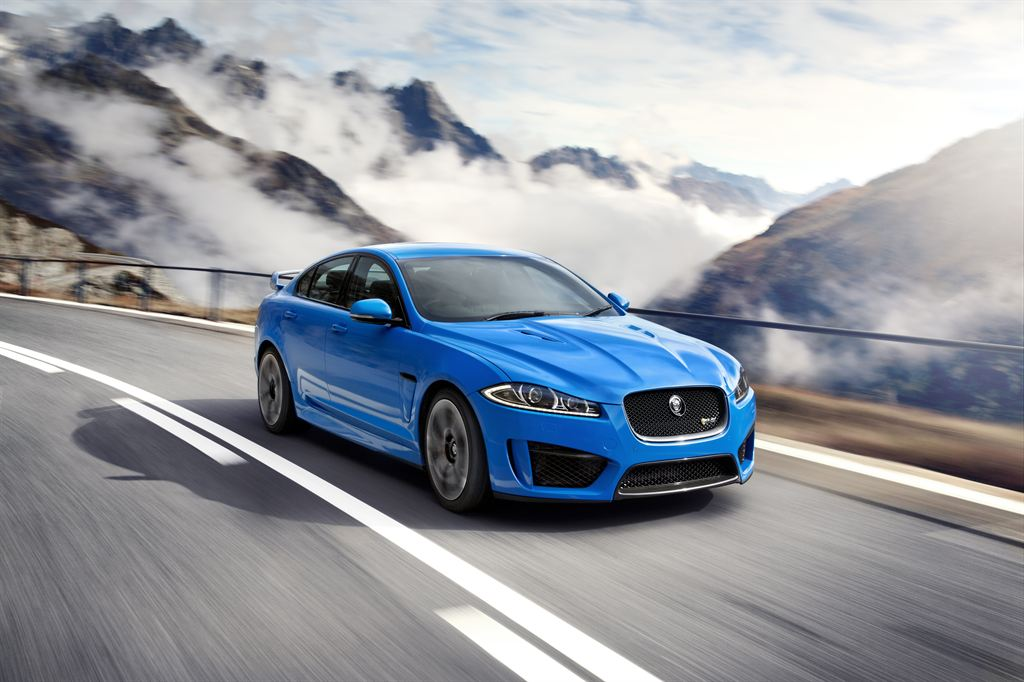
Jaguar XFR-S

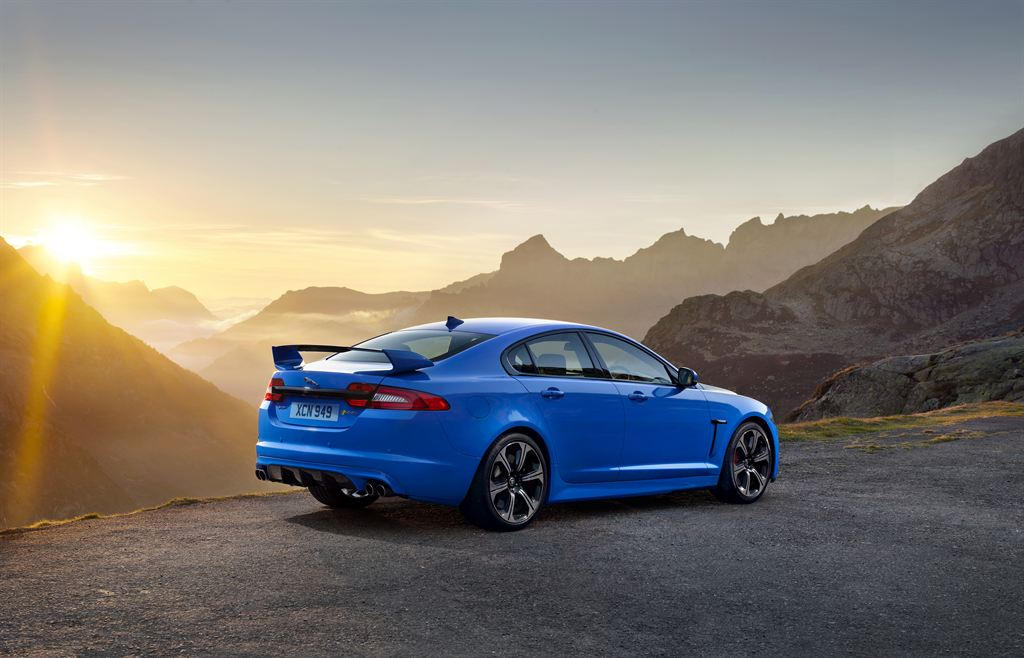
Jaguar XFR-S

== Specifications ==
=== Aerodynamics ===
The XF's body was developed using computational fluid dynamics (CFD) before wind tunnel testing. Every area from the outer skin to the lightweight, composite undertray to the cooling airflow (even the shape of the exterior mirrors) was optimised using this process. The higher, squarer tail is more efficient aerodynamically than a lower, rounded one, and the XF's coupé-like roofline and raised bootlid lip improve airflow over the rear of the car.

=== Chassis ===
The basic substructure of the XF has been carried over from the preceding S-Type, although the body has been stretched to meet crash safety requirements, and heightened to provide additional headroom while still retaining the "saloon within a coupé" proportions. The suspension and mountings are the same as that used on the XK, while the engine line-up is basically similar to that used in the S-Type.

Sound and vibration insulation is provided by the addition of a special underbody tray and engine mounts, a tuned exhaust system, and a double bulkhead between the engine bay and passenger compartment.

=== Engines ===
All XF models are automatic and are Euro 5 compliant. The naturally aspirated petrol 3.0-litre V6 was discontinued in Europe in 2010, but continued to be sold elsewhere for the X250's production lifespan.

Next Green Car (NGC) an organisation that analyses vehicle emissions and rates them from 0 (cleanest) to 100 (dirtiest) – analysed the emissions from X250 XF's range: ADAC's EcoTest has also rated three of the diesel engines.

Start	End	Model & transmission	Engine	Power	Torque	Top speed	0–100 km/h (0-60 mph) (seconds)	Economy	Emissions	NGC	EcoTest
Petrol
2012	–	Jaguar XF 2.0 i4 Ti	2.0 L, I4	241 PS (177 kW; 238 hp)	340 N⋅m (251 lb⋅ft)	241 km/h (150 mph)	7.9 (7.5)	31.7 mpg_{‑imp} (8.9 L/100 km)	207 g/km	–	
2008	2011	Jaguar XF 3.0 V6	3.0 L, V6	238 PS (175 kW; 235 hp)	293 N⋅m (216 lb⋅ft)	238 km/h (148 mph)	8.0 (7.6)	26.9 mpg_{‑imp} (10.5 L/100 km)	249 g/km	–	
2012	–	Jaguar XF 3.0 V6 Supercharged	3.0 L, V6	340 PS (250 kW; 335 hp)	450 N·m (332 lb·ft)	249 km/h (155 mph) (Limited)	5.9 (5.7)	30.0 mpg_{‑imp} (9.4 L/100 km)	224 g/km	61	
2008	2009	Jaguar XF 4.2 V8	4.2 L, V8	300 PS (221 kW; 296 hp)	420 N⋅m (310 lb⋅ft)	249 km/h (155 mph) (Limited)	6.7 (6.5)	25.5 mpg_{‑imp} (11.1 L/100 km)	264 g/km	–	
2008	2009	Jaguar XF 4.2 V8 Supercharged	4.2 L, V8	420 PS (309 kW; 414 hp)	560 N⋅m (413 lb⋅ft)	249 km/h (155 mph) (Limited)	5.4 (5.2)	22.4 mpg_{‑imp} (12.6 L/100 km)	299 g/km	–	
2009	2012	Jaguar XF 5.0 V8	5.0 L, V8	385 PS (283 kW; 380 hp)	515 N⋅m (380 lb⋅ft)	249 km/h (155 mph) (Limited)	5.7 (5.4)	25.8 mpg_{‑imp} (10.9 L/100 km)	254 g/km	70	
2009	–	Jaguar XF 5.0 V8 Supercharged	5.0 L, V8	470 PS (346 kW; 464 hp)	575 N⋅m (424 lb⋅ft)	249 km/h (155 mph) (Limited)	5.2 (4.9)	25.4 mpg_{‑imp} (11.1 L/100 km)	264 g/km	70	
2009	2015	Jaguar XFR 5.0 V8 Supercharged	5.0 L, V8	510 PS (375 kW; 503 hp)	625 N⋅m (461 lb⋅ft)	249 km/h (155 mph) (Limited)	4.9 (4.7)	24.4 mpg_{‑imp} (11.6 L/100 km)	270 g/km	71	
2012	2015	Jaguar XFR-S 5.0 V8 Supercharged	5.0 L, V8	550 PS (405 kW; 542 hp)	680 N⋅m (502 lb⋅ft)	299 km/h (186 mph) (Limited)	4.6 (4.4)	24.4 mpg_{‑imp} (11.6 L/100 km)	270 g/km	73	
Diesel
2011	2015	Jaguar XF 2.2 TDi4 163	2.2 L, I4	163 PS (120 kW; 161 hp)	400 N⋅m (295 lb⋅ft)	209 km/h (130 mph)	10.5 (9.8)	55.4 mpg_{‑imp} (5.10 L/100 km)	135 g/km	41	
2011	2012	Jaguar XF 2.2 TDi4 190	2.2 L, I4	190 PS (140 kW; 187 hp)	450 N⋅m (332 lb⋅ft)	225 km/h (140 mph)	8.5 (8.0)	52.3 mpg_{‑imp} (5.40 L/100 km)	149 g/km	43	82
2012	2015	Jaguar XF 2.2 TDi4 200	2.2 L, I4	200 PS (147 kW; 197 hp)	450 N⋅m (332 lb⋅ft)	225 km/h (140 mph)	8.5 (8.0)	52.0 mpg_{‑imp} (5.43 L/100 km)	139 g/km	41	
2008	2009	Jaguar XF 2.7 TDV6 204	2.7 L, V6	204 PS (150 kW; 201 hp)	435 N⋅m (321 lb⋅ft)	229 km/h (142 mph)	8.5 (8.2)	37.7 mpg_{‑imp} (7.49 L/100 km)	199 g/km	–	65
2010	2011	Jaguar XF 3.0 TDV6 211	3.0 L, V6	211 PS (155 kW; 208 hp)	450 N⋅m (332 lb⋅ft)	240 km/h (149 mph)	8.4 (8.1)	41.5 mpg_{‑imp} (6.81 L/100 km)	179 g/km	51	76
2009	2015	Jaguar XF 3.0 TDV6 240	3.0 L, V6	240 PS (177 kW; 237 hp)	500 N⋅m (369 lb⋅ft)	249 km/h (155 mph) (Limited)	7.1 (6.7)	46.0 mpg_{‑imp} (6.14 L/100 km)	159 g/km	46	
2009	2015	Jaguar XF S 3.0 TDV6 275	3.0 L, V6	275 PS (202 kW; 271 hp)	600 N⋅m (443 lb⋅ft)	249 km/h (155 mph) (Limited)	6.4 (5.9)	46.0 mpg_{‑imp} (6.14 L/100 km)	159 g/km	46	

In 2008, the 4.2-litre supercharged V8 engine was replaced by the new 5.0-litre supercharged V8 engine rated at 470 PS (346 kW; 464 hp), and came with Adaptive Dynamics (computer controlled continuously variable damping) and Active Differential Control (electronically controlled rear differential).

The 2.7-litre V6 diesel engine was replaced in 2009 with a new 3.0-litre V6 diesel engine. The engine is the same as the 3.0-litre TDV6 used in the Land Rover Discovery 4 with the newly used ZF 8 speed automatic transmission. The AJ-V6D Gen III, came in two states of tune. The diesel engines are a product of the joint venture between Ford and Peugeot-Citroën.

=== Transmissions ===
The XF was launched with an automatic gearbox only, and all models initially used the six-speed ZF 6HP26 automatic transmission. For model years 2010–2012, some engines (the 3.0 L diesel and 5.0 L supercharged petrol) used the second generation six-speed ZF 6HP28 transmission. During 2012–2013, 8-speed ZF 8HP70 transmissions replaced the 6-speed transmissions for all engines. The gears can either be selected using a rotary dial that rises from the centre console on start-up or can be manually controlled using paddles behind the steering wheel. AWD is available in both RHD and LHD markets with variances according to consumer demand for engine types. Entry level 2.0-litre diesel models are available in AWD in UK RHD, however petrol AWD models are not available in that market.

== Equipment ==
=== Sound system ===
The standard audio system comprises a ten-speaker, 250 W set-up that includes a radio, CD player, WMA and MP3 compatibility as well as USB storage devices.

From 2008 to 2012, there was an optional Bowers & Wilkins (B&W) sound system available. At its core there are 14 speakers which (with the exception of the aluminium high-frequency tweeters) employ B&W's Kevlar composite speaker cones. Each front door contains a 168 mm (6.6 in) woofer, a 100 mm (3.9 in) mid-range speaker and a 25 mm (1.0 in) dome tweeter (the latter two wired in parallel with a crossover), while each rear door houses a similar 168 mm (6.6 in) woofer and 25 mm (1.0 in) tweeter. As a centre speaker there is a 100 mm (3.9 in) full-range driver, similar to the two 100 mm (3.9 in) full-range 'surround' speakers located on the rear parcel shelf. The B&W system has been reviewed by journalists at Autocar magazine, who proclaimed it the best in-car system they have ever heard.

For 2013 models, Jaguar introduced the option of a new Meridian sound system upgrade instead of B&W; with a choice of 380 W 11-speaker or an 825 W surround sound 17-speaker system.

=== Multimedia interaction ===
A 7-inch full-colour screen is fitted to the dashboard of all XFs and can be used to control most multimedia systems. The same screen can also be upgraded with analogue and digital television capability. Available as an option is JaguarVoice which allows the driver to speak commands to control everything from the sound and navigation systems to telephone calls and the climate control system.

== Safety ==
The XF was crash tested in 2010 by Euro NCAP and it gained a four star rating. The XF's result was seen as a disappointment by some car magazines. When retested in 2011, the XF showed improved scores in adult occupant, child occupant and pedestrian areas.

Jaguar XF
Euro NCAP 2010

Test	Points	%
Overall	4/5 stars	–
Adult Occupant	28	78%
Child Occupant	32	65%
Pedestrian Impact	16	43%
Safety Assist	5	71%

Jaguar XF
Euro NCAP 2011

Test	Points	%
Overall	4/5 stars	–
Adult Occupant	28	79%
Child Occupant	36	73%
Pedestrian Impact	22	62%
Safety Assist	5	71%

The Australasian New Car Assessment Program (ANCAP) also tested the XF and gave it a score of 32.38 points out of 37, giving it an ANCAP rating of 4 out of 5.

ANCAP test results* Jaguar XF (2011)
Test	Score
Overall	4 /5 stars
Frontal offset	12.38/16
Side impact	16/16
Pole	2/2
Seat belt reminders	2/3
Whiplash protection	Good
Pedestrian protection	Marginal
Electronic stability control	Standard

Thatcham's New Car Whiplash Ratings awarded the XF 'good' score for Geometric, Dynamic and Overall ratings.

== Security ==
Deadlocks, an alarm and an engine immobiliser are fitted as standard to the XF. The car also locks itself when it reaches a pre-set speed to help protect against carjackings. The XF was tested by Thatcham's New Vehicle Security Ratings (NVSR) organisation and achieved the following ratings:

NVSR	Rating
Theft of car:	5/5 stars
Theft from car:	4/5 stars

== Speed record ==
On 7 November 2008, a modified XFR was driven by Paul Gentilozzi of Rocketsports, who drove the car to a new Jaguar record of 225.675 mph (363.189 km/h) on the Bonneville Salt Flats. The new record beat the previous Jaguar record of 217.1 mph (349.4 km/h) in an XJ220 in 1992. Changes to the stock vehicle included low-mounted rear spoiler, increased power to 510 PS (375 kW; 503 hp) by a remapped ECU, a modified air intake and exhaust system and revised supercharger settings.

== Police car ==
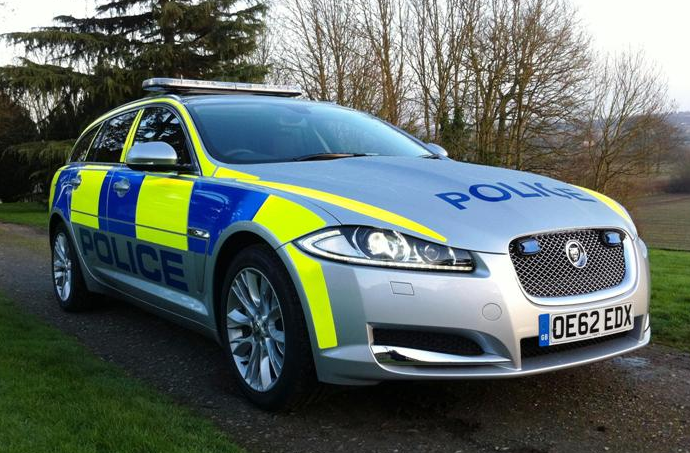
Jaguar XF Sportbrake police car

A special version of the XF Diesel S was announced in 2009 for the UK police car market, with the first police force orders in 2010. Its emergency vehicle equipment included a roof-mounted light bar with 3,600 light elements, side alley lights, blue and white strobing LEDs in the grille and blue flashing LEDs along the side of the car, blue and red flashing LED lights in the rear light clusters.

== Worldwide sales ==
Total sales do not include years 2007 and 2008.

Year	2009	2010	2011	2012	2013	2014	2015	2016	Total
Units sold	30,906	34,368	30,646	34,693	47,391	48,375	35,675	36,544	202,678

== Awards ==
- The concept C-XF was awarded 2007 North American Production Preview Vehicle of the Year award.
- What Diesel? magazine awarded the XF both the Car of the Year and Best Executive Car awards in 2008.
- In 2009, What Diesel? magazine, for the second year running, awarded the XF both the Car of the Year and Best Executive Car awards.
- The XF won the What Car? Best Executive Car category again in 2009,
- The XF won the What Car? Best Executive Car award for the third time in 2010.
- For the fourth successive year, the XF won the What Car? Best Executive Car award in 2011.
- In August 2011, the XF was awarded Car of the Decade by Auto Express.
- In November 2016, the XF was awarded Best Saloon by Golden Steering Wheel Awards.
