= Jaguar XF (X260) =

Second generation of Jaguar XF

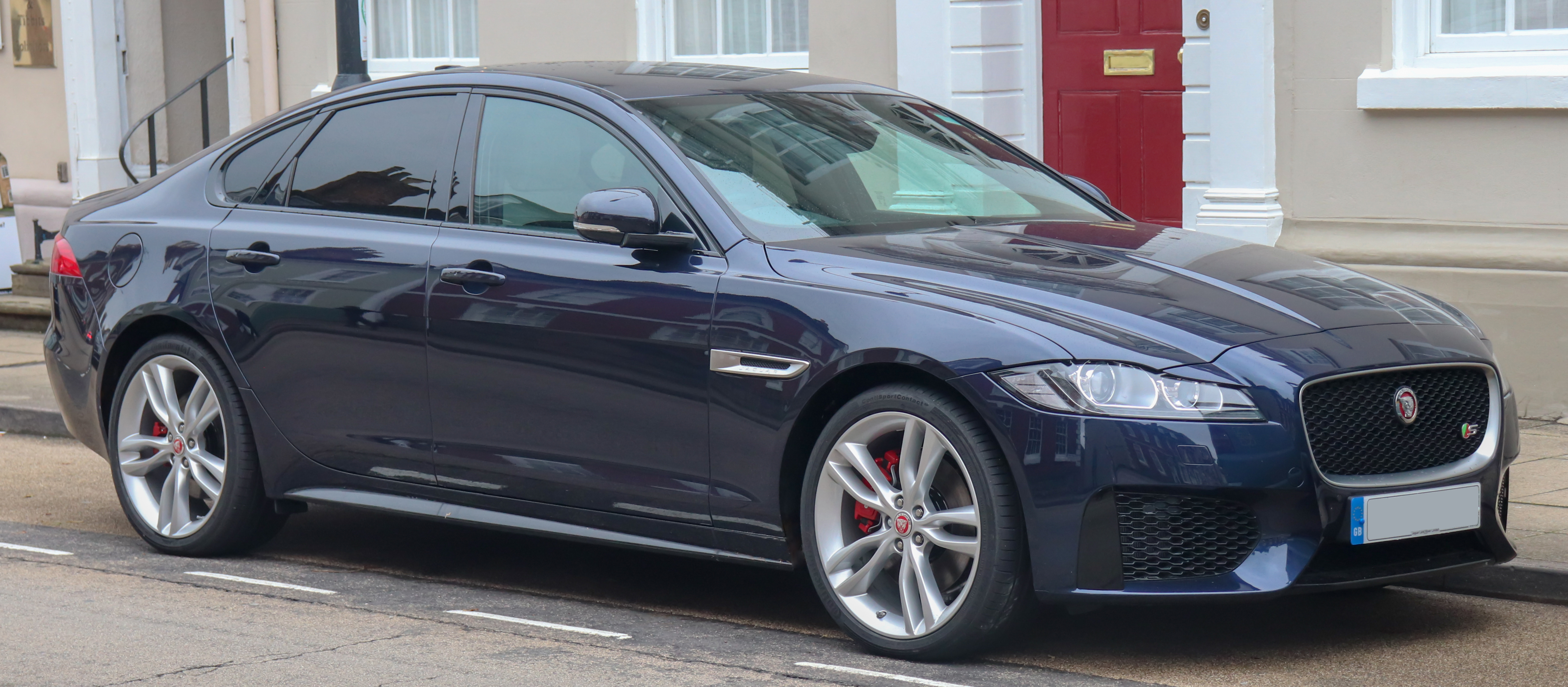

Overview
- Manufacturer: Jaguar Land Rover
- Model code: X260
- Also called: Jaguar XFL (China)
- Production: 2015–2024
- Assembly: United Kingdom: Birmingham (Castle Bromwich Assembly); China: Changshu (Chery JLR); India: Pune (JLR India)
- Designer: Ian Callum

Body and chassis
- Class: Executive car (E)
- Body style: 4-door saloon; 5-door estate
- Layout: Front-engine, rear-wheel-drive; Front-engine, all-wheel-drive
- Platform: JLR D7a
- Related: Jaguar XE (X760); Jaguar F-Pace; Range Rover Velar

Powertrain
- Engine: Petrol: 2.0-litre Ingenium turbo I4; 3.0-litre supercharged Jaguar AJ126 V6; Diesel: 2.0-litre Ingenium Turbodiesel I4; 3.0-litre AJD Turbodiesel V6
- Transmission: 8-speed ZF 8HP45/ZF 8HP70 automatic; 6-speed ZF 6S-45 manual
- Hybrid drivetrain: Mild Hybrid

Dimensions
- Wheelbase: 2,960 mm (116.5 in); 3,100 mm (122.0 in) (XFL)
- Length: 4,969 mm (195.6 in); 5,130 mm (202.0 in) (XFL)
- Width: 1,880 mm (74.0 in)
- Height: 1,457 mm (57.4 in); 1,491 mm (58.7 in) (XFL)
- Kerb weight: 1,545–1,855 kg (3,406–4,090 lb)

Chronology
- Predecessor: Jaguar XF (X250)

The Jaguar XF (X260) is an executive/mid-size luxury sports saloon manufactured and marketed under the Jaguar marque of Jaguar Land Rover from 2015 to 2024, in saloon and estate body styles. Following the first generation steel-bodied X250 XF introduced in 2007, the second-generation XF sedan/saloon debuted at the 2015 New York International Auto Show, noted for its aluminium bodywork.

In 2020, the XF received a facelift that mostly improved the XF's interior. As of 2022, the XF Sportbrake has been downgraded to compete in the D-segment while retaining its E-segment exterior dimensions.

Production of the XF ceased in mid-2024.

== Overview ==
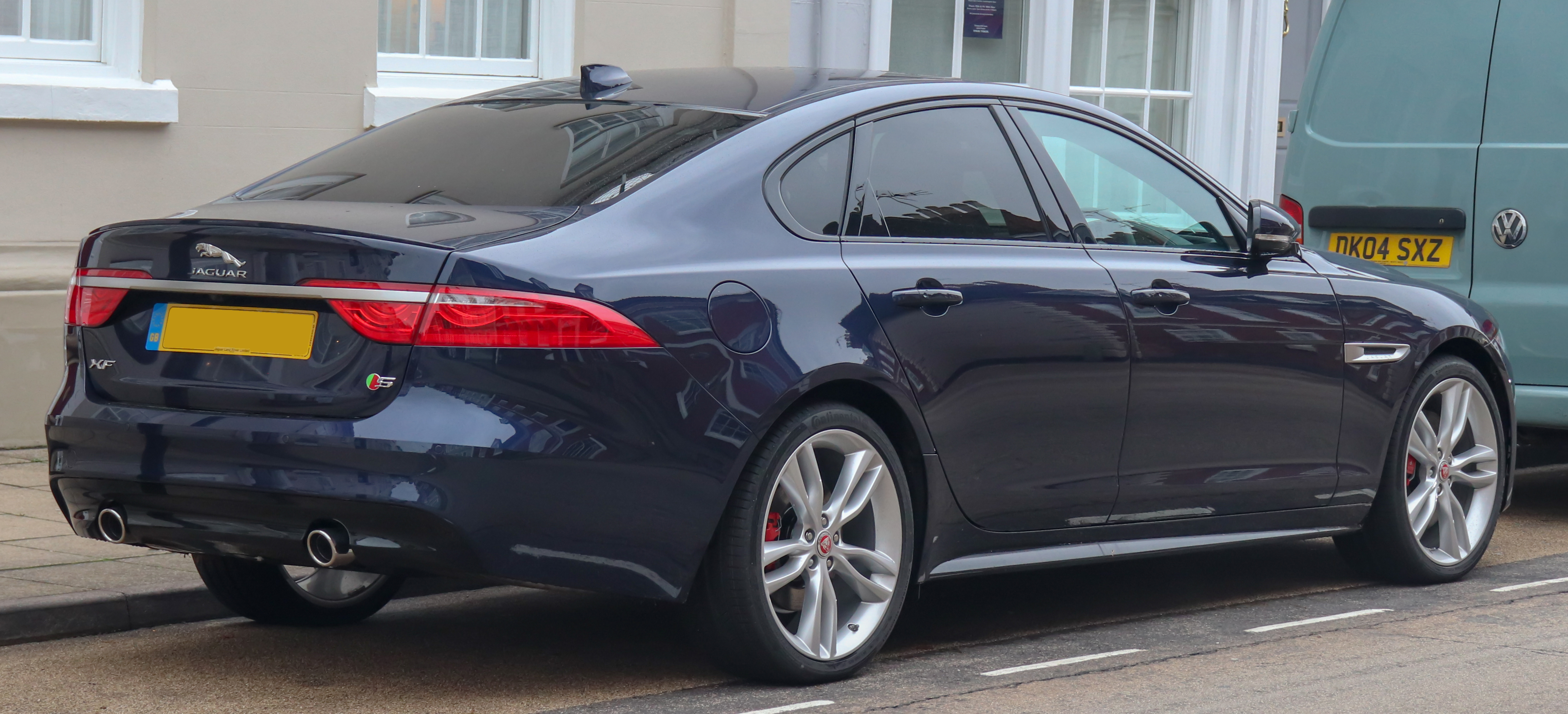
Saloon

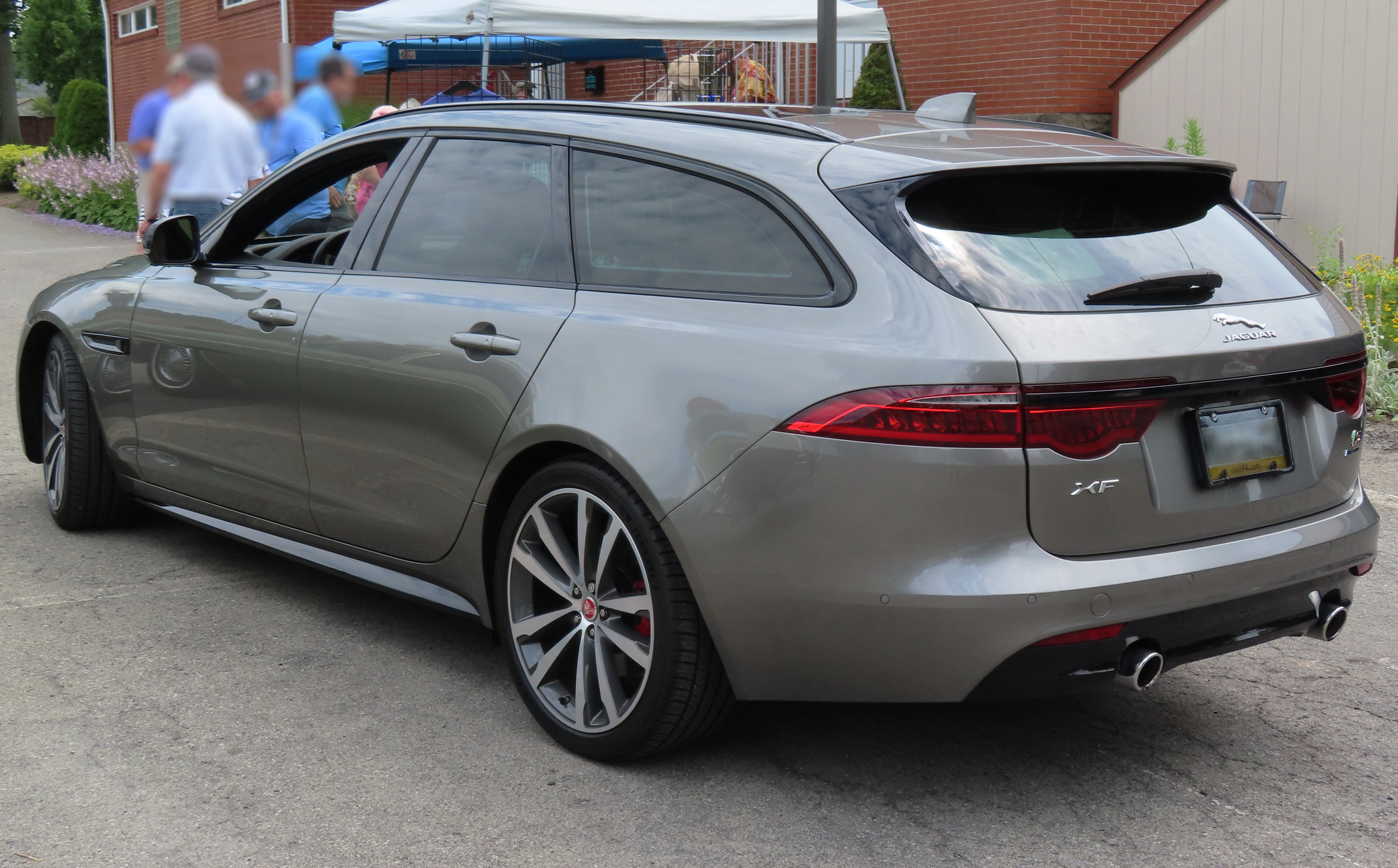
Sportbrake

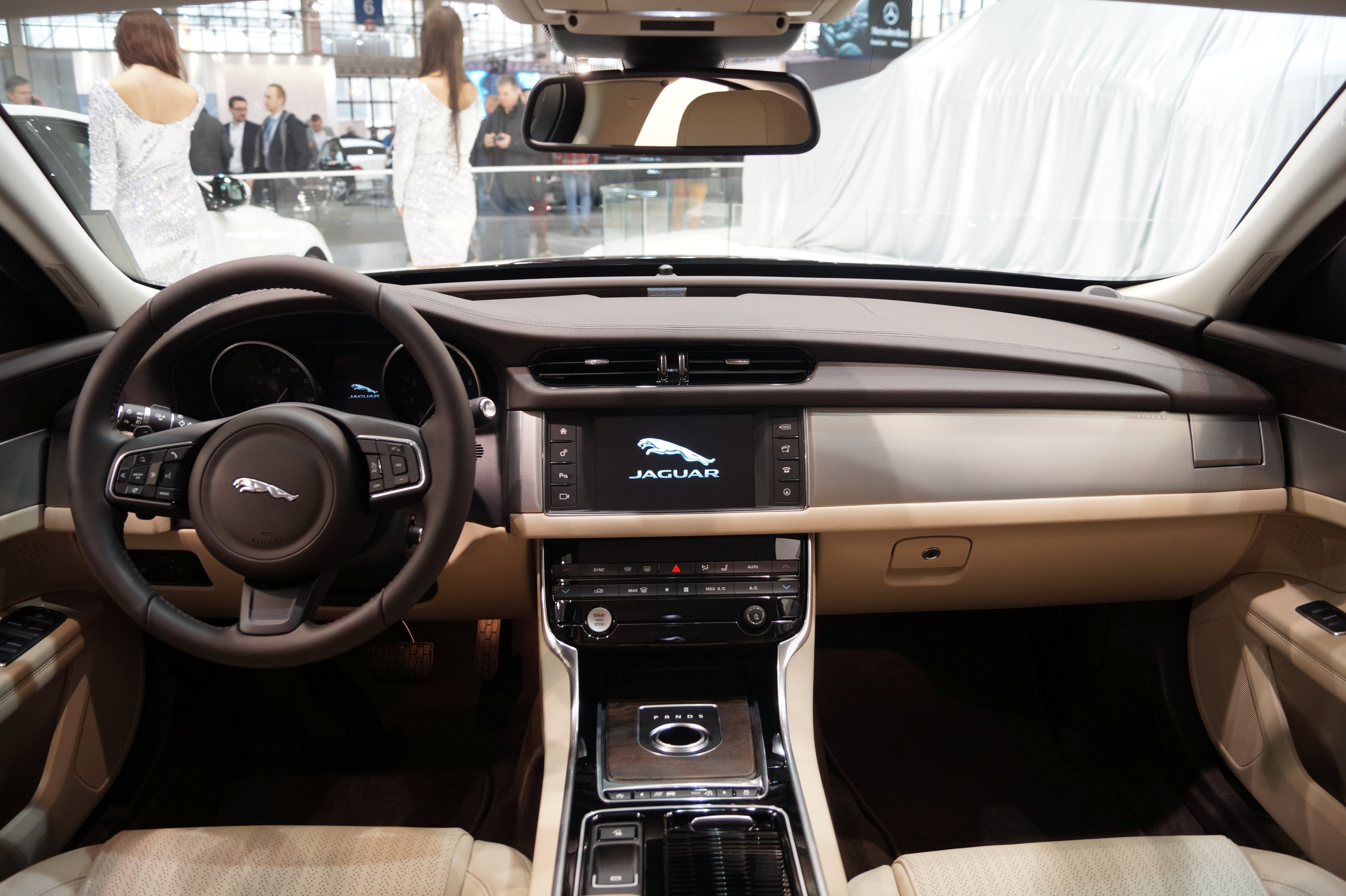
Interior

The XF is an evolution of the original J-Blade design pioneered in the X250 XF, with a largely similar silhouette. Effort was made to build a uniform design language across Jaguar's saloon range.

The X260 XF uses 83 percent all-new parts compared with the previous model. The car is 7 millimetres (0.3 inches) shorter than the predecessor. Bodywork uses aluminium as the primary component of the body structure and chassis; the XF's bodyside panel is a single aluminium pressing.

The chassis featured a fully independent suspension, including multiple "modes" in the S model providing either maximum comfort, maximum performance, or a setting in between. The standard model in the US featured a P250 247 HP Ingenium engine. Optional power included the P300 296 HP turbo 4 and the P380 380 HP supercharged V6 for the performance-oriented S model. Diesel engines, while available in other markets, were not available to customers in the US.

The Sportbrake was introduced for sale in the US in 2018 where it was positioned as a competitor for other high performance estate cars. It was initially available only in S trim for North America, with the high performance F-Type 3.0L supercharged 380 HP engine and all wheel drive. The XF S in sportbrake trim was able to accelerate from 0-60 mph (97 km/h) in 4.9 seconds.

== Chinese and Indian models ==
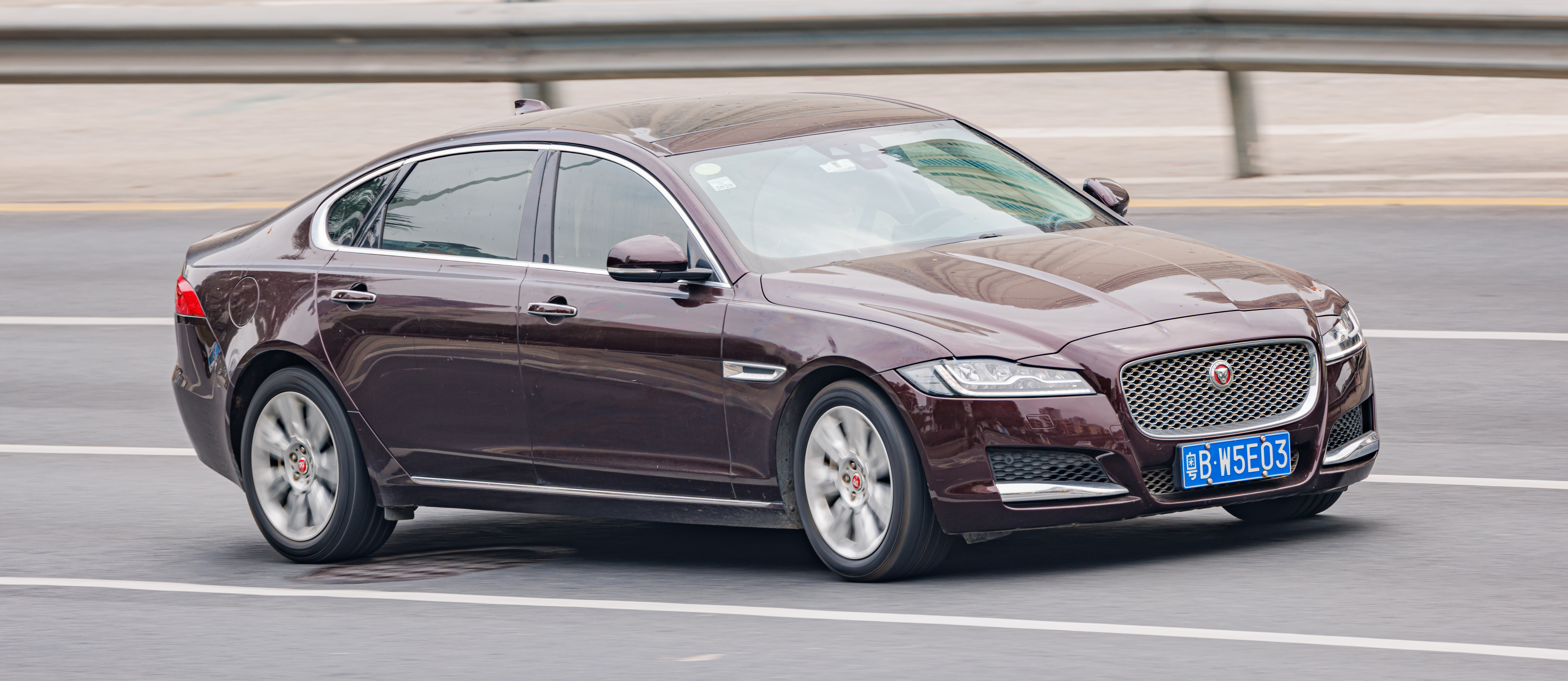
Jaguar XF long-wheelbase version (pre-facelift)

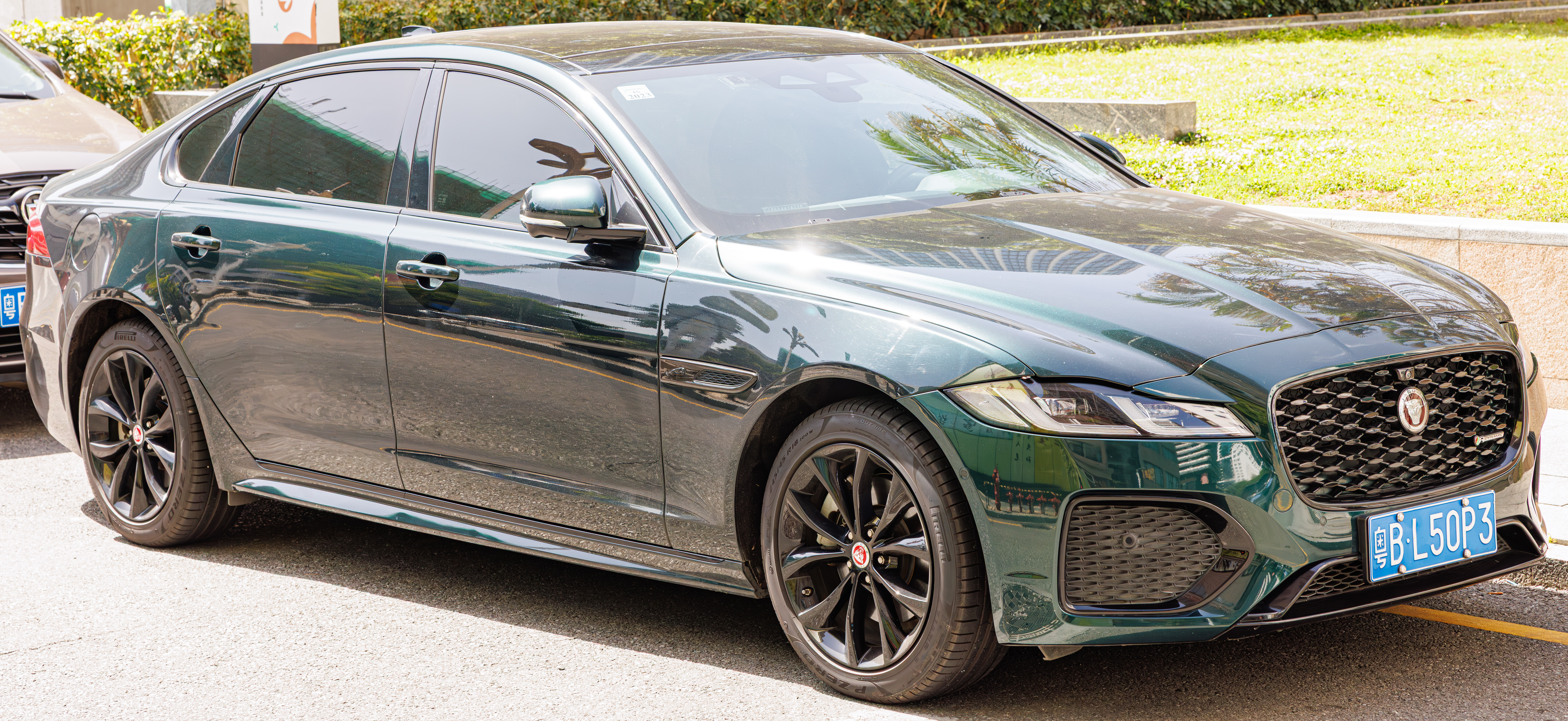
Jaguar XF long-wheelbase version (facelift; front view)

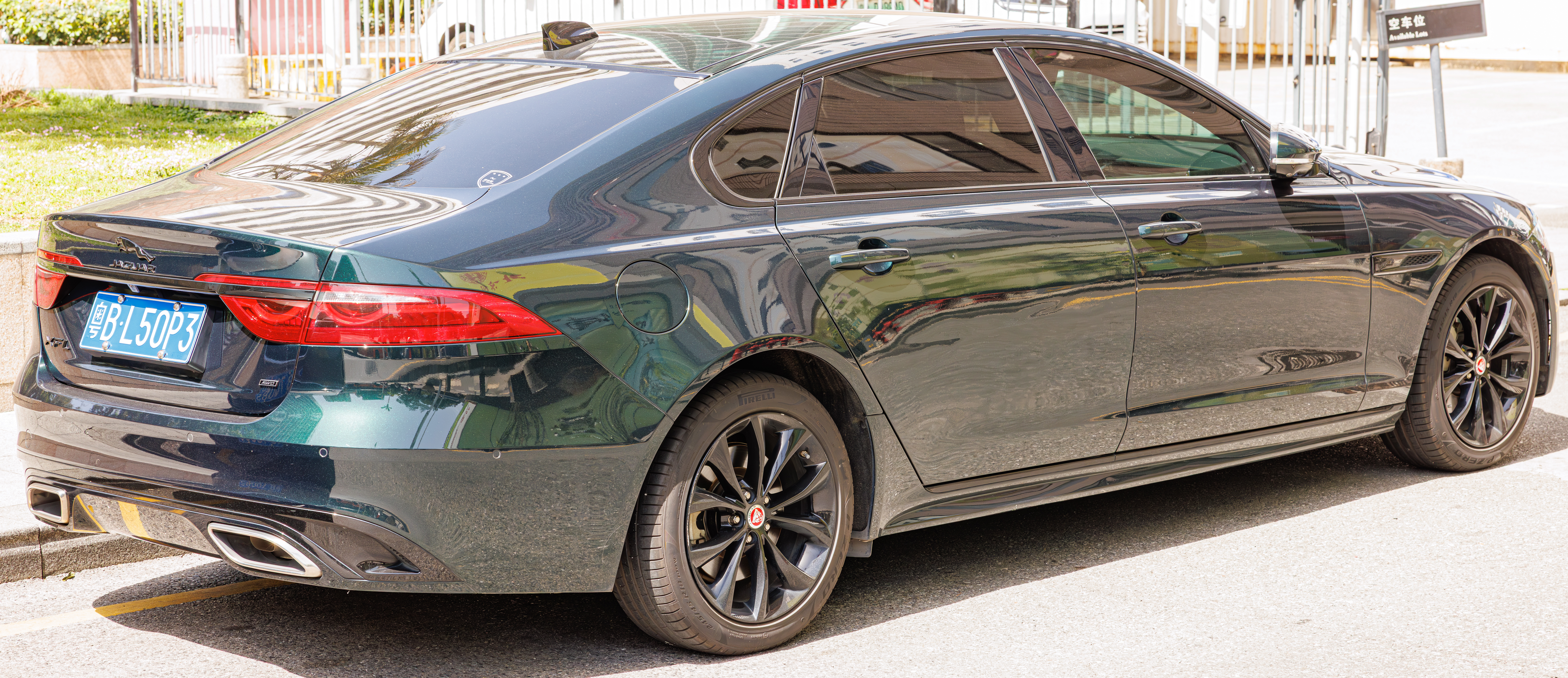
Jaguar XF long-wheelbase version (facelift; rear view)

A long-wheelbase version debuted at the 2016 Beijing Motor Show, with 140 mm (5.5 in) added to the wheelbase giving rear passengers 157 mm (6.2 in) more legroom and 116 mm (4.6 in) more kneeroom. As the car is designed for chauffeur-driven use, standard equipment includes folding tables, massaging seats, electric window blinds, and eight-inch screens integrated into the back of the front-seat headrests.

It is the first aluminium-bodied car built in China with the debut of some new features, with Clear Exit Detection warning passengers of opening the doors into traffic approaching from behind. The XFL comes with a new cabin air ionisation technology to make the air inside the car more comfortable. For the driver, the InControl Touch Pro infotainment system with its 10.2-inch touchscreen works alongside a configurable 12.3-inch digital instrument cluster which works together with a 17-speaker, 825-watt Meridian Surround Sound System. Rear passengers have access to a wide array of buttons as well as to 2 HDMI ports, 2 USB 3.0 ports, and a 12V power socket.

The 2.0-litre I4 engine is offered in 197–236 hp (147–176 kW; 200–239 PS) power output configurations and a 335 hp (250 kW; 340 PS) 3.0-litre supercharged V6 engine is also offered as the ultimate engine option, with all versions coming with an automatic transmission. The long wheelbase models come with four-wheel-drive only. Due to the long wheelbase and added features, the XFL weighs 200 kg (441 lb) more than the standard XF.

On 22 September 2016, the Jaguar XF was launched in India for Rs. 4,750,000 onwards. The engines offered for the Indian market include the 2.0-litre Ingenium petrol and diesel I4 engines. The XF is assembled in India from complete knock-down kits alongside the XE and F-Pace.

== Engine specifications ==
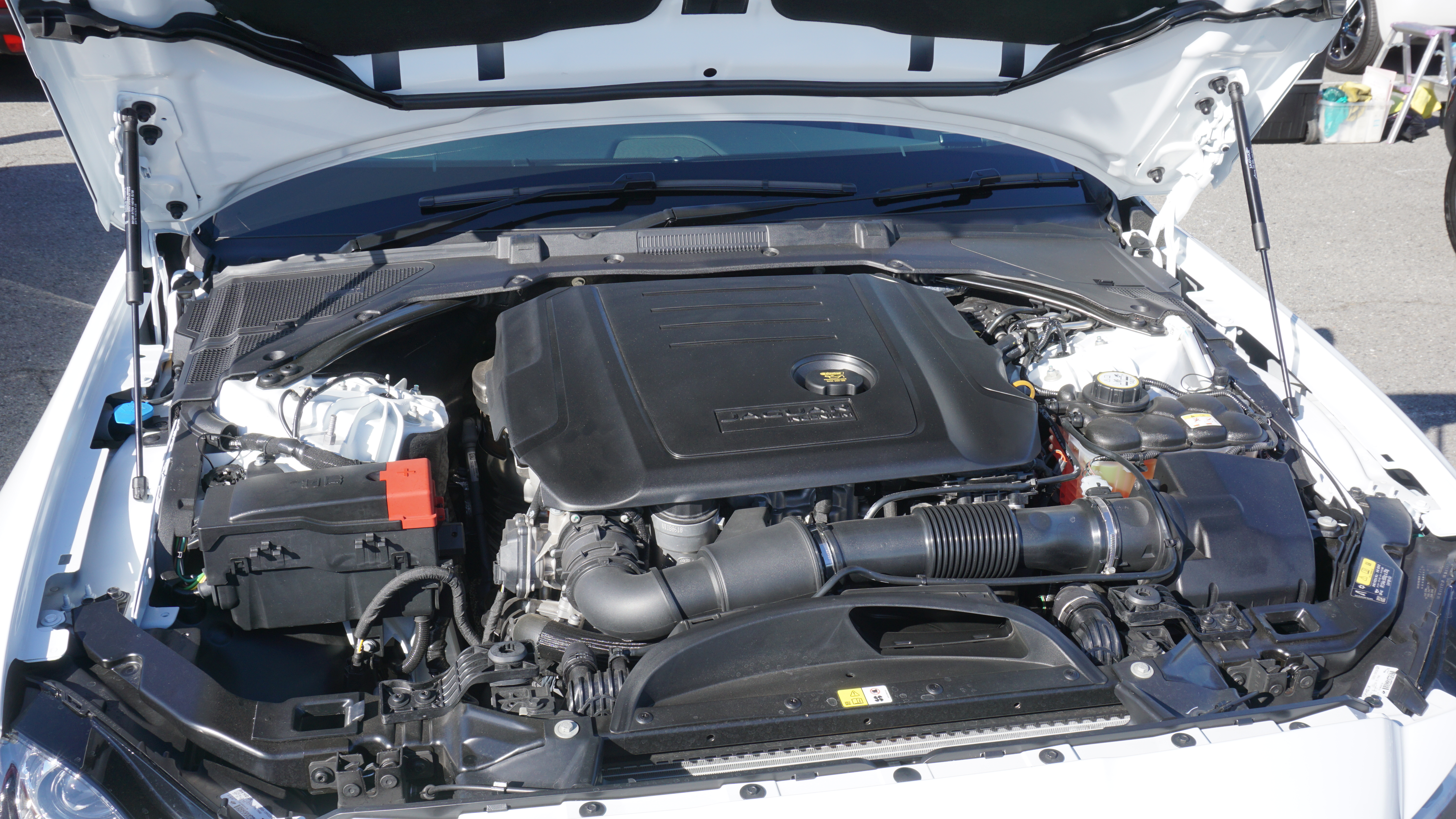
XF Prestige 20d's Ingenium 2.0 litre 4 cylinder turbocharged diesel engine

A manual transmission was introduced for the first time in the second generation of Jaguar XF. Previously, there was only an automatic transmission available.

In late 2020, mild hybrid options were announced, as modifications to the Ingenium 2.0L engines with an additional 48 Volt belt alternator starter system.

	E-Performance 163	20d 180	25d 240	30d 300	25t 250	30t 300
Engine specifications
Internal codename	JLR AJ20D Ingenium			JLR AJ-V6D	JLR AJ20P Ingenium	
Motortype	I4 diesel			V6 diesel	I4 petrol	
Fuel injection	Common-rail diesel injection				Direct fuel injection	
Turbocharger	Single turbo		Twin turbo		Single turbo	
Displacement	1,999 cc (1.999 L; 122.0 cu in)			2,993 cc (2.993 L; 182.6 cu in)	1,997 cc (1.997 L; 121.9 cu in)	
Power	120 kW (163 PS; 161 hp) at 4,000 rpm	132 kW (179 PS; 177 hp) at 4,000 rpm	177 kW (241 PS; 237 hp) at 4,000 rpm	221 kW (300 PS; 296 hp) at 4,000 rpm	184 kW (250 PS; 247 hp) at 5,500 rpm	221 kW (300 PS; 296 hp) at 5,500 rpm
Torque	380 N⋅m (280 lbf⋅ft) at 1,750-2,500 rpm	430 N⋅m (317 lbf⋅ft) at 1,750-2,500 rpm	500 N⋅m (369 lbf⋅ft) at 1,500 rpm	700 N⋅m (516 lbf⋅ft) at 1,500-1,750 rpm	365 N⋅m (269 lbf⋅ft) at 1,300-4,500 rpm	400 N⋅m (295 lbf⋅ft) at 1,500-4,000 rpm
Drivetrain
Drive layout	Front-engine, rear-wheel-drive	Front-engine, rear-wheel-drive or all-wheel-drive	Front-engine, all-wheel-drive	Front-engine, rear-wheel-drive		Front-engine, all-wheel-drive
Transmission	6-speed manual transmission (ZF S6-45) or 8-speed automatic transmission (ZF 8HP45) (optional)		8-speed automatic transmission (ZF 8HP45)	8-speed automatic transmission (ZF 8HP70)	8-speed automatic transmission (ZF 8HP45)	
Performance
Top speed	212 km/h (132 mph)	219 km/h (136 mph)	246 [241] km/h (153 [150] mph)	250 km/h (160 mph)	244 [241] km/h (152 [150] mph)	250 km/h (160 mph)
Acceleration 0–100 km/h (0-62 mph) (seconds)	9.8/9.1 [10/9.3]	9.2/8.4 [8.5]	6.9 [7.0]	6.4 [6.6]	6.7 [6.9]	5.9 [6.0]
Average fuel consumption per 100 km (WLTP)	4.9/5.3 L [5.2/5.4 L]	5.0/5.2/5.6 L [5.4/5.7 L]	5.9 L [6.1 L]	5.9-6.1 L [6.1-6.2 L]	7.3 L [7.5 L]	7.5-7.7 L [7.6-7.8 L]
EU emission standard	Euro 6d-TEMP					

Figures in square brackets are the specifications of the Jaguar XF Sportbrake.

== Safety ==
Euro NCAP test results Jaguar XF Saloon (2015)
Test	Points	%
Overall:	5 /5 stars	
Adult occupant:	35.0	92%
Child occupant:	41.2	84%
Pedestrian:	29.1	80%
Safety assist:	10.8	83%

ANCAP test results Jaguar XF (2015, aligned with Euro NCAP)
Test	Points	%
Overall:	5 /5 stars	
Adult occupant:	36	94%
Child occupant:	41.2	84%
Pedestrian:	29.1	80%
Safety assist:	10.8	83%

== Sales ==
Sales are measured using financial year worldwide wholesale totals. Total sales does not include FY 2024 Chery Jaguar Land Rover sales.

Year	2015	2016	2017	2018	2019	2020	2021	2022	2023	2024	Total
Units sold	45,921	36,197	35,024	41,627	24,469	12,637	9,601	10,861	11,067	3,512	230,916

XFL
Year	China
2023	11,165
2024	9,087
2025	7,291
