= Range Rover (L322) =

Land Rover Range Rover (L322)
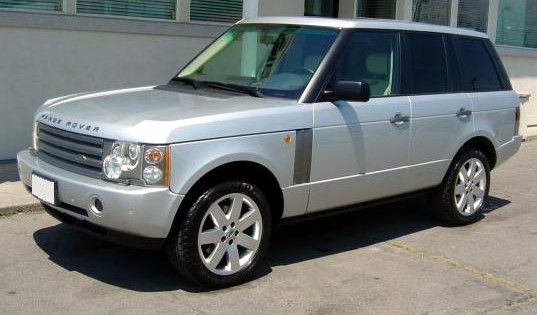
- Land Rover Range Rover HSE

Overview
- Manufacturer: Land Rover
- Model code: L322
- Production: 2001–2012; 293,494 produced
- Model years: 2002–2012
- Assembly: United Kingdom: Solihull (Solihull plant)
- Designer: Phil Simmons (1997); Wolfgang Reitzle (1998)

Body and chassis
- Class: Full-size luxury 4x4
- Body style: 5-door off-road vehicle
- Layout: Front engine / four-wheel drive

Powertrain
- Engine: Petrol; 4.2 L AJ34S S/C V8 (2005–2009); 4.4 L BMW M62TUB44 V8 (2002–2005); 4.4 L AJ41 V8 (2005–2009); 5.0 L AJ133S S/C V8 (2009–2012); Diesel; 2.9 L BMW M57 I6 (2002–2006); 3.6 L AJD V8 (2007–2010); 4.4 L AJD V8 (2010–2012)
- Transmission: Automatic; 5-speed GM 5L40-E (TD6 only) (2002–2005); 5-speed ZF 5HP (V8 only) (2002–2005); 6-speed ZF 6HP (2006–2012); 8-speed ZF 8HP (2010–2012)

Dimensions
- Wheelbase: 2,880 mm (113.4 in)
- Length: 4,950 mm (194.9 in) (2002–2005) 4,971 mm (195.7 in) (2005–2009) 4,976 mm (195.9 in) (2009–2012)
- Width: 1,923 mm (75.7 in) (2002–2009); 2,035 mm (80.1 in) (2009–2012)
- Height: 1,862 mm (73.3 in) (2002–2005) 1,902 mm (74.9 in) (2005–2009) 1,877 mm (73.9 in) (2009–2012)

Chronology
- Predecessor: Range Rover (P38A)
- Successor: Range Rover (L405)

The Range Rover (L322) is the third-generation Range Rover from British carmaker Land Rover, produced from 2001 through 2012. Contrary to its forebears, it is the first Range Rover with a unitary body structure (more commonly known as a monocoque even though the common motor cars never truly utilize the aforementioned structure) and it switched to all around independent suspension instead of front and rear rigid, live axles. Just like its predecessor, it grew in size, and styling became more butch.

The L322 was originally planned and developed as the 'L30', under BMW ownership. The vehicle was intended to share components and systems (electronics, core power units etc.) with the BMW 7 Series (E38). However, BMW sold Land Rover to Ford, two years before the L322 went into production.

In the UK and many other territories, ascending trim levels were initially marketed as "SE", "HSE" and "Vogue". Various other trims such as "Vogue SE", "Westminster", "Autobiography" and special editions were subsequently produced.

In his Sunday Times column, Jeremy Clarkson once went on record to state that he owned a Range Rover TDV8 Vogue and it was "the best car in the world and best 4x4." As of 2025, he still owns and operates a car matching this description, and it primarily serves on his farm in Chipping Norton.

The L322's successor, the L405, was announced in August 2012 and unveiled the same year at the Paris Motor Show.

== Overview ==
The previous generation P38 Range Rover (or "Pegasus") had been developed whilst the Rover Group was owned by British Aerospace, and budgetary constraints during the development had been extremely tight. There was also press criticism of the P38A that its styling lacked the "presence" of the original 1970 Range Rover. When the Rover Group was taken over by BMW shortly after the P38A's launch in 1994, the newly installed BMW management at Land Rover quickly concluded that the car would not have a long shelf life compared to its predecessor, due to its fundamentally dated underpinnings, and cancelled the planned '99 Model Year' updates. A proposed replacement for the Discovery was postponed and development of an all-new Range Rover, codenamed L322, took priority.

The initial codename for the project was L30, in line with the then system of Lxx for Land Rover projects, such as Freelander (L20) and Discovery Series 2 (L25).

The L30 project was a joint one involving engineers from both Rover Group and BMW and was initially based at BMW's FIZ Engineering Centre in Munich before transferring to Land Rover's Solihull plant for the final stages prior to volume production. Munich was chosen to house the team as Rover's Gaydon engineering facility was already working on the new Mini (R50) project as well as other MG, Rover and Land Rover projects and did not have enough space for another large engineering team to be based there.

The sale of Land Rover by BMW to Ford occurred just before the move to Solihull and the contract included a clause which continued BMW's involvement until after the car had entered volume production.

The switch to Lxxx codenames occurred after the sale to Ford with L30 being renamed L322 at the top of a model line-up of Range Rover Sport (L320) Land Rover Discovery (Discovery 3 L319), Land Rover Defender (L316) and Freelander (L314).

The third-generation Range Rover was designed to accommodate BMW's M62 V8 engines for future models. The manual transmission was dropped entirely, leaving only the automatic transmission. The BMW 7 Series E38 electronics system were being phased out during the development of the third-generation Range Rover, and being replaced with the electronics from the BMW E39 5 Series. The entertainment system (Radio Function, Navigation System, Television and Telecommunications systems, as well as the automotive computer bus system) on pre-facelift models were almost identical to those in the BMW E39 5 Series. Early models of the third-generation model Range Rover could be upgraded with some newer BMW technologies, although from 2005 onwards the electronics were based on Ford/Jaguar systems.

== Initial release ==
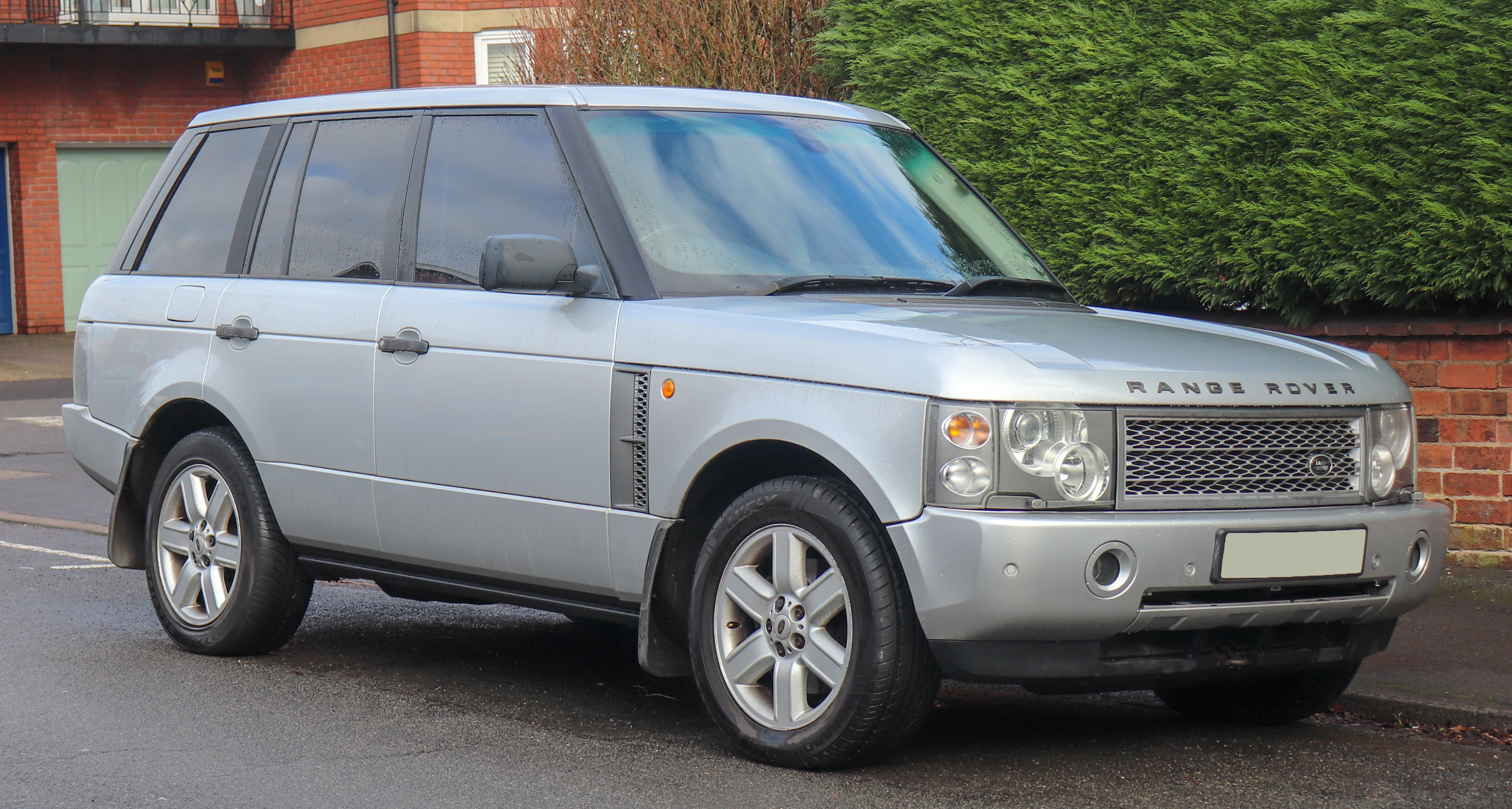
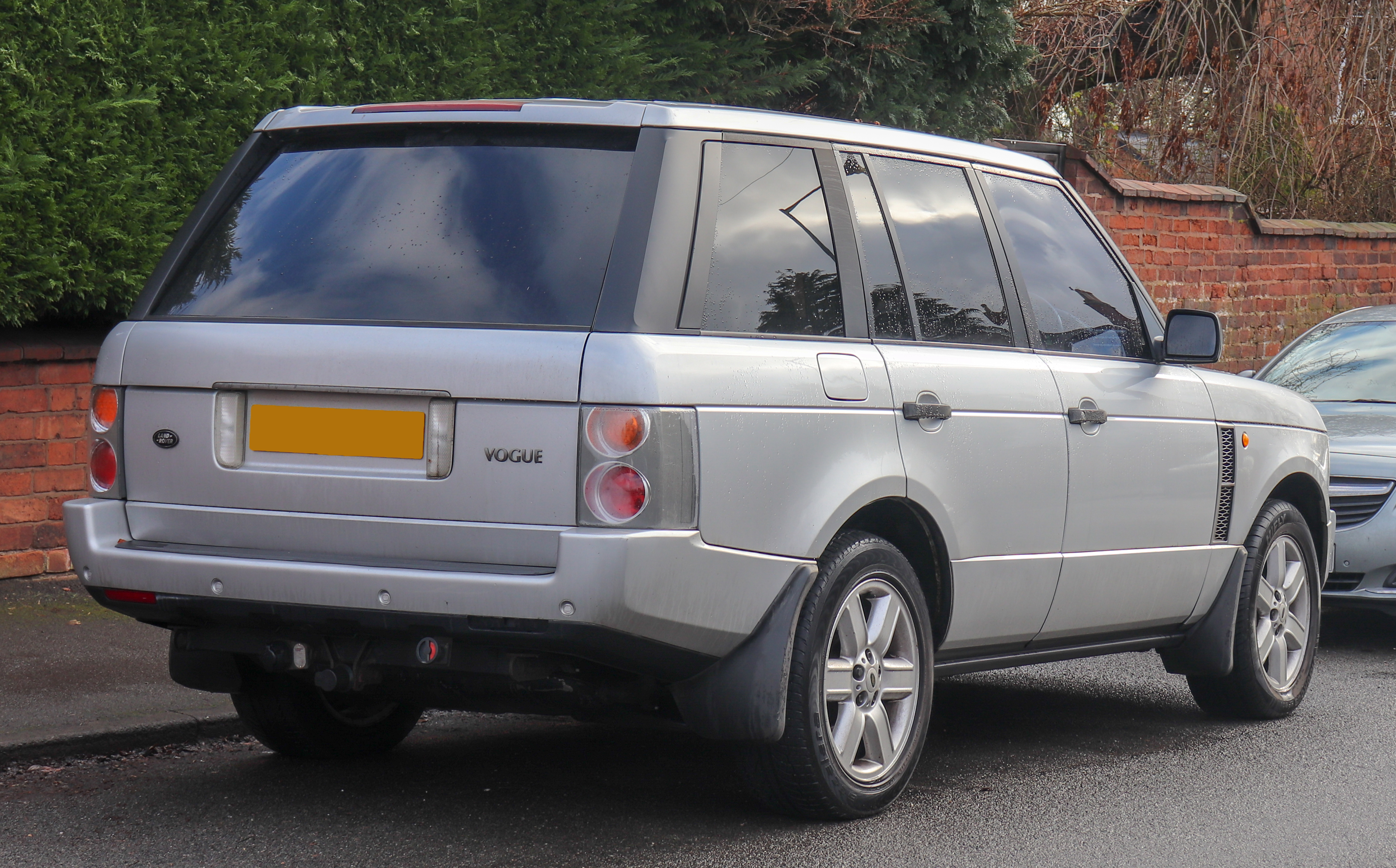
Pre-facelift 2002–2005 Land Rover Range Rover

The design has a monocoque (unibody) construction with four-wheel independent air suspension. Air suspension allowed variable ride height and achieved similar axle articulation to the previous live axle design. This retained off-road abilities while improving on-road performance. The new Range Rover's introduction in early 2002 as a 2003 model for the North American market resulted in the Range Rover, Mitsubishi Montero and Ford Expedition (also new for 2003) being the only three SUVs in the full-size sport utility class with four-wheel independent suspension systems at that time.

Early US-specification Range Rover included air conditioning with tri-zone climate controls with interior air filter, power tilt/telescopic leather-wrapped steering wheel with radio controls, cruise control, memory system, leather upholstered twelve-way power driver seats, ten-way power passenger seat, power sunroof, a premium sound system with six-disc CD changer, navigation system with voice activation, rearview camera, wireless mobile phone link, universal garage door opener, and outside-temperature indicator. Options included 14-way power heated/cooled front seats, DVD entertainment system, and upgraded leather upholstery.

== 2006 ==
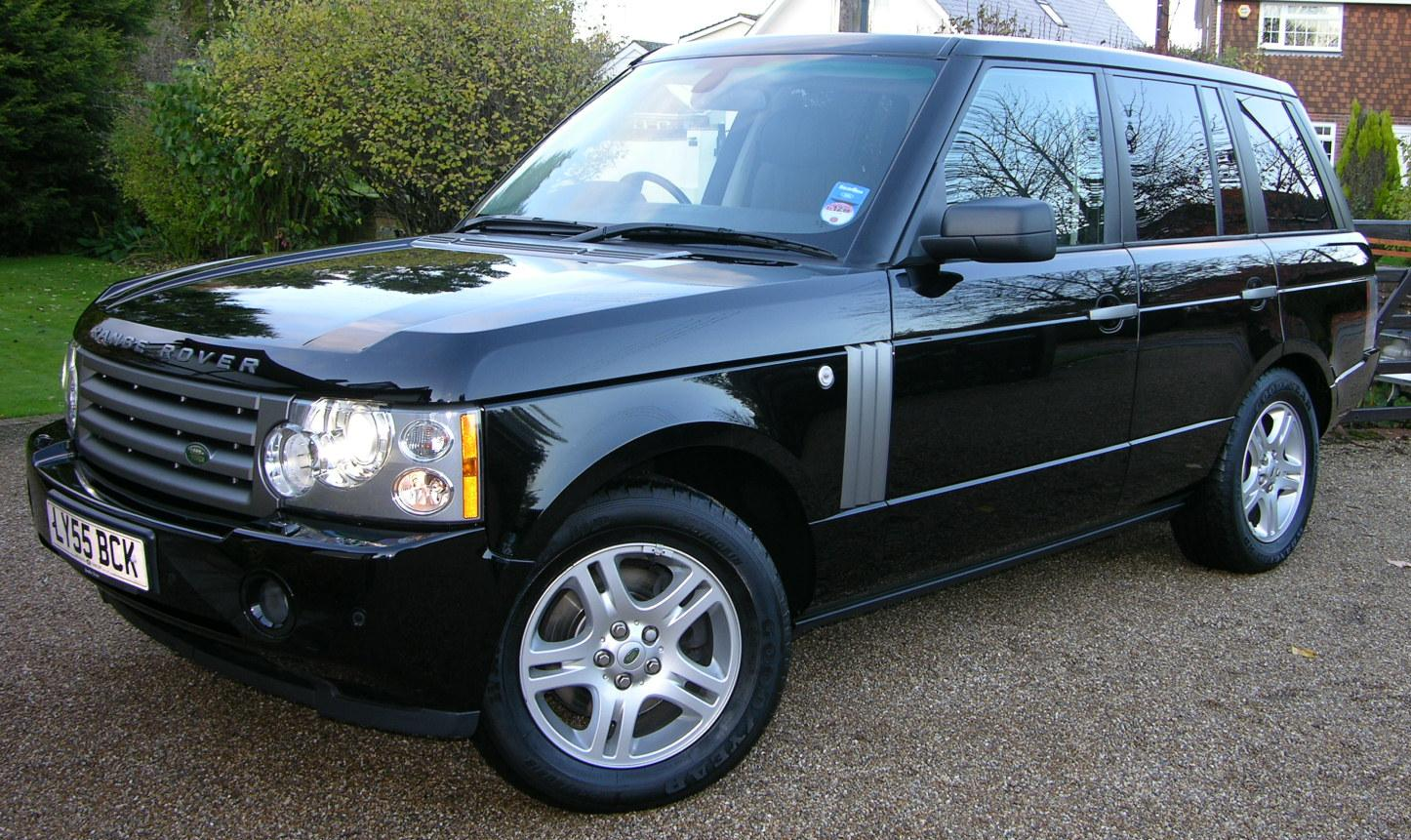
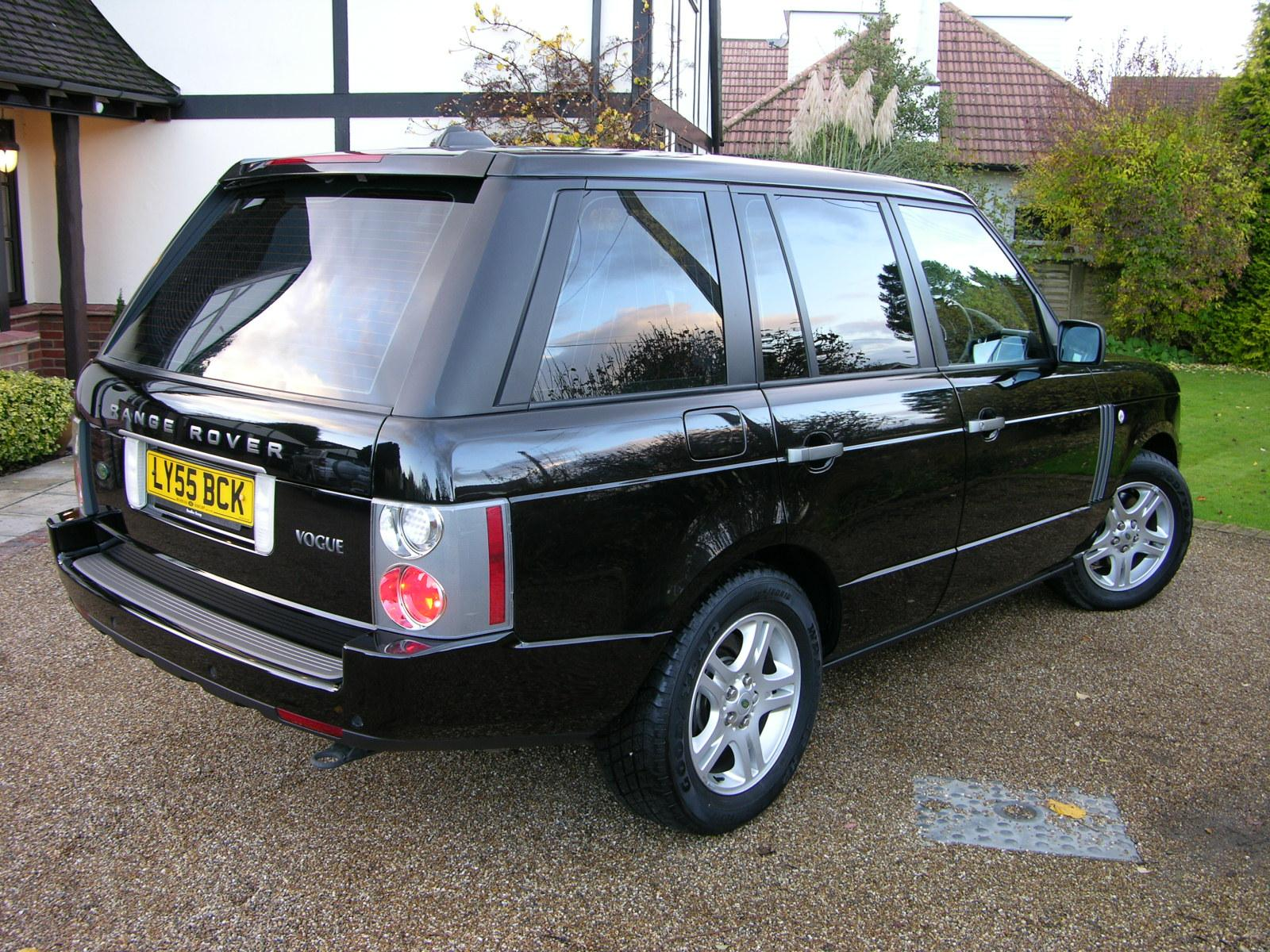
2006 Land Rover Range Rover

The Range Rover's exterior was updated in 2005 for the 2006 model year along with the BMW V8 being replaced with a Jaguar unit (some cars registered in 2005 have the new Jaguar engines). The new engine choices were Jaguar's AJ-V8, with 4.4-litre 300 hp (220 kW) or 4.2-litre 400 hp (300 kW) supercharged variants. The engines are aluminium alloy units, with advanced torque-based engine management system, drive-by-wire throttle control, and variable camshaft phasing (on the 4.4-litre version). This new Range Rover was officially presented at the 2005 North American International Auto Show and released shortly afterwards.

From the diesel engine of the 2006 model (at this time still the BMW six-cylinder unit) to the supercharged V8, the car could reach 60 mph (97 km/h) from 14.8 seconds or as little as 6.5 seconds and has a top speed from 110 mph (180 km/h) to approximately 130 mph (210 km/h) (governed), respectively.

In addition to the engine change, the 2006 Range Rover is equipped with an updated "infotainment" system. This includes a touch screen with on and off-road navigation, radio, CD, Satellite Radio (US), telephone, rear view camera, a wireless video camera system and other additional features all accessed via the same user interface. The audio system is Harman Kardon Logic 7 surround sound. Also available is a DVD rear seat entertainment which is fully integrated.

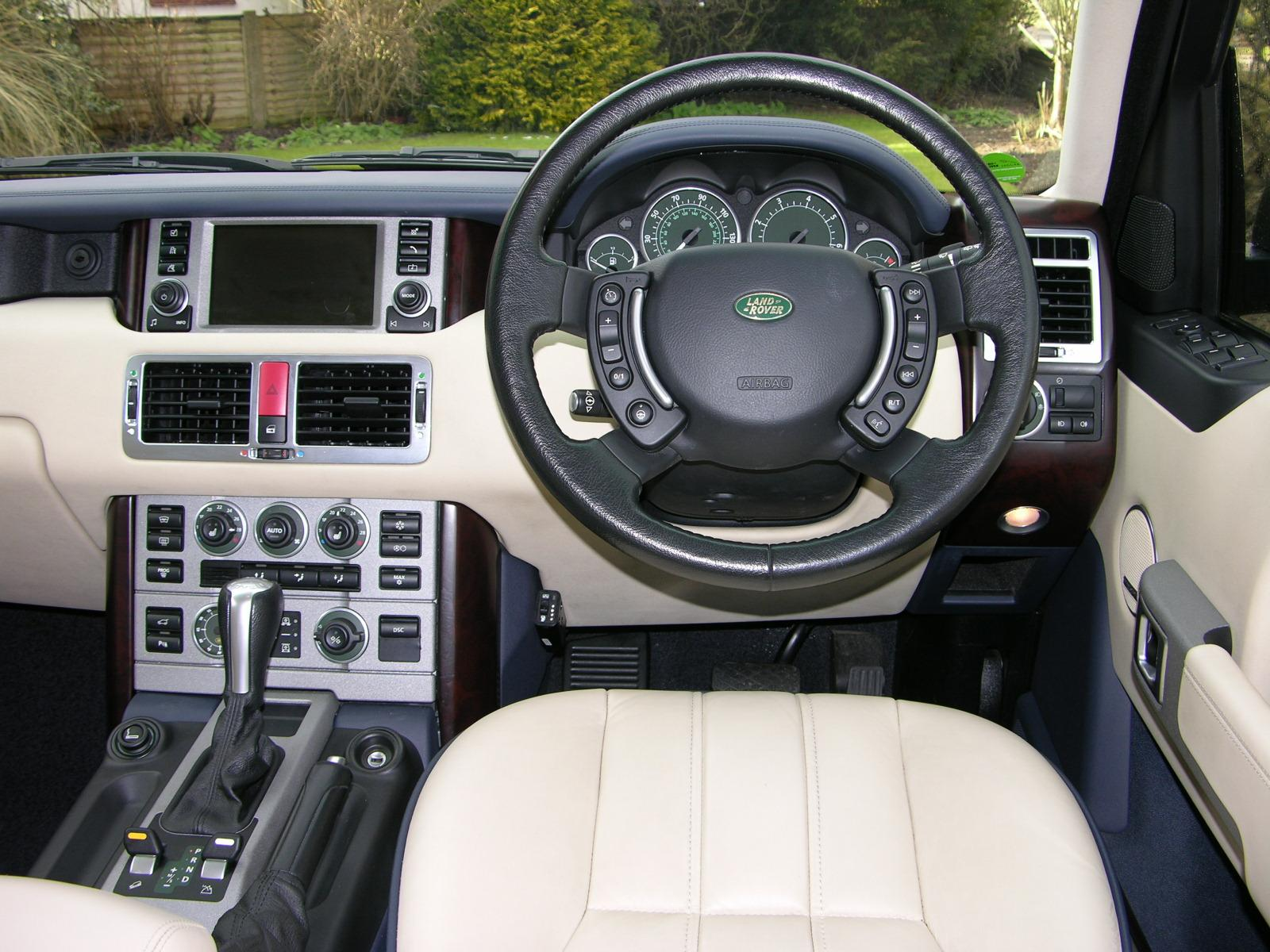
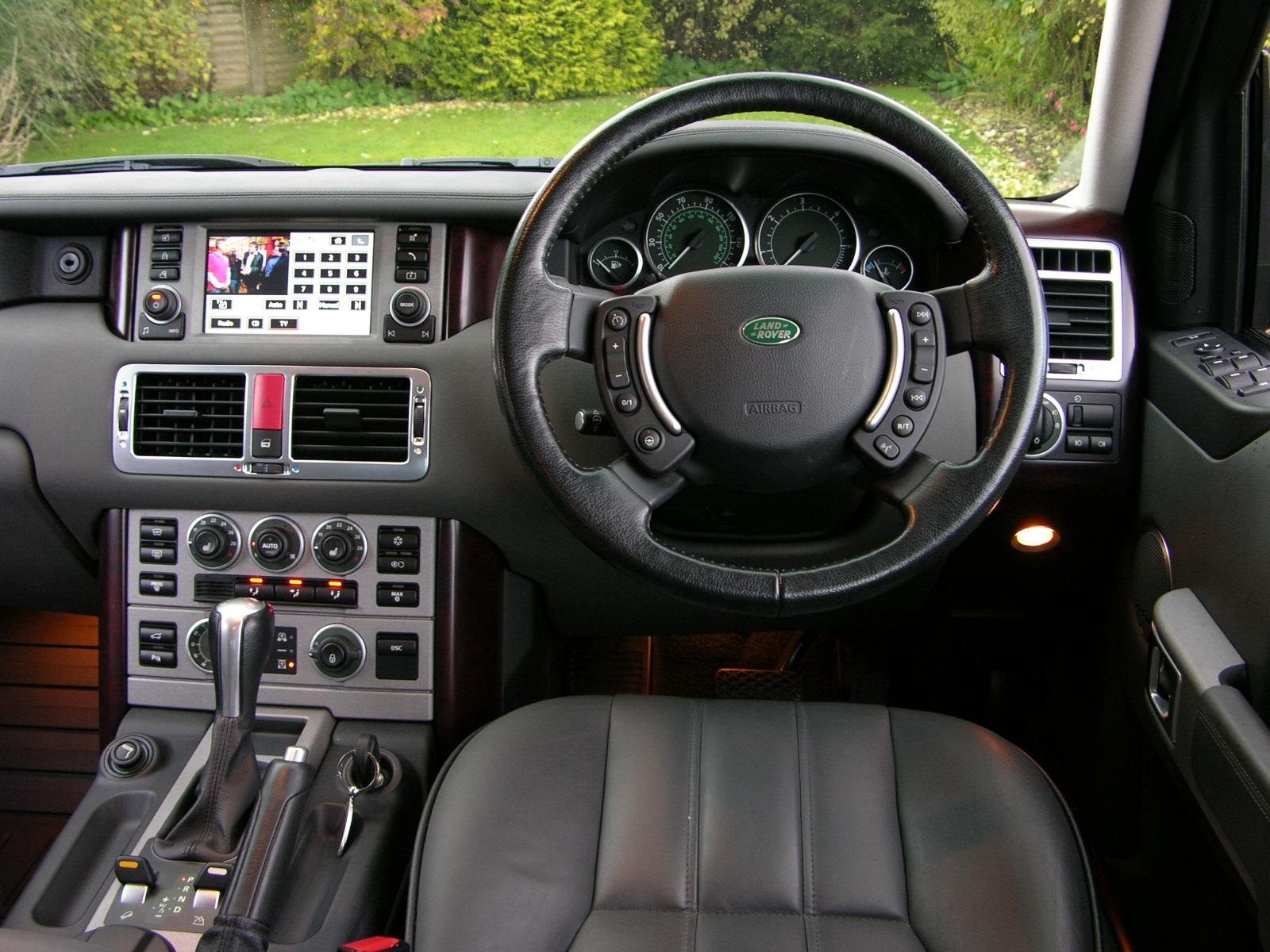
Interior of a 2006 Land Rover Range Rover

This system is linked by an industry-standard fibre optic network known as Media Oriented Systems Transport or MOST and an electronic network system known as CAN bus. A similar system is also used on Land Rover Discovery and Range Rover Sport.

Suppliers for the 2006 Range Rover's components include Continental Automotive for the complete cockpit module which incorporates the Denso touch screen navigation unit. Continental also supply the centre console unit. Other suppliers include Alpine car audio for integrated head unit rear seat entertainment. Connaught Electronics Limited (CEL) provides the Rear View Camera (RVC) and Wireless Camera (VentureCam) systems and PTI telephone capabilities are provided by Nokia.

Most importantly the audio system was co-developed with Harman Kardon. The premium offering gives a 720 Watt, 14-speaker system and was the first OEM vehicle to use the discrete Logic 7 surround algorithm.

== 2007 ==
For 2007, many of the Range Rover's changes were mechanical or interior. However, the external C-pillar was given a glass facelift akin to that of the Range Rover Sport, marking a subtle and yet clear departure from the original BMW influenced design.

On the inside, the hidden folding cup holder that popped out of the end of the dashboard in previous models was replaced by a simpler and more durable in-console design with sliding covers (similar in concept, but higher quality, to those in the Range Rover Sport). The ignition switch was moved from the lower part of the centre console up to the dashboard, next to the steering wheel and the Range Rover received the Range Rover Sport / LR3's Terrain Response system as well as a redesigned four-wheel drive control panel.

The handbrake is now electronic. Additionally, the seats differ from the old style, resembling the new Range Rover Sports seat design. Heated seats are standard across the board, with newly available climate controlled front seats standard on all supercharged trims and HSE Luxury/Vogue, with three settings for cool air and hot air activated by round dials on either side of the analog clock on the lower part of the center control stack, and the premium leather seats from the BMW era are no longer available, with new more premium quality leather in different grains for HSE/Vogue, SE/Vogue, HSE Luxury/ Vogue and all supercharged trims. The HVAC system was also updated with more vents (in particular, one placed in the centre of the top dash roll, to improve high-level cold air ventilation, positioned behind the centre speaker) and quieter operation. That, along with the acoustic laminated/heated windscreen lowers noise. An increase in interior storage is mainly attributed to the new split-dual glovebox, although the small upper glovebox is almost entirely occupied by the CD multi-changer and the Venture-cam, if fitted. In a return to original Range Rover styling, more wood inserts have been added to the doors and centre console. Midway through production of the 2007 model (around production date of January 2007) the style of the key was changed from the BMW design to Land Rover's "switchblade" type. This was a sealed unit and contained a rechargeable battery, charged from an exciting coil in the ignition switch, the idea being to avoid the need to replace key batteries for the life of the vehicle. The key contained three buttons: the standard “lock”, “unlock”, and a third “Land Rover” oval button which could be re-programmed to activate a number of functions. This button normally came pre-programmed to operate the tailgate release function.

The BMW M57 diesel engine was replaced for 2007 with the TDV8 engine developed by Ford and Land Rover at Dagenham and Gaydon. The 3.6-litre AJD-V8 32-valve twin turbo V8 engine develops 272 hp (203 kW), far more than the 177 hp (132 kW) of the previous engine and so is better capable to deal with the weighty vehicle. The maximum speed is 124 mph, whilst 0-60 mph was reduced to 8.6 seconds, which was good for a car with a kerb weight of 2.75 tons. Torque is a substantial 472 lb/ft (640 Nm) at 2,000 rpm.

Other changes for 2007 include better brakes supplied by Brembo, revised suspension, a slightly altered rear carpet shape around the front seat rear mountings, and Land Rover's Terrain Response system. Supercharged Range Rovers have an electronic rear differential (optional on other models).

== 2010 ==
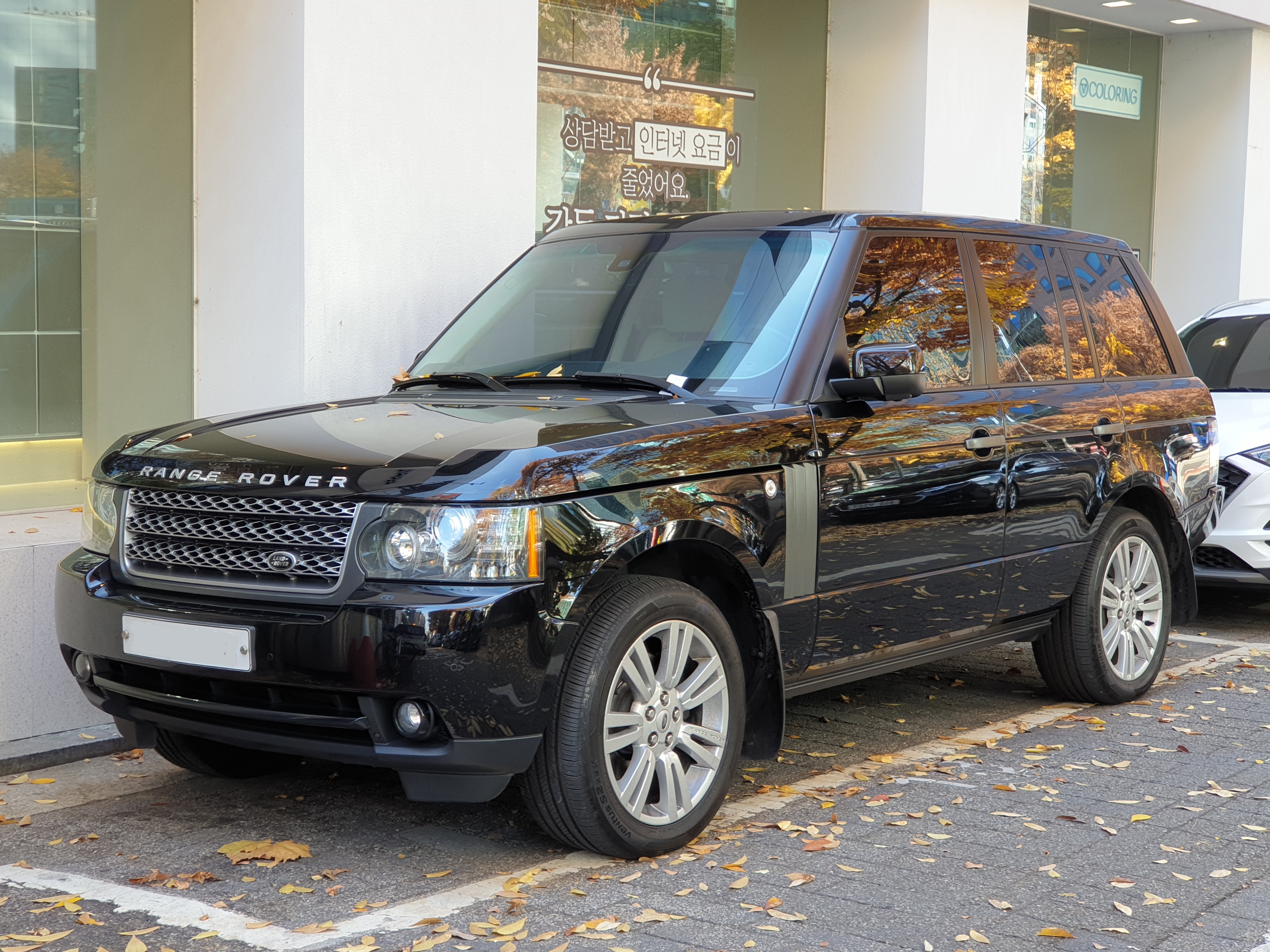
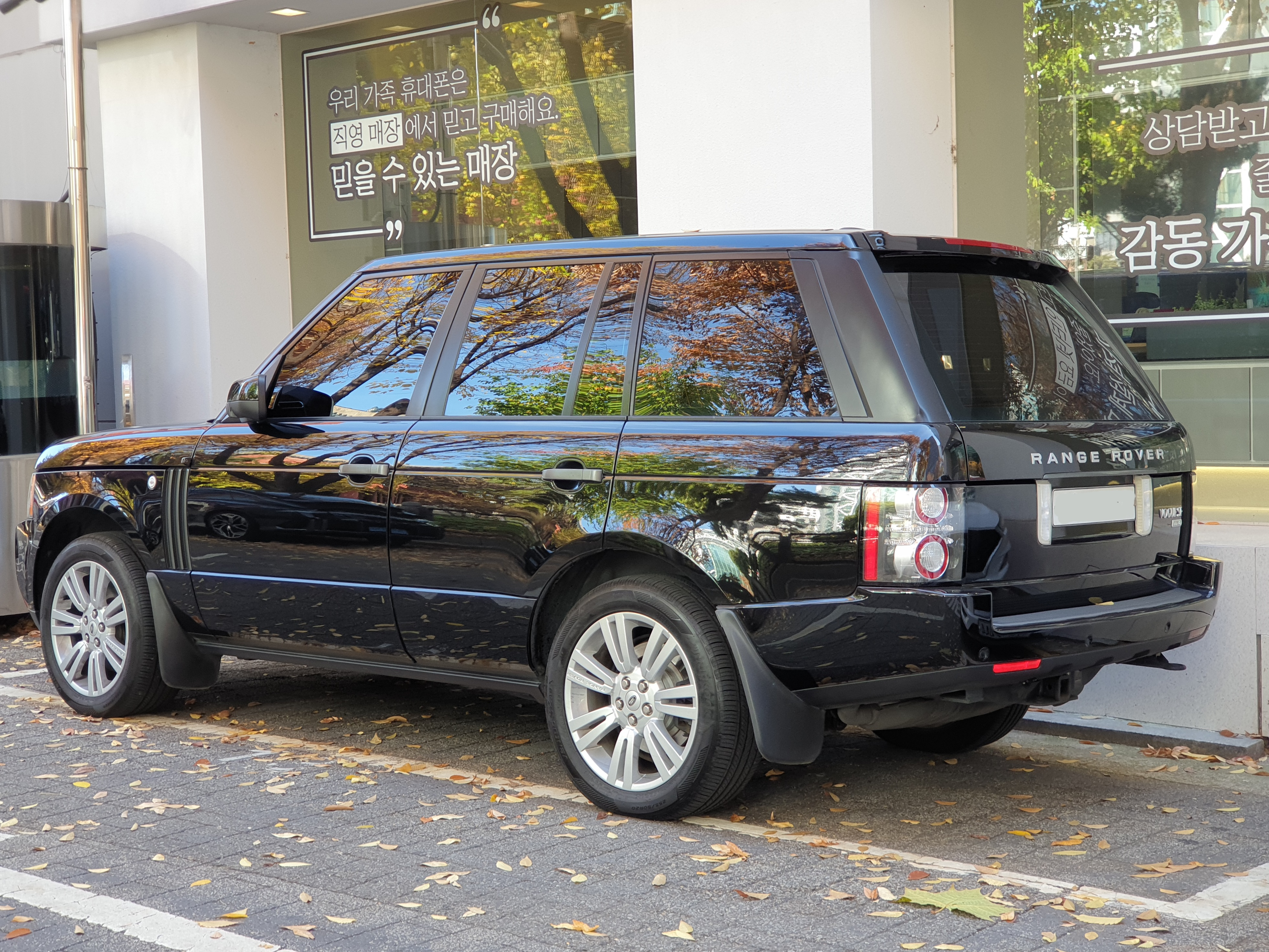
2010–2012 Land Rover Range Rover

For the 2010 model year refresh, the Range Rover received an updated exterior grille, a multicamera vision system, front bumper with newly repositioned fog lights lower in the bumper, LED accented bi-xenon headlights/LED tail/brake lights with front and rear amber LED turn signals with a three bar design, optional blind spot assist and adaptive auto high beam headlights which are now part of the new for 2010 vision assist package optional on the HSE and HSE with the luxury package, standard on all supercharged trims. Two new petrol engines (5.0 naturally aspirated V8 and 5.0 supercharged V8), and new features. It was unveiled at the 2009 New York Auto Show.

The interior of the Range Rover was given a minor facelift, consisting mainly of redesigned and repositioned switchgear (which saw many of the originally BMW era designed items updated or replaced), along with new options never before available for Range Rover like the addition of push button engine start/stop. The 2010 Range Rover also gained new visual display units as also seen in the new for 2010 Jaguar XJ (X351). This change consisted of a 12-inch TFT LCD virtual instrument panel, which replaces the conventional cluster design — instead 'virtual' gauges are displayed where physical analog gauges were previously. This allows various sets of information to be displayed as required — for example navigation and map information can be displayed instead of engine readouts, whilst when one of the off-road driving modes is selected on the Terrain Response system the 'gauges' are reorganised to provide space to display the schematic of the vehicle's suspension, steering and transmission systems. The other display unit is fitted to the centre console and uses a bi-directional screen to show different images depending on viewing angle (not available in the US). This allows navigational information to be displayed to the driver, whilst someone in the front passenger seat can use the same screen to use the onboard DVD player at the same time, for example. This system also contains a state-of-the-art multi-camera system from Valeo Vision Systems in Ireland, which allows the driver to see around the vehicle during manoeuvres and which contains multiple overlays and views. For 2012 model year, it got a new wheel center cap design with 'Range Rover' logo on it instead of 'Land Rover', also plastic on side vent and door handle were deleted.

=== Holland & Holland ===
Unveiled in early 2010, the Holland & Holland edition Range Rover is billed as an all season luxury supercar. It is not an official Land Rover limited edition, the model is produced by Overfinch using a standard Range Rover furnished with unique features using Holland & Holland as design consultants. Supplied to Overfinch unfurnished and sometimes unpainted, when complete they can be maintained officially through any Land Rover dealership. The cars can be finished in five unique colours including Tintern Green, a famous Holland & Holland colour; the cars can also be specified with two-tone leather and extended walnut trim, which can be colour matched to a customer's gun. Features unique to the Holland & Holland include a bespoke rear console and refrigerator including power outputs and storage for branded crystal tumblers. In the boot, all Holland & Holland cars have a gun box fully furnished and including a drinks cabinet. Either the 4.4 TDV8 or 5.0 Supercharged engines can be chosen, both with extra power, the cars also feature a modified 'Aero 3' Overfinch body kit to distinguish them from other Range Rovers.

== 2011 ==
The 2011 model year Range Rovers include minor styling changes, improved interiors and an upgraded 4x4 system as well new optional packages. A new 4.4-litre TDV8 diesel engine became available with a new ZF 8HP70 eight-speed automatic transmission. There are also new leather and wood colours, as well as reclining rear seats with winged headrests.

=== Production ===
Honeywell Turbo Technologies produced the turbochargers used in LR-TDV8 engine from 2011 in the new 4.4 TDV8 due to reliability issues on the 3.6 TDV8 setup.

== Engines ==
=== Petrol engines ===
Model	Years	Engine type	Power at rpm	Torque at rpm
4.4 L V8	2002–2005	4,398 cc (268 cu in) DOHC V8 (BMW M62)	286 PS (210 kW; 282 hp) at 5,400	440 N⋅m (325 lbf⋅ft) at 3,600
4.2 L V8 Supercharged	2005–2009	4,197 cc (256 cu in) V8 Supercharged (Jaguar AJ-V8)	400 PS (294 kW; 395 hp) at 5,750	560 N⋅m (413 lbf⋅ft) at 3,500
4.4 L V8	2005–2009	4,394 cc (268 cu in) V8 (Jaguar AJ-V8)	305 PS (224 kW; 301 hp) at 5,750	440 N⋅m (325 lbf⋅ft) at 4,000
5.0 L V8	2009–2012	4,999 cc (305 cu in) V8 (AJ133)	375 PS (276 kW; 370 hp) at 6,500	510 N⋅m (376 lbf⋅ft) at 3,500
5.0 L V8 Supercharged	2009–2012	4,999 cc (305 cu in) V8 Supercharged (AJ133)	510 PS (375 kW; 503 hp) at 6,000-6,500	625 N⋅m (461 lbf⋅ft) at 2,000-2,500

=== Diesel engines ===
Model	Years	Engine type	Power at rpm	Torque at rpm
3.0 L Td6	2002–2006	2,926 cc (179 cu in) Inline-6 Turbodiesel (BMW M57)	177 PS (130 kW; 175 hp) at 4,000	390 N⋅m (288 lbf⋅ft) at 2,000
3.6 L TDV8	2006–2010	3,630 cc (222 cu in) V8 Twin-Turbo Diesel (AJD-V8)	272 PS (200 kW; 268 hp) at 4,000	640 N⋅m (472 lbf⋅ft) at 2,000
4.4 L TDV8	2010–2012	4,367 cc (266.5 cu in) V8 Twin-Turbo Diesel (AJD-V8)	313 PS (230 kW; 309 hp) at 4,000	700 N⋅m (516 lb⋅ft) at 1,500-3,000

By the time of the launch, Land Rover had been sold to Ford in 2000, as part of the splitting up of the Rover Group. As a result, the initial engine derivatives were not included in the sale.

== Limited editions and cooperations ==
20th Anniversary Edition

To celebrate twenty years in North America, Land Rover produced the 20th Anniversary Edition Range Rover, of which only forty were produced. Each vehicle is a supercharged Range Rover in a special pearl white paint with "Diamond" split-spoke 20-inch wheels and a unique, two-tone interior. Badges on the tailgate and door sills denote the vehicle as such and lists its production number out of the 40. Only one of each model was distributed per dealer, and the dealerships were chosen in a lottery. The 40th model was auctioned at a silent auction to benefit charity.

35th Anniversary Edition

This was a UK spec production run. To celebrate thirty years, Land Rover produced the 35th Anniversary Edition Range Rover, of which only thirty were produced. Each vehicle of this edition were finished in Claret coachwork with 2-tone claret/jet interiors. The specifications were based on the Supercharged version and fitted with the 4.2-liter supercharged 400 bhp (298 kW; 406 PS) Jaguar V8.

40th Anniversary Edition (Autobiography Black)

To celebrate forty years, Land Rover produced the 40th Anniversary Edition Range Rover. Autobiography Black model features a different grille, Barolo Black paintwork, and a choice of Jet/Ivory or Jet/Pimento interiors. 700 cars were produced.

Autobiography Ultimate Edition

A special edition produced wholly by Land Rover. In the front, the car is little different from a standard Autobiography, more wood finishes are offered, as are a few unique trim pieces. The difference is in the rear cabin, which is furnished with two iPads, a fixed armrest with metal laptop desk, electric reclining climate-controlled seats, and a refrigerator. The car can be ordered in two colours, with 20-inch wheels, body-coloured door handles and smoked grills and gills. 500 cars were produced.

Armoured Range Rover

An armoured Range Rover Vogue was developed by Land Rover Special Vehicles in 2007, in cooperation with Armour Holdings Group. The vehicle was certified for European B6 ballistic protection standard. It includes side-blast and under-floor grenade protection, uprated suspension, handling and braking system, wheels fitted with run-flat tire system, and fuel cut-off override. Optional security features include tinted windows, anti-tamper exhaust, and intercom.

== Safety ==
ANCAP test results* Land Rover Range Rover variant(s) as tested (2002)
Test	Score
Overall	4 /5 stars
Frontal offset	11.87/16
Side impact	16/16
Pole	2/2
Seat belt reminders	0/3
Whiplash protection	Not Assessed
Pedestrian protection	Poor
Electronic stability control	Standard
