= Range Rover (L405) =

Land Rover Range Rover (L405)
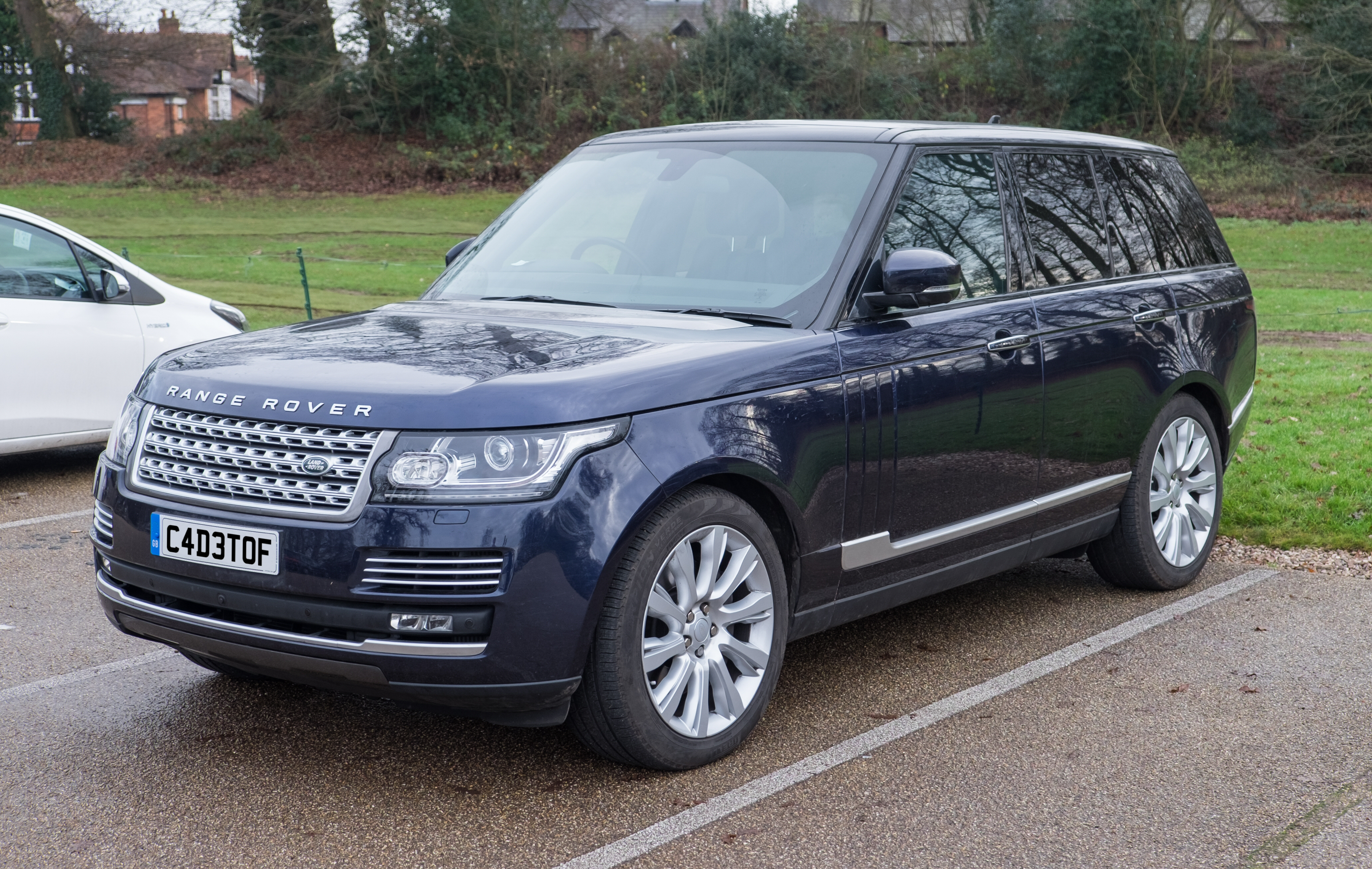
- 2016 Range Rover Autobiography (pre-facelift)

Overview
- Manufacturer: Land Rover Ltd. (2012); Jaguar Land Rover (2013–2021)
- Model code: L405
- Production: 2012–2021
- Model years: 2013–2021
- Assembly: United Kingdom: Solihull (Solihull plant)
- Designer: Gerry McGovern (2006)

Body and chassis
- Class: Mid-size luxury crossover 4x4 Full-size luxury crossover 4x4 (LWB)
- Body style: 5-door 4x4 / SUV; Long wheelbase 5-door 4x4 / SUV
- Layout: Front-engine, four-wheel drive
- Platform: JLR D7u
- Related: 3-door SV Coupé (cancelled); Range Rover Sport (L494); Land Rover Discovery (L462)

Powertrain
- Engine: Petrol; 2.0 L Ingenium PHEV I4; 3.0 L AJ126 s/c V6; 3.0 L Ingenium MHEV I6; 5.0 L AJ133 V8; 5.0 L AJ133 s/c V8; Diesel; 3.0 L TDV6/SDV6 V6; 3.0 L SDV6 Hybrid V6; 4.4 L Ford SDV8 V8
- Electric motor: 35 kW (48 PS; 47 hp) integrated Electric motor (SDV6 Hybrid); 85 kW (116 PS; 114 hp) Permanent Magnet Synchronous Motor (PHEV)
- Transmission: 8-speed automatic (ZF 8HP)
- Hybrid drivetrain: Diesel Parallel Hybrid (SDV6 Hybrid); Petrol PHEV (P400e PHEV)
- Battery: 13.1 kWh Lithium ion (PHEV)

Dimensions
- Wheelbase: 2,922 mm (115.0 in); 3,122 mm (122.9 in) (Long wheelbase)
- Length: 4,999 mm (196.8 in); 5,199 mm (204.7 in) (Long wheelbase)
- Width: 1,984 mm (78.1 in) (body); 2,073 mm (81.6 in) (mirrors folded); 2,220 mm (87.4 in) (mirrors extended)
- Height: 1,835 mm (72.2 in)
- Kerb weight: 2,160–2,360 kg (4,762–5,203 lb)

Chronology
- Predecessor: Range Rover (L322)
- Successor: Range Rover (L460)

The Range Rover (L405) is a mid-size to full-size luxury 4x4, made under the Land Rover brand by Jaguar Land Rover. It is the fourth generation of the original, main Range Rover series. It uses an all-aluminium monocoque unitary body structure, instead of the third generation's steel unibody — making it the first production 4x4 to do so, resulting in a weight reduction of 420 kg (926 lb) compared to its predecessor.

== Range Rover (2012–2021) ==
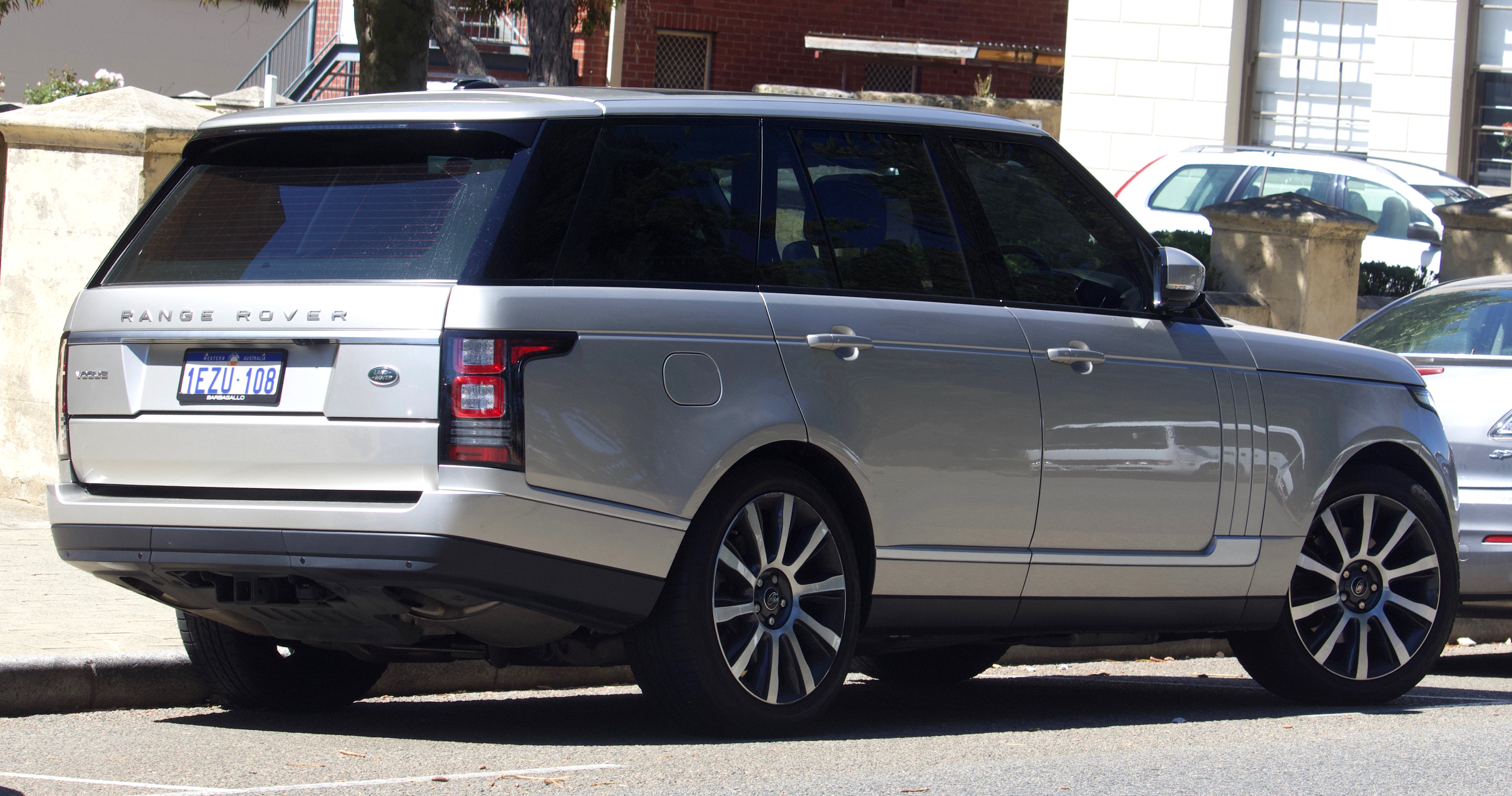
Range Rover Vogue (2016MY, pre-facelift)

The vehicle was unveiled at the 2012 Paris Motor Show. Sales of Range Rover began in late 2012 as 2013 models.

Early models include a choice of two petrol (5.0-litre 375 PS LR-V8 and 510PS LR-V8 Supercharged) and two diesel (3.0-litre 258PS TDV6 and 4.4-litre 339PS SDV8) engines, all with an eight-speed automatic transmission.

Japan models went on sale in January 2013. Early models include 5.0 V8 Vogue (375PS), 5.0 V8 Supercharged Vogue (510PS), Autobiography (510PS), and SVAutobiography Dynamic (550PS).

For the 2018 model year there was a mild facelift for the interior and exterior. On the exterior the Range Rover's front was changed from a "3 bar" grille to a new "4 bar" grille. Other exterior changes include new LED daytime running lights and thicker glass. The interior was overhauled with a new infotainment system. A second LCD replaced the old climate control knobs. Seat controls were moved to the door.

== Specifications ==
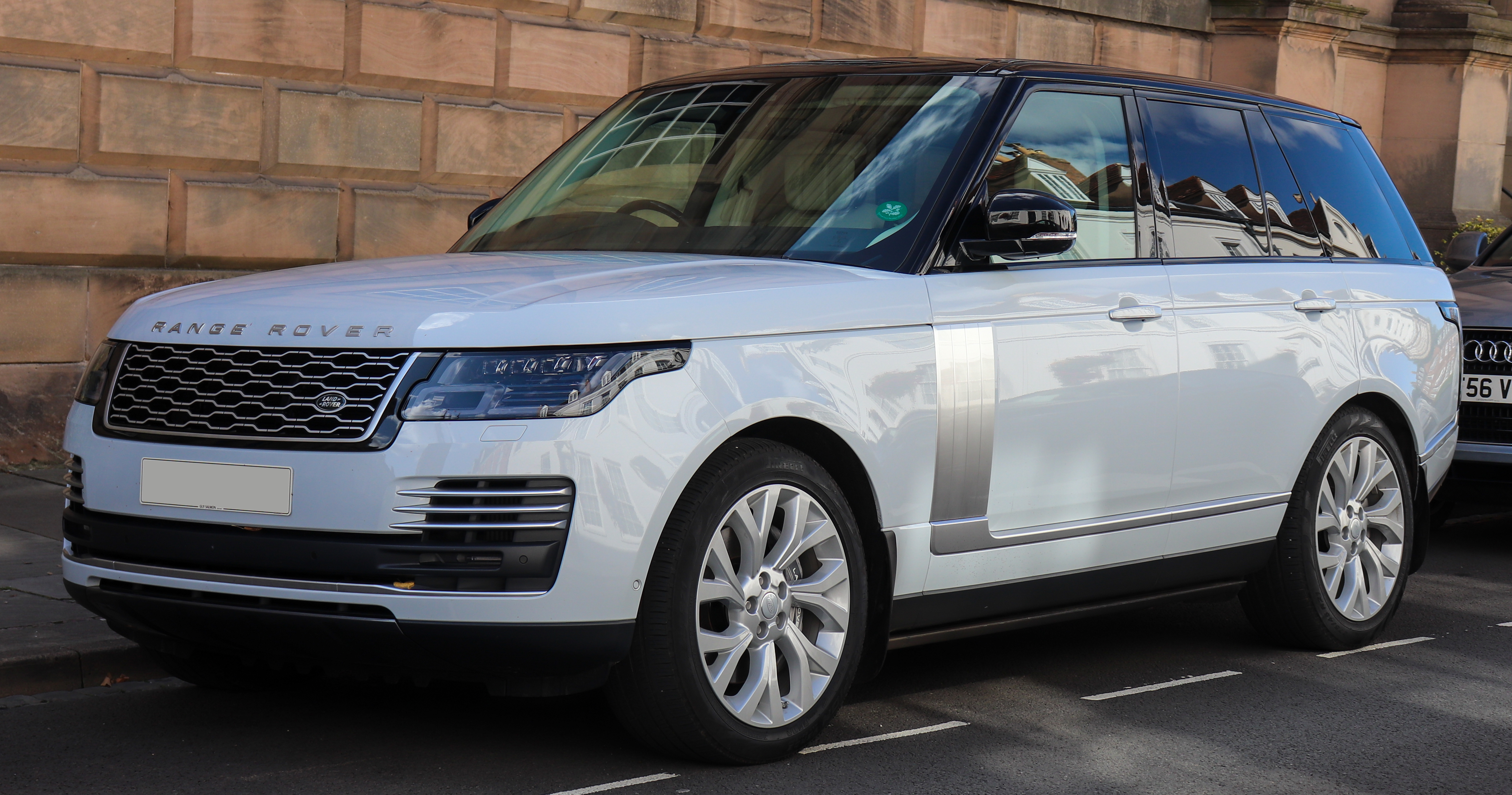

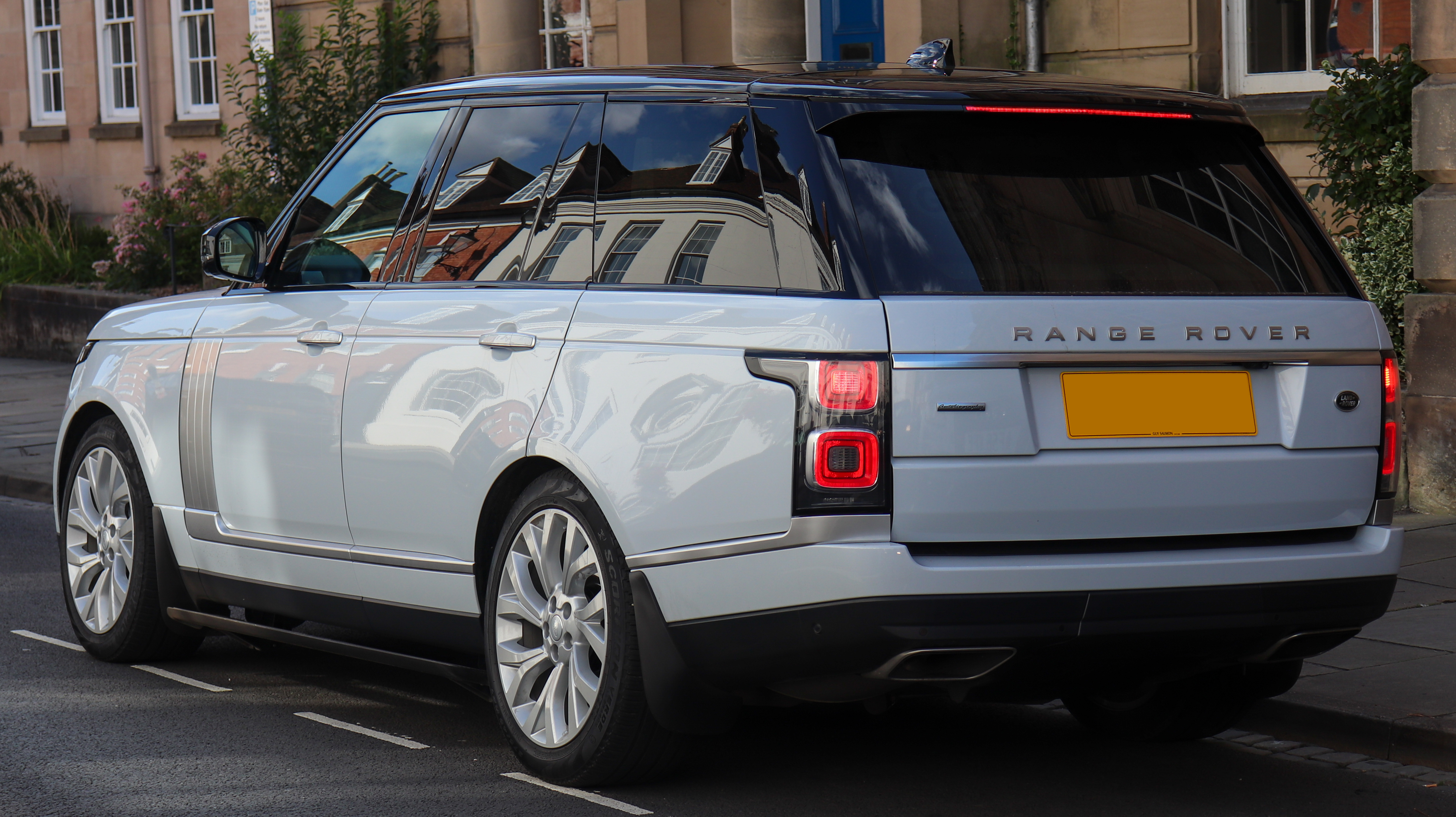
The MY2018 facelift consisted of new bumpers, tail and headlamps, door moulding, and new wheel designs.

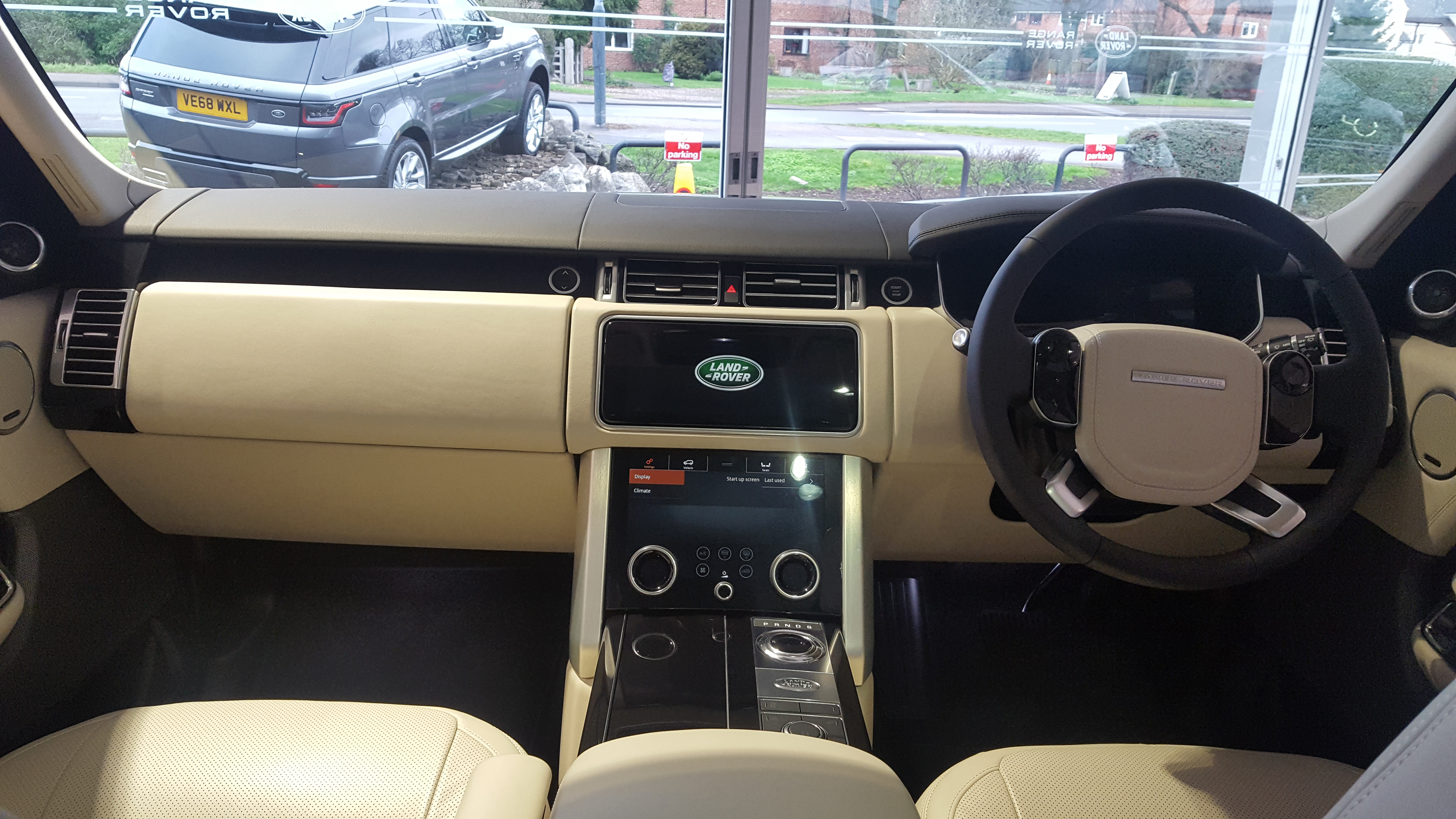
The facelifted interior introduced Touch Pro Duo infotainment from Velar (L560), along with new seats, door panels, and updated options for trims and colours.

The 4th generation (L405) Range Rover again uses a unitary monocoque body-shell, but contrary to the previous model, it is made from all-aluminium rather than steel, including unique high-strength alloy, up to 50% recycled aluminium; and production takes place in an all new aluminium facility at Land Rover's Solihull site.

The all-aluminium monocoque body structure is a first for a 4x4 SUV platform, according to Land Rover, resulting in a remarkable 39 percent lighter body-shell, and a reduction of 420 kg (926 lb) compared to its predecessor. The Range Rover has a new version of Terrain Response, dubbed Terrain Response 2.

=== Powertrain ===
The Range Rover has two diesel engines options and three petrol engines;

- 3.0 L V6 turbo diesel producing 258 PS (190 kW; 254 hp) and 600 N⋅m (443 lb⋅ft) of torque,
- 4.4 L V8 turbo diesel produces 340 PS (250 kW; 335 hp) and 700 N⋅m (516 lb⋅ft) of torque
- 5.0 L V8 petrol engine unit with two versions
  - the naturally aspirated engine produces 375 PS (276 kW; 370 hp) and 510 N⋅m (376 lb⋅ft) of torque
  - the supercharged version produces 510 PS (375 kW; 503 hp) and 625 N⋅m (461 lb⋅ft) of torque.
- A supercharged 3.0 L petrol V6 developing 340 PS (250 kW; 335 hp) or 380 PS (279 kW; 375 hp) were added in 2014.
- A 2.0 L I4 Ingenium petrol Plug-in Hybrid engine available for the 2019 Land Rover Range Rover P400e.

All engines use a variant of the 8 speed ZF 8HP transmission. Gears are selected from the Drive Select rotary shifter on the centre console or the driver can also manually select gears via the paddle shift controls on the steering wheel.

The car has permanent four-wheel drive with 50/50 torque split and a Magna Steyr DD295 two-speed transfer case for high and low range options.

Model	Engine type	Power	Torque	0-60 mph (0–97 km/h)	Max speed	CO_{2} emissions
Petrol
2.0 L Ingenium Plug-in Hybrid	1,999 cc (122 cu in) I4 + 85KW ELECTRIC MOTOR	404 PS (297 kW; 398 hp)	640 N⋅m (472 lb⋅ft)	6.8 secs	137 mph (220 km/h)	72 g/km
3.0 L Supercharged (340 PS)	2,995 cc (183 cu in) V6	340 PS (250 kW; 335 hp)	450 N⋅m (332 lb⋅ft)	7.4 secs	130 mph (209 km/h)	254 g/km
3.0 L Supercharged (380 PS)	2,995 cc (183 cu in) V6	380 PS (279 kW; 375 hp)	450 N⋅m (332 lb⋅ft)	6.9 secs	130 mph (209 km/h)	254 g/km
5.0 L (2013)	4,999 cc (305 cu in) V8	375 PS (276 kW; 370 hp)	510 N⋅m (376 lb⋅ft)	6.5 secs	130 mph (209 km/h)	299 g/km
5.0 L Supercharged (2013–2016)	4,999 cc (305 cu in) V8	510 PS (375 kW; 503 hp)	625 N⋅m (461 lb⋅ft)	5.1 secs	155 mph (249 km/h)	322 g/km
5.0 L Supercharged (2017–2022)	4,999 cc (305 cu in) V8	525 PS (386 kW; 518 hp)	625 N⋅m (461 lb⋅ft)	5.4 secs	155 mph (249 km/h)	304 g/km
5.0 L Supercharged SVAutobiography (2015–2016)	4,999 cc (305 cu in) V8	550 PS (405 kW; 542 hp)	680 N⋅m (502 lb⋅ft)	4.5 secs	162 mph (261 km/h)	322 g/km
5.0 L Supercharged SVAutobiography (2017–2022)	4,999 cc (305 cu in) V8	565 PS (416 kW; 557 hp)	700 N⋅m (516 lb⋅ft)	4.3 secs	176 mph (283 km/h)	290 g/km
Diesel
3.0 L TDV6	2,993 cc (183 cu in) V6	258 PS (190 kW; 254 hp)	600 N⋅m (443 lb⋅ft)	7.4 secs	130 mph (209 km/h)	196 g/km
3.0 L SDV6 (250 PS)	2,993 cc (183 cu in) V6	250 PS (184 kW; 247 hp)	600 N⋅m (443 lb⋅ft)	8.0 secs	130 mph (209 km/h)	200 g/km
3.0 L SDV6 (275 PS)	2,993 cc (183 cu in) V6	275 PS (202 kW; 271 hp)	625 N⋅m (461 lb⋅ft)	7.9 secs	130 mph (209 km/h)	200 g/km
3.0 L SDV6 (300 PS)	2,993 cc (183 cu in) V6	300 PS (221 kW; 296 hp)	650 N⋅m (479 lb⋅ft)	7.4 secs	130 mph (209 km/h)	209 g/km
3.0 L SDV6 Hybrid	2,993 cc (183 cu in) V6 + 35KW ELECTRIC MOTOR	340 PS (250 kW; 335 hp)	700 N⋅m (516 lb⋅ft)	6.5 secs	135 mph (217 km/h)	169 g/km
4.4 L SDV8	4,367 cc (266 cu in) V8	340 PS (250 kW; 335 hp)	740 N⋅m (546 lb⋅ft)	6.9 secs	135 mph (217 km/h)	229 g/km

=== Suspension ===
The Range Rover has electronic cross-linked air suspension with variable ride height. Multiple suspension modes are provided as standard, including: access, normal on-road, off-road, and two user unselectable extended heights. The car has an automated load leveling mechanism.

Adaptive dynamics continuously analyse vehicle movements over 500 times per second, reacting instantaneously to road conditions and driver actions. Variable dampers adjust to maintain a composed and balanced ride.

The dynamic response system (formerly known as Active Cornering Enhancement, or ACE) is able to independently adjust the front and rear hydraulic sway bars, reducing the amount of body roll during cornering, as well as enhancing control and stability at higher speeds. The system is also able to detect off-road conditions via the Terrain Response 2 system, where it dynamically reduces the level of roll compensation, to allow greater wheel articulation to increase contact with the terrain and improve comfort and control.

The system is able to entirely absorb roll up to 0.4 g before gradually increasing roll. It also adjusts handling balance-reducing understeer or oversteer-by changing pressure on the front and rear stabilizer bars. This makes the car feel more agile at low speeds and more stable at high speeds.

=== Terrain Response ===
The Range Rover's all-terrain capability features a new second generation Terrain Response system. The system monitors ground conditions to determine the most appropriate response to the terrain and automatically optimises vehicle settings. The system provides settings for grass, gravel, snow, mud, sand, and rock crawl, Terrain Response technology instantly reconfigures transmission, suspension, and traction settings. Controlled Acceleration Control prevents excessive speeds downhill, and Hill Start Assist prevents the vehicle from inadvertently rolling backwards.

=== Safety ===
The Range Rover has driver and passenger airbags (side, seat-front, thorax and pelvis), plus airbags to protect rear-seat passengers. Other safety aids include cornering brake control, which helps to maintain stability when cornering by adjusting the driver's generated brake pressure, along with dynamic stability control to maintain control by reducing engine torque and applying braking to the appropriate wheel and correcting understeer or oversteer.

ANCAP test results* Land Rover Range Rover TDV6 variants (2013)
Test	Score
Overall	5 /5 stars
Frontal offset	15.19/16
Side impact	16/16
Pole	2/2
Seat belt reminders	0/3
Whiplash protection	Good
Pedestrian protection	Adequate
Electronic stability control	Standard

Euro NCAP test results* Land Rover Range Rover, Large Off-Road (2012)
Test	Points	%
Overall:	5 /5 stars	
Adult occupant:	33	91%
Child occupant:	41	84%
Pedestrian:	23	63%
Safety assist:	6	86%

== Range Rover Long-Wheelbase, Autobiography Black (2014–2021) ==
The vehicles were unveiled at the 2013 Los Angeles Auto Show. Deliveries of long-wheelbase Range Rover models were set to begin in late Q1 2014.

The Range Rover Long-Wheelbase Autobiography Black is a limited version of the 2014 Range Rover Long-Wheelbase for the US market, with the first 25 units in Valloire White pearlescent body colour.

Changes include front grille and side vents and badging in black enamel and chrome, signature rear lamps, a chrome accent finish to the tailgate and auxiliary vents to the front and new exclusive 7-spoke 21-inch wheels with a high gloss polished finish.

More changes are individualised front and rear seating package, bespoke seat cover design, adjustable 18-way front seat, two individual fully adjustable rear seats, new rear center console (electrically deployable tables covered in black leather), 10.2-inch rear seat entertainment screens, tread plates with an illuminated 'Autobiography Black' script, a choice of three interior colour schemes (Ebony/Lunar, Espresso/Tan, Dark Cherry/Ivory).

Early models included Supercharged and Autobiography trim levels with either a three-across bench seat or individual rear seats with a centre console.

== Range Rover SV Coupe (Cancelled) ==
In 2018, Land Rover unveiled the limited edition Range Rover SV Coupe at the 2018 Geneva Auto Show. The variant would seat four passengers and be the fastest Range Rover ever built. The vehicle was expected to go on sale in 2020 as a 2021 model year vehicle with availability limited to 999 units. However, in January 2019, Land Rover announced that Range Rover SV Coupe had been cancelled due to financial constraints and due to the vehicle containing many expensive and unique parts that were incompatible with other Range Rover variants. Land Rover notified all customers that placed orders and reservations for the SV Coupe, informing them that development of the unique 3-door SV Coupe had been cancelled and that all their orders and reservations for the model were cancelled as a result. Land Rover stated that funding and investments towards development for the cancelled vehicle would instead be spent on developing electric crossovers and SUVs, as part of efforts to return to profitability.
