= List of Ford engines =

Ford engines are those used in Ford Motor Company vehicles and in aftermarket, sports and kit applications. Different engine ranges are used in various global markets.

== 3 cylinder ==
A series of Ford DOHC 12-valve straight-three engines with Twin Independent Variable Camshaft Timing (Ti-VCT), labelled as Fox (1.0 L), Duratec (1.1 L), Dragon (1.2 L and 1.5 L) and as EcoBoost (1.0 L and 1.5 L) when turbocharged.

=== 1.0 L Fox ===
- 2012–present 1.0 L Fox Ti-VCT I3, naturally aspirated.

The smallest Ford 3-cylinder engine.

  - Displacement: 998 cc
  - Bore x stroke: 71.9 mm x 82.0 mm
  - Compression ratio: 12.0:1
  - Maximum power: 65–85 PS (48–63 kW; 64–84 hp) at 6300–6500 rpm
  - Maximum torque: 100–105 N⋅m (74–77 lb⋅ft) at 4100–4500 rpm
  - Applications:
    - 2013–2017 Ford Fiesta
    - 2016–2021 Ford Ka
- 2012–present 1.0 L EcoBoost I3

The turbocharged version of 1.0 L Fox engine.

=== 1.1 L Duratec ===
- 2017–2023 1.1 L Duratec Ti-VCT I3, naturally-aspirated.
  - Displacement: 1084 cc
  - Bore x stroke: 73.0 mm x 86.3 mm
  - Compression ratio: 12.0:1
  - Maximum power: 70–85 PS (51–63 kW; 69–84 hp) at 5000–6500 rpm
  - Maximum torque: 108–110 N⋅m (80–81 lb⋅ft) at 3500 rpm
  - Application:
    - 2017–2023 Ford Fiesta

=== 1.2 L Dragon ===
- 2017–2021 1.2 L Dragon Ti-VCT I3, naturally aspirated.

Based from 1.5 L Dragon engine but with smaller piston and without balancer shaft.

  - Displacement: 1194 cc
  - Bore x stroke: 75.0 mm x 90.0 mm
  - Compression ratio: 11.2:1
  - Maximum power: 96 PS (71 kW; 95 hp) PS at 6500 rpm
  - Maximum torque: 119 N⋅m (88 lb⋅ft) at 4250 rpm
  - Applications:
    - 2017–2021 Ford Figo/Aspire/Freestyle

=== 1.5 L Dragon ===
- 2017–present 1.5 L Dragon Ti-VCT I3, naturally aspirated.
  - Displacement: 1497 cc
  - Bore x stroke: 84.0 mm x 90.0 mm
  - Compression ratio: 11.0:1
  - Maximum power:
    - 123–128 PS (90–94 kW; 121–126 hp) at 6500 rpm
    - 136 PS (100 kW; 134 hp) at 5500 rpm (ethanol)
  - Maximum torque:
    - 150–158 N⋅m (111–117 lb⋅ft) at 4250–4750 rpm
    - 150–158 N⋅m (111–117 lb⋅ft) at 4750 rpm (ethanol)
  - Applications:
    - 2017–2023 Ford EcoSport
    - 2018–present Ford Focus
    - 2018–2021 Ford Ka
- 2018–present 1.5 L EcoBoost I3

The turbocharged version of 1.5 L Dragon engine.

== 4 cylinder ==
- 1904–1906 Ford Model B (1904) engine
- 1906–1908 Ford Model N/R/S engine
- 1908–1927 Ford Model T engine
- 1928–1931 Ford Model A engine (also see Ford Model A (1927–1931))
- 1932–1934 Ford Model B engine (see Ford Model B (1932))
- 1932–1962 Ford Sidevalve
- 1951–1966 Consul 4—(United Kingdom)
- 1955–1965 Taunus M—(Germany)
- 1961–1977 Essex V4—(United Kingdom: Used in Transit Mk.1, Granada Mk.1/Consul, Capri Mk.1) (South Africa: Used in Ford Corsair, Ford Capri Mk. 1, Ford Cortina Mk III)
- 1962–1981 Taunus V4 (or Cologne V4)—(Germany) Used in Ford Taunus V4, Saab Saab 95, Saab Sonett and Saab 96 until 1980.
- 1968–1983 Renault Cléon-Fonte—Ford Corcel from Willys/Renault Dauphine (Brazil)
  - 1983–1995 CHT—(Brazil)
- 1959–2002 Kent—(UK) 1.0–1.6 L I4 (Europe)
  - 1959–1968 Kent (Original) 1.0–1.5 L (used in Anglia, Consul Capri, Cortina Mk.1)
  - 1962–1975 Lotus Twin Cam 1.6 L (used in Lotus Elan, Cortina, Europa, Ford Escort, and Caterham Super Seven)
  - 1967–1980 Crossflow 1.1 L, 1.3 L, 1.6 L (used in Cortina Mk.2, Capri Mk.1, Escort Mk.1 & Mk.2, Ford Fiesta Mk.1 (1.6 versions), Reliant Anadol (1.3 and 1.6 versions)
  - 1969–198? BDA 1.6 L (used in Escort RS1600, and Caterham Super Seven)
  - 1976–1989 Valencia 1.0 L, 1.1 L, 1.3 L (used in Fiesta Mk.1 & Mk.2, Escort Mk.3, Orion
  - 1989–1995 HCS 1.0 L, 1.1 L, 1.3 L (used in Fiesta Mk.3, Orion Mk.2/Escort Mk3-6)
  - 1995–2002 Endura-E 1.3 L OHV (UK: Fiesta Mk.4, Ka)
- 1970s OHC/Pinto/T-88 Series
  - 1970–1989 EAO—1.3 L–2.0 L Cortina Mk.3-Mk.5, Sierra, Capri Mk.2&3, Granada Mk.2&3, Scorpio, Transit
  - 1974–1990s OHC—2.3 L (used in the Pinto, Mustang, the Merkur XR4Ti, 1975–79 Brazilian Maverick and Thunderbird Turbo Coupe)
  - 1983– OHC—2.0 L 2.3 L and the 2.5 L for the Ranger
- 1989– I4 DOHC (used in Sierra, Scorpio/Granada Mk.3, Transit)
- 1972–2000 York (Diesel) 2.3 L, 2.4 L, 2.5 L (Used in Transit, A-Series (4 and 6-cyl version), London Taxi, also Ford-Iveco trucks, "DI" (Direct-Injection) version from 1984–on)
- 1980–2002 CVH—1.1 L/1.3 L/1.4 L/1.6 L/1.8 L/1.9 L/2.0 L Escort (International), Escort (North America), Orion, Fiesta Mk.2, Sierra (Europe, Sierra from '89 onwards, 1.9 L and 2.0 L for USA only)
- 1984–1994 HSC—2.3 L/2.5 L for Tempo and Taurus
- 1983–1996 LT—(Diesel) 1.6 L/1.8 L/ 1.8 L turbodiesel. Used in Escort, Orion, Fiesta
- 1986–2000 Lynx—(Diesel) 1.8 L/ 1.8 L turbodiesel. Used in Escort, Orion, Fiesta, Mondeo. Later branded as Endura-DE and developed to Duratorq DLD-418.
- 1990s Mazda F—Mazda-engine 2.2 L for Probe
- 1992–2004 Zeta/Zetec/Zetec-E (Used in Escort ZX2 (North America), Escort Mk.5 / Orion, Fiesta Mk.4, Ford Fiesta Mk.3/3.5, Mondeo Mk.1, Focus) (Ford Aspire/Kia)
- 1995– Zetec-SE (Sigma) (Used in Fiesta Mk.4, Puma, Focus)
- 2000– Duratorq—Diesel (Europe: Used in Mondeo Mk.3, Focus, Transit, Transit Connect, London Taxi TX1 (from 2002 onwards))
- 2000– Duratec 8v/HE/20/23—(Duratec branded Mazda-engine used in Mondeo Mk.3, Focus Mk.2)
- 2000–present Power Stroke 3.0—3.0 L Diesel (Brazil), Used in Ford Ranger (Argentina)
- 2009–present EcoBoost—1.6 L/2.0 L Ford Sigma 1.6 L and L 2.0 L-engine with Direct Injection Spark Ignition
- 2013–present EcoBoost—1.5 L
- 2016–present EcoBlue—Diesel

== 5 cylinder ==
- 2004–2011: The 2.5 Duratec is an inline 5 engine used in the Ford Focus ST225, Kuga, S-Max ST and various Volvo T5 models.It features DOHC, 20 valves and Ti-VCT.It displaces 2521cc and produces 166 kW (225 hp) and 320 N.m (236 lb.ft) in the ST or 227 kW (305 hp) and 440 N.m (324.5 lb.ft) in the Focus RS, or even up to 257 kW (345 hp) and 460 N.m (339 lb.ft) in the RS500.
- 2012–present: The 3.2 Duratorq is an I5 engine used in the Ford Transit, the Ford Ranger, Ford Everest, Mazda BT-50 and the Vivarail. For the North American-spec Transit, * the 3.2 L Duratorq is modified to meet American and Canadian emissions standards and is branded as a Power Stroke engine. The 3.2 Power Stroke is rated 188 PS (138 kW; 185 hp) and 470 N⋅m (350 lb⋅ft).[8]

== 6 cylinder ==
Ford was late to offer a six-cylinder engine in their cars, only introducing a six in 1941 after the failure of the 1906 Model K. The company relied on its famous Flathead V8 for most models, only seriously producing six-cylinder engines in the 1960s. The company was also late with a V6 engine, introducing a compact British V6 in 1967 but waiting until the 1980s to move their products to rely on V6 engines. The company has relied on seven major V6 families ever since, the Cologne/Taunus V6, British Essex V6, Canadian Essex V6, Vulcan V6, Mondeo V6, Cyclone V6, and Nano V6. The first five of these lines are no longer in production, leaving only the Cyclone and Nano as the company's midrange engines.

- 1906–1907 Model K straight-6
- 1941–2016 Straight-6
  - 1941–1951 226 CID Flathead
  - 1948–1953 254 CID Flathead used in buses and two ton trucks
  - 1952–1964 OHV (215, 223, 262) 215-223 used in car and non-HD pickups. 262 used in HD trucks only.

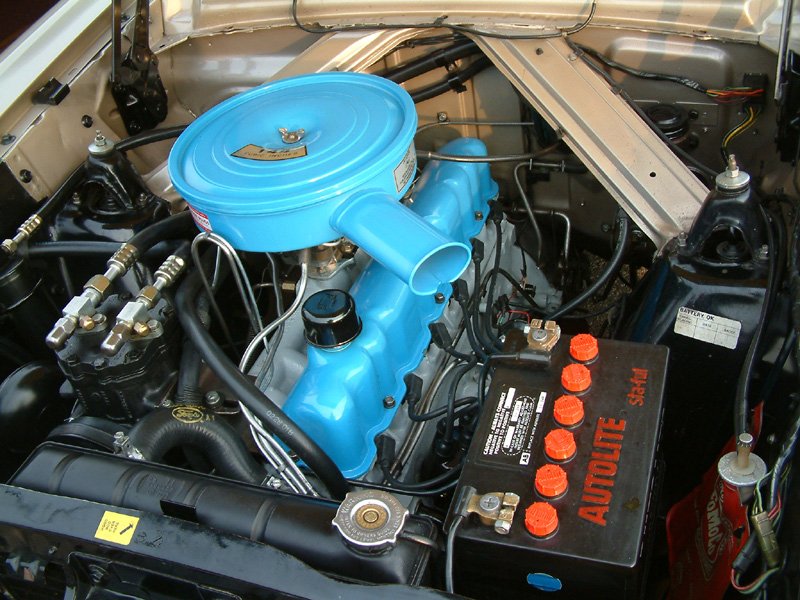
144 CID straight-6 in a 1964 Ford Falcon

  - 1960–1993 (Longer in Australia) 'Falcon Six' OHV (144, 170, 200, 250) car usage.
  - 1964–1996 OHV (240, 300, 4.9 L) truck 6 built in Cleveland, Ohio
  - 1988–2002 Ford Australia SOHC Intech I6 Falcon engines
    - 1988–1989 3.2 L SOHC
    - 1988–1992 3.9 L SOHC
    - 1992–2002 4.0 L SOHC
    - 1998–2002 4.0 L SOHC VCT
  - 2002–2016 Ford Australia Barra DOHC I6 4.0 L engines
- 1951–1966 Zephyr 6—(United Kingdom)
- 1964–2011 Cologne/Taunus V6—1.8–4.0 L pushrod and SOHC V6
- 1966–1988 (2000 in South Africa) British Essex V6—60° British V6 2.5/3.0/3.1/3.4 L
- 1982–2008 Canadian Essex V6—90° V6, 3.8/3.9/4.2 L models
- 1986–1987 Ford-Cosworth GBA engine—120° V6, 1.5 L (Formula One engine)
- 1986–2007 Vulcan V6—60° pushrod V6 3.0 L, originally designed for the Taurus
- 1989–1995 SHO V6 3.0/3.2 L DOHC V6
- 1994–2012 Mondeo V6 aluminum 60° DOHC
  - 1994–2002 Duratec 25—2.5 L
  - 1996–2012 Duratec 30—3.0 L
  - 2000–2011 Jaguar AJ-V6—2.1/2.5/3.0 L
- 2003–present Ecotorq—7.3/9.0/12.7 L Diesel
- 2004–present AJD-V6—2.7 L Diesel
- 2006–2016 SI6—3.0/3.2 L I6 designed by Volvo
- 2006–present Cyclone V6 aluminum 60° DOHC
  - 2018 Duratec 33—3.3 L
  - 2006–present Duratec 35—3.5 L
  - 2007–present Duratec 37—3.7 L
- 2009–present EcoBoost V6 engine
  - 2015–present EcoBoost—2.7 L
  - 2016–present EcoBoost—3.0 L
  - 2009–present EcoBoost—3.5 L

== 8 cylinder ==
Ford introduced the Flathead V8 in their affordable 1932 Model 18, becoming a performance leader for decades. In the 1950s, Ford introduced a three-tier approach to engines, with small, mid-sized, and larger engines aimed at different markets. All of Ford's mainstream V8 engines were replaced by the overhead cam Modular family in the 1990s and the company introduced a new large architecture, the Boss family, for 2010.

- 1920–1932 Lincoln 60 Degree Fork & Blade V8—(357.8 and 384.8 cu in (5.9 and 6.3 L))

The Fork and Blade V8 used a novel approach for the piston connecting rods, which meant two connecting rods shared one bearing on the crankshaft, which allowed for a short crankshaft and a smaller overall engine size.

- 1932–1953 Flathead V8
- 1940–1950 Ford GAA engine, exclusively for armored fighting vehicle military use
- 1952–1963 Lincoln Y-block V8 engine(317/341/368), HD truck (279/302/317/332)
- 1954–1964 Y-block V8—small-block Ford/Mercury/Edsel (239/256/272/292/312)
- 1958–1968 MEL V8—big-block Mercury/Edsel/Lincoln (383/410/430/462)
- 1958–1976 FE V8—medium-block Ford/Edsel
  - 1958–1971 Generation I (332/352/360/361/390)
  - 1962–1973 Generation II (406/410/427/428)
  - 1965–1968 Ford 427 side oiler
  - FT truck (330/359/361/389/391)
  - 427 SOHC**
- 1958–1981 Super Duty truck engine—big-block (401/477/534)
- 1962–2000 small-block (221/255/260/289/289HP/302/351W/Boss 302/427 aluminum)
- 1968–1997 385 V8—big-block (370/429/Boss 429/460/514)
- 1970–1982 335/Cleveland V8— small-block (351 Cleveland/400/351M/Boss 351)
  - 1969–1982 Ford Australia produced Cleveland V8 engines 302/351 (Geelong plant)
- 1983–2010 Ford/Navistar Diesel V8
  - 1983–1987—6.9 L IDI (indirect injection)
  - 1988–1993—7.3 L IDI
  - 1993–1994.5—7.3 L IDI with Turbo
  - 1994.5–2003.5—7.3 L DI (direct injection) "Power Stroke"
  - 2003.5–2009—6.0 L DI "Power Stroke" (E and F-series vehicles)
  - 2008–2010—6.4 L DI "Power Stroke" (F-series only)
- 1991–present Modular V8 —SOHC/DOHC 4.6/5.0/5.4/5.8 L
  - 1997–present Triton V8—truck versions of the Modular
  - 2003–2004 Terminator V8 DOHC Supercharged 4.6 L
  - 2010–2016 Ford Miami Coyote V8 based 5.0 L Supercharged DOHC VCT (on intake cams only) - Ford Australia Ford Performance Vehicles
  - 2011–present Coyote V8 —DOHC TiVCT 5.0 L; In 2018 dual fuel injection added providing both port and direct injection.
  - 2013–2014 Trinity V8 5.8 L, supercharged (Shelby GT500)
  - 2016–2020 Voodoo V8 —DOHC 5.2 L (Shelby GT350/350R)
  - 2020–2022 Predator V8 —DOHC 5.2 L, supercharged (Shelby GT500 & 2022 F-150 Raptor R)
  - 2023–present Carnivore V8 —DOHC 5.2 L, supercharged (2023 F-150 Raptor R)
- 1996–2020 Jaguar AJ-V8—small displacement DOHC V8 engine family also used by Lincoln LS and Ford Thunderbird
- 1996–1999 SHO V8—3.4 L DOHC 60° V8 designed and produced with Yamaha Motor Corporation. This engine was only used in the Taurus SHO V-8.
- 2005–2010 Volvo V8—4.4 L DOHC 60° V8 produced by Yamaha Motor Company in Japan in connection with Volvo Skövde Engine plant Sweden.
- 2006–present AJD-V8—DOHC 3.6 L twin-turbo Diesel
- 2009–2022 4.4 Turbo Diesel V8—DOHC 4.4 L twin-turbo Diesel
- 2010–2022 Boss V8—SOHC 6.2 L
- 2011–present Scorpion Diesel V8—"Power Stroke" OHV 6.7 L 32-valve DI turbo diesel (F-series only)
- 2020–present Godzilla V8 — Pushrod V8 7.3 L (445 cu in), gasoline, naturally aspirated, port fuel injected, variable timing, 16valve, 10.5:1 compression made for F-series Super Duty models.

== 10 cylinder ==
- 1997–2021Triton V10—6.8 L SOHC 90° Modular V10 truck engine
- 2001 5.8 L DOHC 90° Modular V10, 4 valves/cyl. (Experimental). Ford Powertrain Division.

== 12 cylinder ==
- 1932–1942 Lincoln L-head V12 (382/414/448)
- 1936–1948 Lincoln-Zephyr V12 (267/292/306)
- 1941 Ford V-12 aero engine
- 1941 Ford GAC V12
- 1995 Ford GT90 engine (used in the Ford GT90 concept car.)

== Motorsports ==
=== Open wheel racing ===
- 1963–1971 Ford Indy V8 engine (U.S.A.C. IndyCar engine)
- 1967-1983 Cosworth DFV—DOHC 3.0-liter Formula One racing engine
- 1975–2007 Ford-Cosworth Indy V8 engine (U.S.A.C. IndyCar engine)
- 1989–1993 Ford-Cosworth HB engine—DOHC 3.5 L (Formula One racing engine)
- 1994–1997 Ford-Cosworth EC / ED engine—DOHC 3.0/3.5 L (Formula One racing engine)
- 1999–2005 Ford-Cosworth JD / VJ engine (Formula One engine)
- 1999–2005 Ford-Cosworth CR engine (Formula One engine)

=== Stock car racing ===
- 1982–2008 Ford 351 Cleveland— small-block (NASCAR engine)
- 2009–present Ford FR9 (NASCAR engine)
