= Chihuahua Engine =

Engine factory in Chihuahua City, Mexico

Coordinates: 28.710°N 106.127°W

Chihuahua Engine is a 727,000-square-foot (67,500 m^{2}) engine factory in Chihuahua City, Mexico, owned by Ford Motor Company. The plant opened in 1983, encompasses 247 acres, and as of 2010 employs 1,264 workers. In the past it built Ford Penta and Zetec engines but currently builds the 1.5 L EcoBoost 'Dragon' engine, as well as the 2.0 L, 2.0 L HEV, 2.5 L and 2.5 L HEV versions of the Duratec I4. In 2010, the factory added capacity and began building the 6.7 L Power Stroke Diesel used in Ford Super Duty trucks and the 4.4 L diesel V8 for the Land Rover.

== Current products ==
- Ford EcoBoost engine
  - 1.5 L Dragon
- Ford Duratec engine
  - 2.5 L HEV
- Ford Power Stroke engine
  - 6.7 L

== Past products ==
- Ford HSC engine (Penta)
- Ford Zeta engine
- Ford 4.4 Turbo Diesel
  - 4.4 L
- Ford Duratec engine
  - 2.0 L
  - 2.0 L HEV
  - 2.5 L

== See also ==
- List of Ford factories
