= Ford AJD-V6/PSA DT17 =

Lion Diesel Engine Family
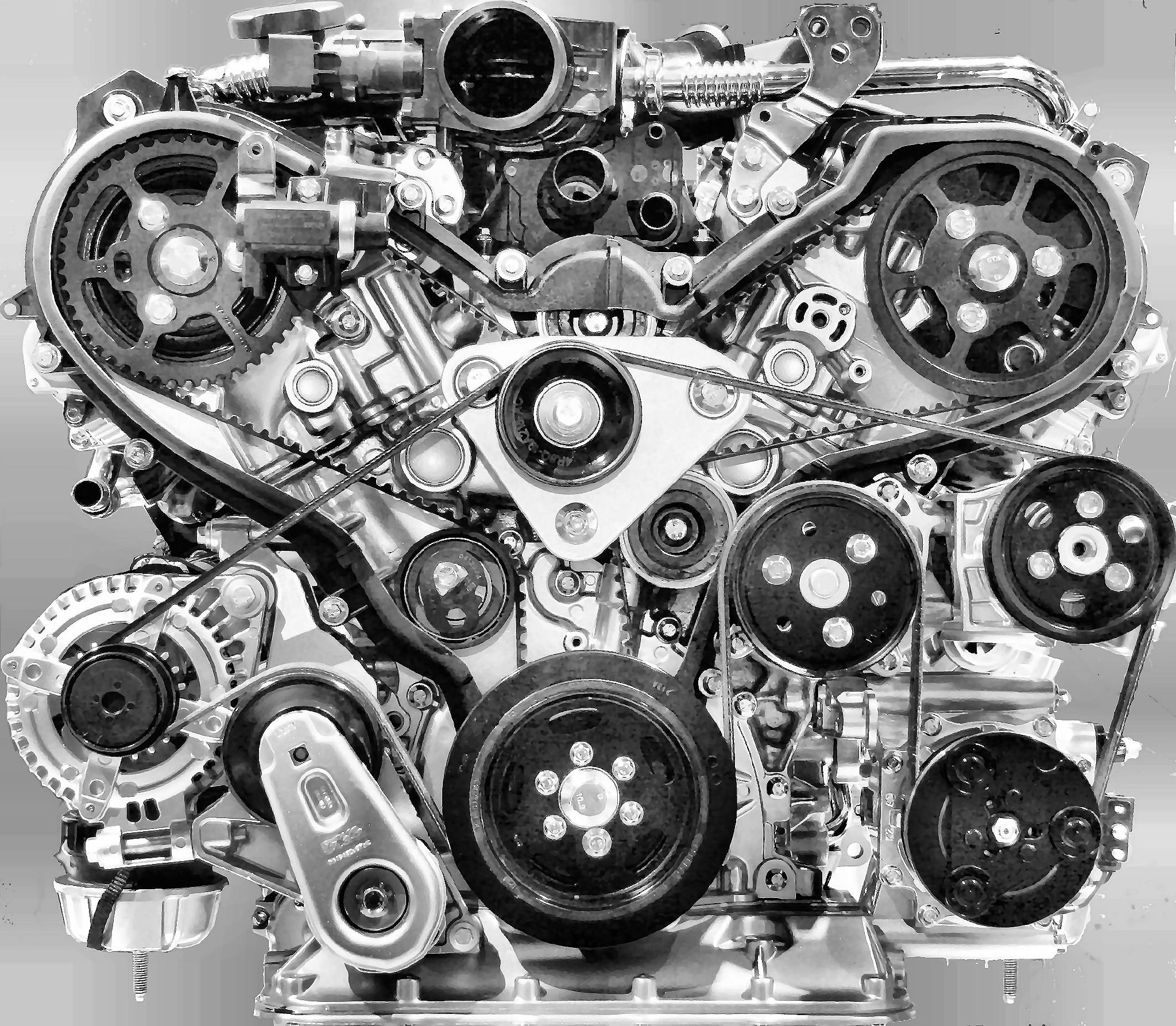

Overview
- Manufacturer: Ford of Europe; PSA Group; Jaguar Cars; Land Rover
- Production: 2004–present

Layout
- Configuration: 60° V6, 90° V8
- Displacement: 2.7 L (2,720 cc); 3.0 L (2,993 cc); 3.6 L (3,630 cc); 4.4 L (4,367 cc)
- Cylinder bore: 81 mm (3.19 in); 84 mm (3.31 in)
- Piston stroke: 88 mm (3.46 in); 90 mm (3.54 in)
- Cylinder block material: Compacted graphite iron cross bolted
- Cylinder head material: High strength aluminium
- Valvetrain: DOHC 4 valves x cyl. with VVT
- Compression ratio: 16.4:1, 17.3:1

Combustion
- Turbocharger: Variable geometry single or twin-turbo with air-to-air intercooler
- Fuel system: Common rail direct injection
- Management: Siemens
- Fuel type: Diesel
- Cooling system: Water cooled

Output
- Power output: 140–225 kW (190–306 PS; 188–302 hp)
- Torque output: 440–700 N⋅m (325–516 lbf⋅ft)

Dimensions
- Dry weight: 202 kg (445 lb)

The AJD/"Lion" is a family of V6 and V8 turbodiesel engines developed by Ford of Europe for its then-subsidiaries Jaguar and Land Rover, as well as for its then partner PSA Group working under the Gemini joint development and production agreement. The project to develop the engines was known as "Lion" and the engines are called the AJD-V6 in Jaguar and Land Rover vehicles and the DT17/DT20 by Citroën and Peugeot.

The engines use a clean-sheet design and variable valve timing, with the V6 and V8 sharing the same bore/stroke ratio, with the V6 version displacing 2.7 L (2,720 cc) and the V8 version displacing 3.6 L (3,630 cc). The V6 and the V8 were launched in 2004 and 2006 respectively. The V6 engine meets the Euro IV emissions standards. A DT20 3.0 L (2,993 cc) was added in 2009 and is based on the DT17 2.7 L (2,720 cc). The V6 is used across many vehicles, from the Citroën C5 and C6, to the Land Rover Discovery, Range Rover, multiple cars in the Jaguar range, and also the Ford Territory and next gen Ford Ranger.

== Common construction ==
The engine family utilises twin overhead camshafts and multi-valves, single or twin-turbochargers with an air-to-air intercooler, and innovative compacted graphite iron (CGI) block construction that leads to a low weight of 202 kg (445 lb) dry. Fuel supply is high-pressure common rail direct injection.

== Lion V6 ==
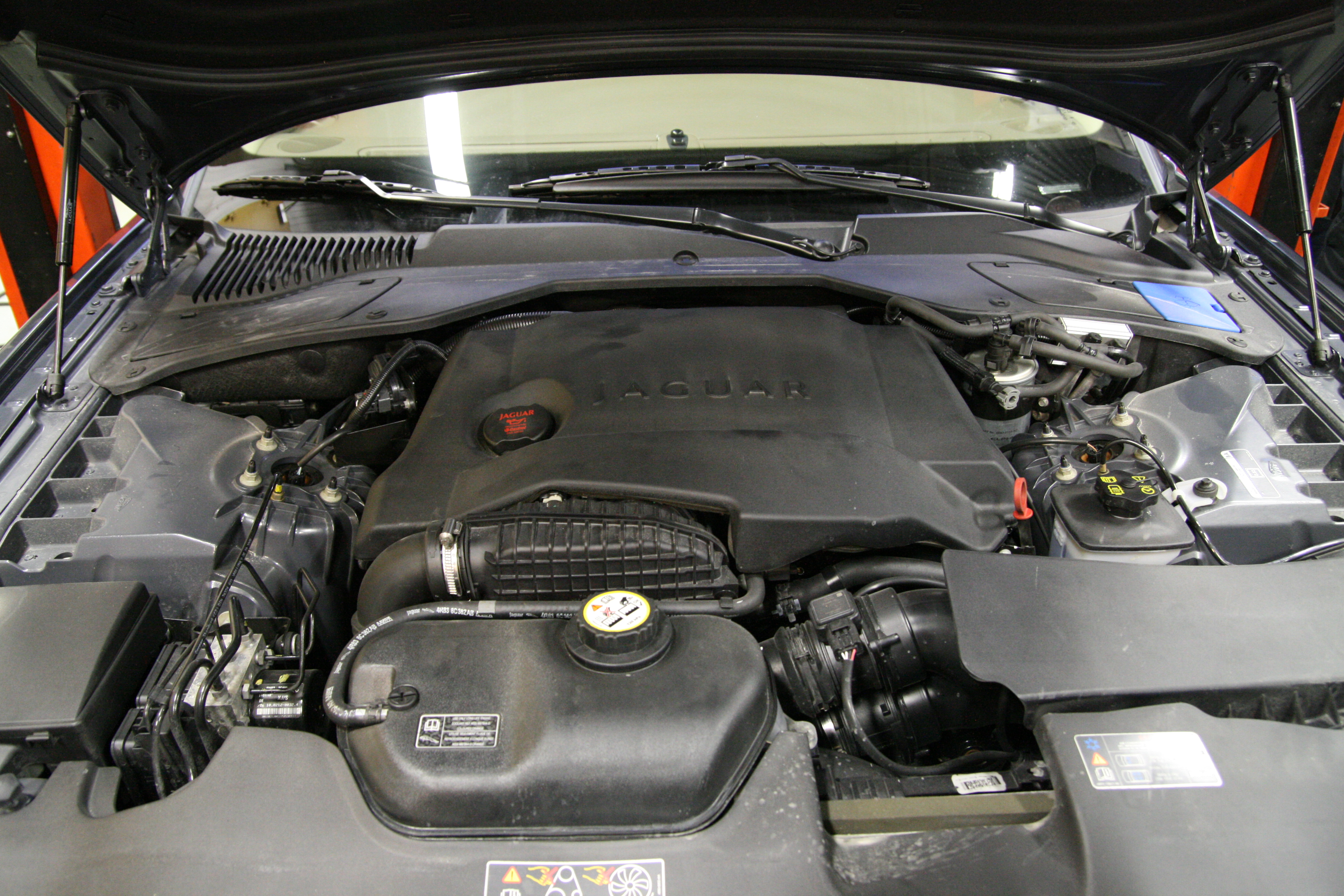
AJD-V6 engine in a 2006 Jaguar XJ

To improve the engine's low-speed torque range for off-roading and towing applications, the Land Rover variant utilised a large capacity single-turbocharger, rather than use the twin-turbo design; in addition the engine is fitted with a large engine driven cooling fan to support low speed, high load driving as may be encountered in desert conditions. Furthermore, the Land Rover variant of the Lion V6 includes a deeper, high capacity sump with improved baffles to maintain oil pressure at off-roading extreme angles and multi-layered seals to keep dust, mud and water at bay and different transmission bell housing bolt pattern. The Lion V6 – constructed from compacted graphite iron – is a member of the Ford Duratorq family and is produced at Ford's Dagenham engine plant; 35,000 engines were produced from April to December 2004.

The 3.0-litre design, known as the Gen III, superseded the 2.7-litre, and uses turbochargers on a series-sequential system and has an upgraded common rail injection system incorporating fuel injectors with piezo crystals fitted nearer to the tip to reduce engine noise and a metering mode to reduce oversupplying fuel, decreasing fuel consumption and unused fuel temperature over the 2.7-litre model. The sequential turbocharger system utilizes the smaller of the two turbos when the engine is running at low revolutions; once the engine has reached 2,800 rpm, the larger turbocharger is also used to pressurize the intake.

Jaguar tested fitting the engine to its XK model but didn't carry the project over to production.

The 3.0-litre variants used by Land Rover feature the 2.7-litre's off-roading adaptations plus calibration of the engine's electronics to allow the use of low-quality fuels.

=== 2.7HDi/TDV6/2.7TD ===
Engine configuration & engine displacement

60-degree V6 engine, single- and twin-turbo diesel, 2.7 L (2,720 cc; 166.0 cu in), bore x stroke 81 mm × 88 mm (3.19 in × 3.46 in), compression ratio 17.3:1

Cylinder block & crankcase

Compacted graphite iron cross bolted block

Cylinder heads & valvetrain

High strength aluminium, DOHC with four valves per cylinder

Aspiration

Single turbocharger or twin-turbochargers with air-to-air intercooler, electronically actuated variable geometry with transient over-boost capability, port deactivation system

Fuel system & engine management

Siemens Common rail (CR) direct diesel injection, maximum injection pressure of 1,650 bars (23,900 psi), piezo injectors

DIN-rated motive power & torque outputs
140 kW (190 PS; 188 hp), 440 N⋅m (325 lbf⋅ft) – Ford Territory, Land Rover Discovery 3, Range Rover Sport
150 kW (204 PS; 201 hp), 440 N⋅m (325 lbf⋅ft) – Citroën C5, Citroën C6, Jaguar S-Type, Jaguar XF, Jaguar XJ, Peugeot 407, Peugeot 607
References
"Ford, PSA Announce New V6 Diesel" Auto Report, 10 June 2003

=== 3.0HDi/TDV6/SDV6 ===
Engine configuration & engine displacement

60-degree V6 engine, twin-turbo diesel, 3.0 L (2,993 cc; 182.6 cu in), bore x stroke 84 mm × 90 mm (3.31 in × 3.54 in), compression ratio 16.4:1

Cylinder block & crankcase

Compacted graphite iron cross bolted block

Cylinder heads & valvetran

High strength aluminium, DOHC with 4 valves per cylinder

Aspiration

Twin-turbochargers with air-to-air intercooler, electronically actuated variable geometry with transient over-boost capability, port deactivation system

Fuel system & engine management

Bosch Common rail (CR) direct diesel injection, utilising a Bosch EDC17CP11 engine management control unit and maximum injection pressure of 2,000 bars (29,000 psi), piezo injectors

DIN-rated motive power & torque outputs
180 kW (245 PS; 241 hp), 450 N⋅m (332 lbf⋅ft) – Citroën C5, Citroën C6, Peugeot 407, Peugeot 407 Coupé
180 kW (245 PS; 241 hp), 500 N⋅m (369 lbf⋅ft) – Jaguar XF, Land Rover Discovery 4, Range Rover Sport
190 kW (258 PS; 255 hp), 600 N⋅m (443 lbf⋅ft) – Land Rover Discovery 4, Discovery 5, Range Rover Sport
202 kW (275 PS; 271 hp), 600 N⋅m (443 lbf⋅ft) – Jaguar XF, Jaguar XJ, Range Rover
221 kW (300 PS; 296 hp), 700 N⋅m (516 lbf⋅ft) – Jaguar XF X250, Jaguar XF X260, Jaguar XJ, Range Rover Velar, Jaguar F-Pace
225 kW (306 PS; 302 hp), 700 N⋅m (516 lbf⋅ft) – Range Rover Sport, Discovery 5

== Lion V8 ==
Built at Ford's Dagenham engine plant in Essex, the 3.6-litre V8 twin-turbo diesel engine began production in April 2006. The 4.4 L variant is built in Ford's Chihuahua Engine plant in Mexico.

Much speculation in the United States was focused on this engine as a possible Diesel entrant in the F-150 pickup truck and Expedition SUV. It was announced that the new F-150 engine was to be based on this engine and enlarged to 4.4 L, but that program was later cancelled. The Cleveland Engine plant recently began small-scale production of the exotic compacted graphite iron (CGI) used in the block's construction, leading many to expect production of the engine there. Ultimately, Ford went with the 3.0 L Lion V6 modified for US truck use, utilising a single turbocharger.

=== 3.6 TDV8 ===
Engine configuration & engine displacement

90-degree V8 engine, twin-turbo diesel, 3.6 L (3,630 cc; 221.5 cu in), bore x stroke 81 mm × 88 mm (3.19 in × 3.46 in), compression ratio 17.3:1

Cylinder block & crankcase

Compacted graphite iron cross bolted block

Cylinder heads & valvetrain

High strength aluminium, DOHC with 4 valves per cylinder

Aspiration

Twin-turbochargers with air-to-air intercooler, electronically actuated variable geometry with transient over-boost capability, maximum boost pressure of 1.6 bars (23 psi), piezo injectors

DIN-rated motive power & torque outputs
200 kW (272 PS; 268 hp), 640 N⋅m (472 lbf⋅ft) – Range Rover, Range Rover Sport

== See also ==
- List of Ford engines
