= Ford 4.4 Turbo Diesel =

Overview
- Manufacturer: Ford Motor Company
- Production: 2009–2022

Layout
- Displacement: 4.4 L; 266.5 cu in (4,367 cc)
- Cylinder bore: 84 mm (3.31 in)
- Piston stroke: 98.5 mm (3.88 in)
- Cylinder block material: Compacted graphite iron

Combustion
- Turbocharger: Yes
- Fuel system: Common rail direct injection
- Fuel type: Diesel
- Cooling system: Water-cooled

Output
- Power output: 335 hp (250 kW; 340 PS)
- Specific power: 76.7 hp (57.2 kW; 77.8 PS) per litre
- Torque output: 700 N⋅m (516 lb⋅ft)

The Ford 4.4 TD is a diesel V8 engine developed and built by Ford Motor Company. It has a power output of 340 PS (250 kW; 335 hp) and 700 N⋅m (516 lb⋅ft) of torque. As with the other AJDs, it has a compacted graphite iron block that reduces weight while increasing engine block strength. Its bore diameter and stroke are 84 mm × 98.5 mm (3.31 in × 3.88 in), giving a displacement of 4.4 L; 266.5 cu in (4,367 cc).

The 4.4 L (4,367 cc) was built at Chihuahua Engine plant in Chihuahua City, Mexico, along with the 6.7L Ford Power Stroke Diesel engine available in Ford Super Duty trucks. The only applications of the 4.4 L (4,367 cc) TD engine were the Range Rover and Range Rover Sport.

While in development, the 4.4 TD was rumored to be for use in the Ford F-150, Ford Expedition, and as an entry-level diesel option for the Super Duty (to possibly compete with the also-rumored cancelled concept 4.5 L Duramax). No such option ever became available with Ford citing the reason as being in low demand for a vehicle with a $6000–$8000 premium over its gasoline models.

== See also ==
- Ford AJD-V6/PSA DT17#Lion V8, Ford Lion V8
- List of Ford engines

== Sources ==
- "Ford mulls new 4.4-litre diesel for F-Series trucks". DieselForecast.com. Archived from the original on October 18, 2006.
- "Raising the Bar: Ford to introduce F-150 with diesel engine by 2009". AutoWeek. Archived from the original on September 29, 2007.
