= Ingenium engine family =

Ingenium
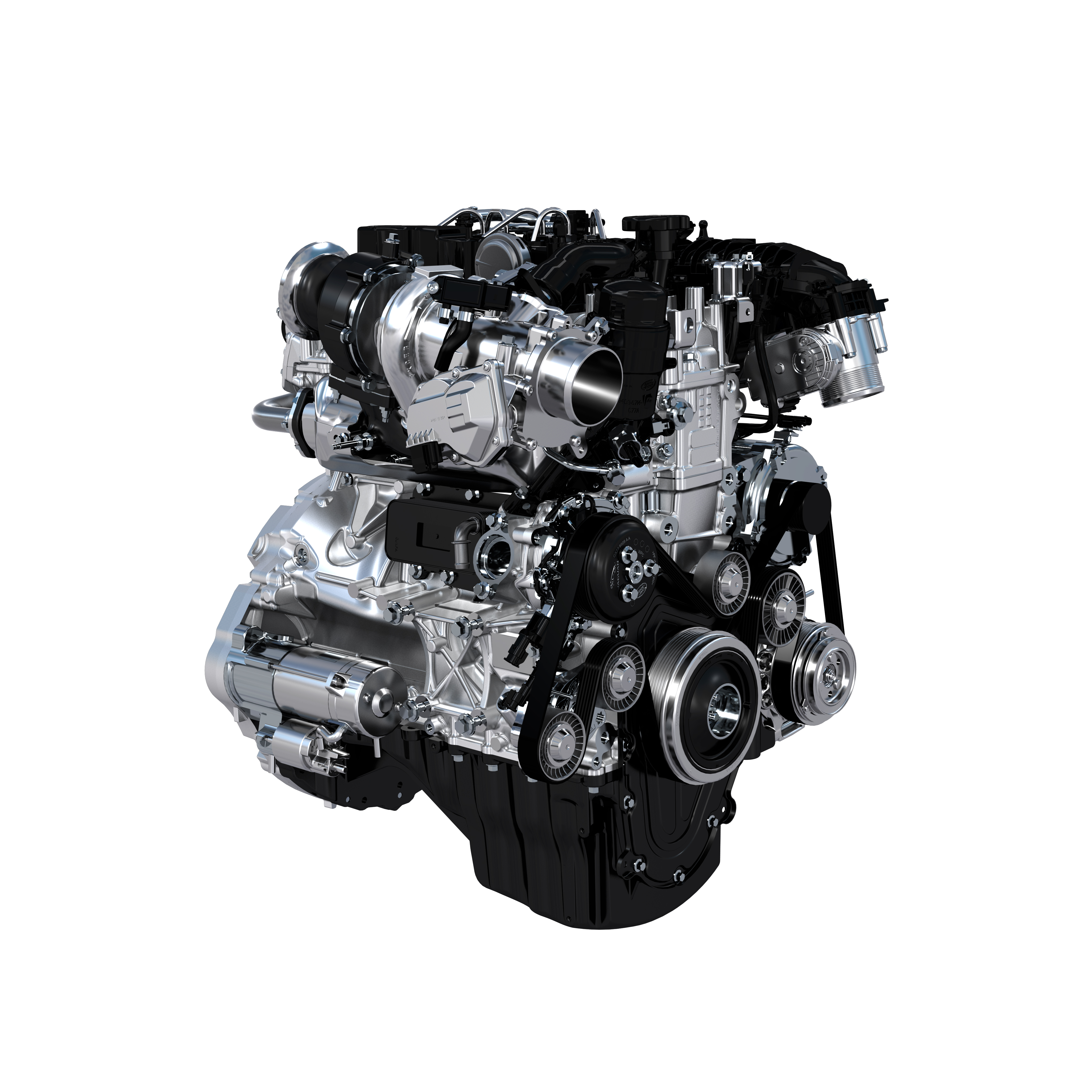

Overview
- Manufacturer: Jaguar Land Rover
- Production: Jaguar Land Rover Engine Manufacturing Centre, UK: 2015–present Joint-venture – Chery Jaguar Land Rover, China: 2017–present

Layout
- Configuration: Inline-3, Inline-4, Inline-6
- Displacement: Inline 3: 1.5 L (1,499 cc), Inline 4: 2.0 L (1,999 cc), Inline 6: 3.0 L (2,997 cc)
- Cylinder bore: 83 mm (3.3 in)
- Piston stroke: 92.3 mm (3.6 in)
- Cylinder block material: Aluminium alloy, cast iron liners
- Cylinder head material: Aluminium alloy, integrated exhaust manifold
- Valvetrain: 4 valves / cylinder, DOHC, chain-drive, electrohydraulic fully variable intake and exhaust valve lift system
- Compression ratio: Petrol: 10.5:1; Diesel: 15.5:1

Combustion
- Supercharger: 48V electric supercharger (MHEV)
- Turbocharger: Single twin-scroll turbocharger, or two twin-scroll turbochargers, or single twin-scroll turbocharger with additional 48 V electric supercharger (inline-6); ceramic ball bearings
- Fuel system: Petrol: 200 bar solenoid direct injection, centrally-mounted; Diesel: 1,800 bar common rail injection
- Fuel type: Petrol, Diesel
- Oil system: Wet sump, variable flow pump, computer-controlled oil pump
- Cooling system: Water-cooled, computer-controlled water pump

Emissions
- Emissions target standard: Euro 6 (b,d); SULEV, MHEV, PHEV

Chronology
- Predecessor: Ford Duratec / Jaguar AJ126 V6 (Petrol); Ford Duratorq / PSA DW Family (Diesel)

Ingenium is a range of modular engines produced by Jaguar Land Rover, in both petrol and diesel variants. It uses a modular architecture so that it can be made in three-, four- and six-cylinder versions (built around individual 500 cc cylinders), depending on demand and requirements. Since late 2025 the Ingenium engine line has replaced engines sourced from Ford.

The Ingenium design is configurable and flexible for longitudinal and transverse architectures and for front, rear, and all-wheel drive, together with auto and manual transmissions. Hybrid variants are set to be released in the future. Both single- and twin-turbo boosting solutions from BorgWarner are used. Particular emphasis has been placed on achieving exceptionally low internal friction, which is described as being 17% less than a current 2.2-litre diesel. "Other details include roller bearings on cam and balancer shafts instead of machined-in bearing surfaces, computer-controlled variable oil and water pumps, a split circuit cooling system enabling fast warm ups, a simplified cam drive system, crankshafts that are offset from the centre of the block and electronically controlled piston cooling jets to improve efficiency in the oil pumping circuit."

In 2017, Jaguar Land Rover licensed the Multiair/UniAir electrohydraulic variable valve lift system from Schaeffler Group, which Schaeffler in turn licensed from Fiat Chrysler Automobiles in 2011. The system, developed by Fiat Powertrain Technologies, is a hydraulically actuated variable valve timing (VVT) technology enabling "cylinder by cylinder, stroke by stroke" control of intake air directly via a gasoline engine's inlet valves.

In February 2019, Jaguar Land Rover announced their long-rumoured inline-six engine. Instead of being a conventional engine, the new 3.0 L petrol inline-six motor is combined with a 48 volt electric architecture to support an electric supercharger, belt starter-generator and extended engine shut offs while coasting and/or while stopped in traffic. The new engine is initially being offered in the Range Rover Sport in two power outputs, 360 PS (265 kW; 355 hp) and 400 PS (294 kW; 395 hp). Both are considered to be mild hybrid electric vehicles.

== Engine family list ==
Petrol
Engine ID	Displacement	Power@rpm	Torque@rpm	Year	Features	Applications
AJ150	1,499 cc (91.4 cu in)	118 kW (160 PS) (P160); 147 kW (200 PS) (P300e)	260 N⋅m (192 lb⋅ft) (P160); 280 N⋅m (207 lb⋅ft) (P300e)	2019–present	DOHC I3, turbocharger, MHEV (P160) & PHEV (P300e)	Land Rover Range Rover Evoque, Discovery Sport
AJ200	1,999 cc (122 cu in)	147 kW (200 PS)	320 N⋅m (236 lb⋅ft)	2016–present	DOHC I4, turbocharger	Jaguar XE; Land Rover Discovery Sport
AJ200	1,999 cc (122 cu in)	180 kW (245 PS) at 5,500	365 N⋅m (269 lb⋅ft) at 1,200 – 4,500	2016–present	DOHC I4, turbocharger	Jaguar XE, XF, XJ, E-Pace, F-Pace; Land Rover Range Rover Evoque, Range Rover Velar
AJ200	1,997 cc (121.9 cu in)	221 kW (300 PS) at 5,500	400 N⋅m (295 lb⋅ft) at 1,500 – 4,000	2017–present	DOHC I4, twin-scroll turbochargers, electrohydraulic valvetrain	Jaguar F-Type, E-Pace; Land Rover Range Rover Evoque, Discovery, Defender, Range Rover Sport
AJ200	1,997 cc (121.9 cu in)	297 kW (404 PS)	640 N⋅m (472 lb⋅ft)	2017–present	DOHC I4, twin-scroll turbochargers, electrohydraulic valvetrain, PHEV (P400e)	Land Rover Range Rover, Range Rover Sport, Defender
AJ300	2,996 cc (182.9 cu in)	250–265 kW (340–360 PS)	495 N⋅m (365 lb⋅ft)	2020–present	DOHC I6, twincharged, MHEV	Jaguar F-Pace; Land Rover Range Rover, Range Rover Sport, Range Rover Velar, Discovery
AJ300	2,996 cc (182.9 cu in)	294 kW (400 PS) at 5500	550 N⋅m (406 lb⋅ft) at 2,000 – 5,000	2019–present	DOHC I6, twincharged, MHEV	Jaguar F-Pace; Land Rover Range Rover, Range Rover Sport, Range Rover Velar, Defender
AJ300	2,996 cc (182.9 cu in)	324 kW (441 PS) at 5500	620 N⋅m (457 lb⋅ft) at 2,000 – 5,000	2022–present	DOHC I6, turbocharger, PHEV	Land Rover Range Rover, Range Rover Sport P440e
AJ300	2,996 cc (182.9 cu in)	375 kW (510 PS) at 5500	700 N⋅m (516 lb⋅ft) at 2,000 – 5,000	2022–present	DOHC I6, turbocharger, PHEV	Land Rover Range Rover, Range Rover Sport P510e
Diesel
AJ200D	1,999 cc (122 cu in)	110 kW (150 PS) at 4,000	380 N⋅m (280 lb⋅ft) at 1,750 – 2,500	2015–present	DOHC I4, turbocharger, _{2}	Jaguar E-Pace; Land Rover Discovery Sport, Range Rover Evoque
AJ200D	1,999 cc (122 cu in)	120 kW (163 PS) at 4,000	380 N⋅m (280 lb⋅ft) at 1,750 – 2,500	2015–present	DOHC I4, turbocharger, _{2}	Jaguar XE, XF, F-Pace; Land Rover Discovery Sport
AJ200D	1,999 cc (122 cu in)	132 kW (179 PS) at 4,000	430 N⋅m (317 lb⋅ft) at 1,750 – 2,500	2015–present	DOHC I4, turbocharger	Jaguar XE, E-Pace, F-Pace; Land Rover Range Rover Evoque; Range Rover Velar
AJ200D	1,999 cc (122 cu in)	147 kW (200 PS) at 4,000	430 N⋅m (317 lb⋅ft) at 1,750 – 2,500	2015–present	DOHC I4, turbocharger, _{2}	Land Rover Defender; Range Rover Velar
AJ200D	1,999 cc (122 cu in)	177 kW (241 PS) at 4,000	500 N⋅m (369 lb⋅ft) at 1,500 - 2,500	2017–present	DOHC I4, turbocharger	Jaguar XE, XF, E-Pace, F-Pace; Land Rover Discovery; Range Rover Evoque; Range Rover Velar
AJ300D	2,997 cc (182.9 cu in)	147 kW (200 PS)	570 N⋅m (420 lb⋅ft) at 1,250 – 2,250	2020–present	DOHC I6, turbocharger, MHEV	Land Rover Defender
AJ300D	2,997 cc (182.9 cu in)	183 kW (249 PS)	600 N⋅m (443 lb⋅ft) at 1,250 – 2,250	2020–present	DOHC I6, turbocharger, MHEV	Land Rover Range Rover; Range Rover Sport
AJ300D	2,997 cc (182.9 cu in)	221 kW (300 PS)	650 N⋅m (479 lb⋅ft) at 1,500 – 2,500	2020–present	DOHC I6, turbocharger, MHEV	Land Rover Range Rover; Range Rover Sport; Jaguar F Pace
AJ300D	2,997 cc (182.9 cu in)	257 kW (349 PS)	700 N⋅m (516 lb⋅ft) at 1,500 – 3,000	2020–present	DOHC I6, turbocharger, MHEV	Land Rover Range Rover; Range Rover Sport

== See also ==
- MultiAir
- Jaguar AJ-V8
- Land Rover engines
