= Jaguar Land Rover Engine Manufacturing Centre =

Automotive factory in Wolverhampton, England

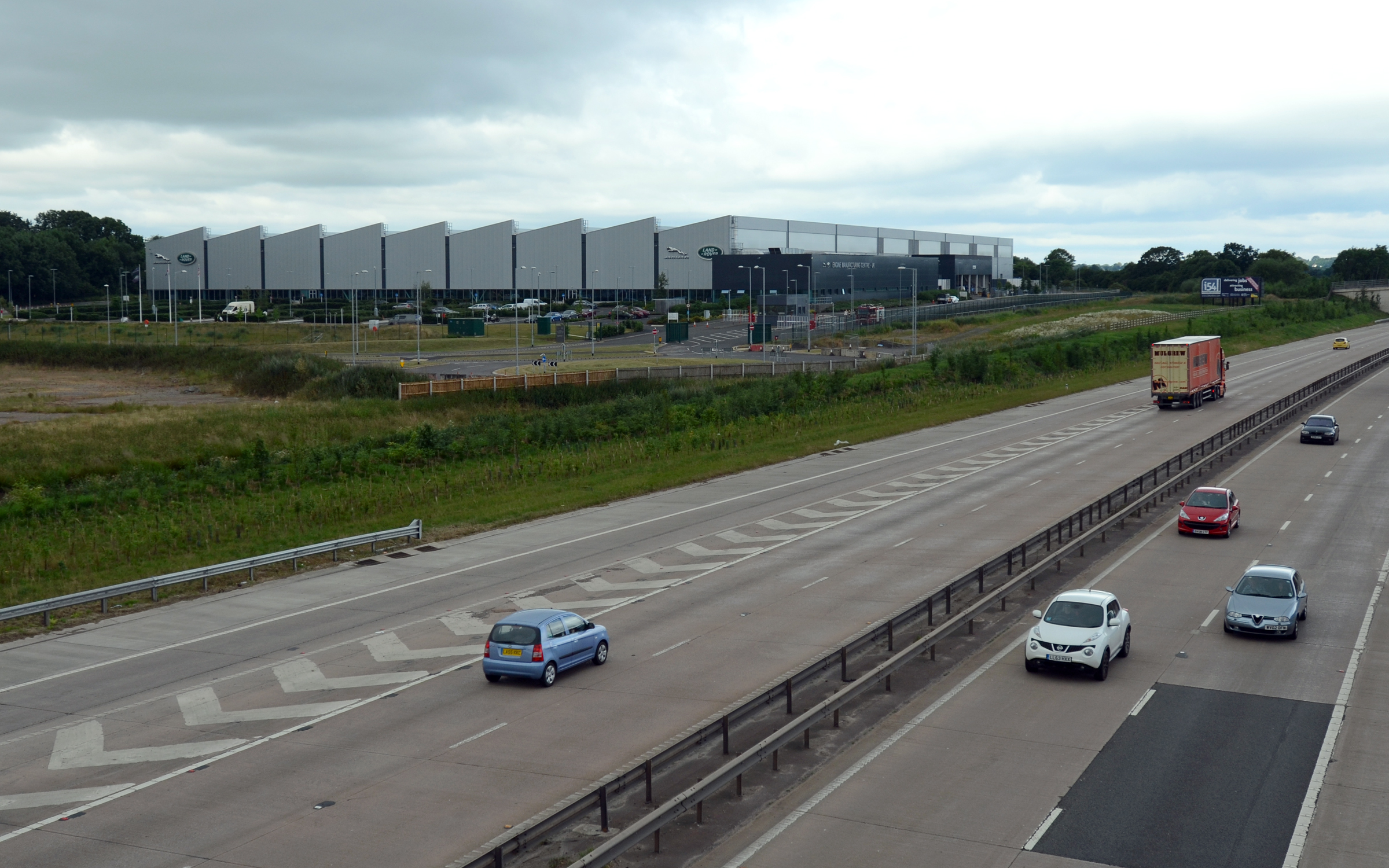
- Jaguar Land Rover Engine Manufacturing Centre and the M54 motorway
- Built: 2014
- Location: Bilbrook, Staffordshire, England
- Coordinates: 52.634°N 2.145°W
- Industry: Automotive
- Products: Ingenium diesel engines; Ingenium petrol engines (as of mid-2016)
- Employees: 700
- Area: Currently being expanded to 200,000 m^{2} (2,200,000 ft^{2})

Jaguar Land Rover Engine Manufacturing Centre is an engine producing factory located on the outskirts of Wolverhampton and South Staffordshire, England, adjacent to the M54 motorway on the i54 business park. Opened in 2014 by Elizabeth II, it produces Ingenium petrol and diesel engines.

Having already been expanded once in the past, in 2015 it was announced that Jaguar Land Rover would spend £450 million on doubling the size of the engine plant. Once complete, the factory's workforce will increase from 700 to 1,400 people.

In 2024, it was confirmed that the plant is being converted into the Electric Propulsion Manufacturing Centre to provide electric drive units and batteries for the next generation of Jaguar vehicles.

== Solar panels ==
The engine assembly plant is fitted with over 21,000 photovoltaic panels, which produce 5.8 MW (7,800 hp) of energy. This accounts for more than 30% of the plant's energy requirements. The panels are estimated to reduce the plant's carbon footprint by over 2,400 tonnes per year.
