= Freelander =

Car brand owned by the Chery Jaguar Land Rover joint venture

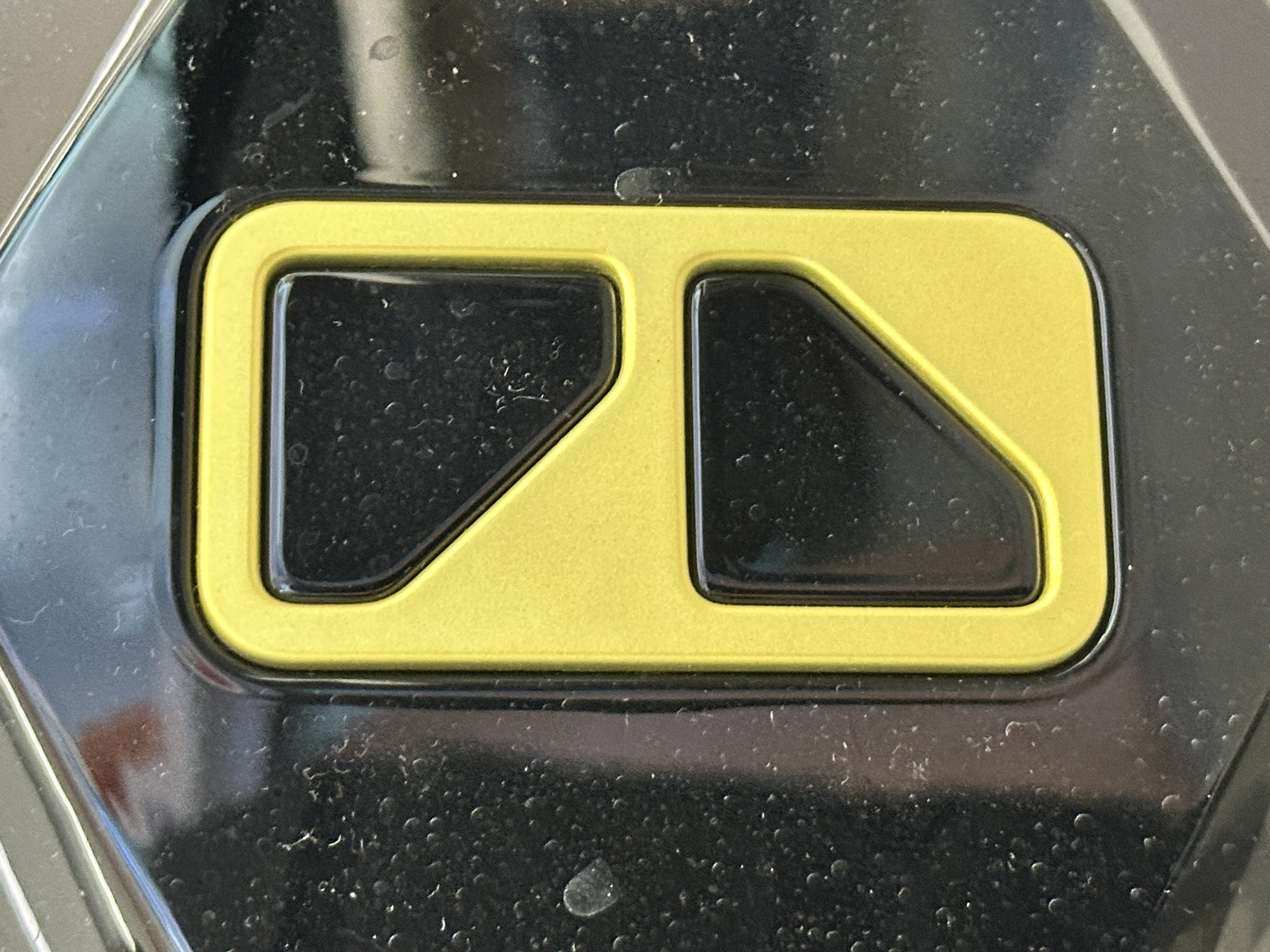
- Current owner: Jaguar Land Rover
- Produced by: Chery Jaguar Land Rover
- Country: China; Middle East
- Introduced: 2026
- Website: freelander-ev.com

Freelander is a vehicle marque announced by Jaguar Land Rover in June 2024, and licensed to the Chery Jaguar Land Rover joint venture for a range of new cars. The name comes from the previous Land Rover Freelander model, which was sold from 1997 to 2015.

Initially planned to use Chery's EV architecture and set to launch initially in China, there are plans for global model exports. The first production intent car Freelander 8 was shown as a hybrid car in April 2026.

== History ==
In 2024 Jaguar Land Rover and Chery announced they would build Freelander-branded electric vehicles in their existing factory in Changshu, China. Chery would handle engineering and development while JLR would design the cars. Freelander will be separate from the brand portfolios of both Chery and JLR.

In 2025, they announced three new cars for the brand, the first to be unveiled will be a large six-seater hybrid SUV developed under the codename E0V. The vehicle was initially planned for Chery's Exeed brand, but later transferred to the new brand.

The Freelander Concept 97 was unveiled on 31 March 2026, alongside the Freelander marque itself. The Concept 97 serves as a preview of the Freelander 8. A month later on 25 April, the production intent version was unveiled.

== Products ==
=== Current models ===
- Freelander 8 (2026–present) full-size SUV, EREV
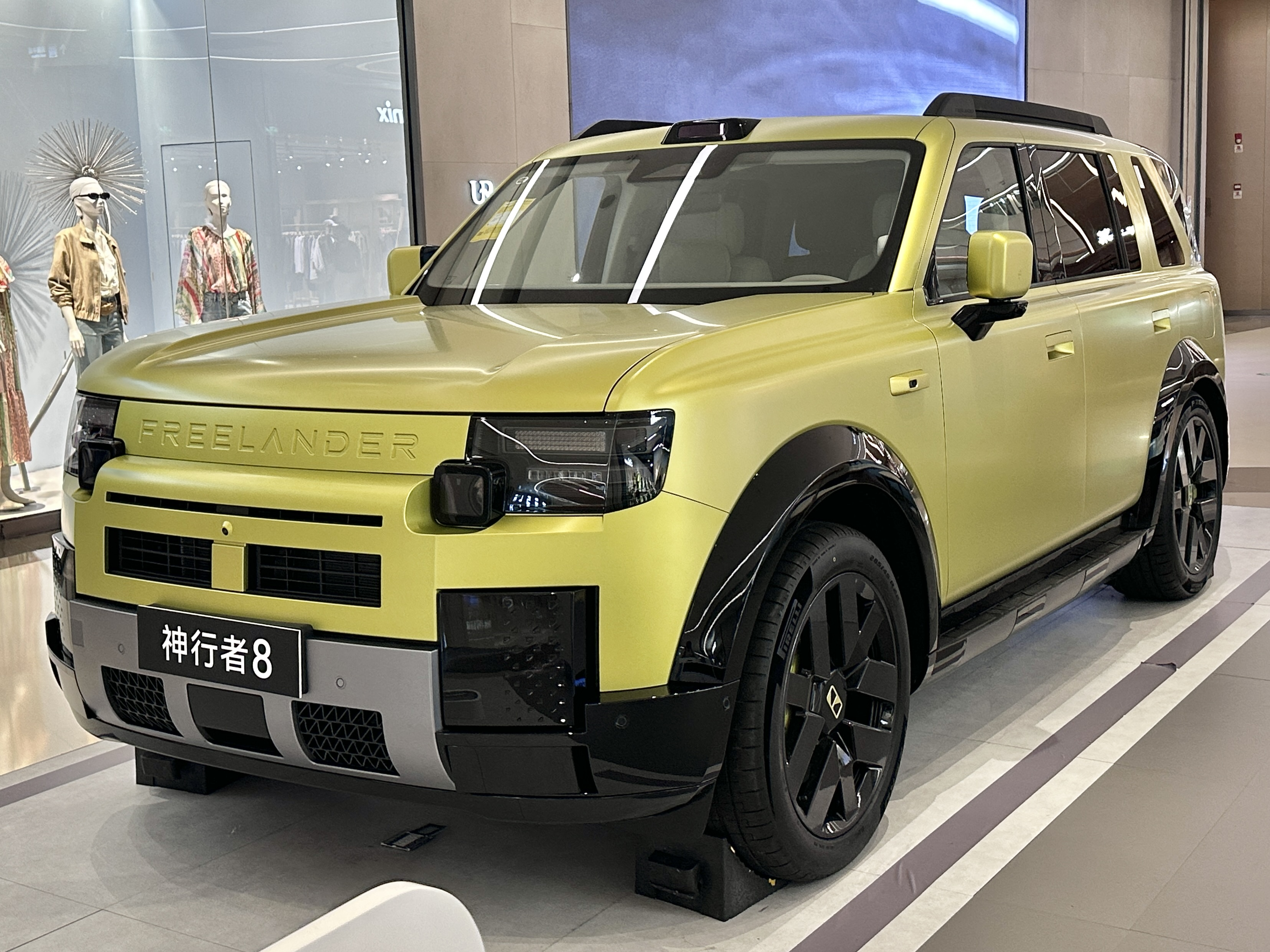
Freelander 8

=== Concept ===
- Freelander Concept 97 (2026), named after the original launch year of the Land Rover Freelander.
