= Freelander 8 =

Full-size SUV

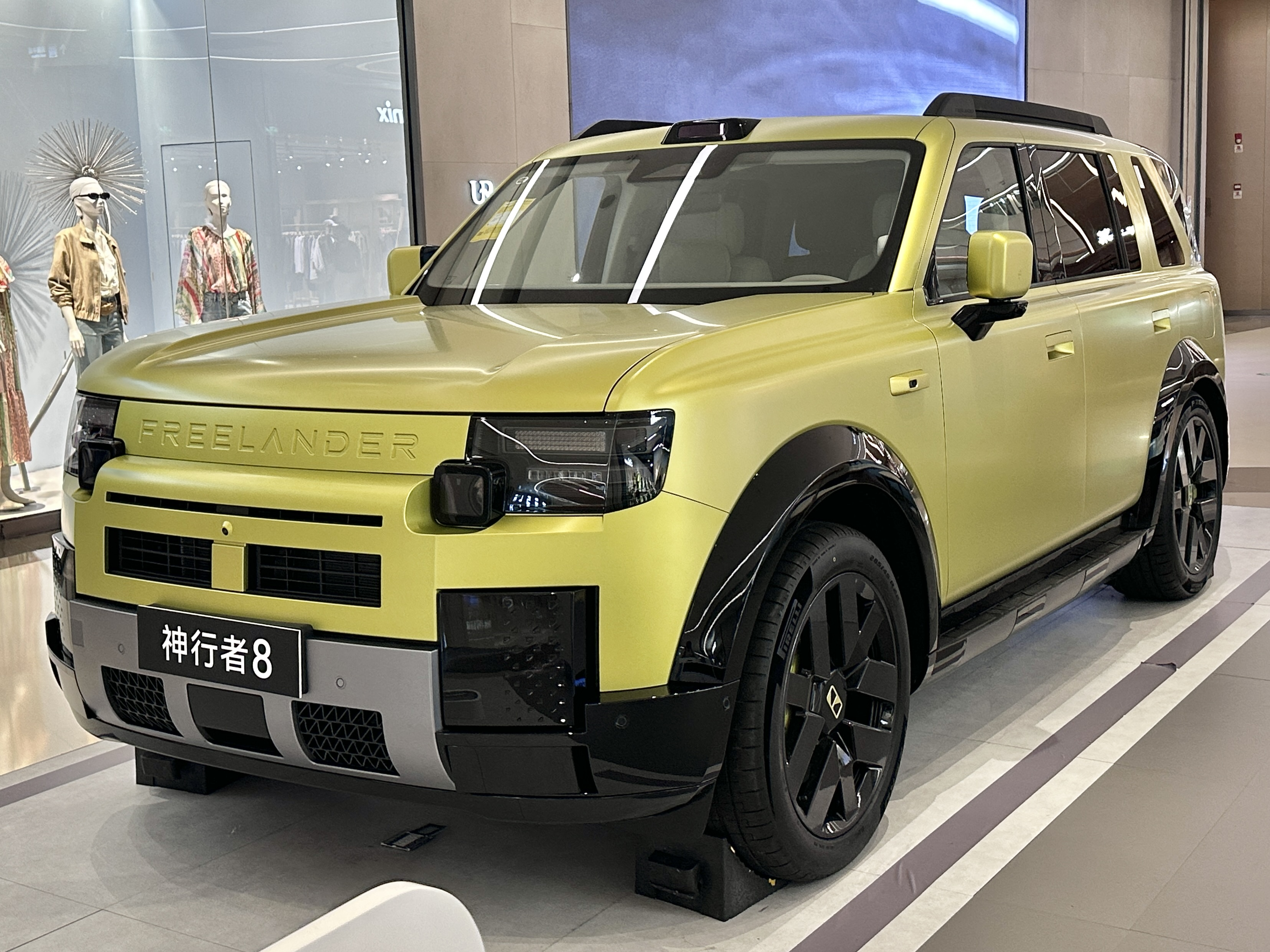

Overview
- Manufacturer: Chery Jaguar Land Rover
- Model code: E0V
- Production: July 2026 – present
- Assembly: China: Changshu (Chery Jaguar Land Rover)
- Designer: Gerry McGovern

Body and chassis
- Class: Full-size SUV
- Body style: 5-door SUV
- Layout: Front-engine, dual-motor, all-wheel-drive
- Platform: Chery E0X Platform
- Chassis: Unibody
- Related: Chery Fulwin T11; Exeed Sterra ET / EX7; Luxeed R7

Powertrain
- Engine: 1.5 L SQRH4J15 turbo I4
- Electric motor: 2× PMSM
- Power output: 610 kW (829 PS; 818 hp)
- Transmission: Single-speed gear reduction (front); 2-speed gearbox (rear)
- Hybrid drivetrain: Series (range extender)
- Battery: 60.331 kWh Freevoy NMC CATL
- Electric range: 221 km (137 mi) (EREV; WLTP); 310 km (190 mi) (EREV; CLTC)
- Plug-in charging: DC: 350 kW, 20–80%: 12 minutes

Dimensions
- Wheelbase: 3,040 mm (119.7 in)
- Length: 5,118 mm (201.5 in)
- Width: 2,050 mm (80.7 in)
- Height: 1,898 mm (74.7 in)
- Kerb weight: 2,980 kg (6,570 lb)

The Freelander 8 (Chinese: 神行者8; pinyin: Shénxíngzhě 8; lit. 'Divine traveler 8') is a full-size SUV, it will be the first vehicle sold under the Freelander marque. It is developed by Chery and produced at the Chery Jaguar Land Rover plant in Changshu. It is available with battery electric, range-extended, and plug-in hybrid powertrains.

== History ==
On 19 June 2024, Jaguar Land Rover partnered with Chery to build new vehicles on the latter's E0X platform under the Freelander brand. Prior to this announcement JLR had said it would use the E0X and M3X platforms for plug-in hybrids and battery electric vehicles. A letter of intent for building vehicles under the Freelander brand was signed on the same day.

The Freelander 8 was originally developed for Chery's Exeed marque under the codename E0V. An early design was revealed on November 12, 2024, before the project was transferred to the Freelander brand.

On 29 April 2025, it was revealed that a trademark for Freelander was filed in Australia. On 14 May 2025, it was confirmed that it would arrive as a plug-in hybrid initially and that it would be styled by Gerry McGovern, then-chief creative officer of Jaguar Land Rover.

The first spyshots of the Freelander 8 were released on 1 August 2025, when a prototype was spotted testing in Suzhou. By November 2025, 150 Freelander 8 prototypes were built by JLR and Chery.

On 21 January 2026, it was confirmed that the brand would first launch in the Middle East due to a shift in the Freelander marque's strategy. On 24 March 2026, it was announced that the Freelander brand would be revealed in Shanghai on 31 March. The Freelander 8 was accidentally unveiled via crash test photos on 26 March 2026. Official teasers for the Freelander Concept 97 were shown on the same day that the reveal date was announced.

The Freelander Concept 97 was unveiled on 31 March 2026, alongside the Freelander marque itself. The Concept 97 serves as a preview of the Freelander 8, featuring a design influenced by the original Land Rover Freelander. Its hood, grille, and skid plate are finished in aluminium.

On 25 April 2026, the production version was unveiled as the Freelander 8.

The Freelander 8 went on sale in China on 3 September 2026, with the five-seater model beginning deliveries on 31 October 2026.

The Freelander 8 was unveiled in Abu Dhabi, in the Middle East, on 29 September 2026, and is expected to go on sale in the UAE in the first quarter of 2027.

== Overview ==
The Freelander 8 serves as the first model of the Freelander marque. It is a full-size SUV.

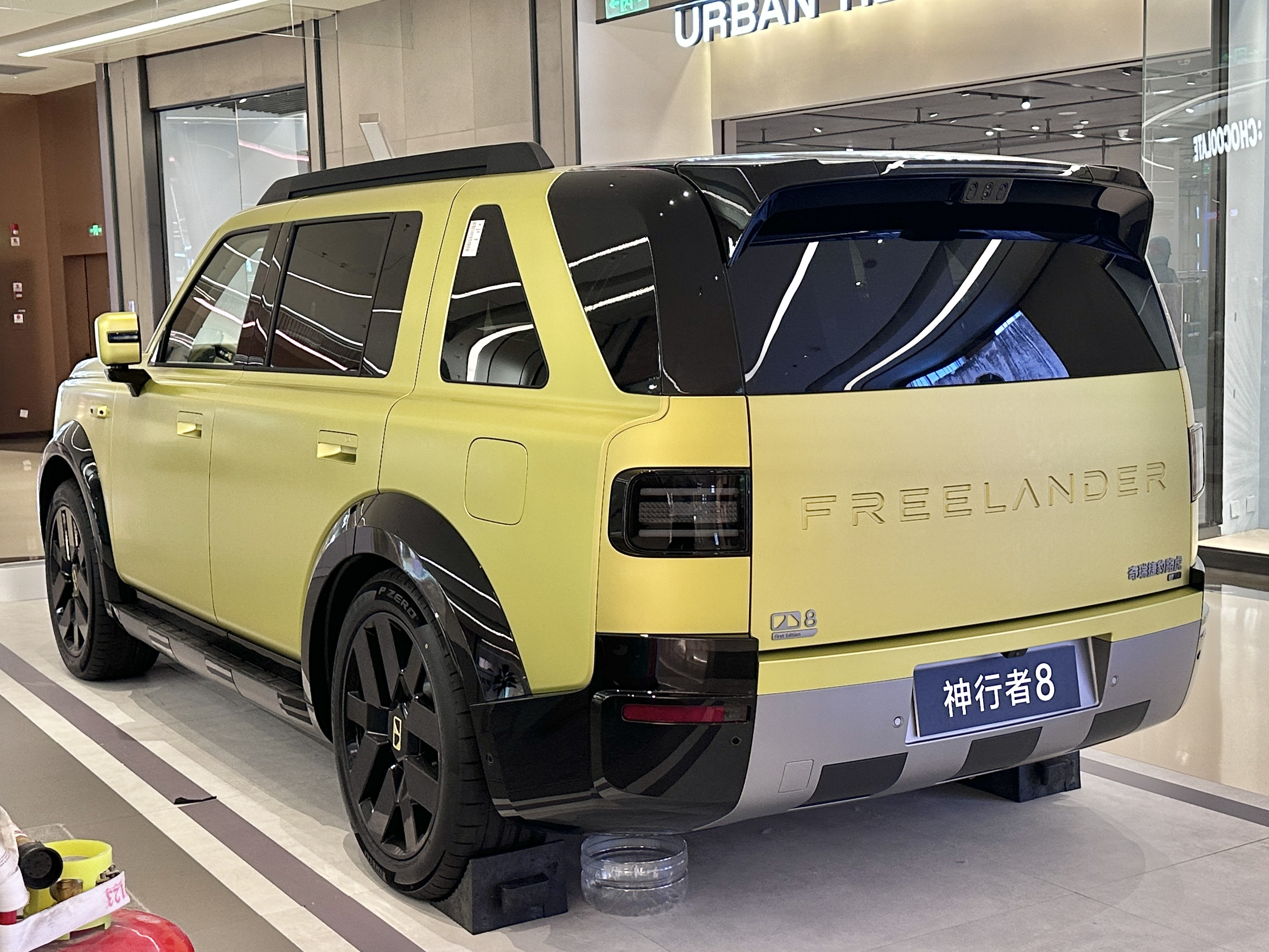
Rear view

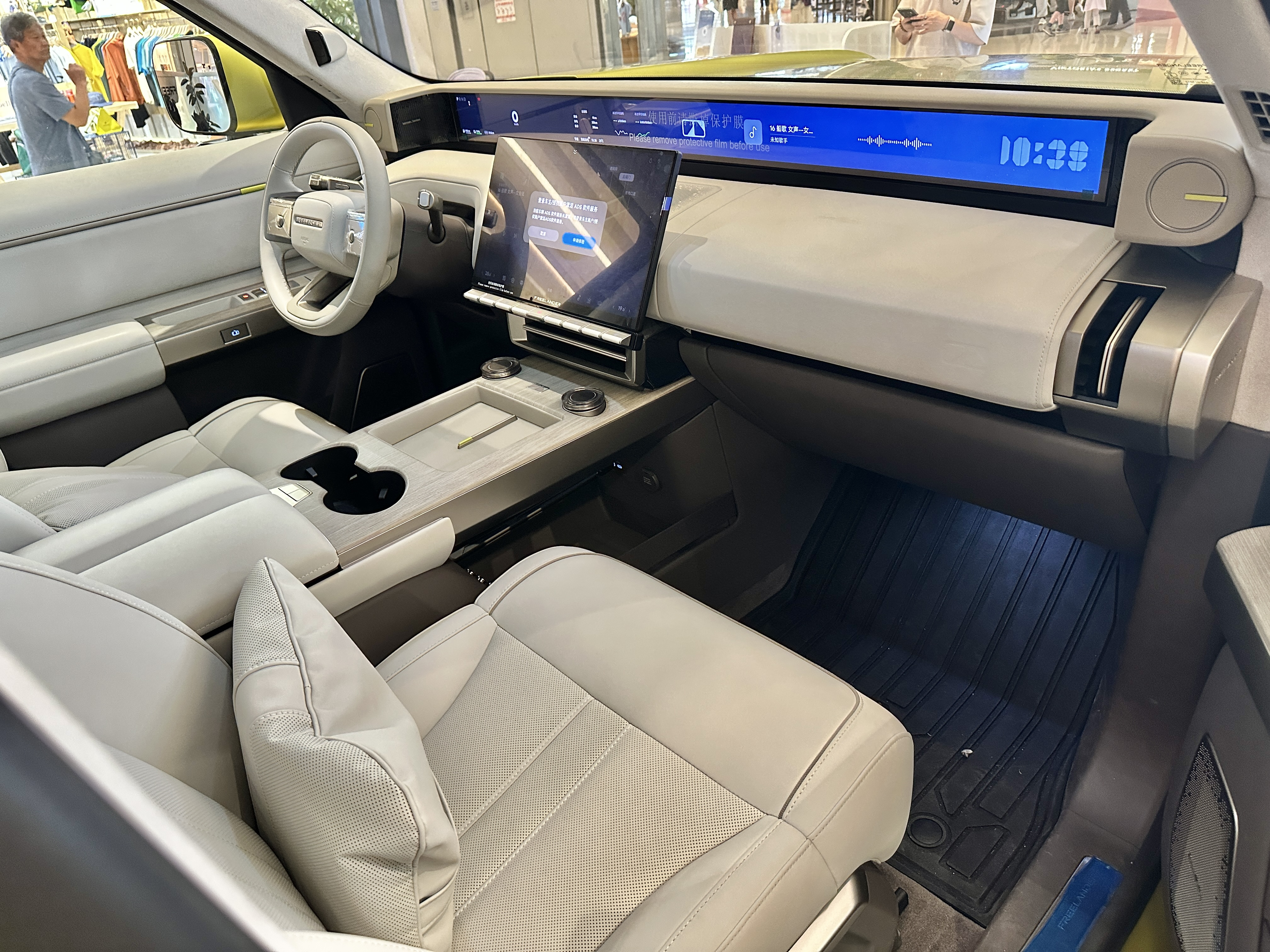
Interior

=== Design ===
The exterior design of the Freelander 8 is largely carried over from the Concept 97. It features an inclined D-pillar that was also used for the 3-door version of the original Freelander. That design element, combined with the triangular quarter window, serves as the basis for the Freelander logo design. It also takes inspiration from the structures of the letters F and L. The black trim on the front end and the headlights were influenced by the Freelander's 2003 facelift. Five regular exterior options are available. The First Edition, which is exclusively available at launch, features three exclusive paint options, including a "Flowing Silver" matte paint with a nano-ceramic varnish. It has a drag coefficient of 0.325 C_{d}.

=== Interior ===
The Freelander 8's interior features a cinematic "Human-Machine Interface" (HMI), consisting of a 46.3-inch MiniLED "Panoramic Intelligent Display" and a 15.6-inch MiniLED central infotainment touchscreen. The former has a width of 1.2 m (47 in), an 8K resolution and a peak brightness of 1000 nits. Below the central display, there are a row of physical buttons crafted using a "Clous de Paris" technique, as well as dual K9-grade optical crystal dials with 144 facets each. It is also equipped with 256-color dual aperture ambient lighting, a 23-speaker Harman Kardon sound system with a 7.1.4-channel layout, dual-layer acoustic glass and active noise cancellation. All vehicle technologies are powered by Qualcomm's Snapdragon 8397 chipset capable of 320 TOPS.

Either a 2-row five seat or 3-row six seat configuration is available. In the case of the latter, the second row consists of two individual zero-gravity seats with a four-way adjustable legrest, heating, ventilation and 16-point massage. Specifically, the second-row seat on the passenger side can recline up to 145 degrees. Meanwhile, the third row is also heated and ventilated, and features a 1.15 metres (45 in) wide sunroof known as the Skylight Corridor. All models offer front seat-back tray tables, a 10-litre (0.35 cu ft) refrigerator operating between −6 °C (21 °F) and 50 °C (122 °F), as well as a ceiling mounted rear entertainment display. Six-seaters have a rear cargo capacity of 1,188 litres (42.0 cu ft) while five-seaters have 2,330 litres (82.3 cu ft).

=== Features ===
The Freelander 8 is available with two versions Huawei's Qiankun ADS 5 ADAS system. It is equipped with the ADS 5 Enhanced system as standard, which features a sensor suite consisting of one Limera solid-state in-cabin LiDAR, 3 mmWave radars, 11 cameras and 12 ultrasonic sensors. It can be upgraded to the ADS 5 Super system, which features the addition of an 896-line roof-mounted LiDAR and a total of 5 mmWave radars. Both systems are capable of Level 2 supervised autonomous driving in highway and urban conditions.

Its architecture utilizes the i-ATS (intelligent All Terrain System) tuned with software assets from Huawei. Traction is regulated through a mechanical differential lock at the front, an electronic rear limited-slip differential and a virtual centre differential lock. It has front double wishbone and rear multilink independent suspension geometries, and is equipped with closed dual-chamber air suspension for a maximum ground clearance of 270 mm (10.6 in) and wading depth of 900 mm (35.4 in). It has ±10° of rear-wheel steering, allowing for a turning radius of 5.15 metres (16.9 ft).

== Powertrain ==
The Freelander 8 was launched exclusively as a range-extender electric vehicle. It uses a Chery 1.5-litre turbocharged inline-4 in Miller cycle which outputs 141 hp (105 kW; 143 PS) (154 hp (115 kW; 156 PS) gross power) and 220 N⋅m (162 lb⋅ft) of torque and is not mechanically connected to the wheels; it has a peak thermal efficiency of 45.79%. It is driven by a 483 hp (360 kW; 490 PS) front motor and a 335 hp (250 kW; 340 PS) rear motor, which has a 2-speed transmission with the lower gear acting as a low range gear to achieve a maximum wheel torque of 8,000 N⋅m (5,900 lb⋅ft), for a total of 818 hp (610 kW; 829 PS); it can switch between low-gear (4L) and high-gear (4H) at speeds up to 20 km/h (12 mph). It is capable of 0–100 km/h (62 mph) acceleration time of 4.6 seconds and a top speed of 220 km/h (137 mph).

It is powered by a 60.331 kWh NMC Freevoy (Xiaoyao) battery pack supplied by CATL, providing 221 kilometres (137 mi) and 310 kilometres (193 mi) WLTP and CLTC electric range ratings, respectively. It supports a peak charging rate of 6C and 350 kW, charging from 20–80% in 12 minutes with the help of its 800-volt architecture.

Specifications
Battery		Motor		Power			Torque			Electric range	
Type	Weight	Front	Rear	Front	Rear	Total	Front	Rear	Total	WLTP	CLTC
60.331 kWh NMC CATL	372 kg (820 lb)	TZ18XYA0 PMSM	YD60TZ22A0 PMSM	483 hp (360 kW; 490 PS)	335 hp (250 kW; 340 PS)	818 hp (610 kW; 829 PS)	338 N⋅m (249 lb⋅ft)	475 N⋅m (350 lb⋅ft)	813 N⋅m (600 lb⋅ft)	221 km (137 mi)	310 km (193 mi)

== Sales ==
The Freelander 8 received over 10,000 pre-orders within 48 hours of pre-sales opening on 14 August 2026. Within 12 hours of its launch on 3 September 2026, the Freelander 8 received over 5,000 locked-in pre-orders. Since deliveries began on 19 September 2026 to October 31, 1,680 Freelander 8s were delivered in China.
