= Land Rover Discovery Sport =

Compact luxury crossover SUV

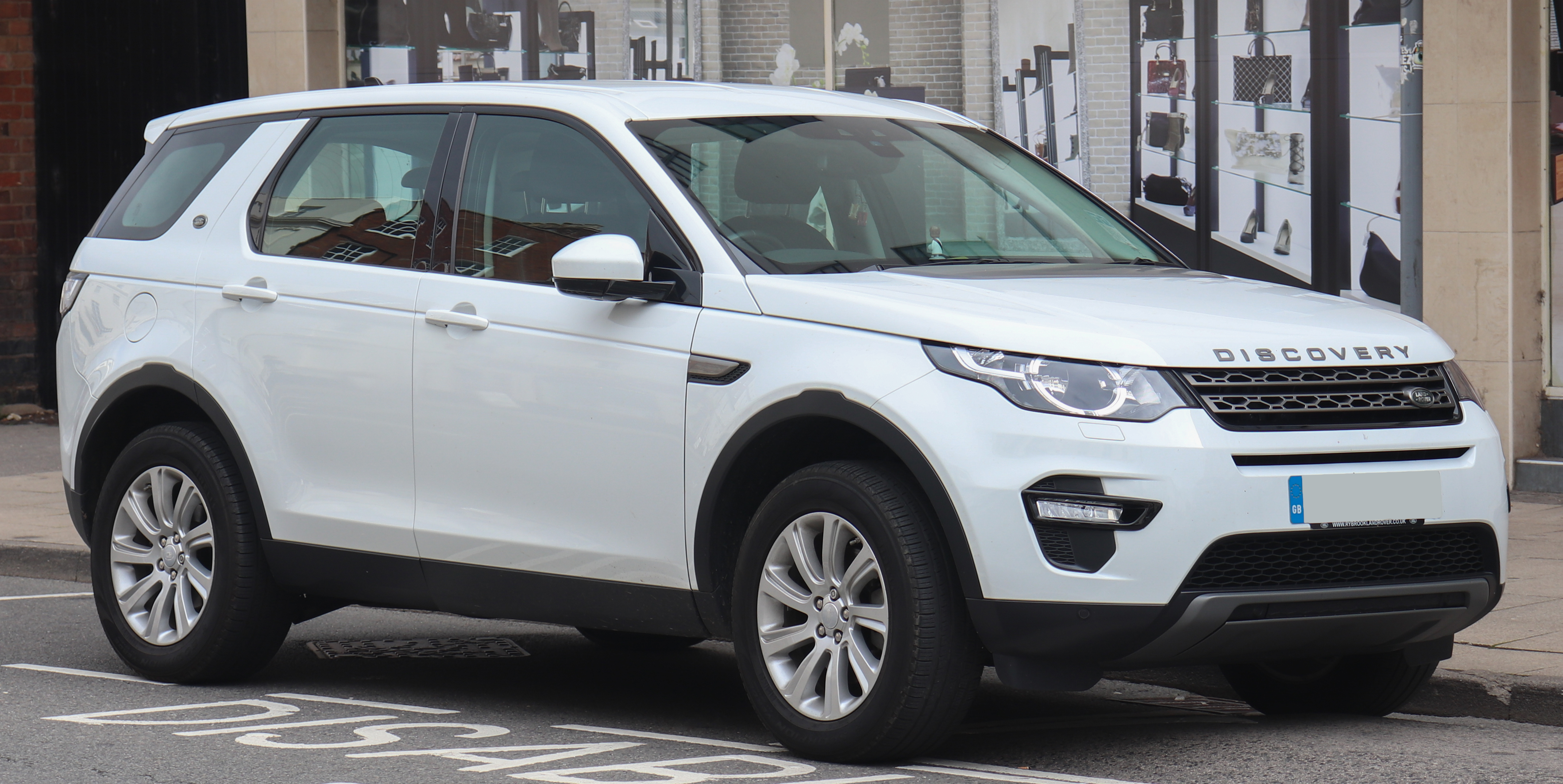

Overview
- Manufacturer: Jaguar Land Rover
- Model code: L550
- Production: 2014–present
- Assembly: United Kingdom: Halewood (Jaguar Land Rover Halewood); China: Changshu (Chery Jaguar Land Rover); Brazil: Itatiaia (Jaguar Land Rover Brazil); India: Pune (Jaguar Land Rover India)
- Designer: Gerry McGovern

Body and chassis
- Class: Compact luxury crossover SUV
- Body style: 5-door SUV
- Layout: Front-engine, front-wheel-drive; Front-engine, all-wheel-drive
- Platform: JLR D8 (2014–2019); Jaguar Land Rover Premium Transverse Architecture (2019–present)
- Related: Range Rover Evoque; Jaguar E-Pace; Tata Harrier; Tata Safari

Powertrain
- Engine: 2015MY; 2.0 L EcoBoost I4 (t/c petrol); 2.2 L Duratorq I4 (t/c diesel); 2016MY; 2.0 L Ingenium I4 (t/c petrol); 2.0 L Ingenium I4 (t/c diesel); Petrol PHEV: 1.5 L Ingenium I3 turbo (P300e)
- Electric motor: 48V mild-hybrid (Synchronous Reluctance Motor); 80 kW Synchronous Reluctance Motor (PHEV)
- Transmission: 6–speed Getrag M66EH50 manual; 8-Speed Aisin automatic (PHEV); 9–speed ZF 9-HP automatic

Dimensions
- Wheelbase: 2,741 mm (107.9 in)
- Length: 4,590 mm (180.7 in) (pre-facelift); 4,597 mm (181.0 in) (facelift)
- Width: 1,895 mm (74.6 in) (pre-facelift); 1,905 mm (75.0 in) (facelift)
- Height: 1,724 mm (67.9 in) (pre-facelift); 1,727 mm (68.0 in) (facelift)
- Kerb weight: 1,744–1,839 kg (3,845–4,054 lb)

Chronology
- Predecessor: Land Rover Freelander

The Land Rover Discovery Sport (internal code L550) is a compact luxury crossover SUV produced by British automotive company Jaguar Land Rover since 2014. Sold under their Land Rover marque, it has been their best-selling model since 2017.

Introduced in late 2014, it replaces the Freelander in a revised Land Rover range of vehicles, with Discovery joining Range Rover as a sub-brand. Contrary to its predecessor, the slightly larger car is also available in a seven seat layout.

The pre-facelift Discovery Sport is based on the JLR D8/LR-MS platform, customised for off-road applications, and is powered by a range of four cylinder petrol and diesel engines. It is the first Discovery built with a unibody structure.

Land Rover described the facelifted Discovery Sport as being based on the JLR PTA platform, a rebrand of the D8. It is also used by the Jaguar E-Pace and L551 version of Range Rover Evoque.

== Overview ==
The Discovery Sport marked the third generation of compact SUV produced by Land Rover and replaced the Freelander. Although the Freelander model range had been a successful way to enable Land Rover to move into the medium SUV market, the company felt that the Freelander brand was tainted with memories of unreliability, and that the Discovery brand was more prestigious.

The future design direction of the Discovery sub-brand was initially previewed in the form of the Land Rover Discovery Vision concept, shown at the 2014 New York International Auto Show, and it was during the show that Gerry McGovern announced the Land Rover Discovery Sport would be the first new model in the enlarged Discovery family. The sub-brand was to be used in the same way as Range Rover, but on leisure and family orientated models, with Range Rover models focusing on the luxury market segment. The new Discovery sub-brand was to feature two models initially, the compact Discovery Sport and the larger Discovery (sold as the LR4 in North America and the Middle East).

=== Exterior ===
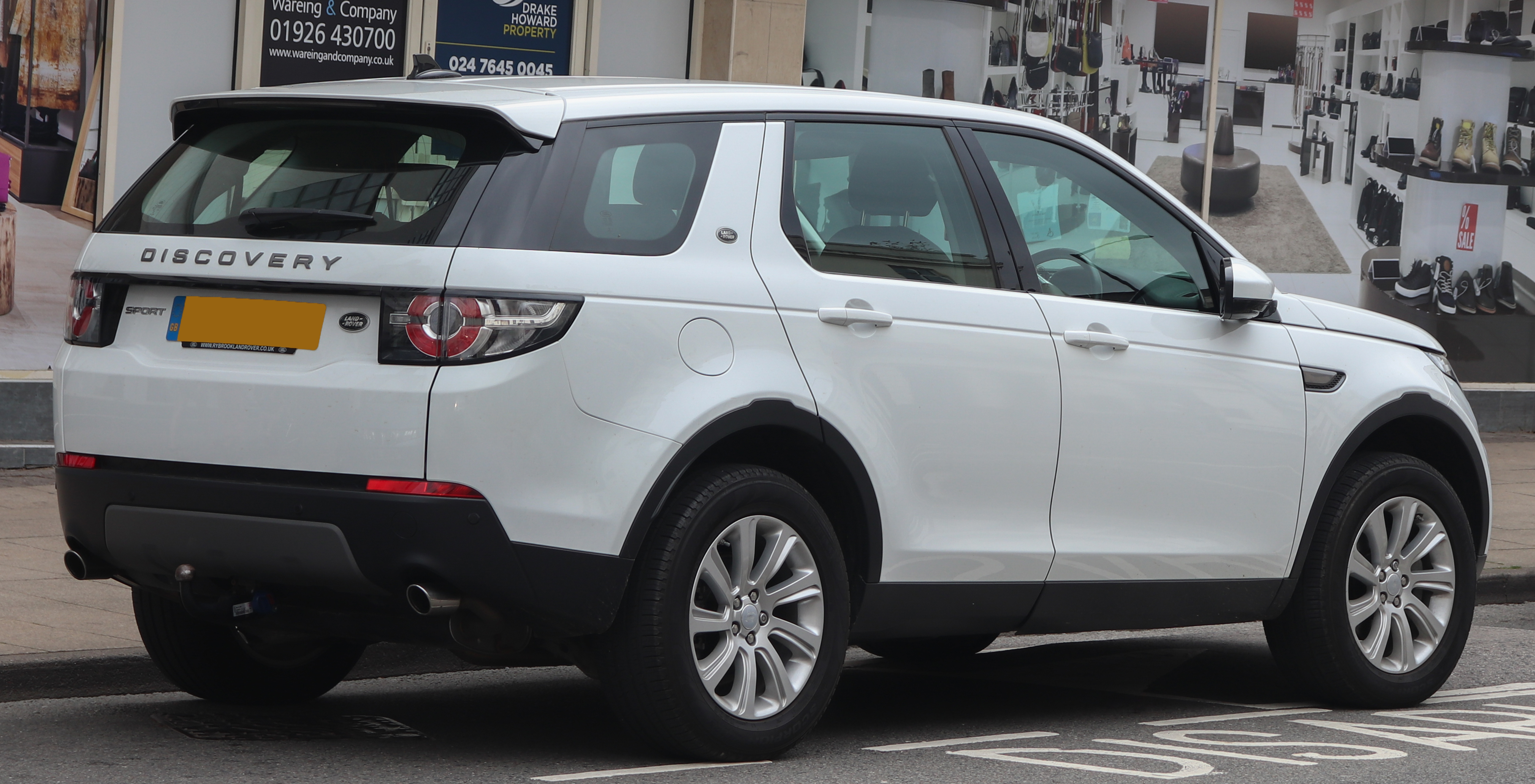
Land Rover Discovery Sport SE Tech (rear)

The Discovery Sport was styled by Gerry McGovern, who was responsible for the design of the original Freelander model. The Discovery Sport shares several design cues with the larger Discovery Vision concept, though the concept vehicle is closer in size to the Discovery 4 model. McGovern left Land Rover for Ford in 1999, before returning as Director of Advanced Design in 2004. He was promoted to Design Director when Geoff Upex retired in 2006, and has been responsible for design of all three current Range Rover models. His predecessor, Upex, was responsible for the Freelander 2 design.

The Discovery Sport features a steel monocoque, the bonnet, wings, roof and tailgate are made from aluminium and a panoramic glass sunroof is available either as standard or as an optional extra depending on model variant. A powered tailgate can also be specified as an option, featuring remote control operation.

In certain markets, the bonnet is fitted with an airbag to improve pedestrian survivability in the event of a collision. The airbag is mounted in a panel at the trailing edge of the bonnet panel and protects a pedestrian's head from striking the base of the windscreen.

=== Chassis ===
The Discovery Sport is the first to feature unibody construction — the larger, full size Discovery models were traditional body-on-frame SUVs, until the Discovery 5 followed suit in 2017. The platform used for the Discovery Sport is the Land Rover LR-MS platform, shared with the Range Rover Evoque and derived from the Ford EUCD platform, but with 90% of components redesigned from scratch to meet Land Rover's specific demands, primarily related to off-road use.

The Discovery Sport includes further changes to the platform in comparison with the Evoque, with a new compact rear multi-link suspension design to permit the folding rear seats and spare wheel well in the boot space, without requiring an unduly high and impractical load floor. The front suspension is a MacPherson strut design carried over from the Range Rover Evoque largely unchanged, and features steel lower and aluminium upper control arms.

Off-road performance remains broadly similar to the Freelander 2 model, ground clearance is 212 mm (8.3 in), the same as the Freelander 2, and wading depth is 600 mm (24 in), an improvement of 100 mm (4 in). The approach angle for the Discovery Sport is 25° and the ramp angle is 21°, reductions of 6° and 2° respectively, when compared to the Freelander 2. The departure angle remains unchanged at 31°. The Discovery Sport features removable components on the lower sections of the front bumper which improves the approach angle.

The braking system comprises disc brakes all round, with 325 mm (12.8 in) discs at the front and 300 mm (12 in) at the rear, the brakes are servo assisted and an anti-lock braking system (ABS) is fitted. The braking system also features an emergency brake force assistance system to reduce stopping distances in an emergency, stability aides, and an autonomous emergency braking system. The Discovery Sport, when tested by Euro NCAP in December 2014, was awarded a five star safety rating, and based on its score, was ranked as the safest vehicle in its class, the Small Off-Road class.

Electric power steering is fitted, with 2.43 turns lock to lock and a turning circle of 11.86 metres (38.9 ft). The electric power steering system allows the Discovery Sport to feature an automatic parking system.

The Discovery Sport was to be initially be sold with alloy wheels ranging from 18 in (460 mm) to 20 in (510 mm) in diameter. Various emergency spare wheels options are available depending on vehicle configuration: a full-size spare wheel mounted internally under the floor of the load area, or if the 5+2 seating option is fitted it a 'space-saver' spare wheel mounted on the underside of the car was to be used. It was not possible to have a factory-fitted tow bar with a spare wheel on 5+2 seat vehicles as they mount in the same place under the vehicle, so a tyre repair system of sealant and a compressor was supplied instead.

=== Engines ===
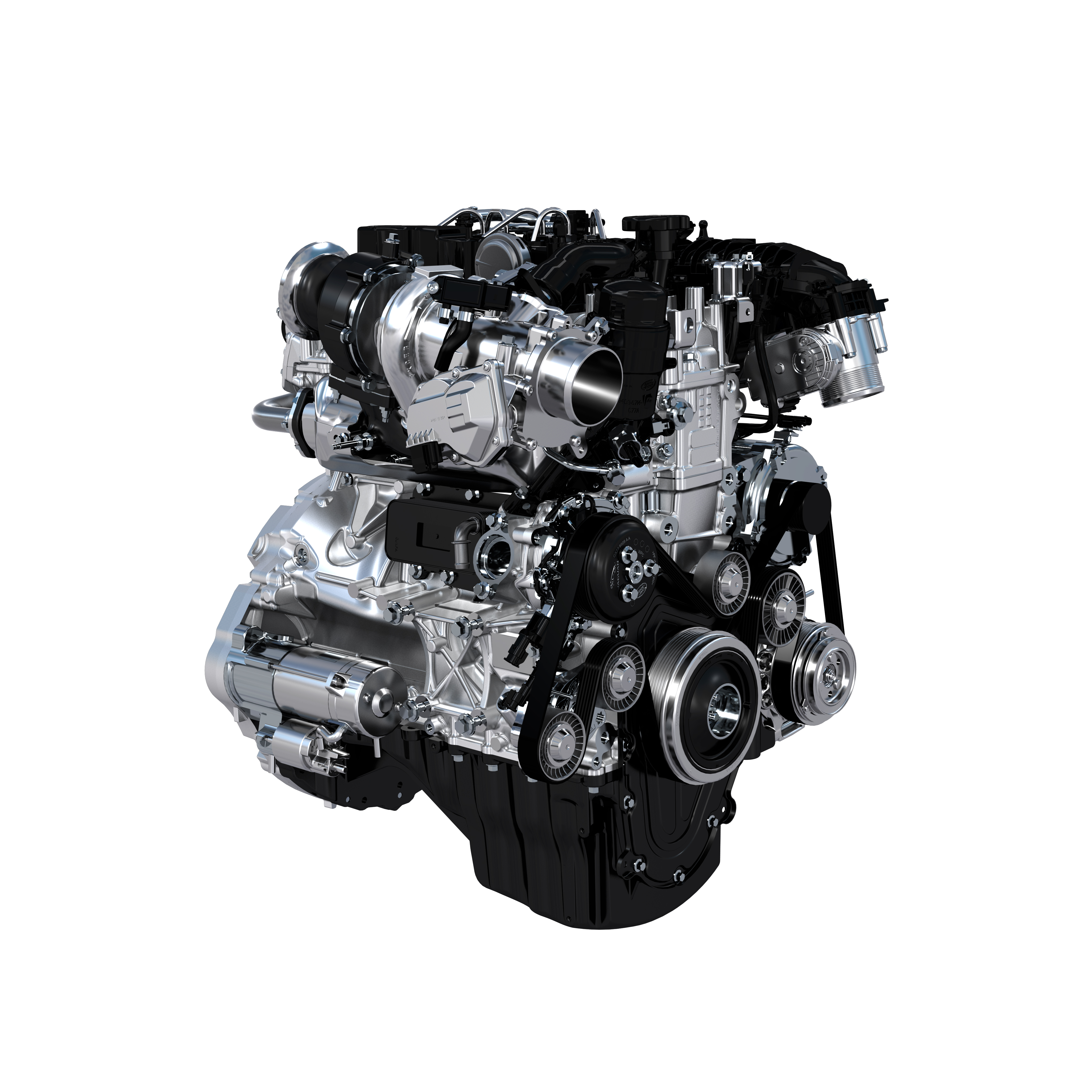
Jaguar Land Rover Ingenium engine

The Discovery Sport was initially powered by the same engine range that features in the outgoing Freelander 2 model for the first model year, the Ford EcoBoost four cylinder 2.0-litre turbocharged petrol engine producing 240 PS (177 kW; 237 hp) (the only engine option for North America) and the Ford Duratorq four cylinder 2.2-litre turbocharged diesel engine, producing either 150 PS (110 kW; 148 hp) or 190 PS (140 kW; 187 hp).

The engines sourced from Ford were replaced by engines from Jaguar Land Rover's new Ingenium engine family from late 2015. The Ingenium family is a range of modular four cylinder turbocharged engines of 2.0-litre capacity, built around individual 500cc cylinders. The family is produced in both petrol and diesel variants, and could also be produced in 3, 4 and 6 cylinder options in future, depending on demand and requirements. The range was designed from the outset to accommodate different hybrid power systems, and it was expected that there would be a plug-in hybrid variant.

The Ingenium engine range can be configured to deliver different power outputs, and the most fuel efficient Discovery Sport eD4 model is powered by a 150 PS (110 kW; 148 hp) 2.0-litre four cylinder turbocharged diesel engine in a front wheel drive only configuration. This model is planned to have CO_{2} emissions of 119 g/km (6.8 oz/mi) and fuel economy of up to 24.2 km/L (4.13 L/100 km; 68 mpg_{‑imp}; 57 mpg_{‑US}).

The engines in the Discovery Sport are mounted transversely, which creates additional interior space.

=== Transmission ===
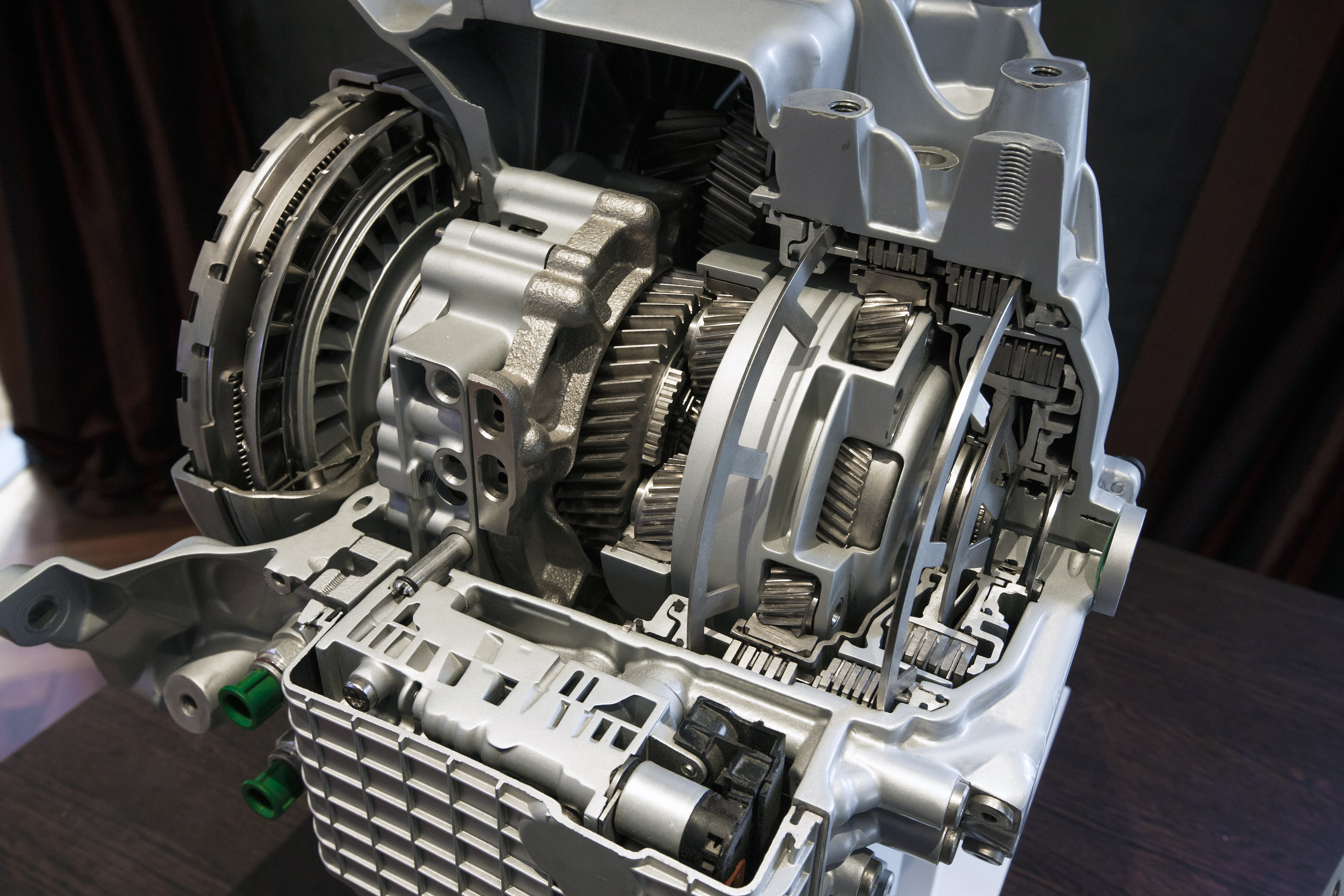
ZF 9-HP48 sectioned gearbox

The Discovery Sport is manufactured with either a 9–speed ZF 9-HP automatic gearbox or a 6–speed Getrag M66EH50 manual gearbox, both of which are also available on the Range Rover Evoque.

Two different all-wheel drive systems are available. The standard system is the Haldex Traction fifth generation system. Optional is the new Land Rover Active Driveline system, which is manufactured by GKN Driveline and which has a 75% smaller parasitic load when compared to the Haldex system. This delivers increased fuel economy and reduced CO_{2} emissions. The Active Driveline system works by disconnecting all of the major all wheel drive components from the gearbox, rather than at the central coupling. The system also features torque vectoring to direct power to individual wheels.

Neither system has a low range transfer box, although the ZF 9-HP features a special very low ratio first gear which is used only when the vehicle is off-road or otherwise needed. For on-road use, the vehicle will normally start in second gear.

The Discovery Sport was also to be available in a two-wheel drive version, in which only the front wheels are driven. The Terrain Response System, which configures the vehicle for off-road use, is deleted. This version was to be the most fuel efficient and least polluting model in the range, and together with the more fuel efficient Jaguar XE models, was to assist Jaguar Land Rover in meeting European Union emissions directives.

=== Interior ===
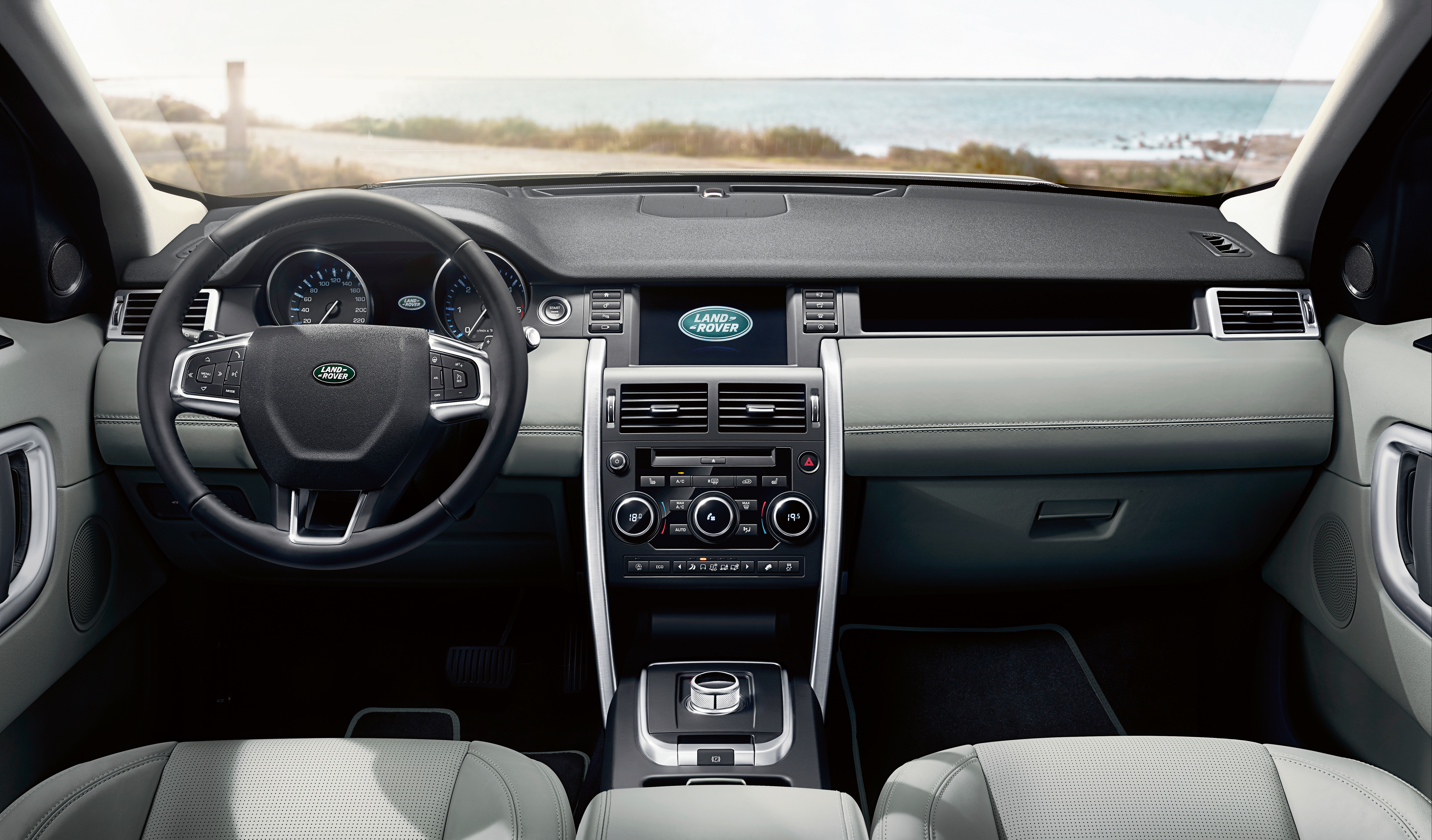
Interior

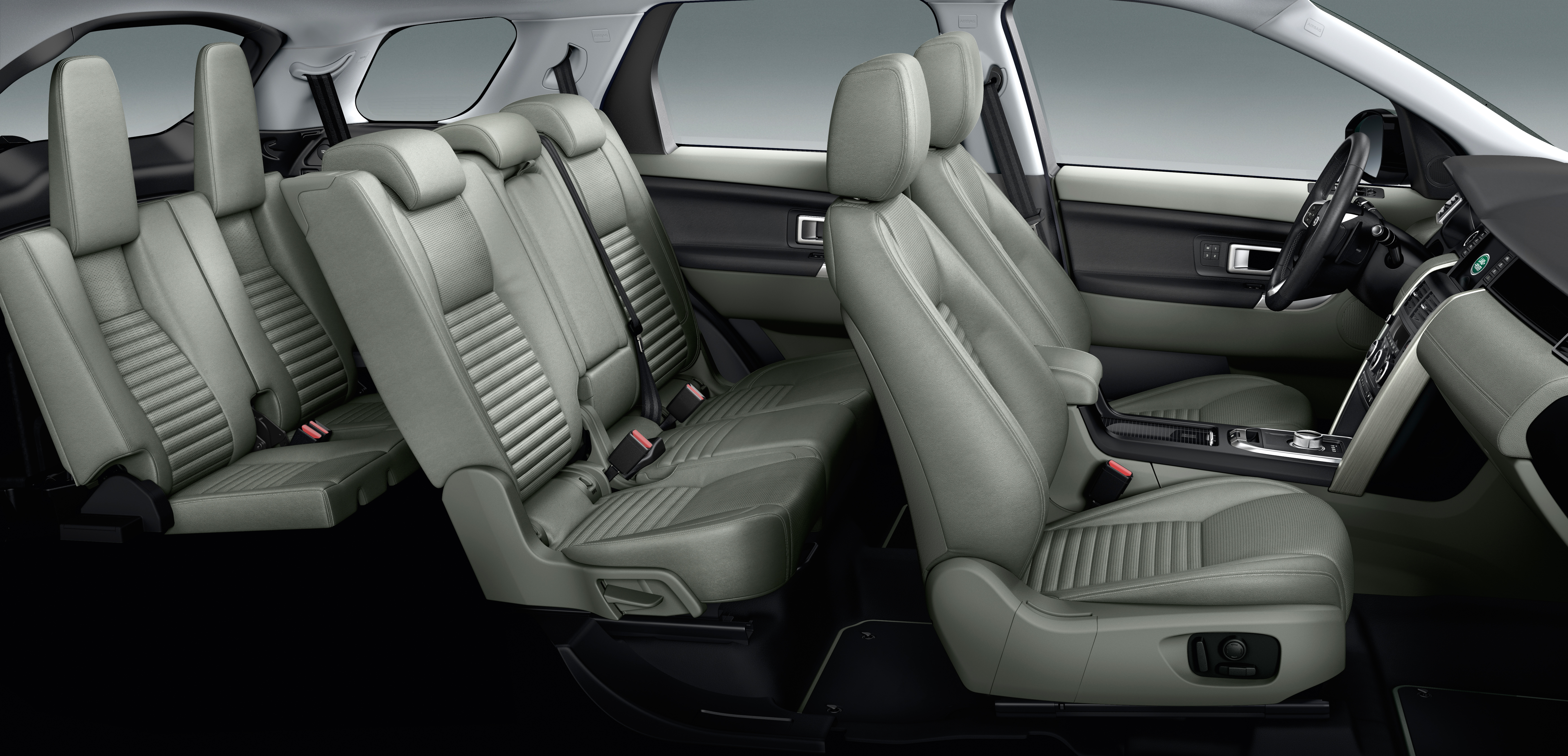
Discovery Sport showing seven seats

The interior of the Discovery Sport is available in a seven-seat (referred to as five plus two) configuration, with the front row featuring two seats and three seats on the second row. The second row seats slide and recline, and fold in a 60:40 configuration, folding forward to allow access to a third row of two seats where fitted. The third row of seats are not intended for full-time usage, and are described by Land Rover as being suitable for children up to the age of 15 and occasional adult use. They fold flat into the floor of the trunk when not in use. Isofix mounting points for child safety seats are fitted as standard.

The central console features an 8 in (20 cm) touch screen allowing access to in car entertainment, satellite navigation and vehicle settings. The system, shared with the Jaguar XE, allows smartphone connectivity and some models allow the owner to control the vehicle remotely, pre-heating the interior or unlocking the car using a smartphone application.

=== Production ===
The Discovery Sport is manufactured at the Jaguar Land Rover Halewood assembly facility, in Halewood, Liverpool, United Kingdom, alongside the Range Rover Evoque.

Early model engines were supplied by Ford manufactured at two sites - the Duratorq diesel engine at the Ford Dagenham plant in the United Kingdom and the Ecoboost petrol engine at the Ford Valencia Plant in Spain. The Jaguar Land Rover Ingenium engines, which have replaced the Ford sourced engines in late 2015, are manufactured at Jaguar Land Rover's Engine Manufacturing Centre in Wolverhampton, United Kingdom.

Transmissions for the Discovery Sport are manufactured by ZF at their Gray Court, South Carolina facility, and by Getrag Ford Transmissions at their Cologne, Germany plant. Four wheel drive components are manufactured by Haldex in Landskrona, Sweden or by GKN in Köping, Sweden and Birmingham, United Kingdom.

== Facelift ==
The 2019 Discovery Sport facelift was revealed on 21 May 2019, and is based on the Jaguar Land Rover Premium Transverse Architecture (PTA) platform shared with the Jaguar E-Pace and the second generation of Range Rover Evoque. The platform switch allows the facelifted model to use engines equipped with 48-volt mild hybrid system and PHEV engines.

The exterior received updated front and rear bumpers with a widened track, new front and rear LED lighting, updated grille design, new lower side mouldings and new alloy wheel designs with the option of 21-inch wheels for the first time. The interior received a new Luxtex upholstery made from recycled polyester microfibre, the Touch Pro infotainment system with a 10.25-inch touchscreen compatible with Apple CarPlay and Android Auto, and a few new features such as a smart rear view mirror.

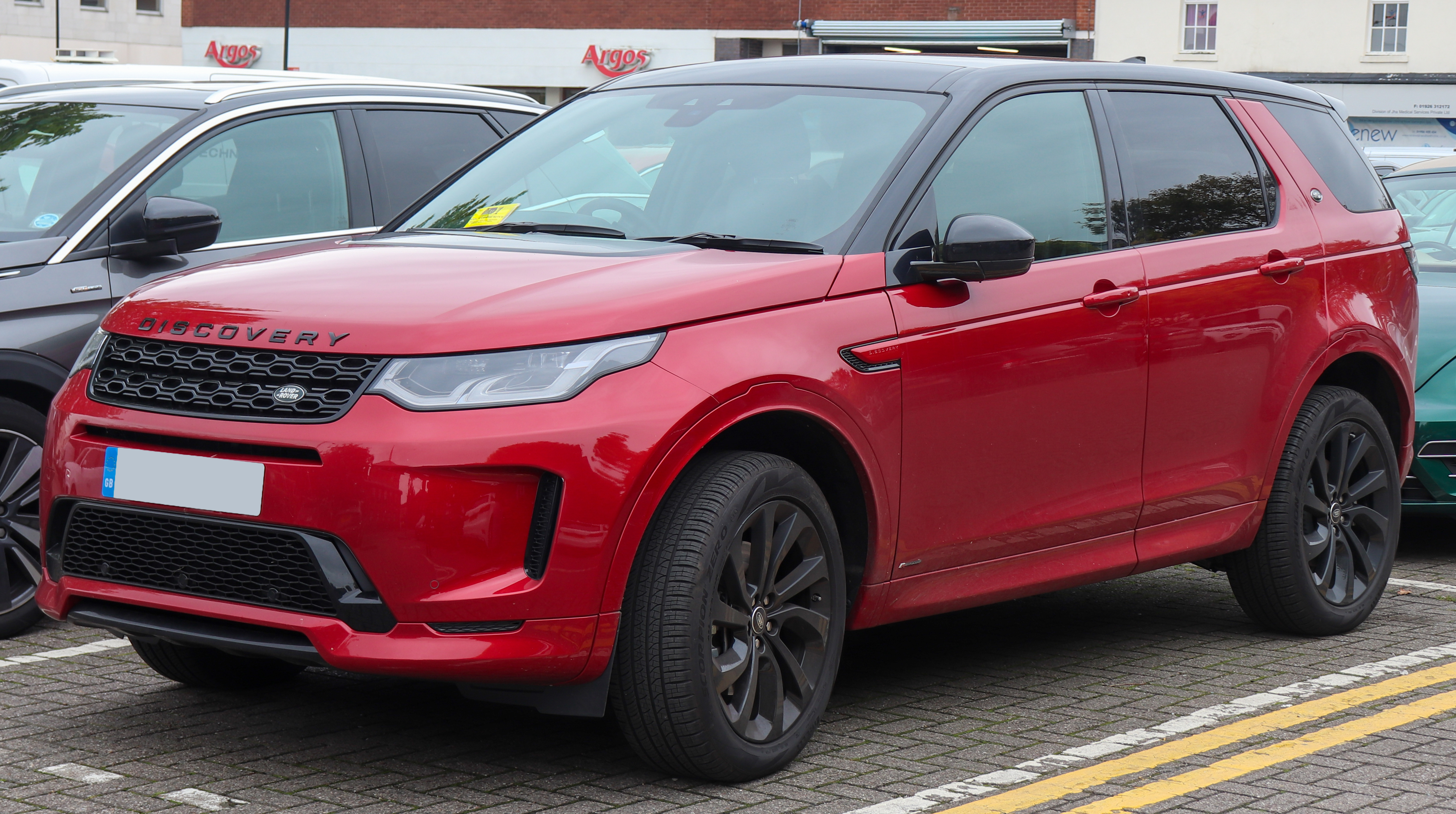
Front view

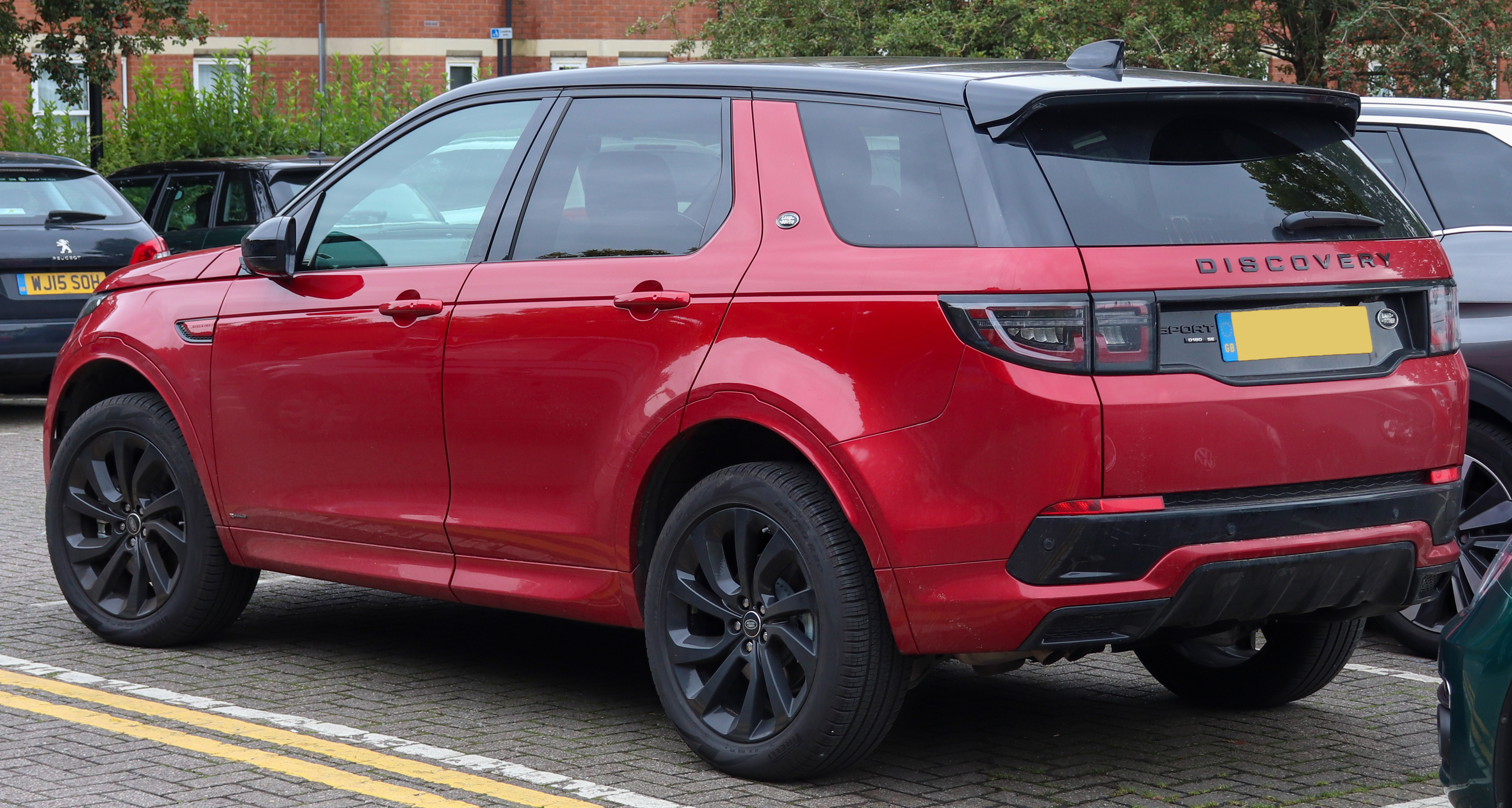
Rear view

== Safety ==
ANCAP test results* Land Rover Discovery Sport all variants (2014, aligned with Euro NCAP)
Test	Points	%
Overall:	5 /5 stars	
Adult occupant:	35.5	93%
Child occupant:	40.9	83%
Pedestrian:	25.1	69%
Safety assist:	10.7	82%

ANCAP test results Land Rover Discovery Sport all variants excluding PHEV (2022, aligned with Euro NCAP)
Test	Points	%
Overall:	5 /5 stars	
Adult occupant:	32.31	85%
Child occupant:	43.22	88%
Pedestrian:	38.66	71%
Safety assist:	13.31	83%

Euro NCAP test results* Land Rover Discovery Sport 2.2 diesel SE (RHD) (2014)
Test	Points	%
Overall:	5 /5 stars	
Adult occupant:	35.6	93%
Child occupant:	41	83%
Pedestrian:	25.1	69%
Safety assist:	10.8	82%

Euro NCAP test results Land Rover Discovery Sport (2022)
Test	Points	%
Overall:	5 /5 stars	
Adult occupant:	32.2	84%
Child occupant:	43.7	89%
Pedestrian:	38.7	71%
Safety assist:	13.7	85%

== Worldwide sales ==
Year	Sales
2014	83
2015	69,501
2016	122,460
2017	126,078
2018	95,520
Total	413,642
