= Jaguar E-Pace =

Jaguar E-Pace (X540)
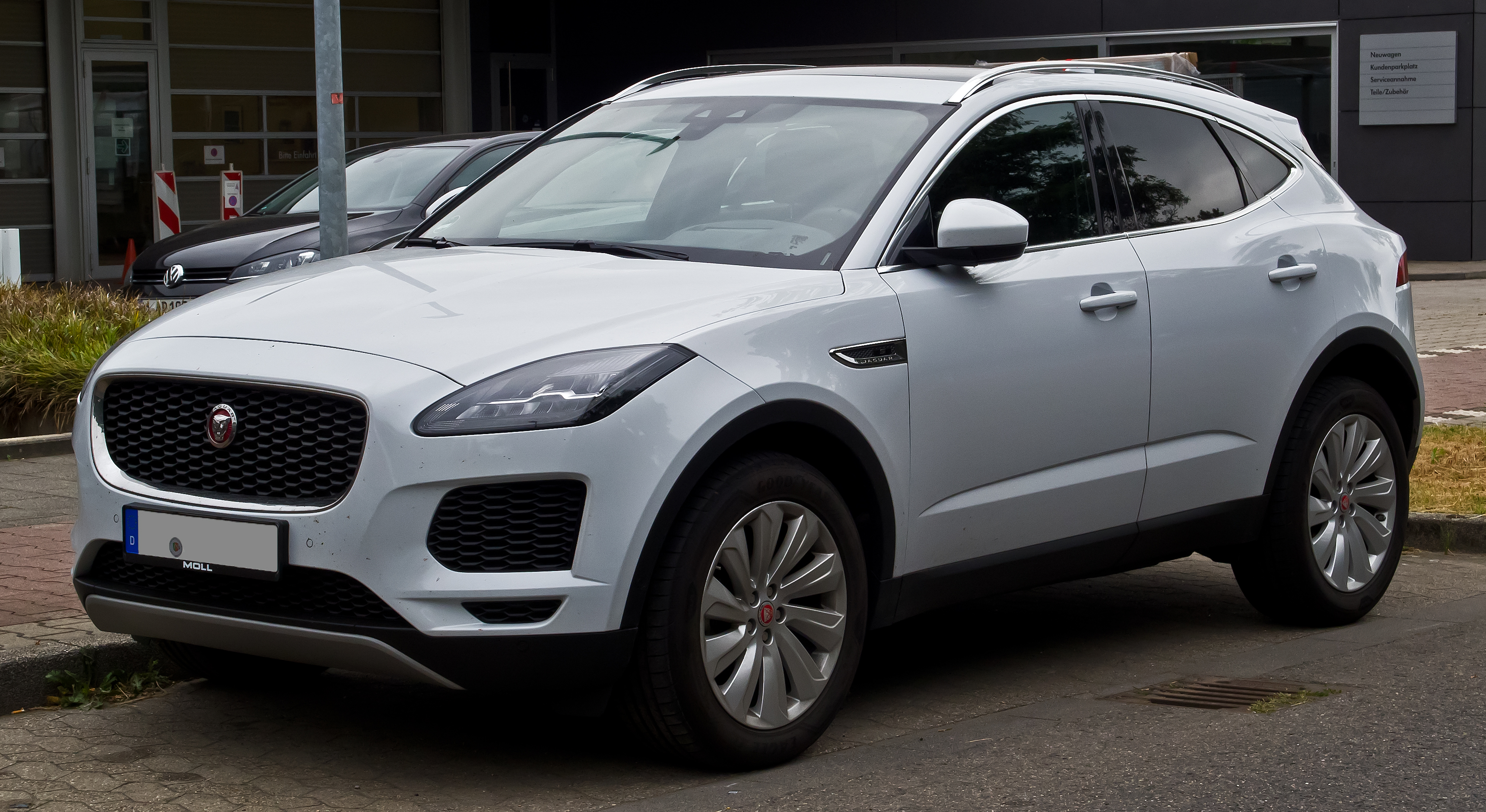
- E-Pace (D180 AWD trim, Germany)

Overview
- Manufacturer: Jaguar Land Rover
- Model code: X540
- Production: 2017–2024
- Assembly: Austria: Graz (Magna Steyr); China: Changshu (Chery Jaguar Land Rover)
- Designer: Ian Callum

Body and chassis
- Class: Subcompact luxury crossover SUV (C)
- Body style: 5-door SUV
- Layout: Front-engine, front-wheel-drive; Front-engine, all-wheel-drive
- Platform: JLR PTA
- Related: Range Rover Evoque (L551); Land Rover Discovery Sport; Tata Harrier

Powertrain
- Engine: Petrol: 1.5 L Ingenium AJ150 I3 (P160); 2.0 L Ingenium AJ200 I4; Diesel: 2.0 L Ingenium AJ200D I4 (D165 & D200); Hybrid: 1.5 L Ingenium AJ150 I3 (P300e)
- Electric motor: 48V mild-hybrid (Synchronous Reluctance Motor); 80 kW Synchronous Reluctance Motor (PHEV)
- Transmission: 8-speed Aisin AWF8F35 automatic (P160 & P300e); 9-speed ZF 9HP automatic
- Hybrid drivetrain: MHEV (P160/D165/D200); PHEV (P300e)
- Battery: 15 kWh Lithium ion (PHEV)

Dimensions
- Wheelbase: 2,681 mm (105.6 in)
- Length: 4,395 mm (173.0 in)
- Width: 1,984 mm (78.1 in)
- Height: 1,648 mm (64.9 in)

The Jaguar E-Pace (X540) is a subcompact luxury crossover SUV (C-segment in Europe) that was produced by the British car manufacturer Jaguar Land Rover (JLR) under their Jaguar marque. It was officially revealed on 13 July 2017 and was the second production Jaguar SUV.

The car was built in Graz, Austria, by Magna Steyr and from 2018 by Chery Jaguar Land Rover, JLR's joint venture with partner Chery, in Changshu, China.

== Overview ==
Designed under the direction of Jaguar chief designer Ian Callum, the vehicle uses the JLR PTA platform, as used by the second incarnation of Range Rover Evoque and the second incarnation of Land Rover Discovery Sport.

The car has a transverse front engine and is available in both front-wheel drive and all-wheel drive versions.

Stunt driver Terry Grant performed a world record barrel roll jump in the car for the reveal which took place at the London ExCel centre. The car did a 270 degree barrel roll and travelled 50 feet (15.3 metres) through the air.

Production of the E-Pace ended in 2024, aligning with Jaguar's new goal of only offering fully electric vehicles going forward.

== Engines ==
North American models receive two variants of the 2.0 L Ingenium engine that produces either 247 hp (184 kW; 250 PS) or 296 hp (221 kW; 300 PS), all of which are mated to a 9–speed ZF 9-HP automatic.

In 2021, a facelift of the E-Pace included the addition of mild hybrid and plug in hybrid variants.

== Gallery ==
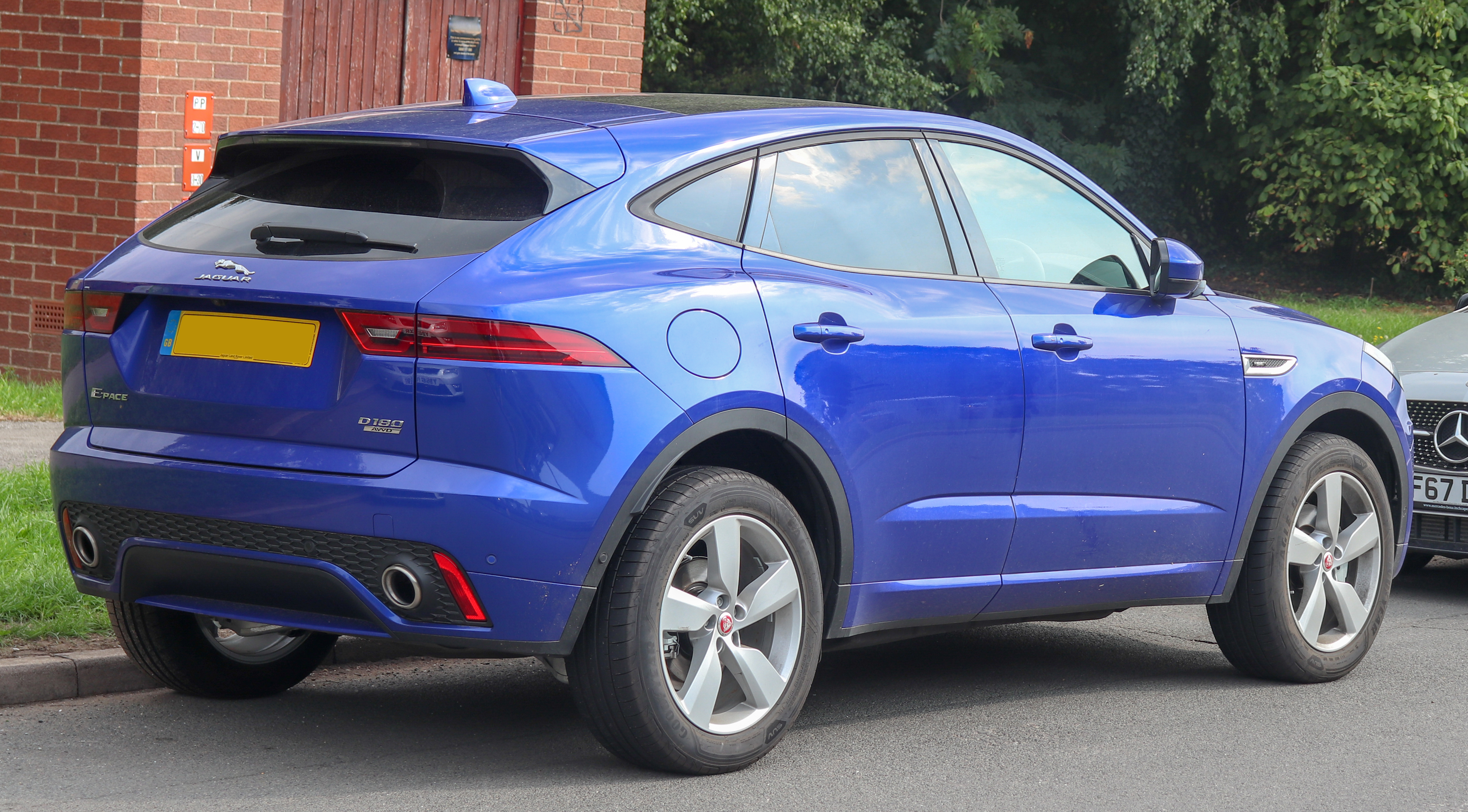
E-Pace R-Dynamic Rear

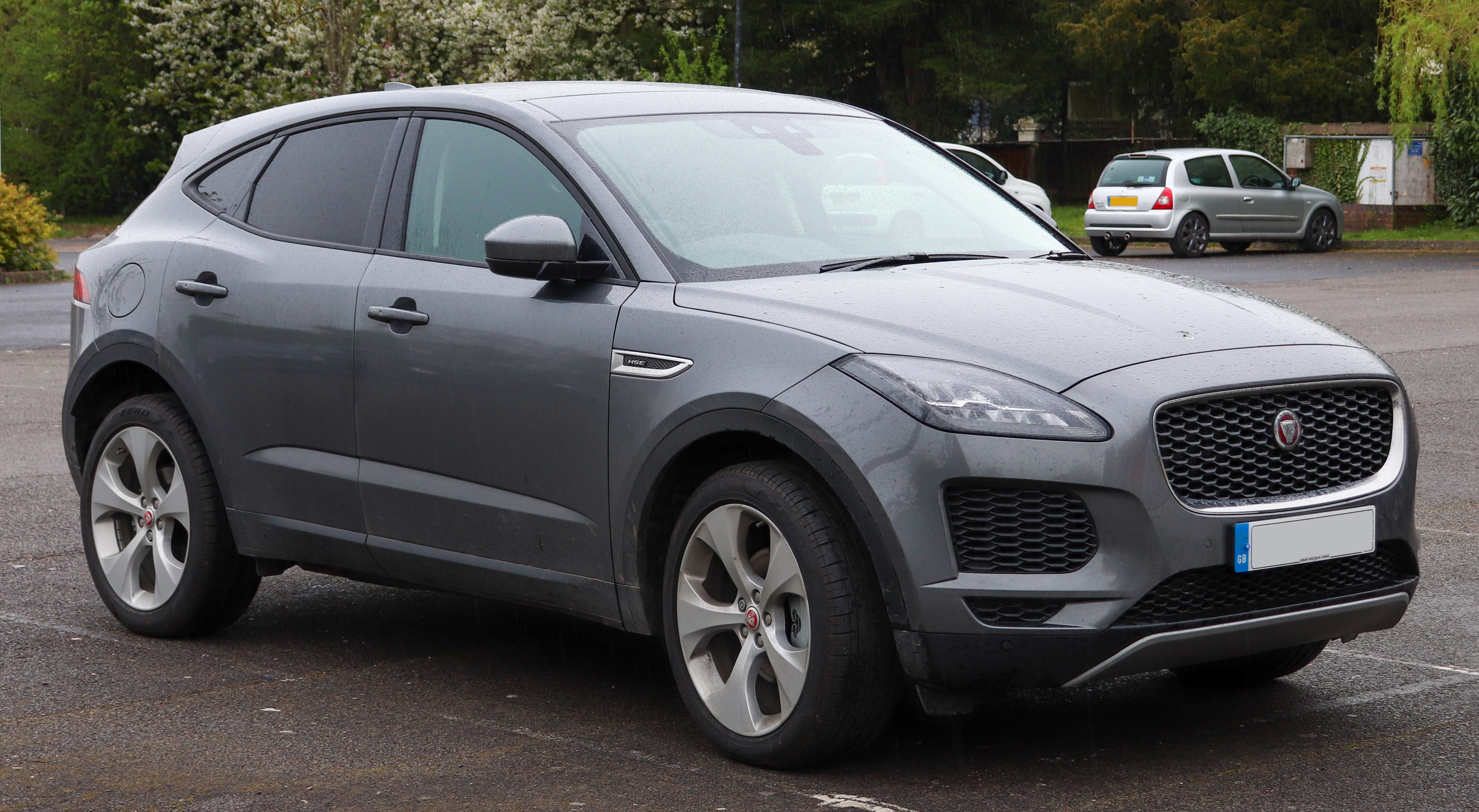
Jaguar E-Pace HSE
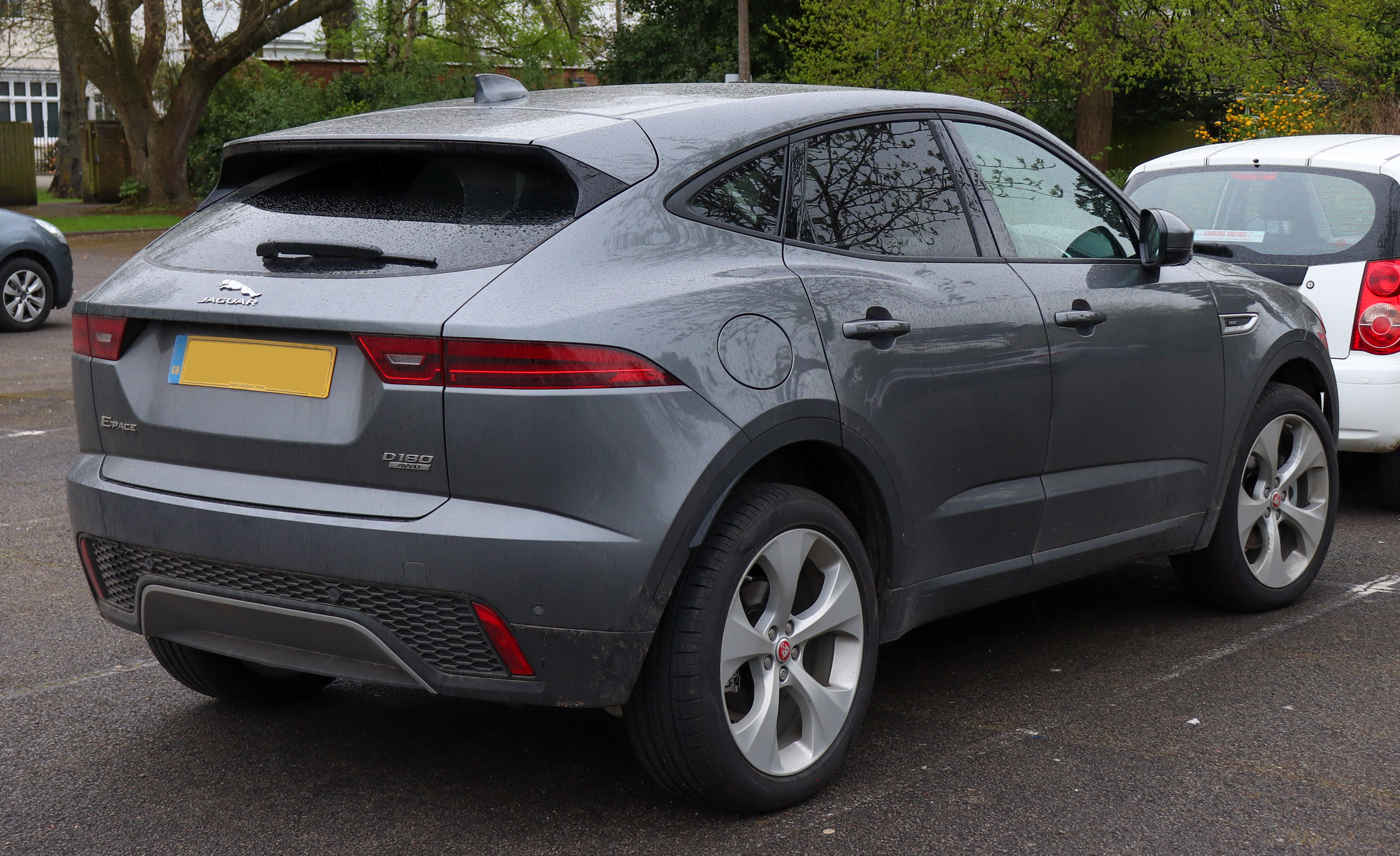
Jaguar E-Pace HSE

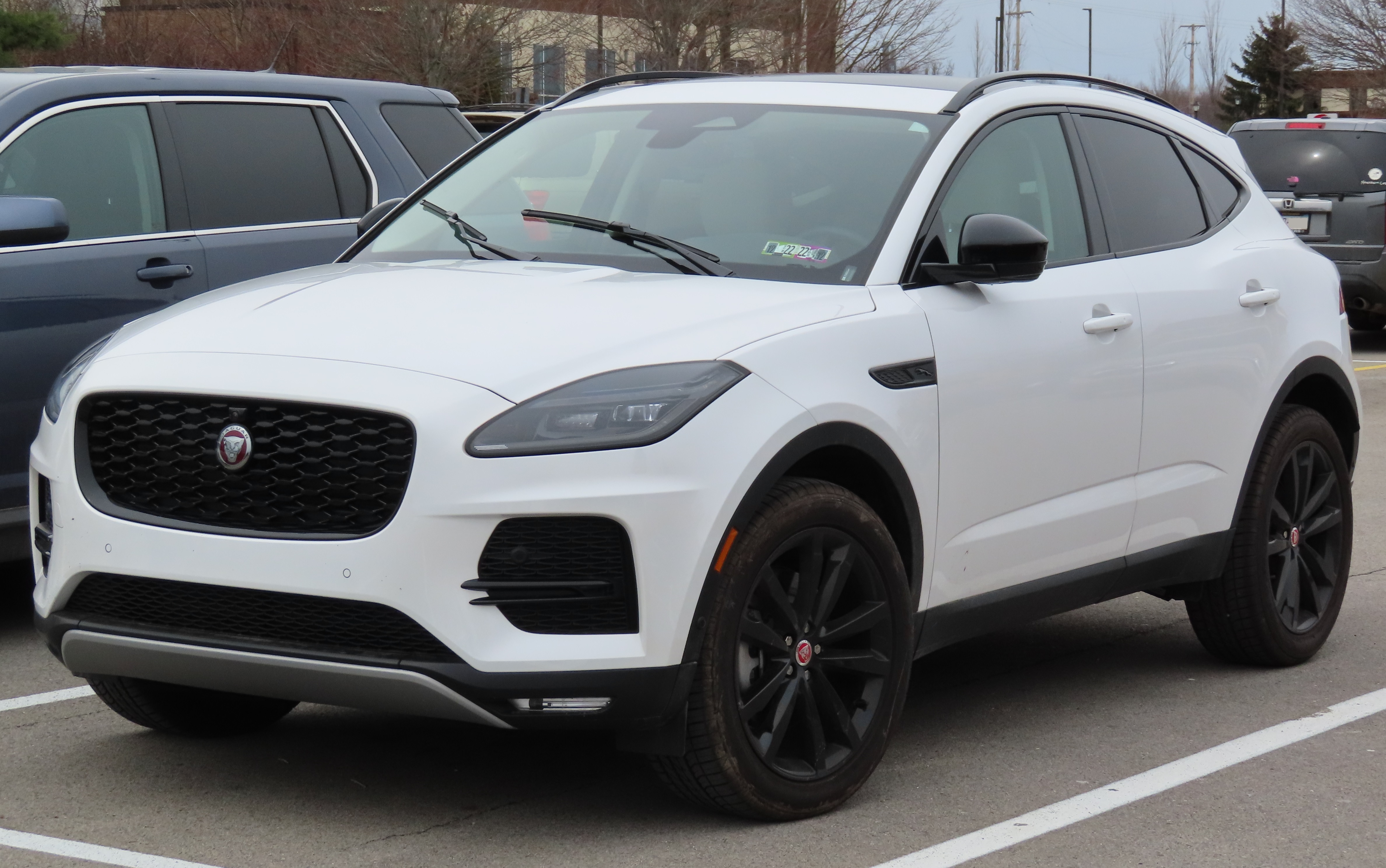
Jaguar E-Pace P250 SE (Facelift, North America)

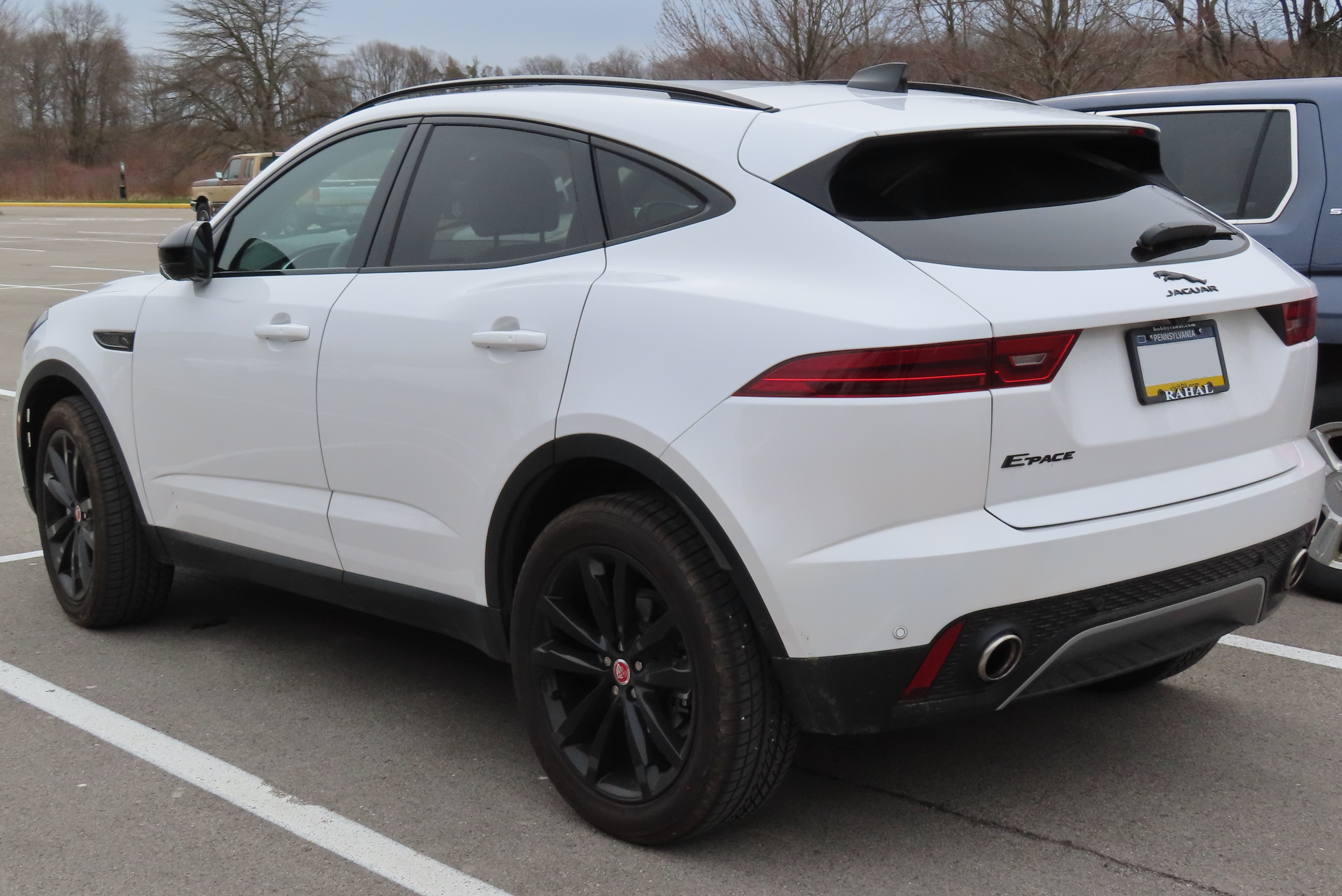
Jaguar E-Pace P250 SE (Facelift, North America, Rear view)

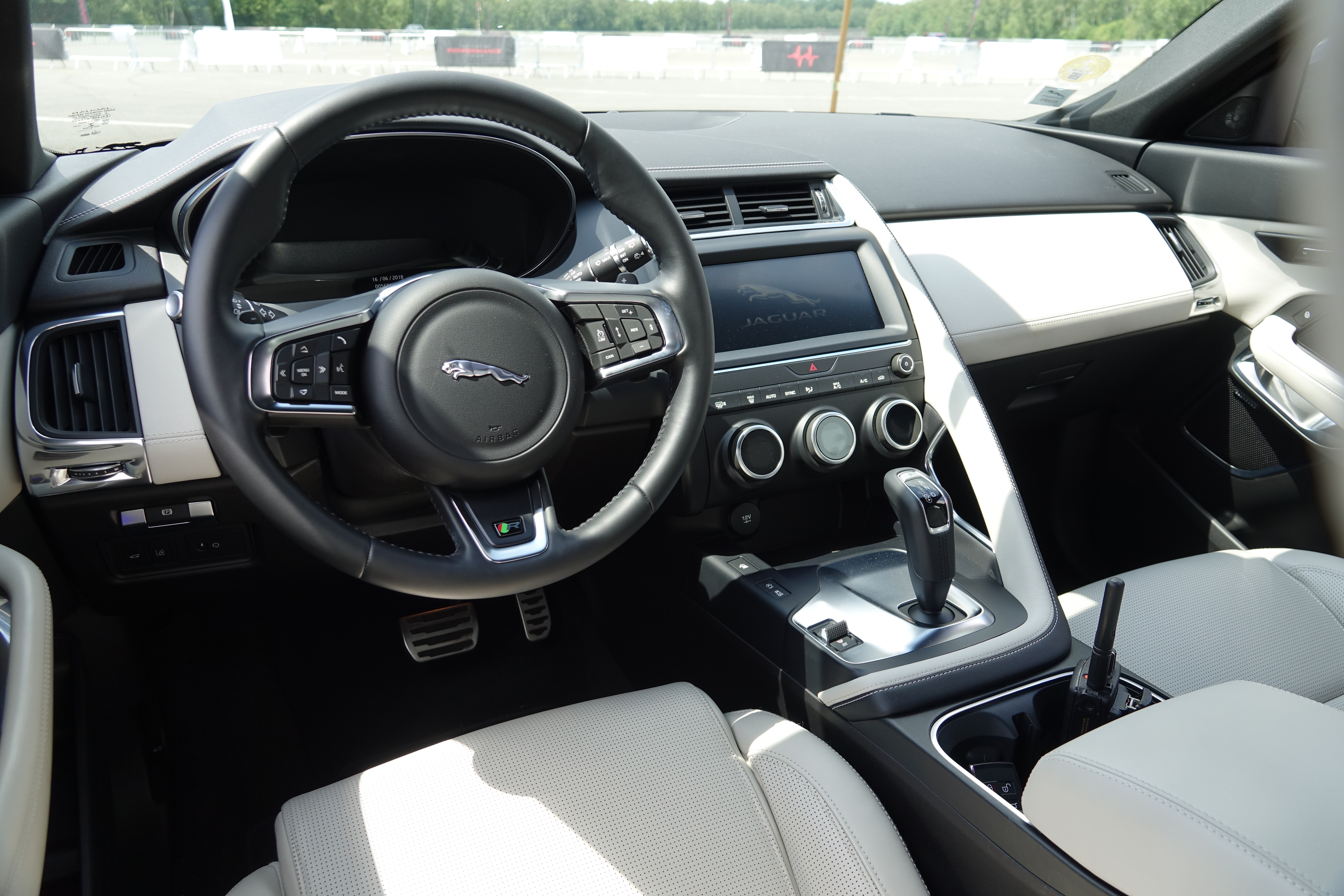
Interior

== Facelift; 2021 ==
The facelifted version of the X540 was unveiled in 2021.

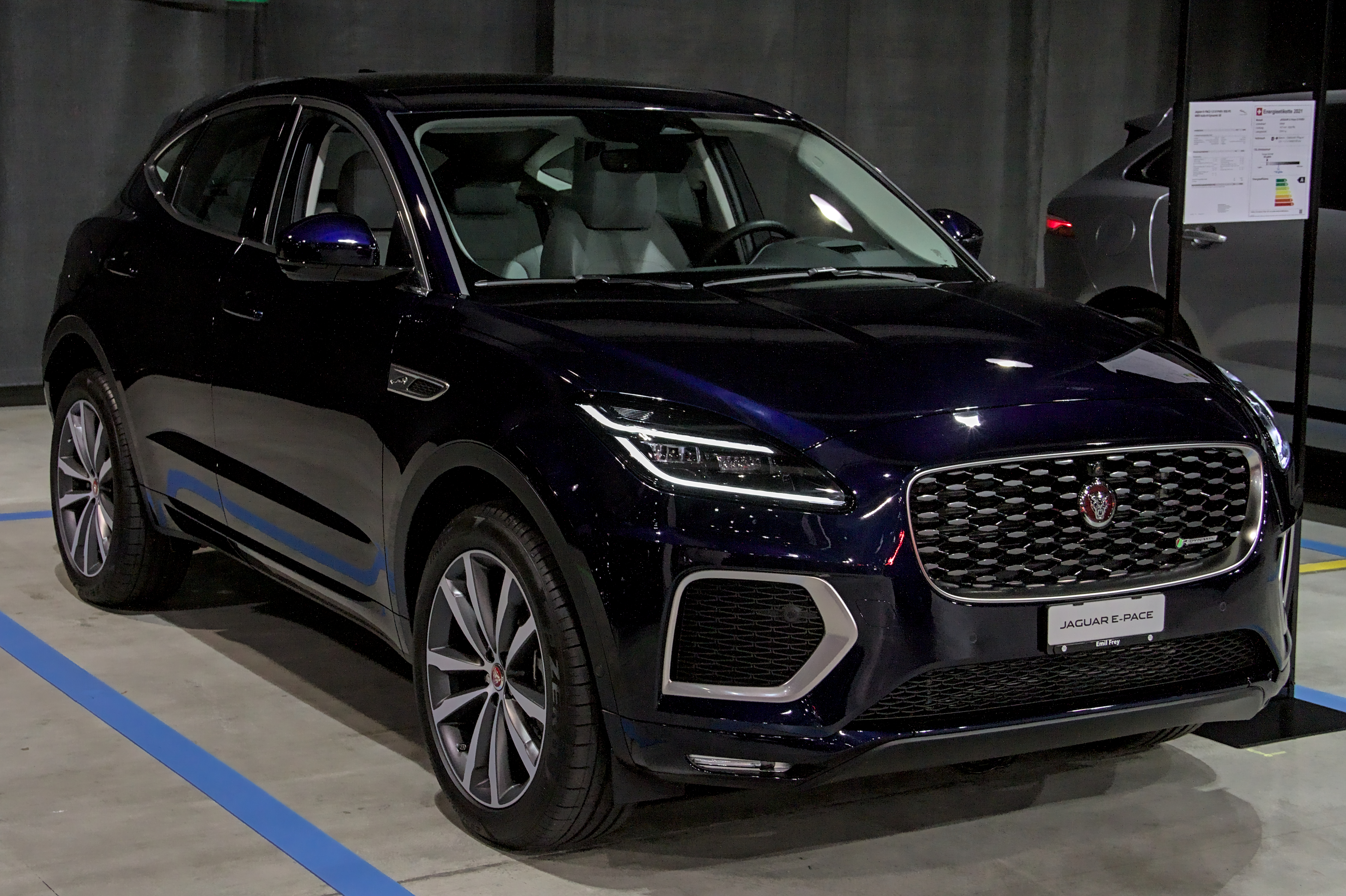
Front view

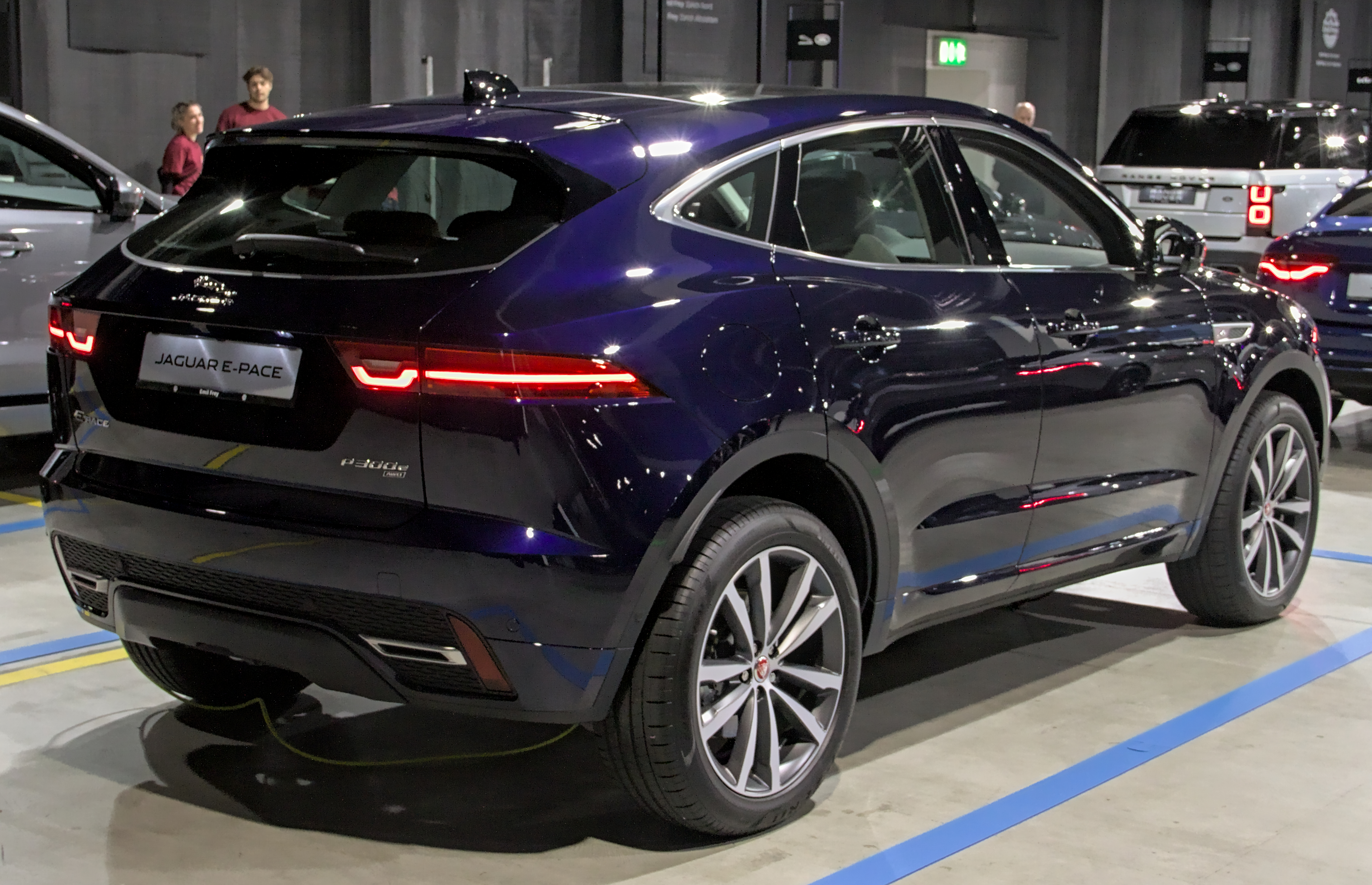
Rear view

== Markets ==
=== Africa ===
==== South Africa ====
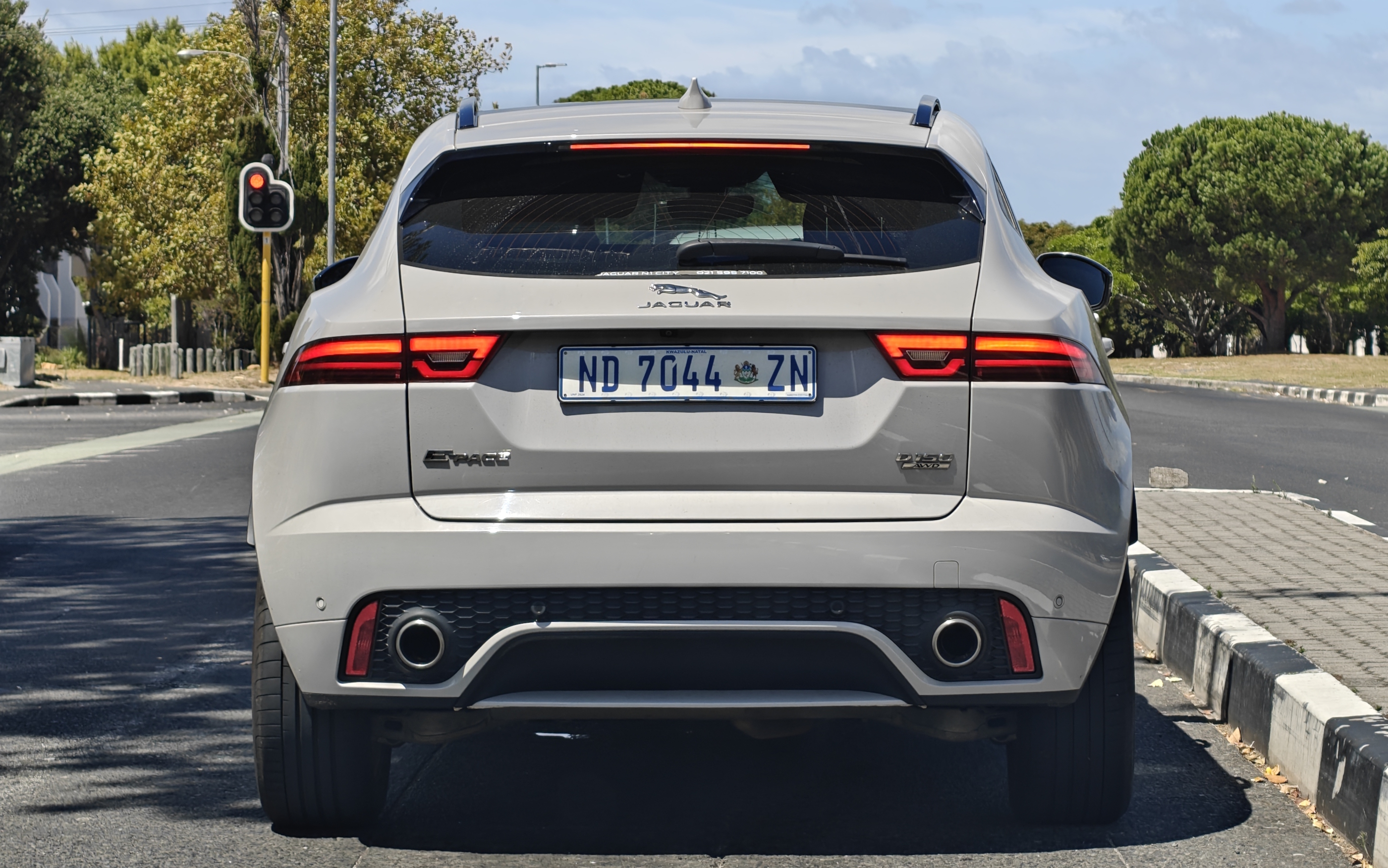
Jaguar E-Pace D150 AWD in Cape Town, South Africa, with KZN license plates

The E-Pace launched in South Africa in March 2018, with Standard, S, SE, and HSE trims, as well as a flagship E-Pace First Edition trim which was available for the first year of sale.

The vehicle was sold with five engine variants. Diesel powertrains were available with 110kW, 132kW, and 177kW outputs. Gasoline powertrains were available with 184kW and 221kW outputs. AWD and a 9-speed automatic transmission were standard across all models, as was a five-year/100,000km service plan, maintenance plan, and warranty.

=== Oceania ===
==== Australia ====
The market trims were SE and HSE, both "R-Dynamic". It was sold with an Alexa-integrated 11.4 inch touchscreen, and the bar underneath controls interior climate temperatures.

== Safety ==
ANCAP test results Jaguar E-Pace (2018, aligned with Euro NCAP)
Test	Points	%
Overall:	5 /5 stars	
Adult occupant:	33	86%
Child occupant:	43	87%
Pedestrian:	32.4	77%
Safety assist:	8.7	72%

== Sales ==
Year	China
2023	893
2024	988
2025	375
