= Chery Jaguar Land Rover =

Automotive manufacturing company headquartered in Changshu, China

Chery Jaguar Land Rover Automotive Company Ltd.
- Type: Joint venture
- Industry: Automotive
- Founded: 2012; 14 years ago
- Headquarters: Changshu, Jiangsu, China
- Area served: China
- Key people: Chris Bryant (president)
- Products: Automobiles
- Brands: Jaguar; Land Rover; Freelander
- Owner: Chery Automobile (50%); Jaguar Land Rover (50%)
- Website: Chery Jaguar Land Rover Homepage

Chery Jaguar Land Rover Automotive Company Ltd. is an automotive manufacturing company headquartered in Changshu, China.

A 50:50 joint venture between UK-headquartered Jaguar Land Rover, itself a subsidiary of Tata Motors Passenger Vehicles of India; and Chinese automaker Chery, it was formed to allow production of Jaguar Cars and Land Rover vehicles in mainland China. Chery Jaguar Land Rover's first assembly plant is in Changshu, with production having commenced in October 2014.

== History ==
Chery and Jaguar Land Rover were first reported to be in discussions about the possible creation of a Chinese joint venture manufacturing company in August 2010.

In March 2012, Chery and Jaguar Land Rover announced plans to invest an initial US$2.78 billion in a new Mainland China-based joint venture to manufacture Jaguar and Land Rover vehicles and engines, as well as the establishment of a research and development centre and the creation of a new automobile marque.

The establishment of the joint venture received the formal approval of the National Development and Reform Commission in November 2012. Construction of Chery Jaguar Land Rover's first assembly plant began in Changshu in the same month, the plant was completed in 2014, with the first Range Rover Evoque produced in October 2014.

In June 2024, Jaguar Land Rover (JLR) and Chery signed a letter of intent in electric vehicle cooperation. JLR will license the Freelander nameplate to Chery Jaguar Land Rover to produce EVs based on an Exeed EV platform called the E0X. Freelander as a brand will be separate from both JLR and Chery's brand portfolios. The vehicles will sold in China, with later plans for global exports.

As of January 2025, it is now confirmed that Chery will introduce Freelander model to the UK.

In May 2025, JLR revealed that the Chery Jaguar Land Rover would cease to produce before the end of 2026 after the joint venture with lost $18.7 million in the 2024 fiscal year. The production of the Jaguar XE, XF, and E-Pace would be ended in September 2025, and the Range Rover Evoque and Land Rover Discovery Sport would be ended by the end of 2026.

The Freelander marque was formally unveiled at the April 2026 Beijing Auto China motor show with the Freelander 8. following the March 2026 publication of the Freelander 97 concept car.

== Products ==
=== Current ===
- Freelander 8

=== Former ===
- Land Rover Discovery Sport
- Range Rover Evoque
- Jaguar XFL
- Jaguar XEL
- Jaguar E-Pace

== Gallery ==
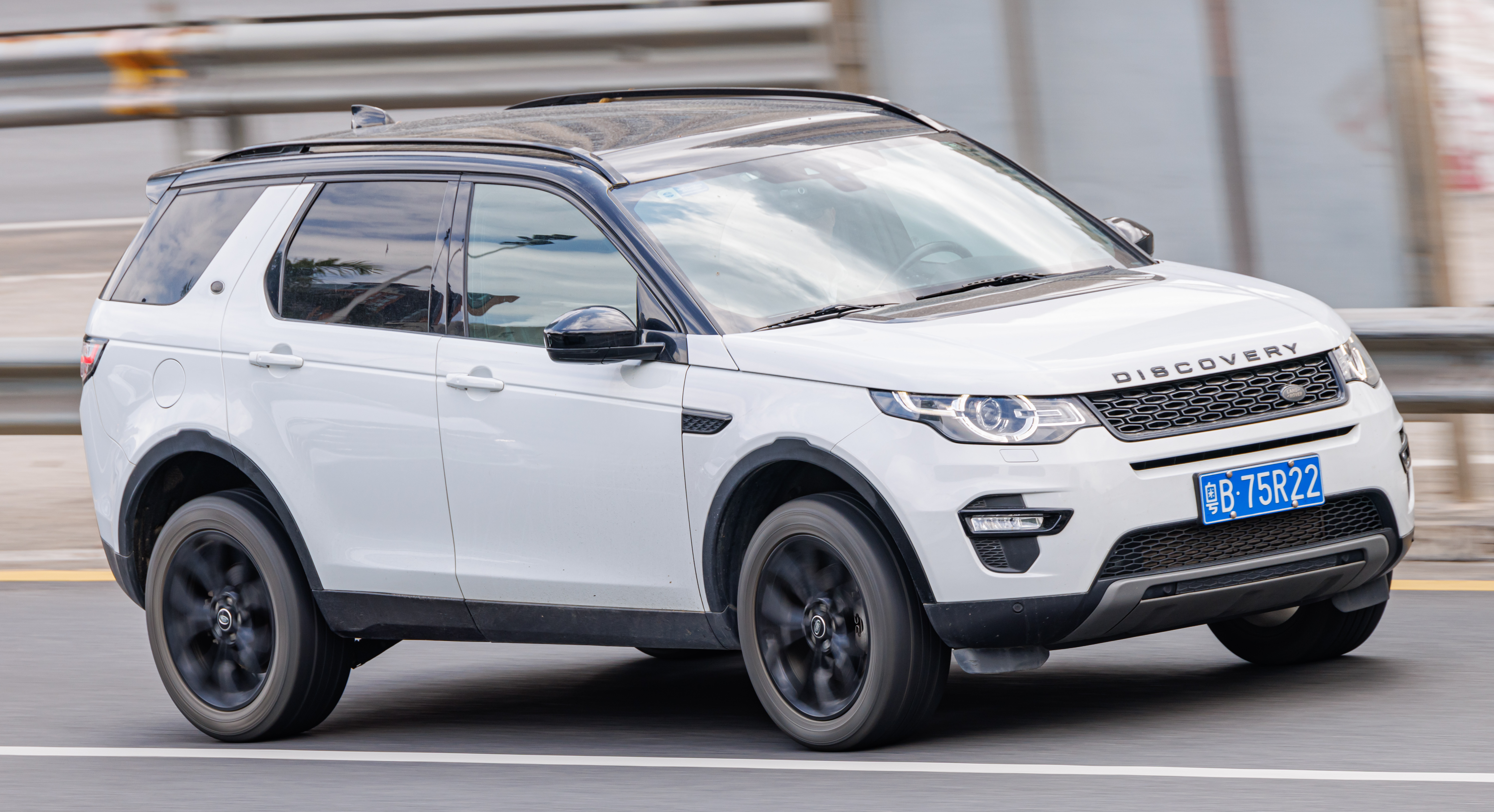
Land Rover Discovery Sport

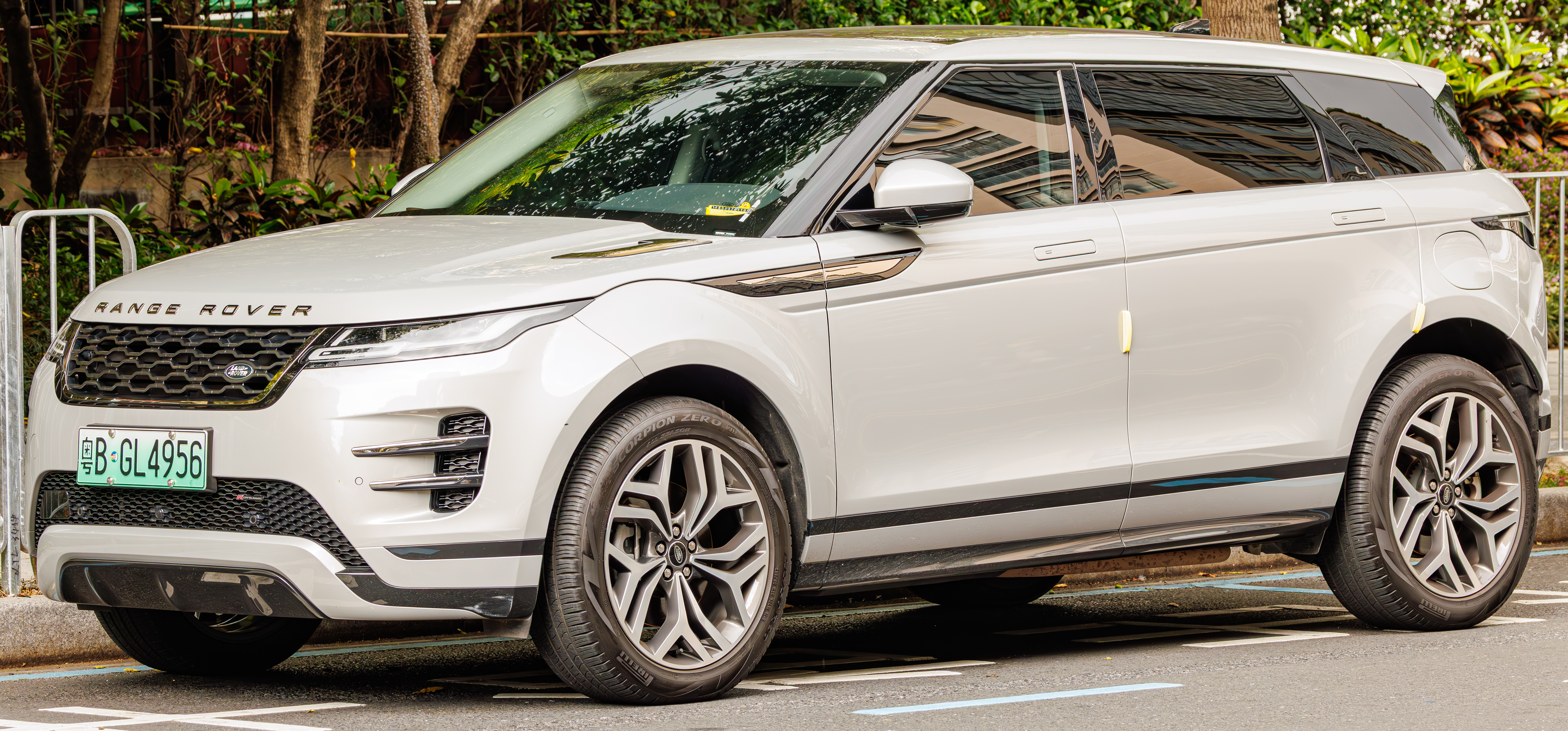
Land Rover Range Rover Evoque

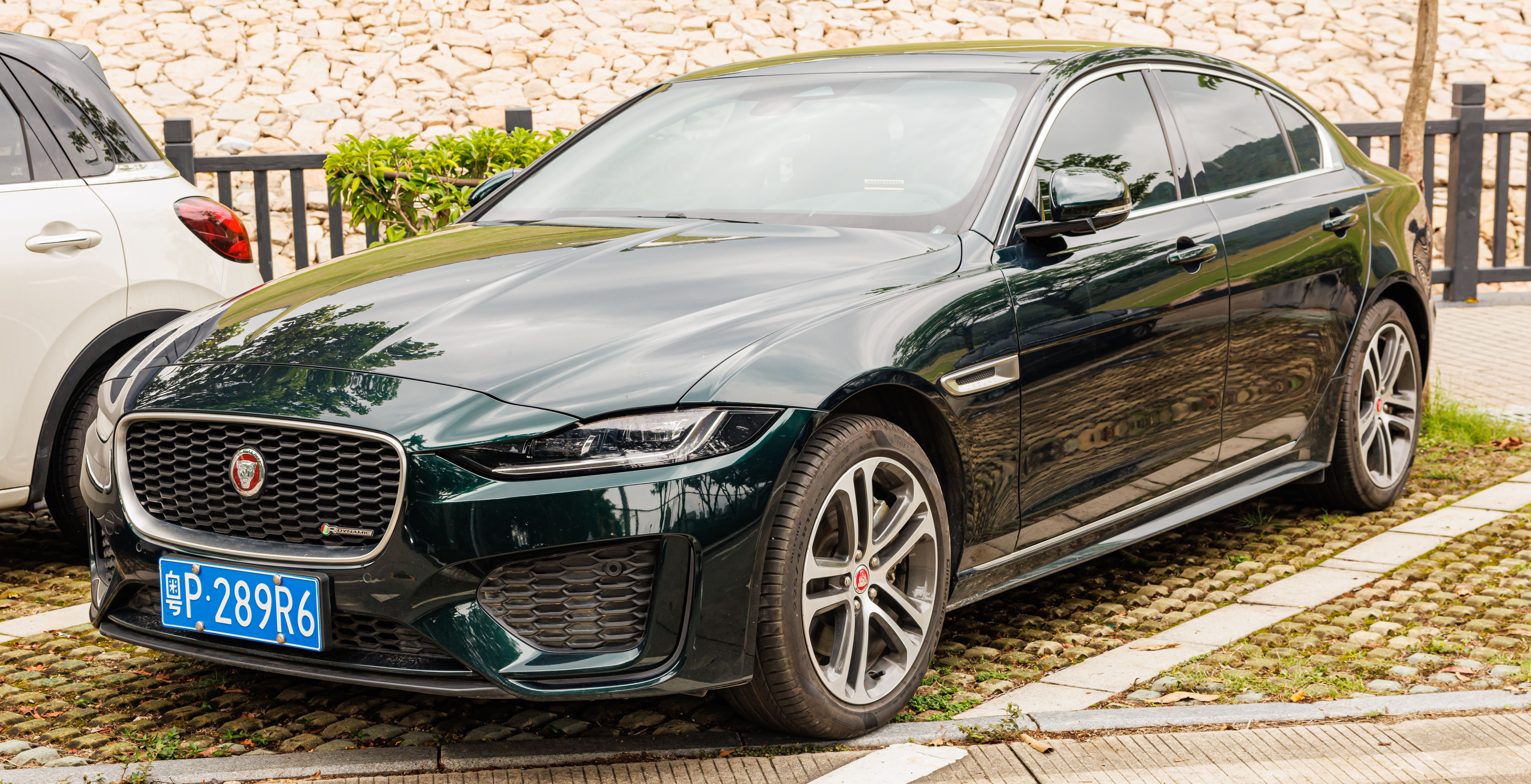
Jaguar XEL

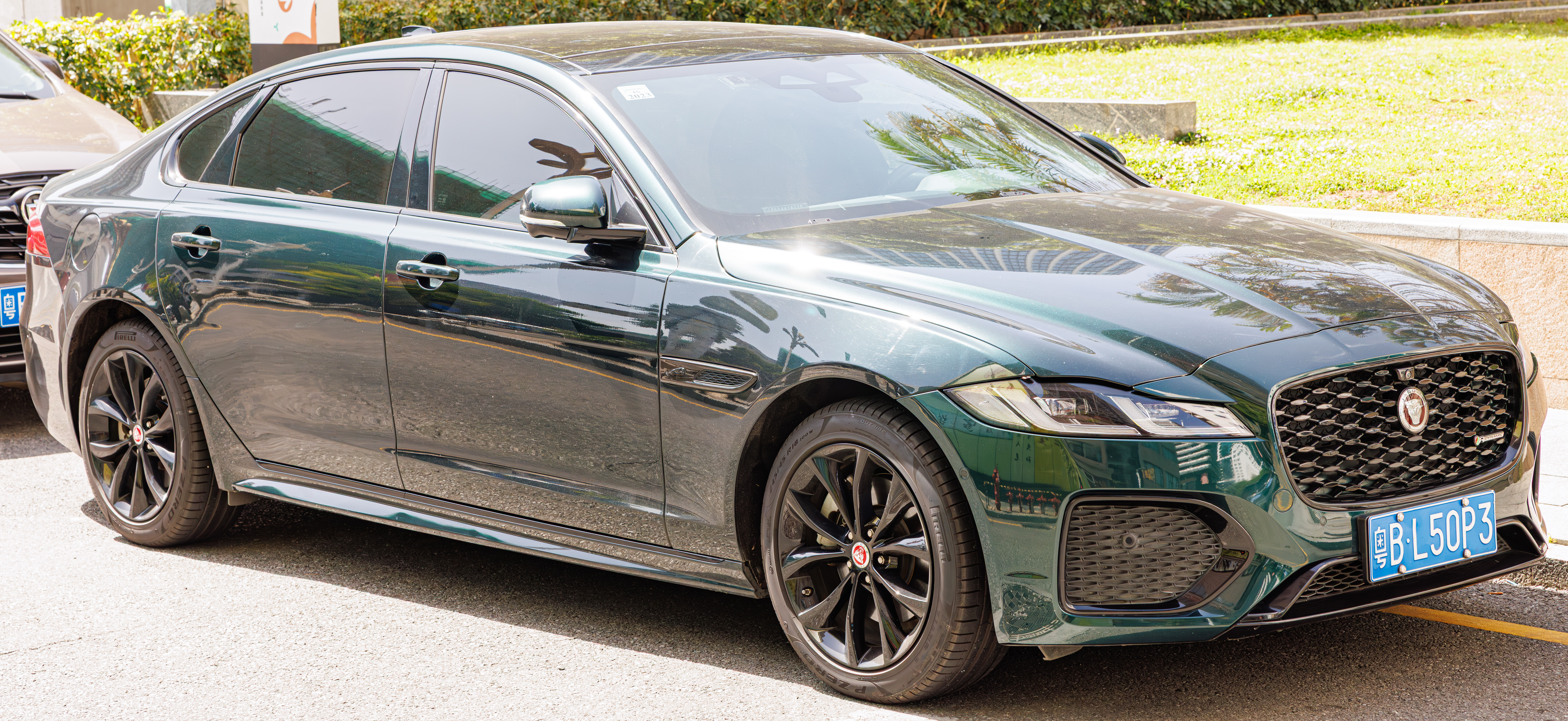
Jaguar XFL

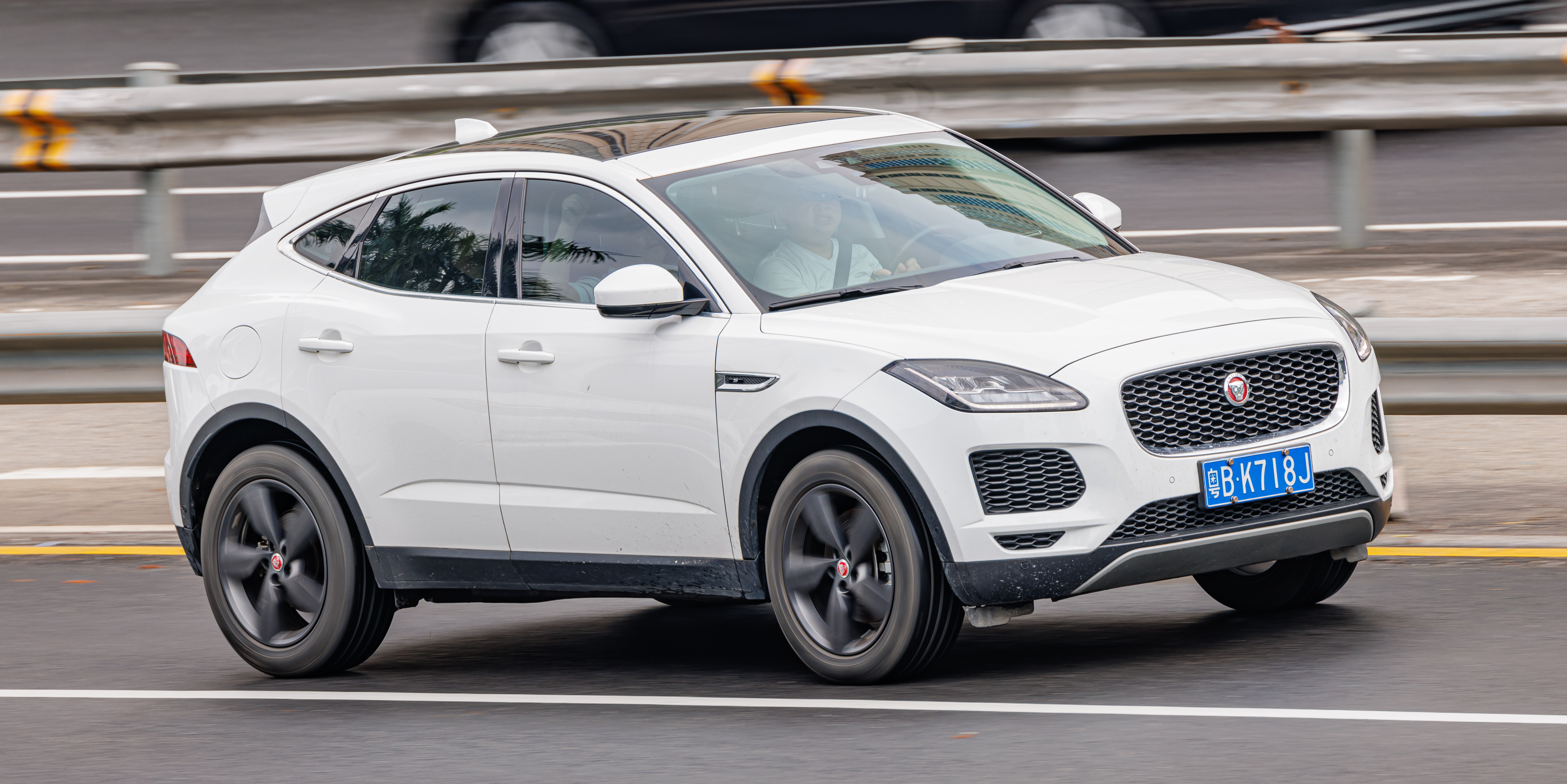
Jaguar E-Pace
