= Jaguar Cars =

Car marque owned by Jaguar Land Rover and former British car company

Jaguar
- Product type: Cars
- Current owner: Jaguar Land Rover (since 2013)
- Produced by: Jaguar Land Rover
- Country: United Kingdom
- Introduced: September 1935; 91 years ago
- Related brands: Land Rover
- Markets: Worldwide
- Previous owners: SS Cars (1935–1945); Jaguar Cars Limited (1945–2012)
- Tagline: "Copy Nothing"
- Website: www.jaguar.com

Jaguar Cars Limited
- Formerly: SS Cars (1933–1945)
- Industry: Automotive
- Predecessor: Swallow Sidecar Company
- Founded: 26 October 1933; 93 years ago
- Founder: William Lyons
- Defunct: 1 January 2013
- Fate: Merged with Land Rover in 2013
- Successor: Jaguar Land Rover
- Headquarters: Coventry, England
- Parent: Tata Motors

Jaguar (UK: /ˈdʒæɡjuər/, US: /ˈdʒæɡwɑːr/) is a British sports car and luxury vehicle brand owned by Indian multinational automobile manufacturer Tata Cars, operating under the merged division Jaguar Land Rover Limited (JLR).

Jaguar's business was founded as the Swallow Sidecar Company in 1922, originally making motorcycle sidecars before developing bodies for passenger cars. Under the ownership of SS Cars, the business expanded to complete cars made in association with Standard Motor Company, many of which bore the Jaguar model name. The company's name was changed from SS Cars to Jaguar Cars in 1945. A merger with the British Motor Corporation followed in 1966, the resulting enlarged company was renamed as British Motor Holdings (BMH), which in 1968 merged with Leyland Motor Corporation and became British Leyland, itself to be nationalised in 1975.

Jaguar was spun off from British Leyland and was listed on the London Stock Exchange in 1984 until it was acquired by Ford in 1990. Since the late 1970s, Jaguar manufactured cars for the prime minister of the United Kingdom, the most recent prime ministerial car delivery being an XJ (X351) in May 2010. The company also held royal warrants from Queen Elizabeth II and King Charles III.

In 2000, Ford also bought Land Rover, and in 2008 it sold both Jaguar Cars and Land Rover to Tata Motors. Tata created Jaguar Land Rover as a subsidiary holding company. At the operating company level, Jaguar Cars was merged with Land Rover in 2013 to form Jaguar Land Rover, the single design, manufacturing, sales company and brand owner for both Jaguar and Land Rover vehicles.

Since the Ford ownership era, Jaguar and Land Rover have used joint design facilities in engineering centres at Whitley in Coventry and Gaydon in Warwickshire and Jaguar cars have been assembled in plants at Castle Bromwich and Solihull. On 15 February 2021, Jaguar Land Rover announced that all Jaguar-badged cars would be fully electric by 2025.

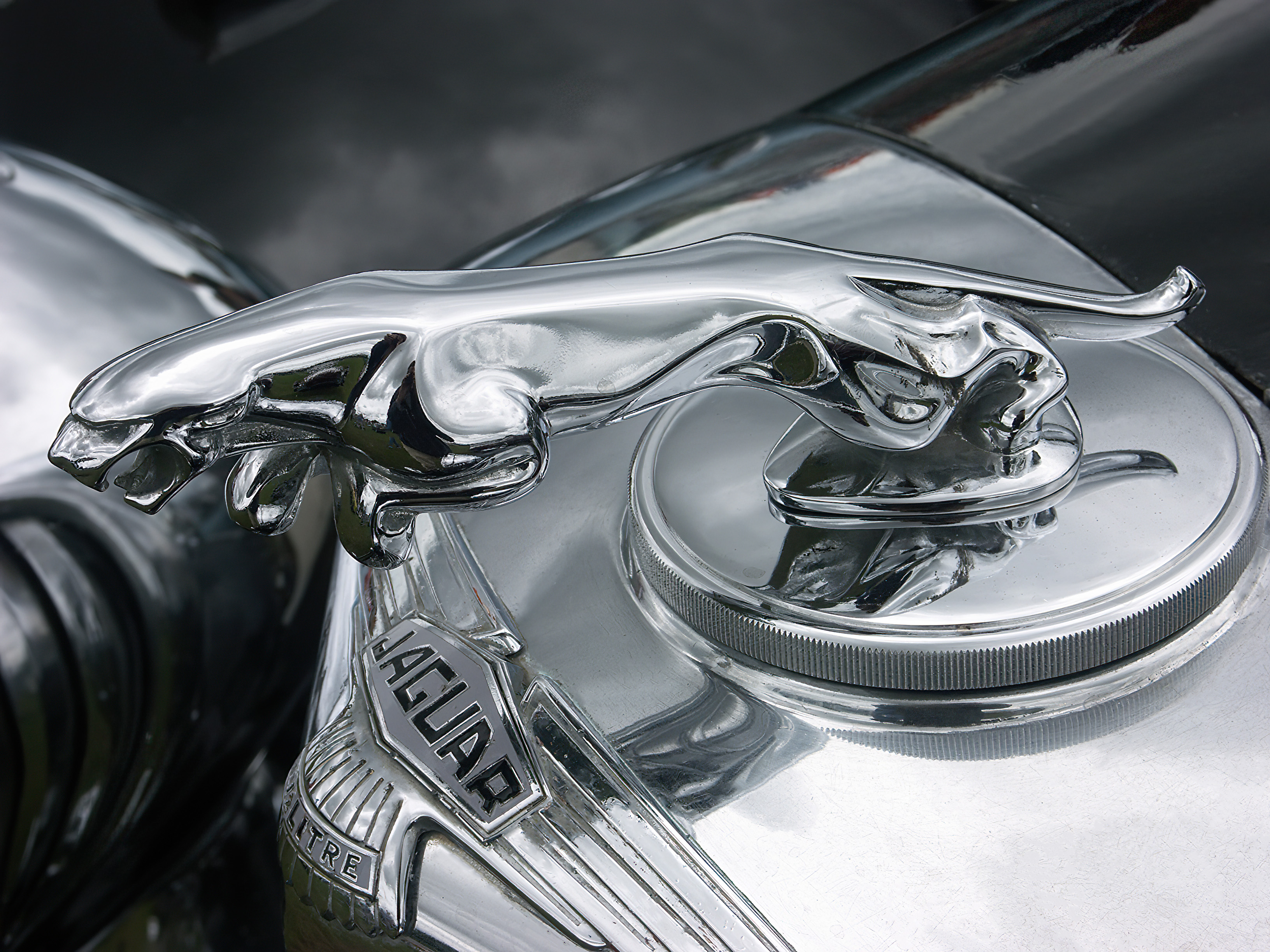
Jaguar cars bonnet mascot

== History ==
=== Founding ===
The Swallow Sidecar Company was founded in 1922 by two motorcycle enthusiasts, William Lyons and William Walmsley. In 1934, Walmsley elected to sell-out and in order to buy the Swallow business (but not the company which was liquidated) Lyons formed SS Cars, finding new capital by issuing shares to the public.

Jaguar first appeared in September 1935 as a model name on an SS 2½-litre sports saloon. A matching open two seater sports model with a 3½-litre engine was named SS Jaguar 100.

On 23 March 1945, the S. S. Cars shareholders in general meeting agreed to change the company's name to Jaguar Cars Limited. Said chairman William Lyons "Unlike S. S. the name Jaguar is distinctive and cannot be connected or confused with any similar foreign name."

Though five years of pent-up demand ensured plenty of buyers production was hampered by shortage of materials, particularly steel, issued to manufacturers until the 1950s by a central planning authority under strict government control. Jaguar sold Motor Panels, a pressed steel body manufacturing company bought in the late 1930s, to steel and components manufacturer Rubery Owen, and Jaguar bought from John Black's Standard Motor Company the plant where Standard built Jaguar's six-cylinder engines. From this time Jaguar was entirely dependent for their bodies on external suppliers, in particular then independent Pressed Steel and in 1966 that carried them into BMC, BMH and British Leyland.

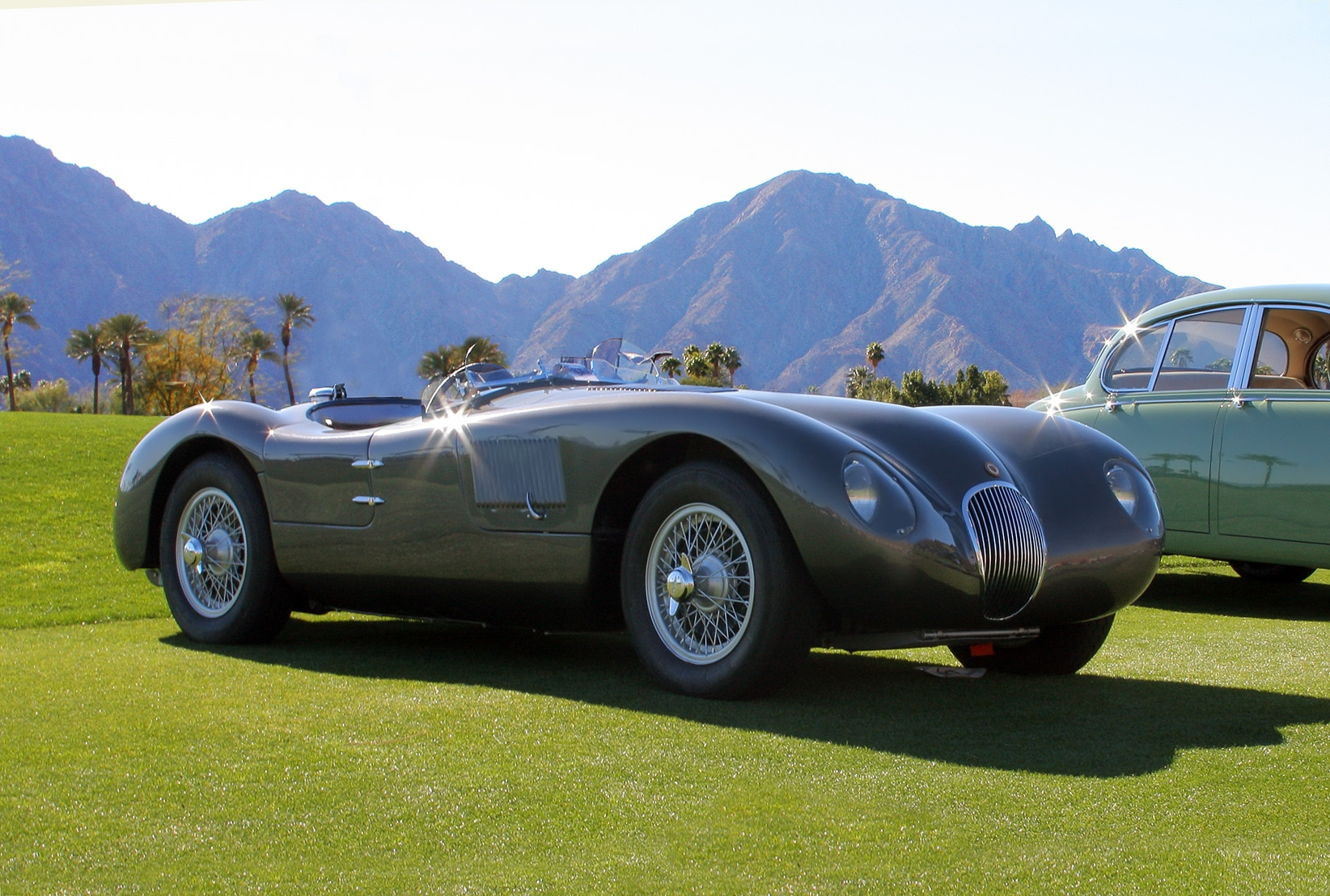
1953 Jaguar C-Type

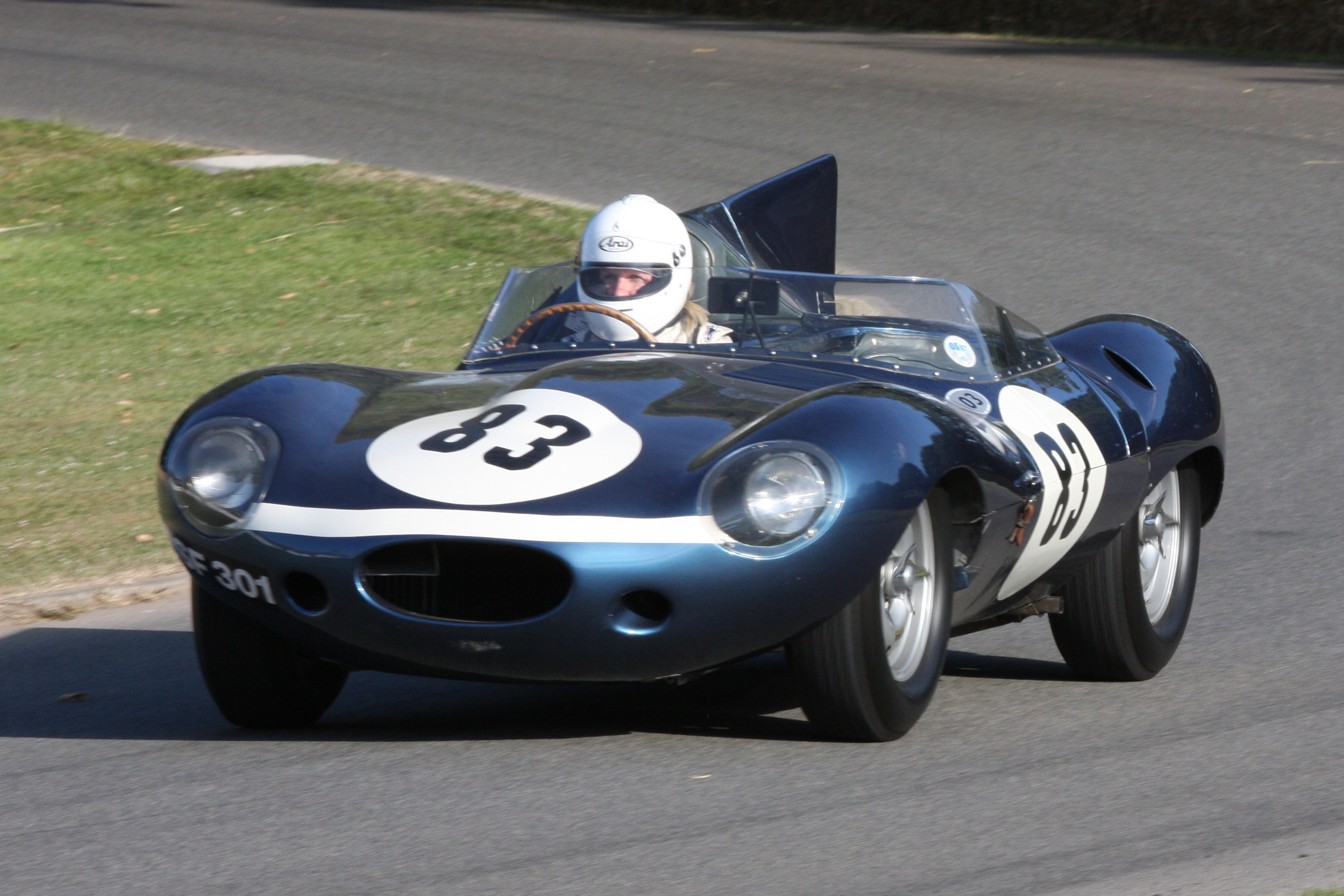
1956 Jaguar D-Type

Jaguar made its name by producing a series of successful eye-catching sports cars, the Jaguar XK120 (1948–54), Jaguar XK140 (1954–57), Jaguar XK150 (1957–61), and Jaguar E-Type (1961–75), all embodying Lyons' mantra of "value for money". The sports cars were successful in international motorsport, a path followed in the 1950s to prove the engineering integrity of the company's products.

Jaguar's sales slogan for years was "Grace, Space, Pace", a mantra epitomised by the record sales achieved by the MK VII, IX, Mks I and II saloons and later the XJ6. During the time this slogan was used, but the exact text varied.

The core of Bill Lyons' success following the Second World War was the twin-cam straight six engine, conceived pre-war and realised while engineers at the Coventry plant were dividing their time between fire-watching and designing the new power plant. It had a hemispherical cross-flow cylinder head with valves inclined from the vertical; originally at 30 degrees (inlet) and 45 degrees (exhaust) and later standardised to 45 degrees for both inlet and exhaust.

As fuel octane ratings were relatively low from 1948 onwards, three piston configuration were offered: domed (high octane), flat (medium octane), and dished (low octane).

The main designer, William Heynes, assisted by Walter Hassan, was determined to develop the Twin OHC unit. Bill Lyons agreed over misgivings from Hassan. It was risky to take what had previously been considered a racing or low-volume and cantankerous engine needing constant fettling and apply it to reasonable volume production saloon cars.

The subsequent engine (in various versions) was the mainstay powerplant of Jaguar, used in the XK 120, Mk VII Saloon, Mk I and II Saloons and XK 140 and 150. It was also employed in the E Type, itself a development from the race winning and Le Mans conquering C and D Type Sports Racing cars refined as the short-lived XKSS, a road-legal D-Type.

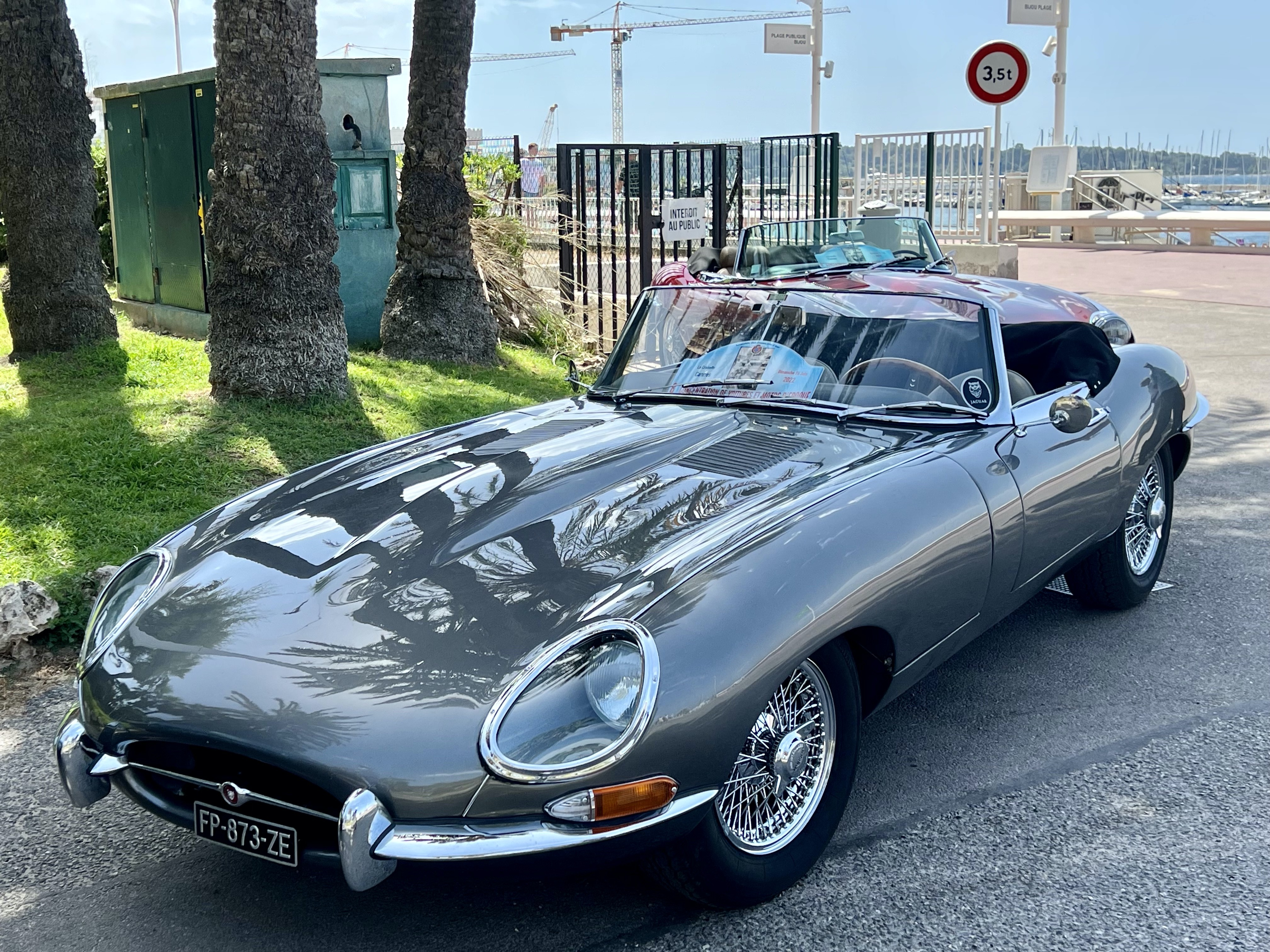
Jaguar E-Type Convertible

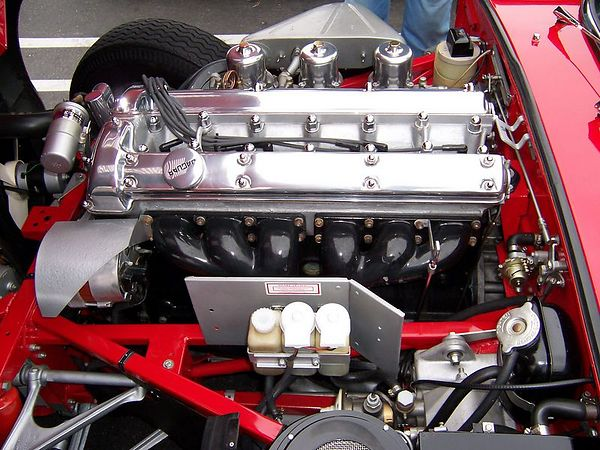
XK engine in a Jaguar E-Type

Few engine types have demonstrated such ubiquity and longevity: Jaguar used the Twin OHC XK Engine, as it came to be known, in the Jaguar XJ6 saloon from 1969 through 1992, and employed in a J60 variant as the power plant in such diverse vehicles as the British Army's Combat Vehicle Reconnaissance (Tracked) family of vehicles, as well as the Fox armoured reconnaissance vehicle, the Ferret Scout Car, and the Stonefield four-wheel-drive all-terrain lorry. Properly maintained, the standard production XK Engine would achieve 200,000 miles of useful life.

Two of the proudest moments in Jaguar's long history in motor sport involved winning the Le Mans 24 hours race, firstly in 1951 and again in 1953. Victory at the 1955 Le Mans was overshadowed by it being the occasion of the worst motorsport accident in history. Later in the hands of the Scottish racing team Ecurie Ecosse two more wins were added in 1956 and 1957.

Jaguar produced a number of cars that include the 3-litre, 3½ litres, the Mark VII, VIII, IX, the compact Mark I, 2, the XJ6 and the sports saloon XJ12.

Combined with the trend-setting XK 120, XK 140, and XK 150 series of sports car, and nonpareil E-Type, Jaguar's elan as a prestige motorcar manufacturer had few rivals. The company's post-War achievements were notable, considering both the shortages that drove Britain (the Ministry of Supply still allocated raw materials) and the state of metallurgical development of the era.

=== Daimler ===
In 1950, Jaguar agreed to lease from the Ministry of Supply the Daimler Shadow 2 factory in Browns Lane, Allesley, Coventry, which at the time was being used by Daimler and moved to the new site from Foleshill over the next 12 months. Jaguar purchased Daimler, not to be confused with Daimler-Benz or Daimler AG, in 1960 from BSA. From the late 1960s, Jaguar used the Daimler marque as a brand name for their most luxurious saloons.

=== An end to independence (1965–1984) ===
Pressed Steel Company Limited made all Jaguar's (monocoque) bodies leaving provision and installation of the mechanicals to Jaguar. In mid-1965 British Motor Corporation (BMC), the Austin-Morris combine, bought Pressed Steel. Lyons became concerned about the future of Jaguar, partly because of the threat to ongoing supplies of bodies, and partly because of his age and lack of an heir. He therefore accepted BMC's offer to merge with Jaguar to form British Motor (Holdings) Limited. At a press conference on 11 July 1965 at the Great Eastern Hotel in London, Lyons and BMC chairman George Harriman announced, "Jaguar Group of companies is to merge with The British Motor Corporation Ltd., as the first step towards the setting up of a joint holding company to be called British Motor (Holdings) Limited". In due course BMC changed its name to British Motor Holdings at the end of 1966.

BMH was pushed by the Government to merge with Leyland Motor Corporation Limited, manufacturer of Leyland bus and truck, Standard-Triumph and, since 1967, Rover vehicles. The result was British Leyland Motor Corporation, a new holding company which appeared in 1968, but the combination was not a success. A combination of poor decision making by the board along with the financial difficulties of, especially, the Austin-Morris division (previously BMC) led to the Ryder Report and to effective nationalisation in 1975.

=== Temporary return to independence (1984–1989) ===
Over the next few years it became clear that because of the low regard for many of the group's products insufficient capital could be provided to develop and begin manufacture of new models, including Jaguars, particularly if Jaguar were to remain a part of the group.

Jaguar XJ, a luxury saloon car

In July 1984, Jaguar was floated off as a separate company on the London Stock Exchange – one of the Thatcher government's many privatisations– to create its own track record.

Installed as chairman in 1980, Sir John Egan is credited for Jaguar's unprecedented prosperity immediately after privatisation. In early 1986 Egan reported he had tackled the main problems that were holding Jaguar back from selling more cars: quality control, lagging delivery schedules, poor productivity. He laid off about one third of the company's roughly 10,000 employees to cut costs. Commentators later pointed out he exploited an elderly model range (on which all development costs had been written off) and raised prices. He also intensified the effort to improve Jaguar's quality. In the US the price increases were masked by a favourable exchange rate.

=== Ford era (1989–2008) ===
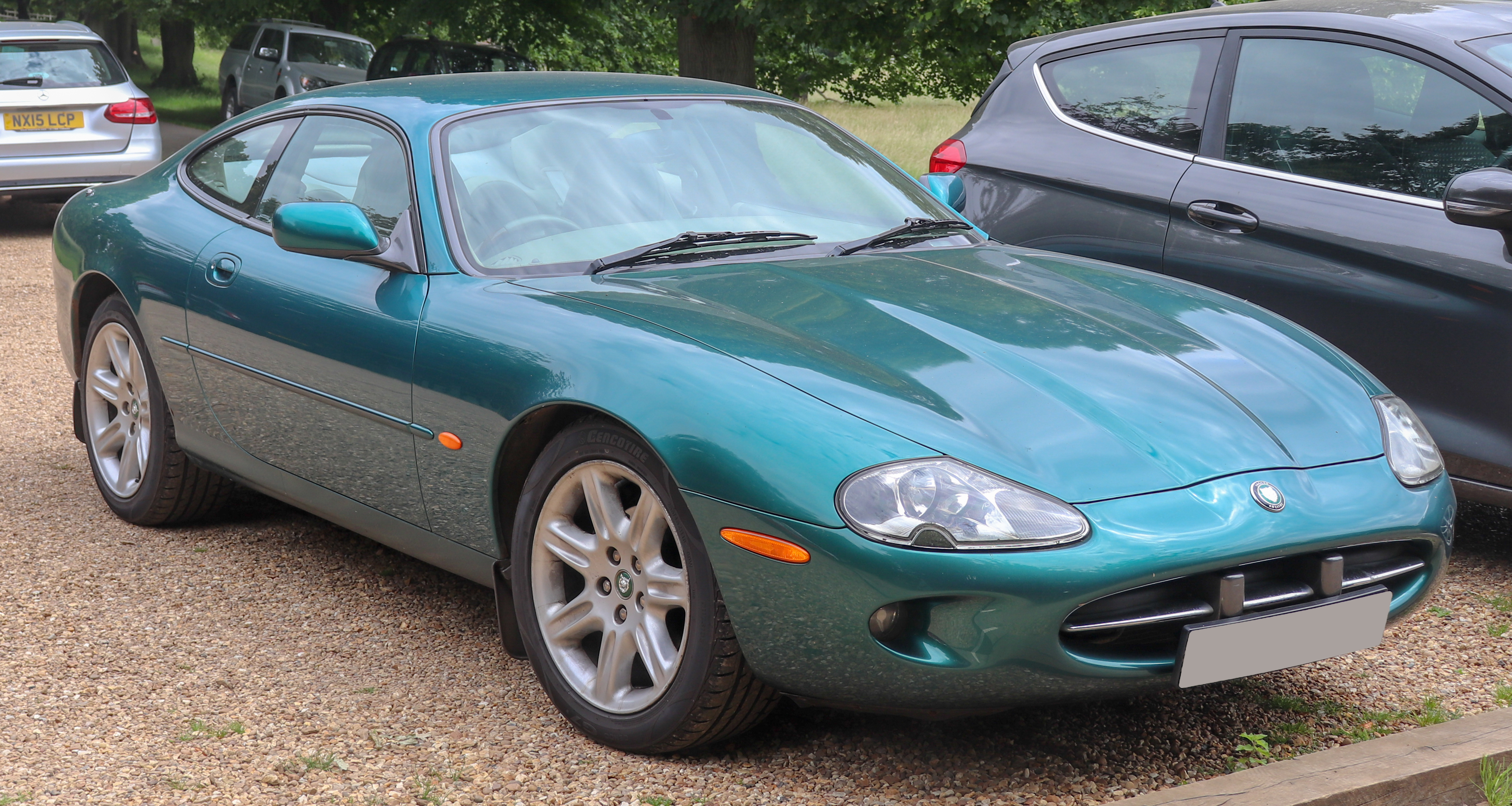
1997 Jaguar XK8 Coupe 4.0

Ford made offers to Jaguar's US and UK shareholders to buy their shares in November 1989; Jaguar's listing on the London Stock Exchange was removed on 28 February 1990. In 1999 it became part of Ford's new Premier Automotive Group along with Aston Martin, Volvo Cars and, from 2000, Land Rover. Under Ford's ownership, Jaguar never made a profit.

Under Ford's ownership Jaguar expanded its range of products with the launch of the S-Type in 1999 and X-type in 2001. After PAG acquired Land Rover in May 2000 purchase by Ford, Land Rover became closely associated with Jaguar. In many countries they shared a common sales and distribution network (including shared dealerships), and some models shared components, although the only shared production facility was Halewood Body & Assembly – which manufactured the technically related X-Type and the Freelander 2. Operationally the two companies were effectively integrated under a common management structure within Ford's PAG.

On 11 June 2007, Ford announced that it planned to sell Jaguar, along with Land Rover and retained the services of Goldman Sachs, Morgan Stanley and HSBC to advise it on the deal. The sale was initially expected to be announced by September 2007, but was delayed until March 2008. Private equity firms such as Alchemy Partners of the UK, TPG Capital, Ripplewood Holdings (which hired former Ford Europe executive Sir Nick Scheele to head its bid), Cerberus Capital Management and One Equity Partners (owned by JPMorgan Chase and managed by former Ford executive Jacques Nasser) of the US, Tata Motors of India and a consortium comprising Mahindra & Mahindra (an automobile manufacturer from India) and Apollo Management all initially expressed interest in purchasing the marques from Ford.

Before the sale was announced, Anthony Bamford, chairman of British excavator manufacturer JCB had expressed interest in purchasing the company in August 2006, but backed out upon learning that the sale would also involve Land Rover, which he did not wish to buy. On Christmas Eve of 2007, Mahindra and Mahindra backed out of the race for both brands, citing complexities in the deal.

=== Tata Motors era (2008–present) ===
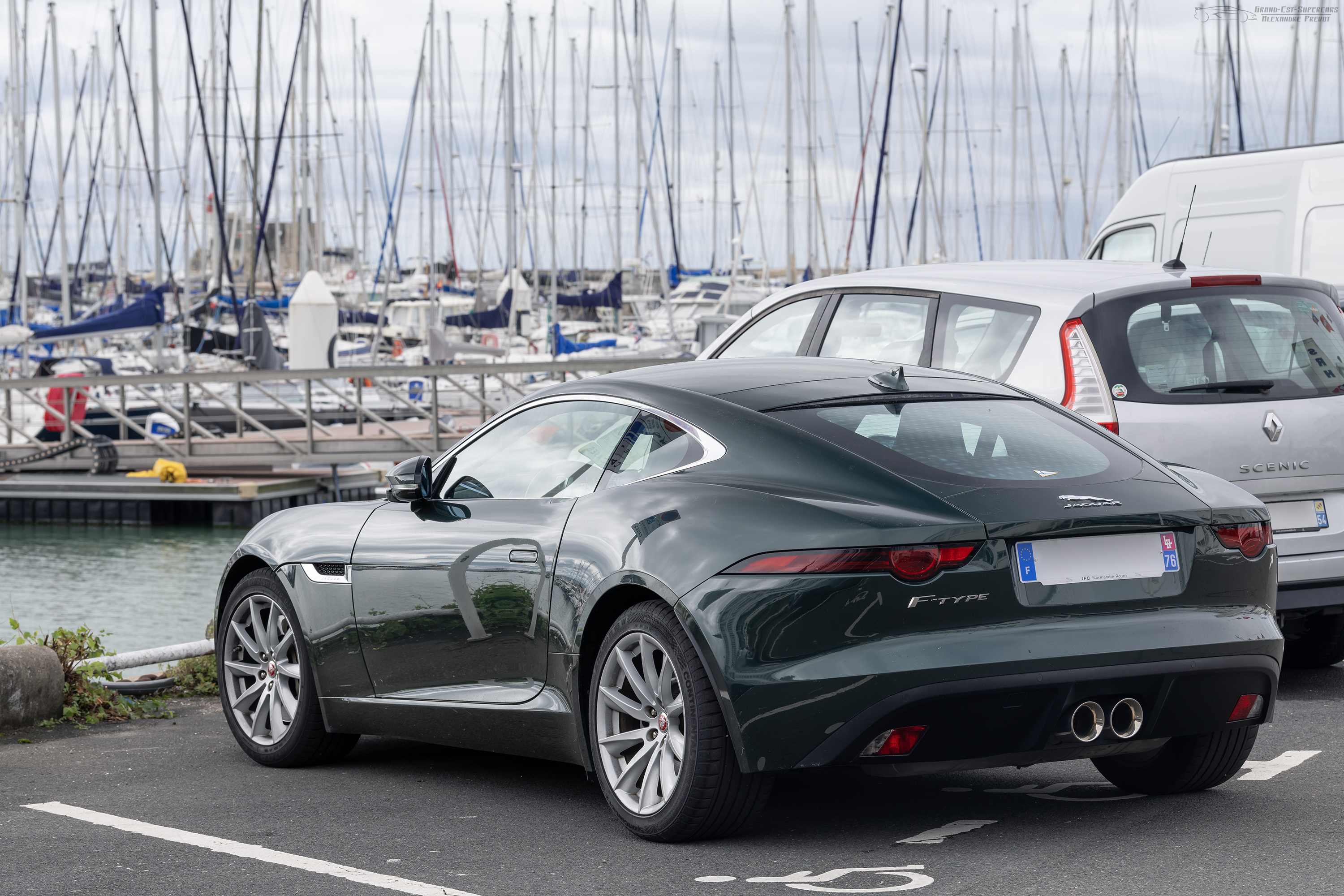
Jaguar F-Type

On 1 January 2008, Ford announced Tata as the preferred bidder. Tata Motors also received endorsements from the Transport And General Worker's Union (TGWU)-Amicus combine as well as from Ford. According to the rules of the auction process, this announcement would not automatically disqualify any other potential suitor. However, Ford (as well as representatives of Unite) would now be able to enter into detailed discussions with Tata concerning issues ranging from labour concerns (job security and pensions), technology (IT systems and engine production) and intellectual property, as well as the final sale price. Ford would also open its books for a more comprehensive due diligence by Tata. On 18 March 2008, Reuters reported that American bankers Citigroup and JP Morgan would finance the deal with a US$3 billion loan.

On 26 March 2008, Ford announced that it had agreed to sell its Jaguar and Land Rover operations to Tata Motors of India, and that they expected to complete the sale by the end of the second quarter of 2008. Included in the deal were the rights to three other British marques, Jaguar's own Daimler, as well as the dormant Lanchester and Rover brands. On 2 June 2008, the sale to Tata was completed at a cost of £1.7 billion.

On 18 January 2008, Tata Motors, a part of the Tata Group, established Jaguar Land Rover (JLR) as a British-registered and wholly owned subsidiary. The company was to be used as a holding company for the acquisition of the two businesses from Ford – Jaguar Cars Limited and Land Rover. That acquisition was completed on 2 June 2008. On 1 January 2013, the group, which had been operating as two separate companies (Jaguar Cars Limited and Land Rover), although on an integrated basis, underwent a fundamental restructuring. The parent company was renamed to Jaguar Land Rover Automotive PLC, Jaguar Cars Limited was renamed to Jaguar Land Rover Limited and the assets (excluding certain Chinese interests) of Land Rover were transferred to it. The consequence was that Jaguar Land Rover Limited became responsible in the UK for the design, manufacture and marketing of both Jaguar and Land Rover products.

Sales in 2013 amounted to 76,668 units, an increase of 42% compared to 2012. The most significant growth was observed in Germany and the United States.

In 2020, the former CEO of the French company Renault, Thierry Bolloré, replaced Ralf Speth as the head of Jaguar Land Rover.

In 2023, JLR announced plans to move Jaguar further upmarket, following years of zero-profitability and poor sales. The holding company detailed its plans to downsize Jaguar into a lower volume manufacturer, competing closer to the likes of Bentley and Porsche. In June 2024, the company stopped production of every model except for the F-Pace, aligning goals to fully electrify the marque by 2025. Instead, three brand-new electric models will be introduced on the new JEA platform, starting with a four-door electric grand tourer in 2025.

=== Electrification (2025–present) ===
On 19 November 2024, Jaguar unveiled an advertisement showcasing its new logo and branding ahead of its relaunch in 2026 as an electric-only marque. The rebrand marked the introduction of a new typeface, colour palette, as well as new device mark, in a direction the company referred to as 'exuberant modernism'.

The change was markedly controversial, being met with criticism online, notably including that from Elon Musk, American comedian Stephen Colbert, and British politician Nigel Farage. Critics pointed out the rebrand's alienation of Jaguar's traditional customers, accusing the company of 'going woke'. Others have instead commended the rebrand as marketing 'genius', having captured mainstream attention for Jaguar worldwide online and on mainstream media.

On 4 December 2024, Jaguar revealed the Type 00 concept car at Miami Art Week, a non-production model which showcases the brand's design direction for its future electric cars. Like its rebrand a couple weeks prior, the car was met with a similarly polarised reception, inviting both derision and praise.

Following the rebranding and the new strategy, Jaguar ended the production of combustion engine vehicles in 2025, starting an interim period for the company to transition into a new all-electric lineup by 2026. Sales dropped by 97.5% in 2025 as a result of Jaguar's cessation of new car production, with its sales limited to older cars on stock from previous years.

== Plants ==
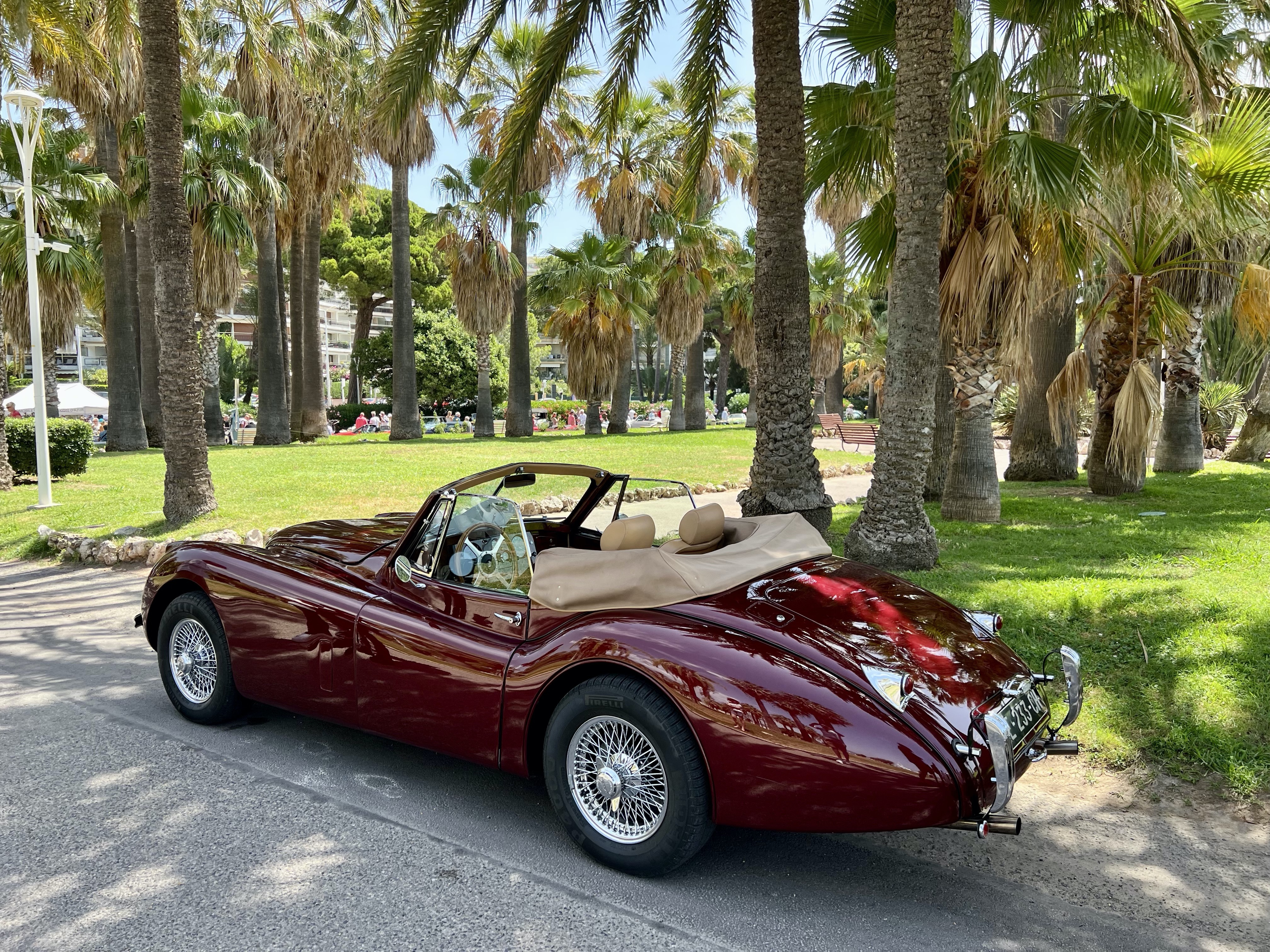
Jaguar XK140 Drophead Coupe

From 1922 the Swallow Sidecar company (SSC) was located in Blackpool. The company moved to Holbrook Lane, Coventry in 1928 when demand for the Austin Swallow became too great for the factory's capacity. The company started using the Jaguar name whilst based in Holbrook Lane.

In 1951, having outgrown the original Coventry site they moved to Browns Lane, which had been a wartime "shadow factory" run by The Daimler Company. The Browns Lane plant ceased trim and final operations in 2005, the X350 XJ having already moved to Castle Bromwich two years prior, with the XK and S-Type following. The Browns Lane plant, which continued producing veneer trim for a while and housed the Jaguar Daimler Heritage centre until it moved to the British Motor Museum site, has now been demolished and is being redeveloped.

Jaguar acquired the Whitley engineering centre from Peugeot in 1986, the facility having been part of Chrysler Europe which the French firm had owned since the late 1970s. The decision to offload the site to Jaguar came as Peugeot discontinued the Talbot marque for passenger cars. In 2016, Jaguar also moved into part of the old Peugeot/Chrysler/Rootes site in Ryton-on-Dunsmore which closed a decade earlier – this now is the home of Jaguar Land Rover's classic restoration operation.

Jaguar's Radford plant, originally a Daimler bus plant but later a Jaguar engine and axle plant, was closed by Ford in 1997 when it moved all Jaguar engine production to its Bridgend facility.

In 2000, Ford turned its Halewood plant over to Jaguar following the discontinuation of its long running Escort that year for Jaguar's new X-Type model. It was later joined by the second-generation Land Rover Freelander 2, from 2007. Jaguars ceased being produced at Halewood in 2009 following the discontinuation of the X-Type; Halewood now becoming a Land Rover-only plant.

Since Jaguar Land Rover was formed following the merger of Jaguar Cars with Land Rover, facilities have been shared across several JLR sites, most of which are used by both Jaguar and Land Rover.

== Upcoming car models ==
=== Type 01 ===
Jaguar Type 01 2027–

Jaguar's first model following the transition, the Type 01 will start production in Solihull in 2027 with a global reveal in New York in October 2026.

== Discontinued car models ==
Jaguar has ceased production of all internal combustion cars as of December 2025, following the production of the final F-Pace on 19 December 2025. Production on all other previous models had been discontinued in December 2024, in anticipation of the brand's transition to being all-electric.

=== E-Pace ===
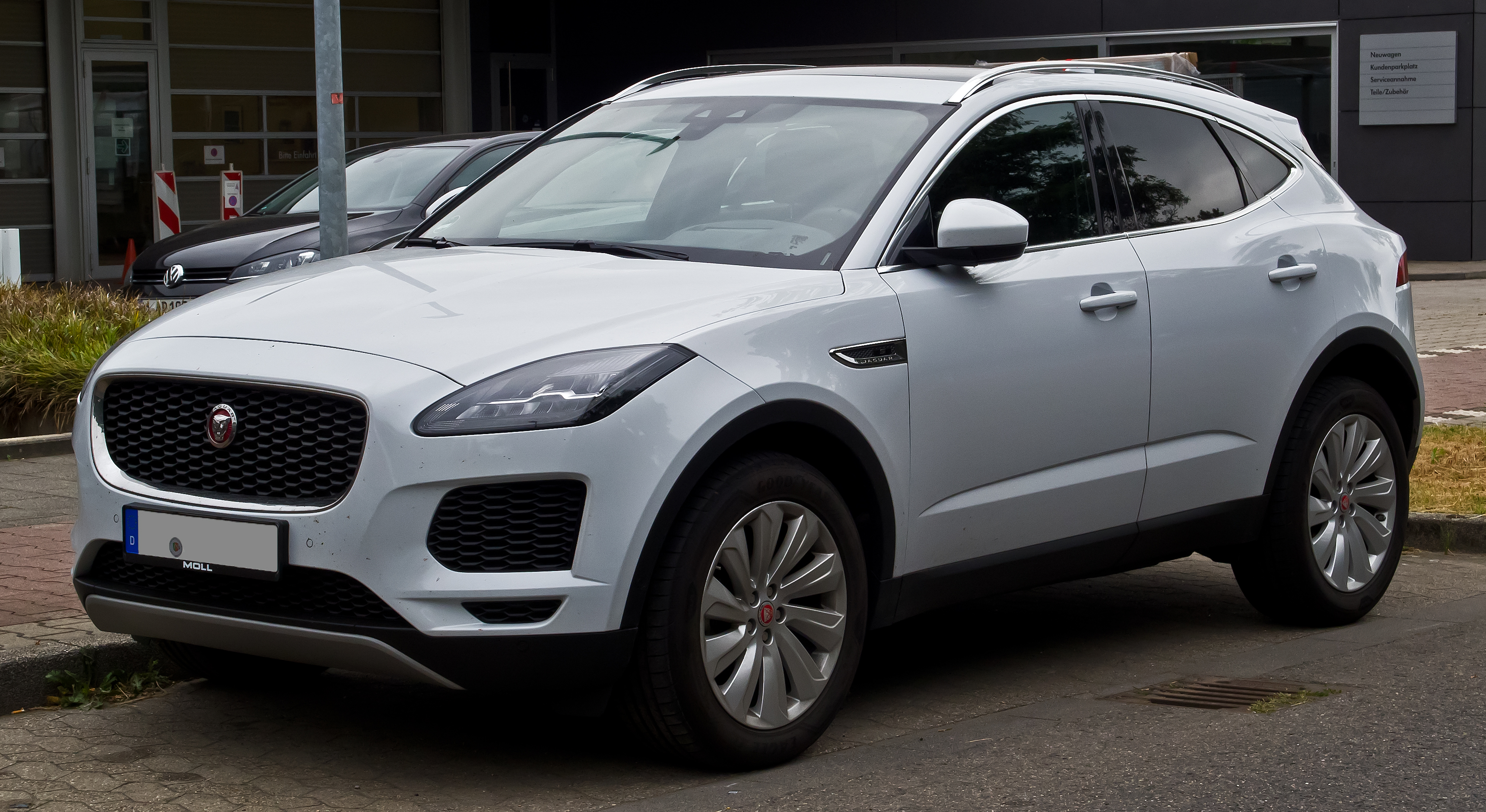
Jaguar E-Pace 2017–2024

The Jaguar E-Pace is a compact SUV, officially revealed on 13 July 2017. Production of the E-Pace, which was outsourced to Magna Steyr in Graz, Austria, stopped in December 2024.

=== F-Type ===
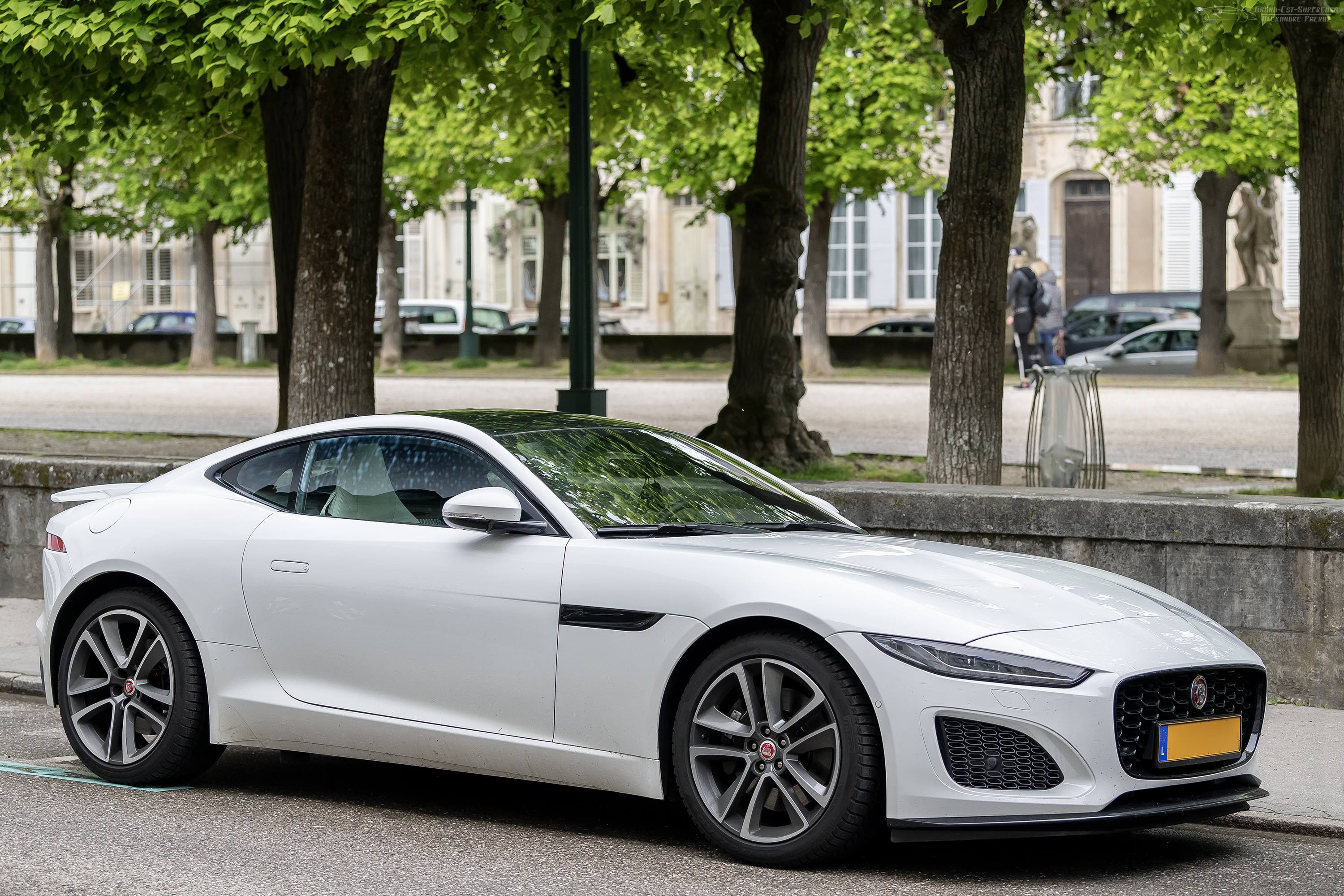
Jaguar F-Type 2013–2024

The F-Type convertible was launched at the 2012 Paris Motor Show, following its display at the Goodwood Festival of Speed in June 2012, and is billed as a successor to the legendary E-Type. In fact, the Series III E-Type already had a successor, in the form of the XJS, which was in turn replaced by the XK8 and XKR. The F-Type nevertheless returns to the 2-seat plan that was lost with the introduction of the Series III E-Type, which was available only in a 2+2-seat configuration. It was developed following the positive reaction to Jaguar's C-X16 concept car at the 2011 Frankfurt Auto Show. Sales began in 2013 with three engine choices; two variants of the AJ126 V6 petrol engine and the AJ133 V8 petrol engine. Production ended in June 2024, by which time 87,731 examples had been built.

=== F-Pace ===
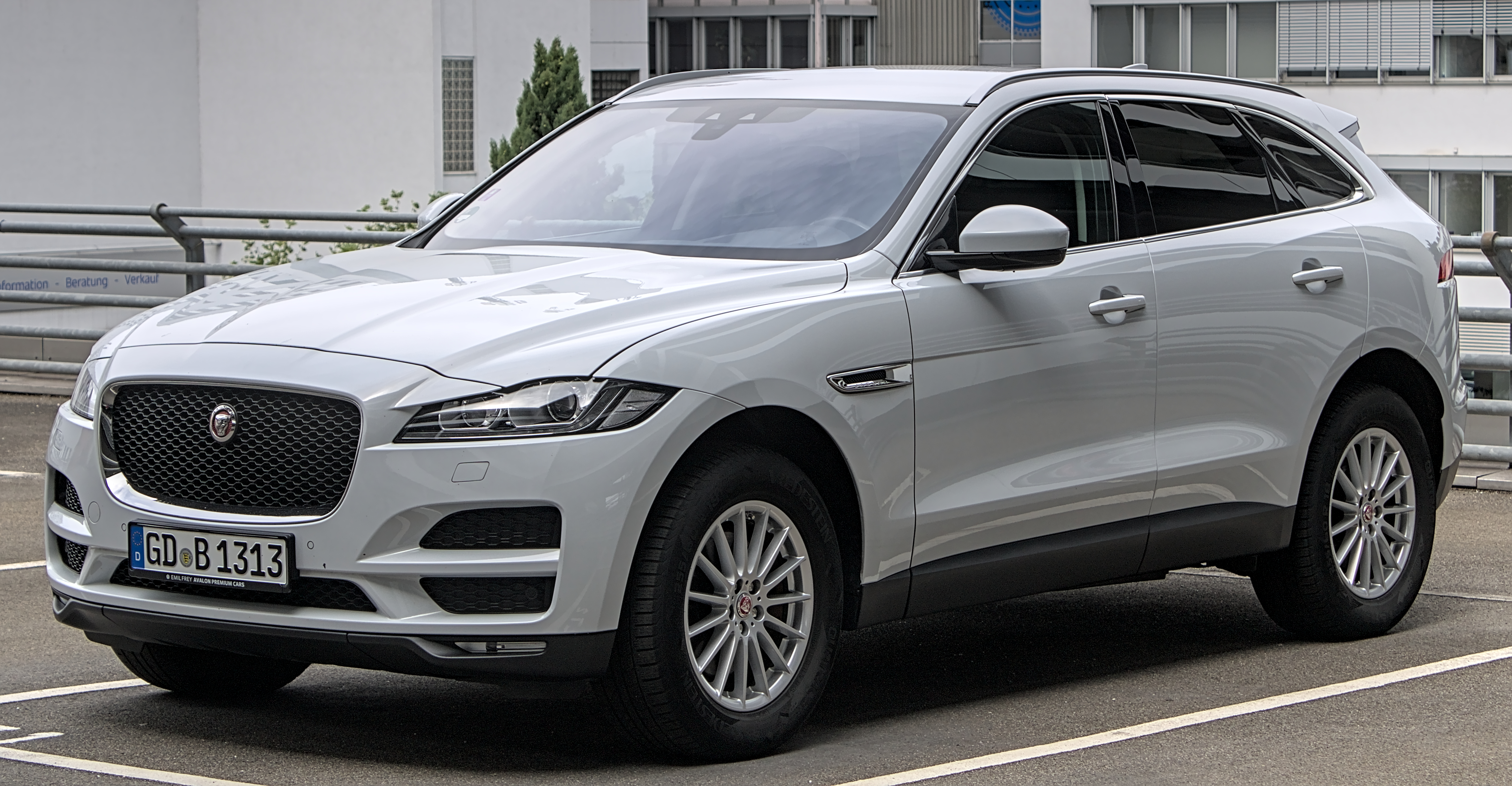
Jaguar F-Pace 2016–2025

The F-Pace is a compact luxury crossover SUV – the first SUV from Jaguar. It was unveiled at the International Motor Show Germany in Frankfurt in September 2015. The F-Pace was to remain in production until early 2026, ahead of the brand's electric relaunch, but the last F-Pace was built on 19 December 2025.

=== I-Pace ===
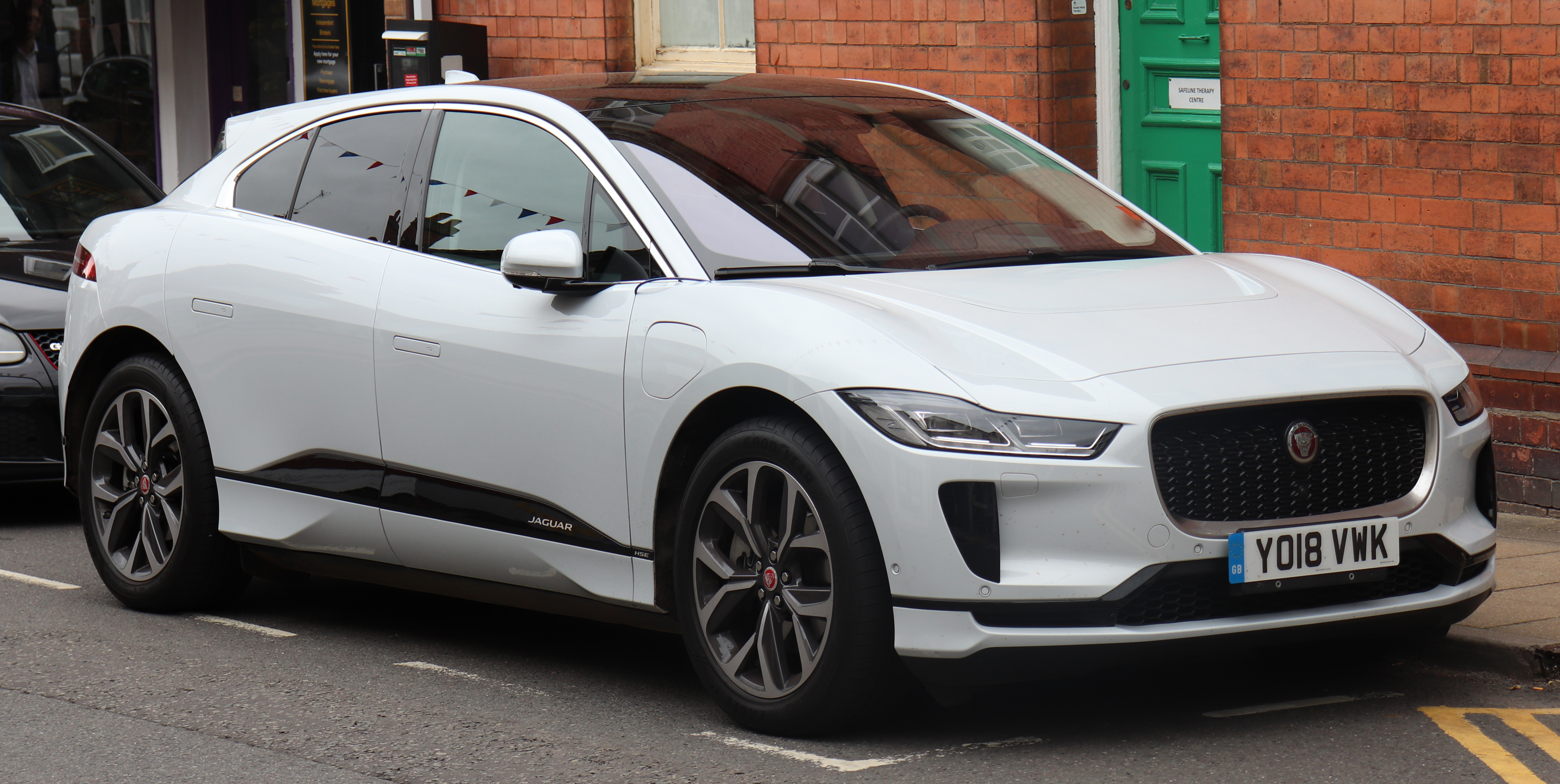
Jaguar I-Pace 2018–2024

The Jaguar I-Pace is an electric SUV, officially revealed on 1 March 2018. It is Jaguar's first electric car. Amid slowing sales and a change in corporate vision, production of the I-Pace ended in December 2024.

=== XE ===
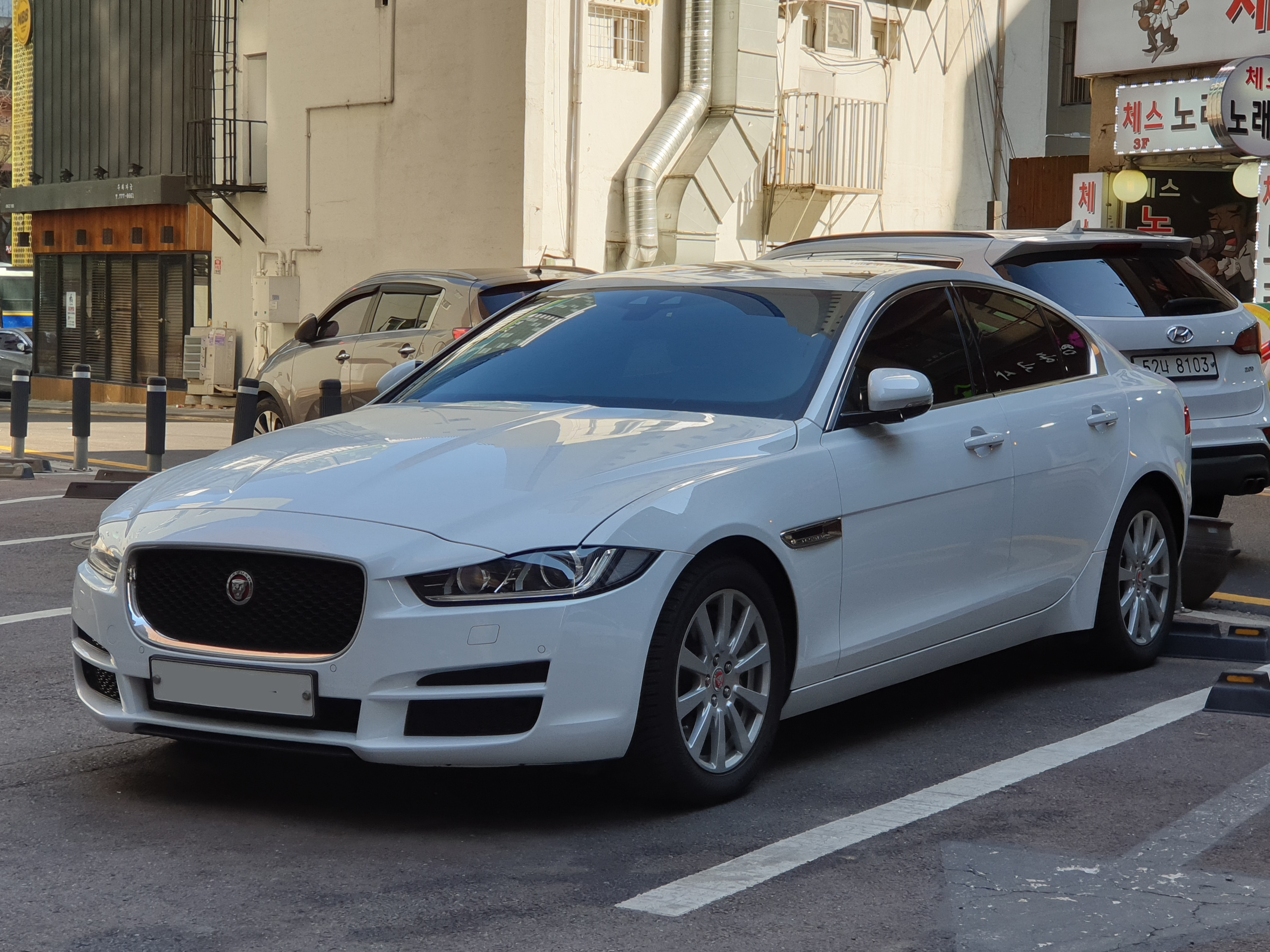
Jaguar XE 2015–2024

The XE is the first compact executive Jaguar since the 2009 model year X-Type and is the first of several Jaguar models to be built using Jaguar's new modular aluminium architecture, moving the company away from the Ford derived platforms that were used in the past for the X-Type and XF. The use of Jaguar's own platform allows the XE to feature either rear-wheel drive or all-wheel drive configurations, and it is the first car in its segment with an aluminium monocoque structure. Originally announced at the 2014 Geneva Motor Show with sales scheduled for 2015. Production of the XE ceased in mid 2024.

=== XF ===
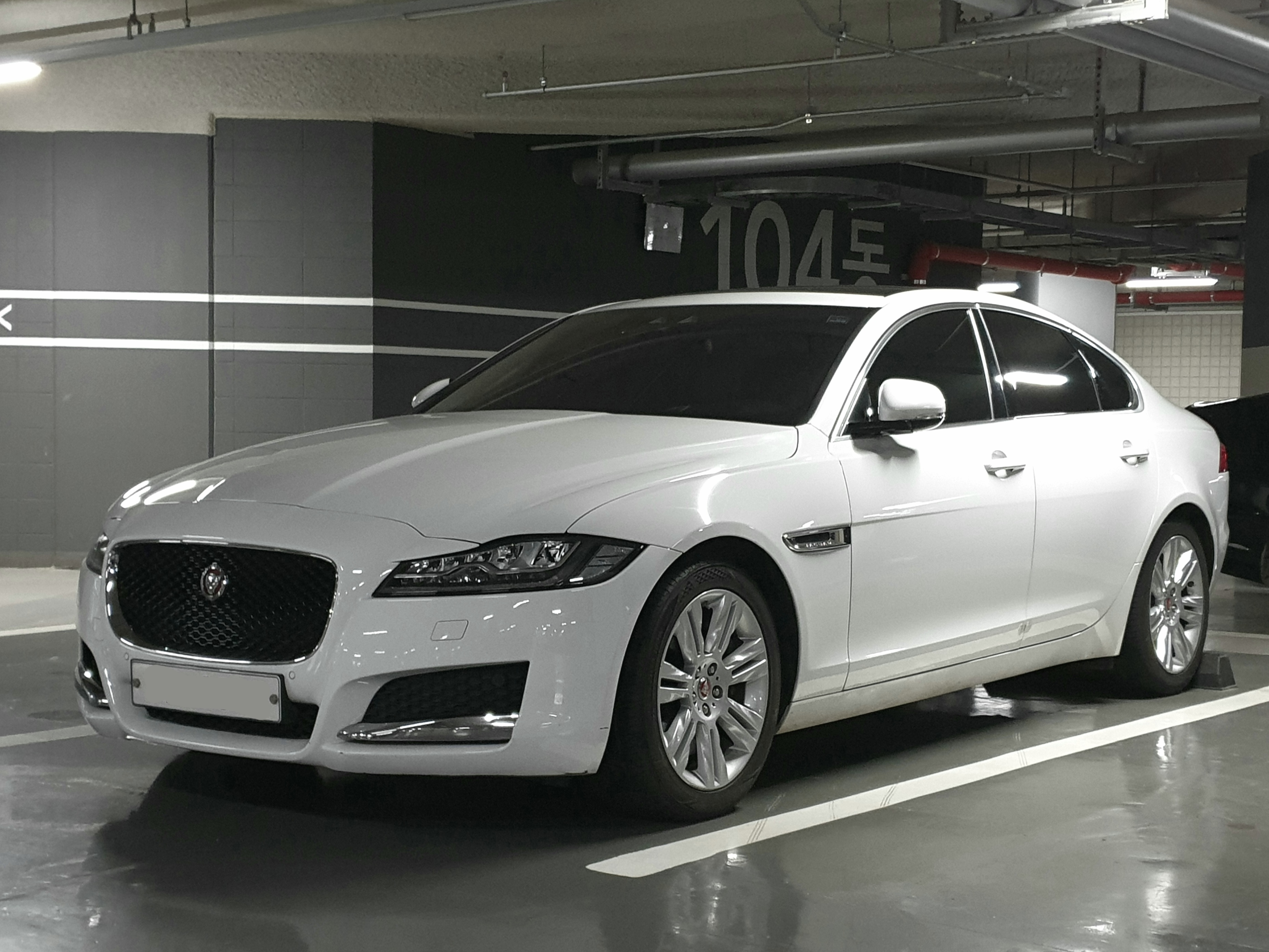
Jaguar XF (X260) 2015–2024

The Jaguar XF is a mid-size executive car introduced in 2008 to replace the S-Type. In January 2008, the XF was awarded the What Car? 'Car of the Year' and 'Executive Car of the Year' awards. The XF was also awarded Car of the Year 2008 from What Diesel? magazine. Engines available in the XF are 2.2-litre I4 and 3.0-litre V6 diesel engines, or 3.0 litre V6 and 5.0-litre V8 petrol engines. The 5.0 Litre engine is available in supercharged form in the XFR. From 2011, the 2.2-litre diesel engine from the Land Rover Freelander was added to the range as part of a facelift. Production of the XF ceased in mid 2024.

== R and SVR models ==
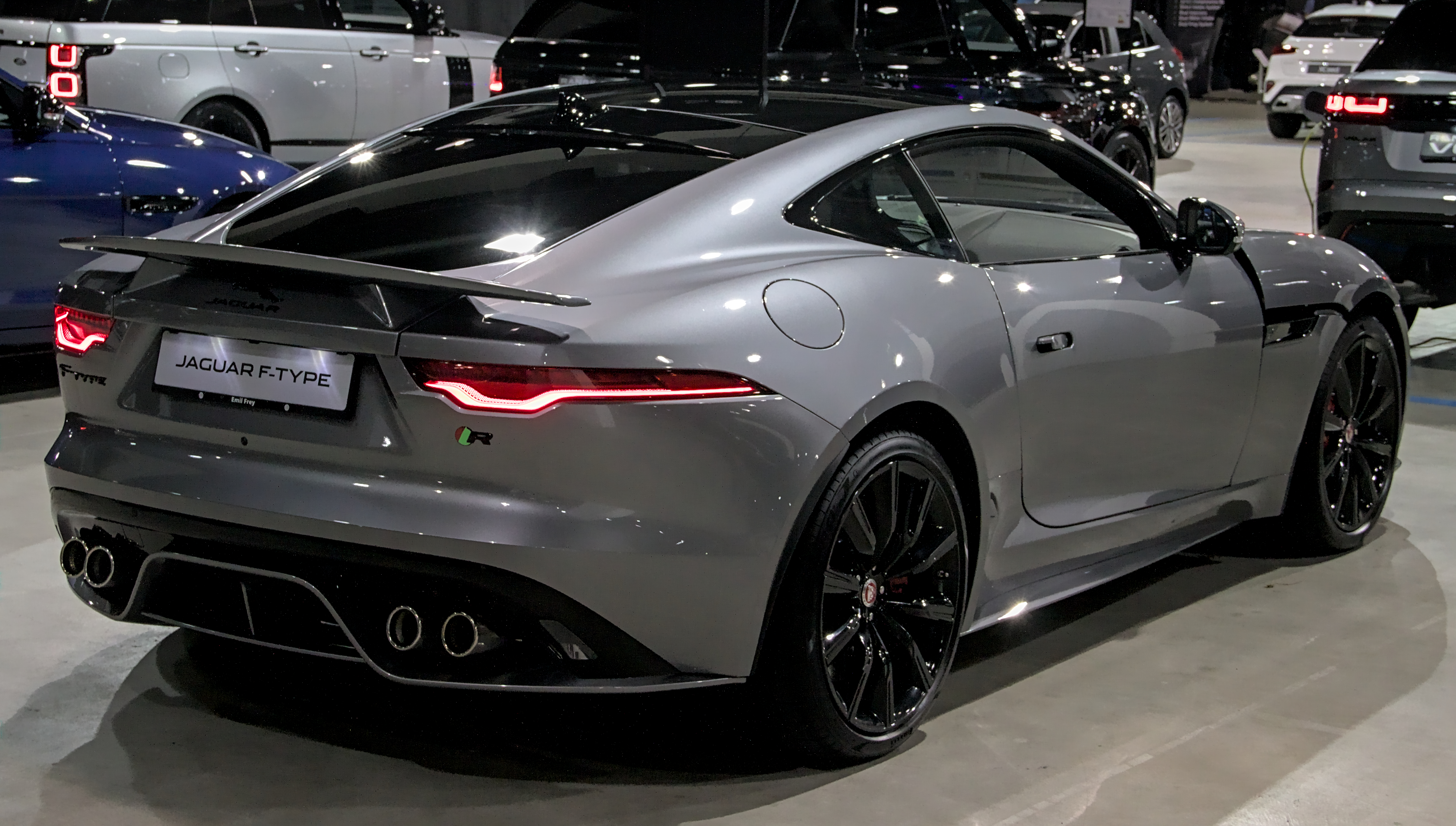
2020 Jaguar F-Type R 575 Coupe

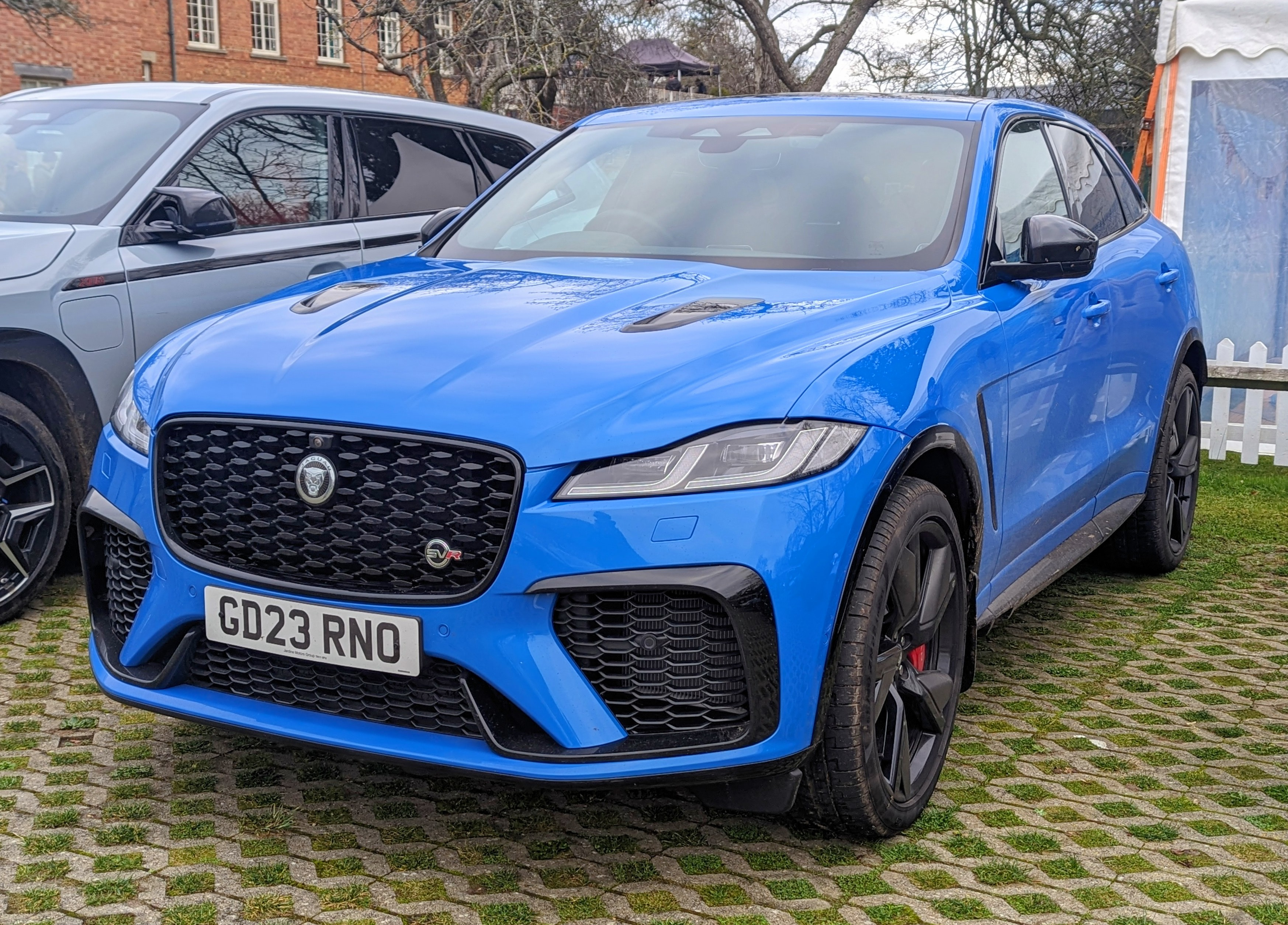
2023 Jaguar F-Pace SVR AWD

Jaguar began producing R models in 1995 with the introduction of the first XJR, and the first XKR was introduced in 1997. Jaguar R, R-S and SVR models are designated to compete with the likes of Mercedes-AMG, BMW M and Audi S and RS.

== Historic car models ==
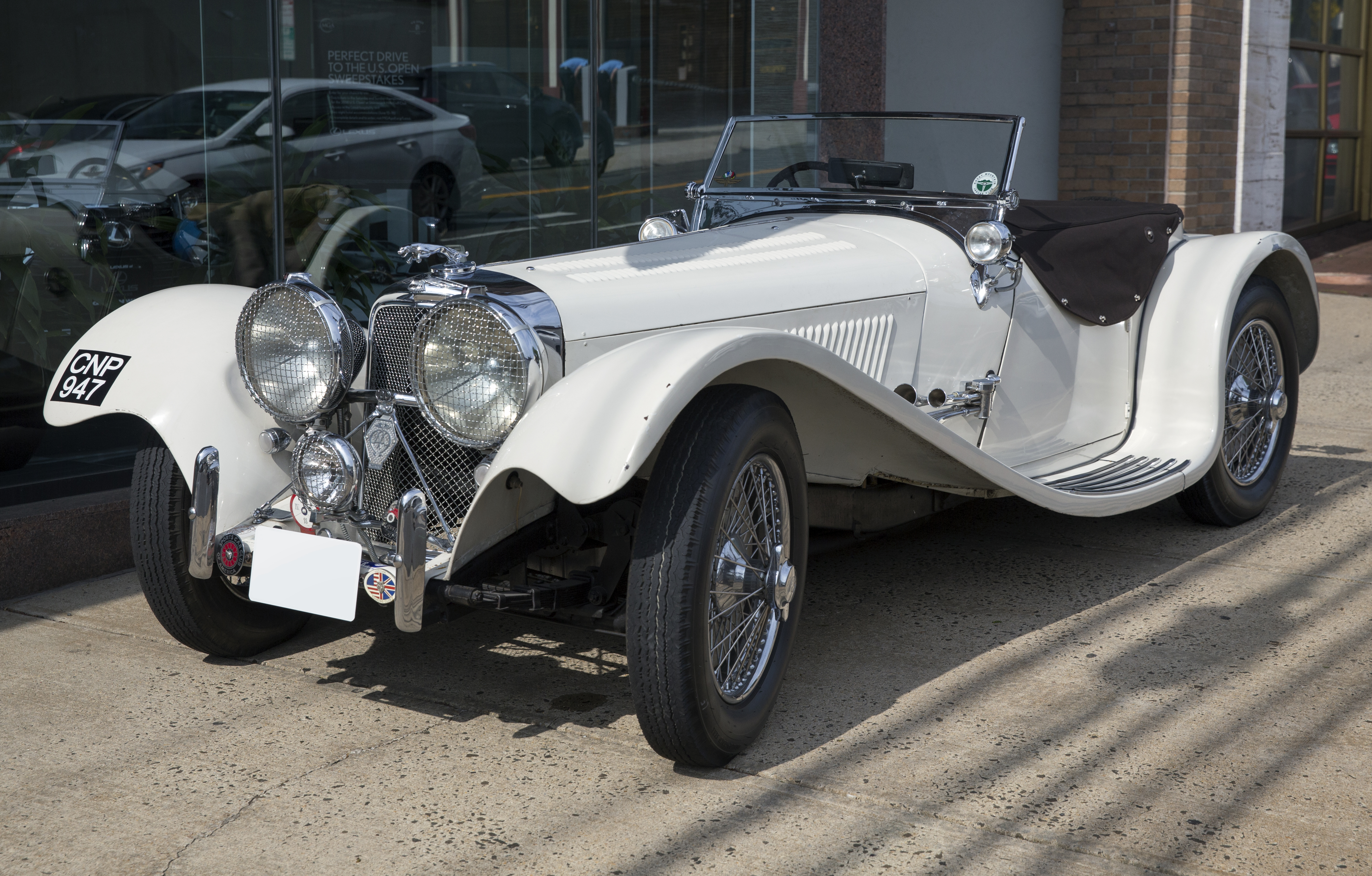
1938 SS Jaguar 100 3.5-Litre, between 1935 and 1945 the brand was known as SS Jaguar

The company changed its name from SS Cars to Jaguar Cars in 1945, but between 1935 and 1945 the cars had the marque ‘SS Jaguar’ on them. During this period they produced the SS90 and the SS100. From 1945 the renamed Jaguar company started production of the pre-war 1.5, 2.5 and 3.5-litre models, which used engines designed by the Standard Motor Company. The 1.5-litre four-cylinder engine was still supplied by Standard but the two larger six-cylinder ones were made in house. These cars have become known unofficially as Mark IVs.

The first post-war model was the September 1948 Mark V available with either 2.5 or 3.5-litre engines. It had a slightly more streamlined appearance than pre-war models, but more important was the change to torsion bar independent front suspension and hydraulic brakes. In the spring of 1948 Lyons had returned from USA reporting Jaguar's individuality and perceived quality attracted the admiration of American buyers accustomed to the virtual uniformity of their home-grown vehicles.

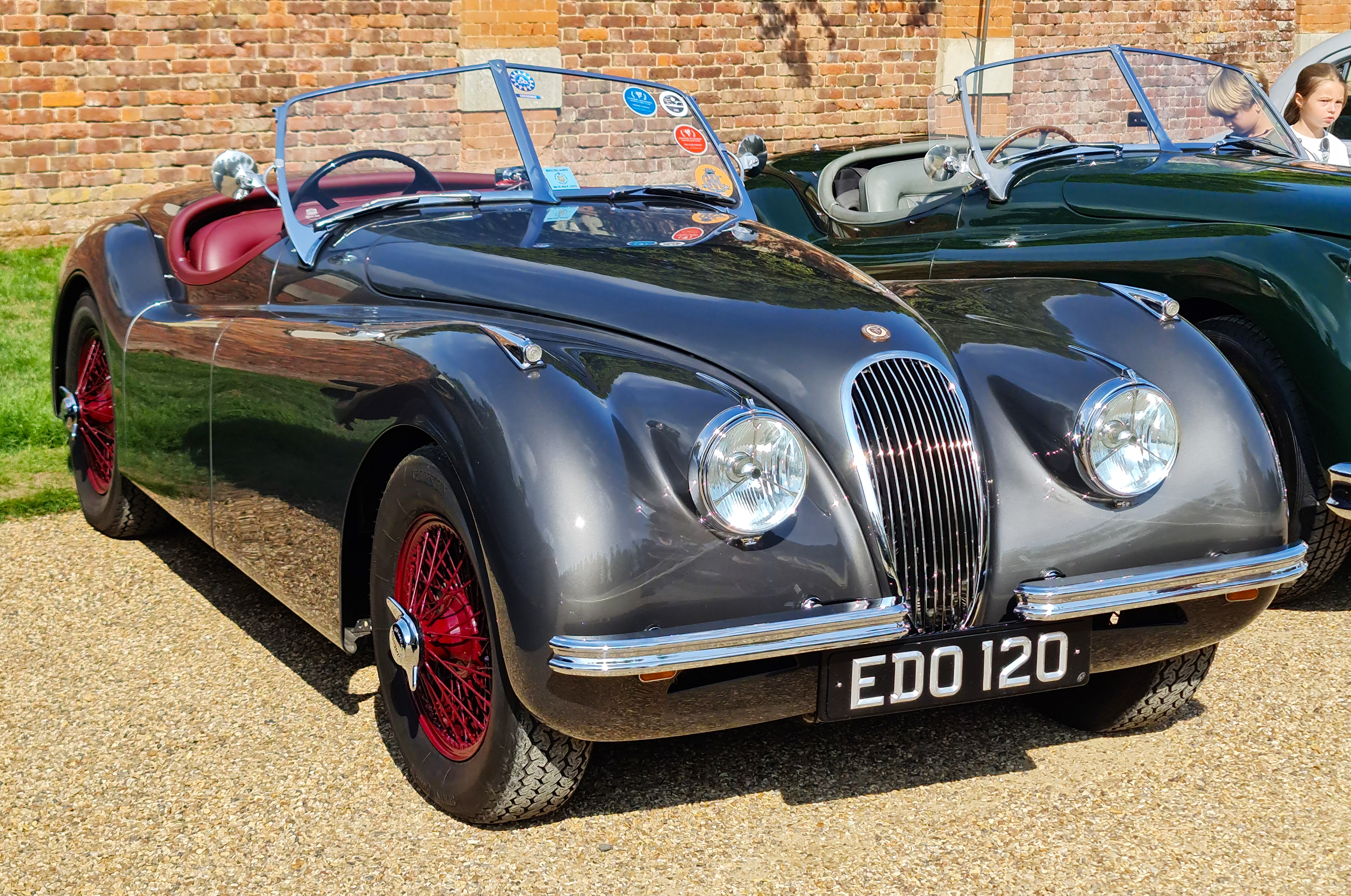
The 1948 XK120 was a breakthrough both for Jaguar and post-WWII sports cars.

The first big breakthrough was the launch in October 1948 of their new record-breaking engine design in their XK120 sportscar to replace the prewar SS Jaguar 100. It was powered by a new twin overhead camshaft (DOHC) 3.5-litre hemi-head six-cylinder engine designed by William Heynes, Walter Hassan and Claude Baily. The XK100 4-cylinder 2-Litre version had broken records in Belgium travelling at 177 mph. This XK engine had been designed at night during the war when they would be on fire watch in the factory. After several attempts a final design was achieved. That is until owner William Lyons said "make it quieter".

The sportscar bearing its prefix X had originally been intended as a short production model of about 200 vehicles. A test bed for the new engine until its intended home, the new Mark VII saloon, was ready.

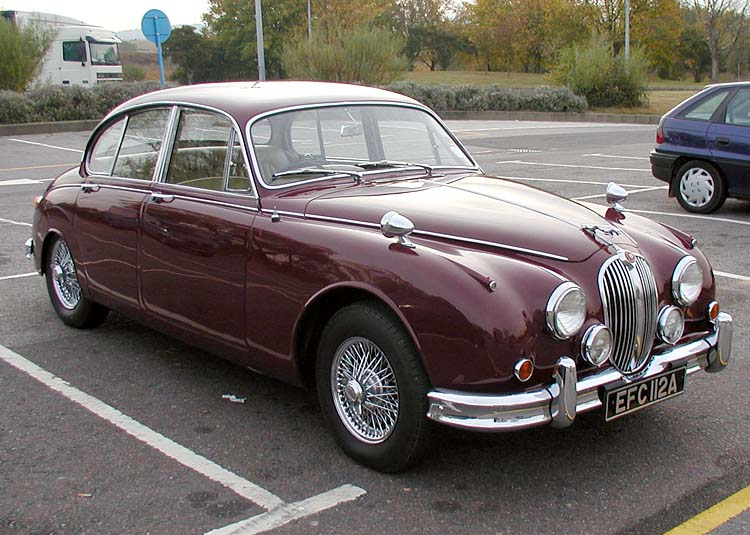
1960s Mark 2 became one of the most recognisable Jaguar models ever produced.

The second big breakthrough was the large Mark VII saloon in 1950, a car especially conceived for the American market, Jaguar was overwhelmed with orders. The Mark VII and its successors gathered rave reviews from magazines such as Road & Track and The Motor. In 1956 a Mark VII won the prestigious Monte Carlo Rally. The XK120's exceptional reception was followed in 1954 by an improved XK140 then in May 1957 a fully revised XK150.

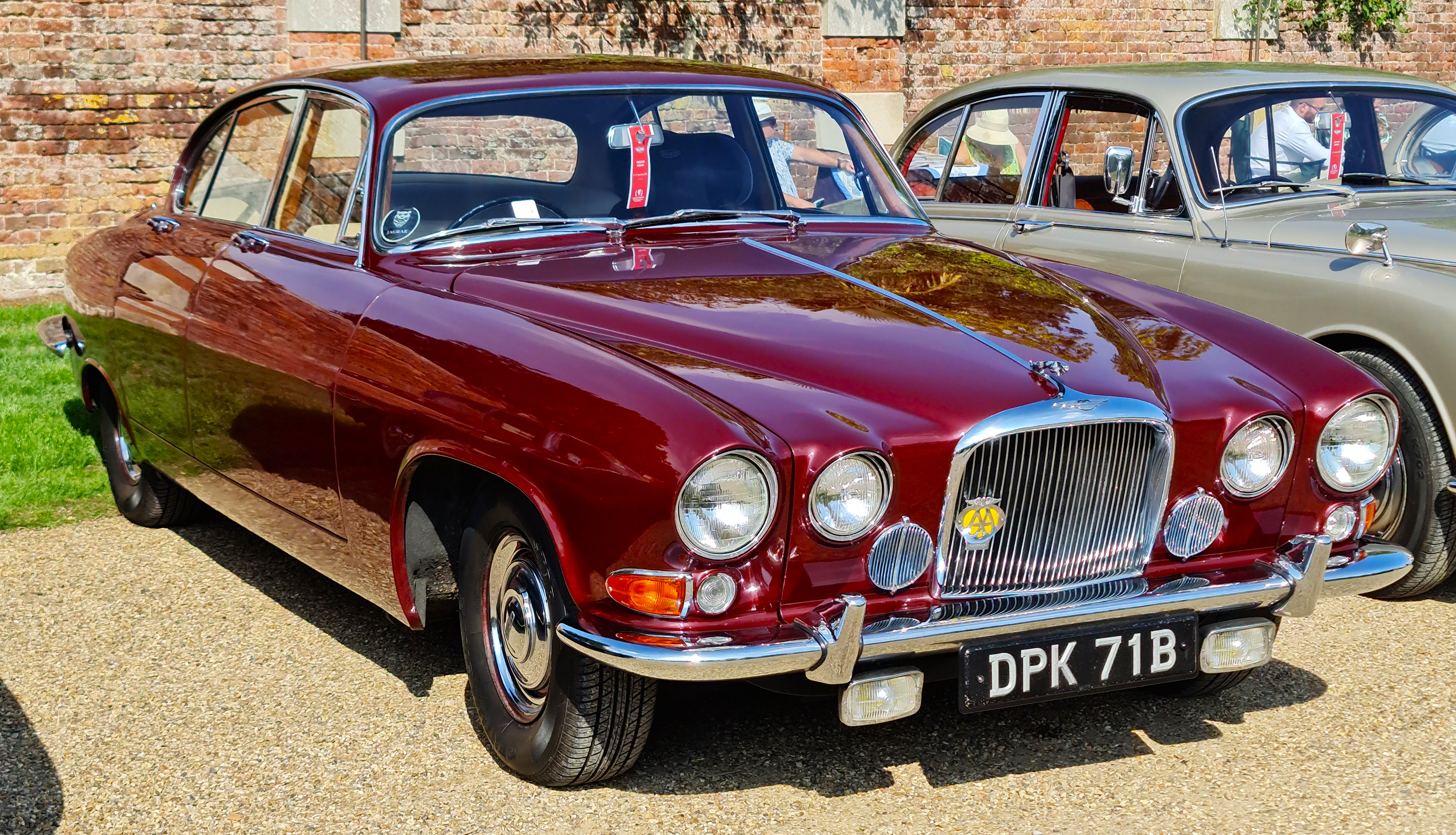
The Mark X later renamed the Jaguar 420G, was the basis for the later XJ6

In 1955, the Two-point-four or 2.4-litre saloon (named by enthusiasts 2.4 Mark 1) was the first monocoque (unitary) car from Jaguar. Its 2.4-litre short-stroke version of the XK engine provided 100 mph (160 km/h) performance. In 1957, the 3.4-litre version with disk brakes, wire wheels and other options was introduced, with a top speed of 120 mph (190 km/h). In October 1959, an extensively revised version of the car with wider windows and 2.4, 3.4, and 3.8-litre engine options became the Mark 2. The 3.8 Mark 2 was popular with British police forces for its small size and 125 mph (201 km/h) performance.

The Mark VIII of 1956 and Mark IX of 1958 were essentially updates of the Mark VII, but the oversize Mark X of 1961 was a completely new design of large saloon with all round independent suspension and unitary construction. Jaguar launched the E-Type in 1961.

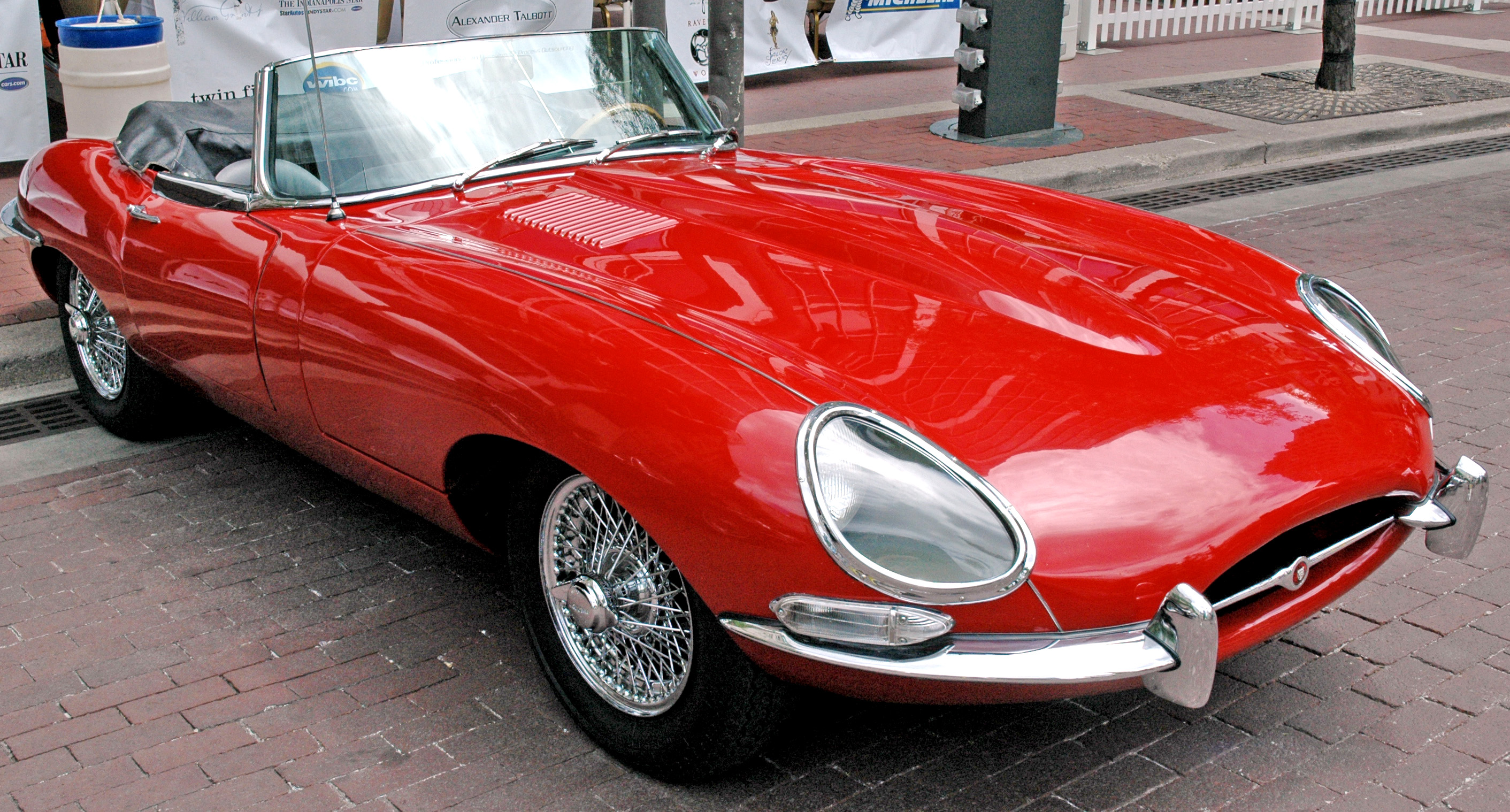
1963 open two-seat E-Type

The independent rear suspension from the Mark X was incorporated in the 1963 S-Type, a Mark 2 lengthened to contain the complex rear suspension, and in 1967 the Mark 2 name was dropped when the small saloons became the 240/340 range. The 420 of 1966, also sold as the Daimler Sovereign, put a new front onto the S-type, although both cars continued in parallel until the S-Type was dropped in 1968. The slow-selling Mark X became the 420G in 1966 and was dropped at the end of the decade. Jaguar was saved by its new equally capacious but very much trimmer new XJ6.

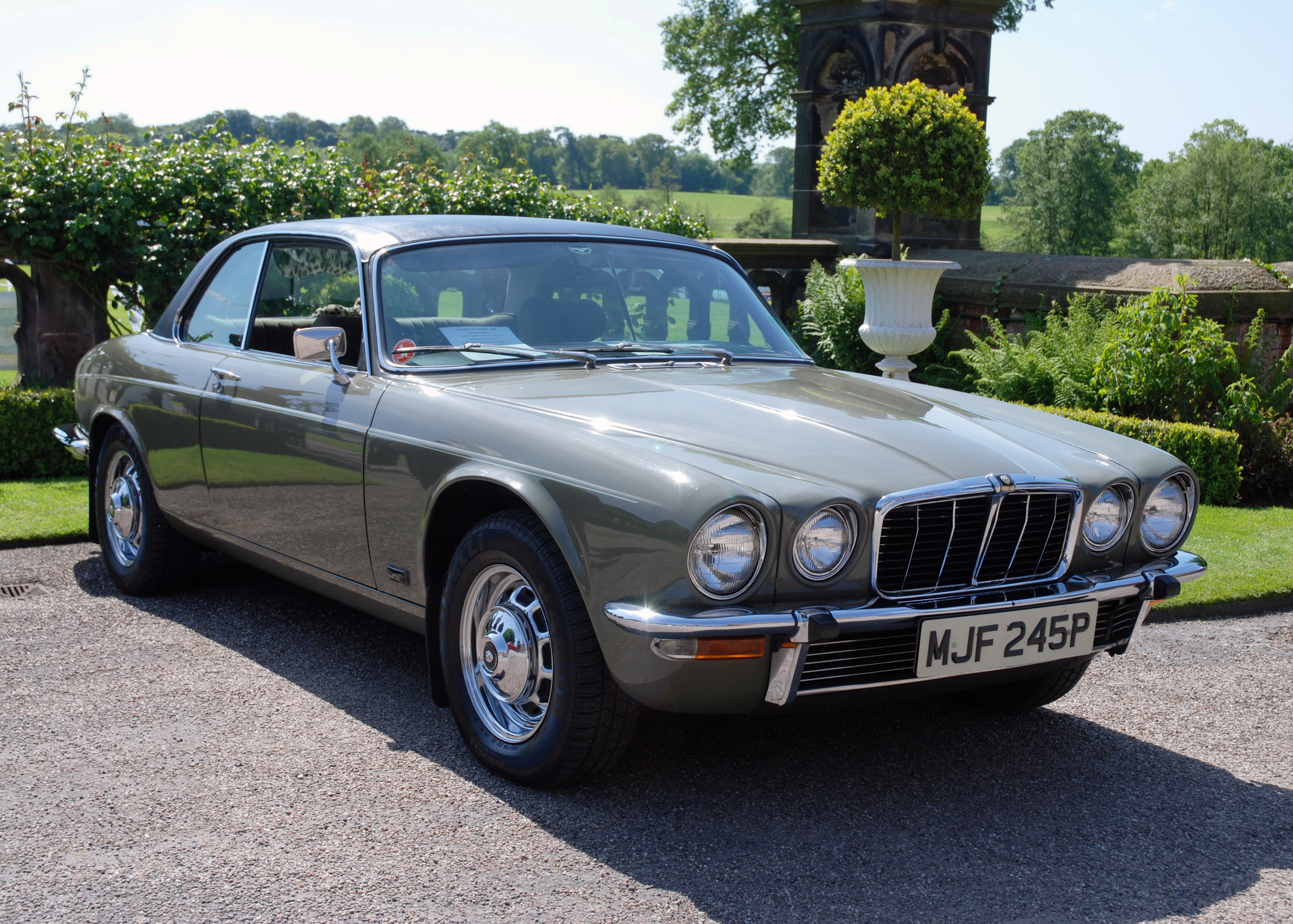
XJ-C coupe based on the XJ6

Of the more recent saloons, the most significant is the XJ (1968–1992). From 1968 on, the Series I XJ saw minor changes, first in 1973 (to Series II), 1979 (Series III), a complete redesign for 1986/1987 in XJ40, further modifications in 1995 (X300), in 1997 with V8-power (X308), and a major advance in 2003 with an industry-first aluminium monocoque-chassis (X350). The most luxurious XJ models carried either the Vanden Plas (US) or Daimler (rest of world) nameplates. In 1972, the 12-cylinder engine was introduced in the XJ, while simultaneously being offered in the E Type. There was a production run of two-door XJ coupés with a pillarless hardtop body called the XJ-C which was built between 1975 and 1977, in addition to about 2,000 Daimler-badged examples.

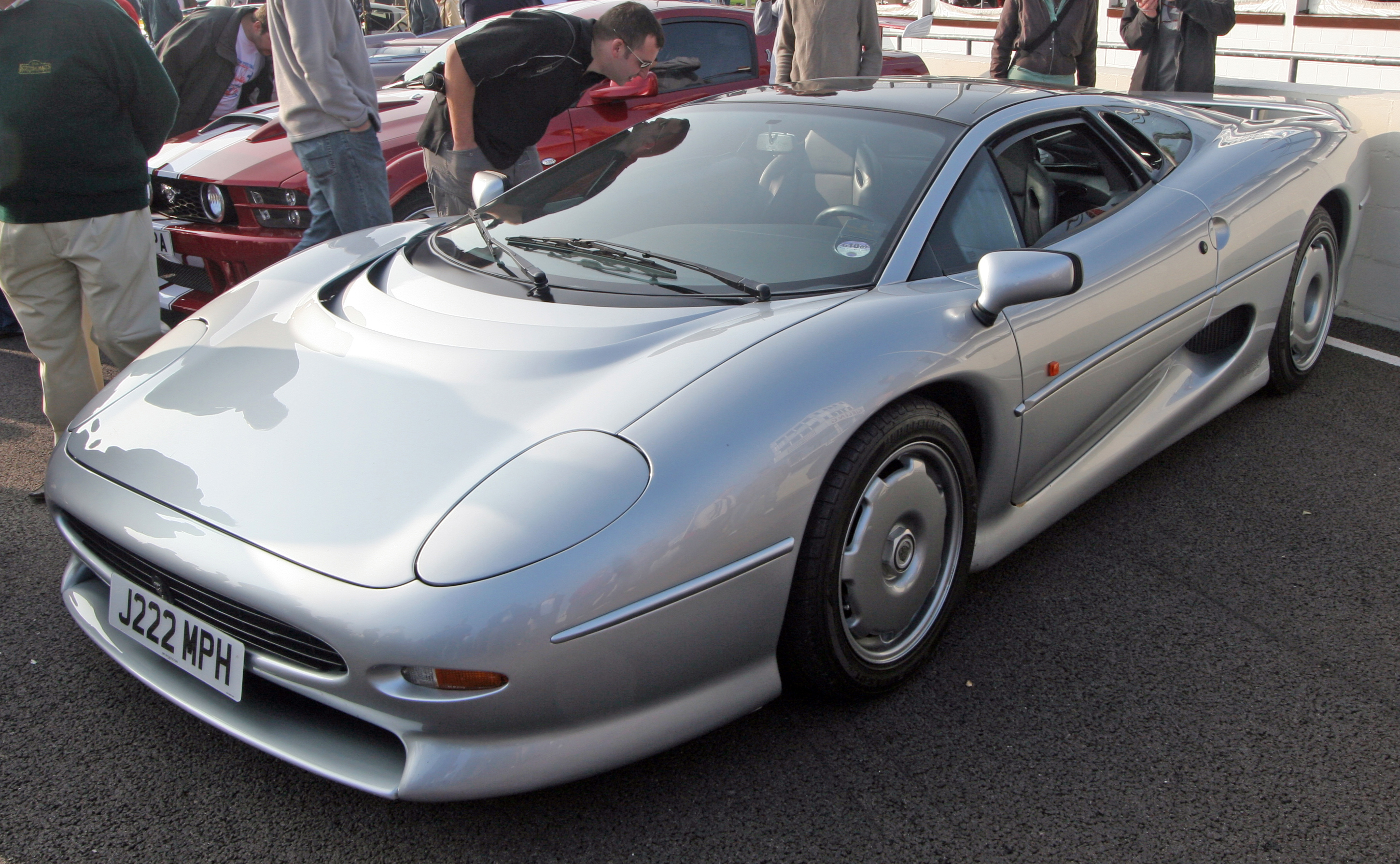
The XJ220—the world's fastest production car in 1992

1992 saw the introduction of the mid-engined, twin-turbo XJ220, powered by a 542 bhp (404 kW; 550 PS) V6 engine. The XJ220 was confirmed the fastest production car in the world at the time after Martin Brundle recorded a speed of 217 mph (349 km/h) on the Nardo track in Italy.

Over the years many Jaguar models have sported the famous chrome plated Leaping Jaguar, traditionally forming part of the radiator cap. Known as "The Leaper", this iconic mascot has been the subject of controversy in recent times when banned for safety reasons from cars supplied to Europe whilst it continued to be fitted on cars destined for the United States, Middle East and Far East. It has now been dropped from all the latest Jaguar models, although some customers add it to their car as a customisation.

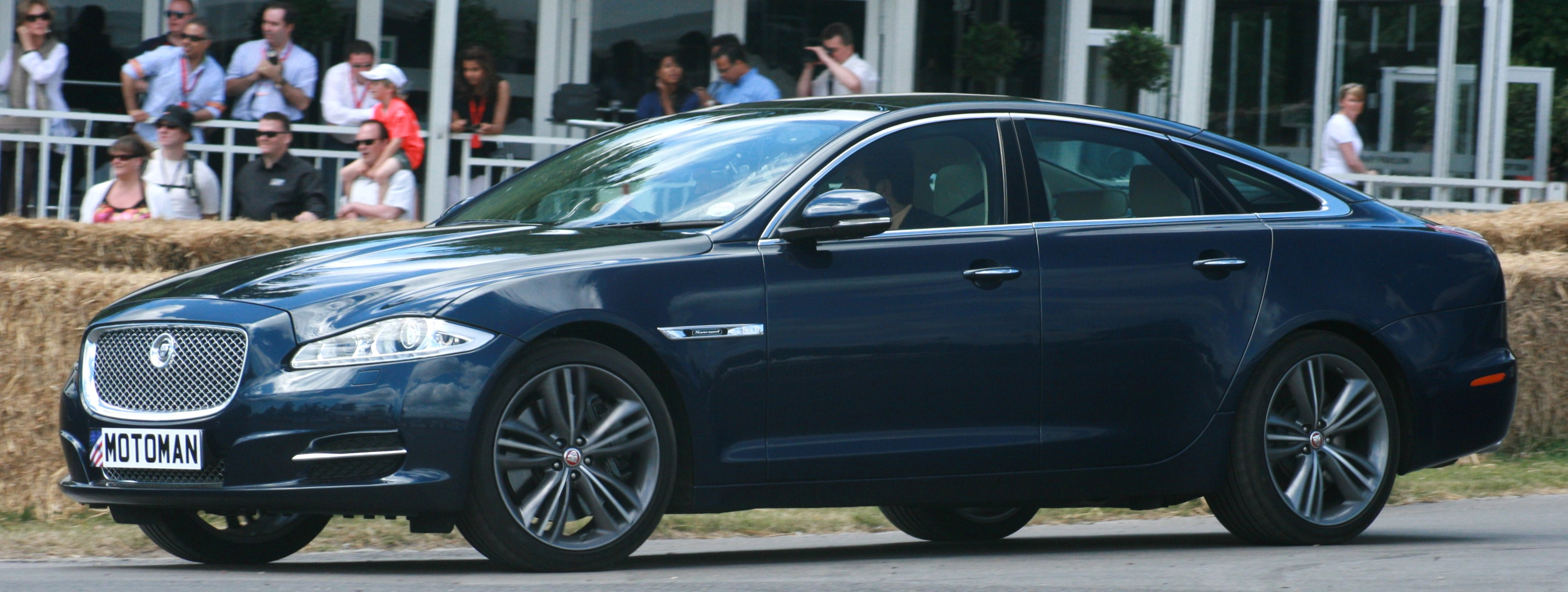
Jaguar XJ Supersport - Jaguar XJ available 2009–2019

The Jaguar S-Type, first appeared in 1999 and stopped production in 2008. It has now been replaced by the Jaguar XF. Early S-Types suffered from reliability problems but those were mostly resolved by the 2004 model year.

The Jaguar X-Type was a compact executive car launched in 2001, while the company was under Ford ownership, sharing its platform with the Ford Mondeo. X-Type production ended in 2009.

The Jaguar XK was a luxury grand tourer introduced in 2006, where it replaced the XK8. The XK introduced an aluminium monocoque bodyshell, and was available both as a two-door coupé and two-door cabriolet/convertible. Production ceased in 2014.

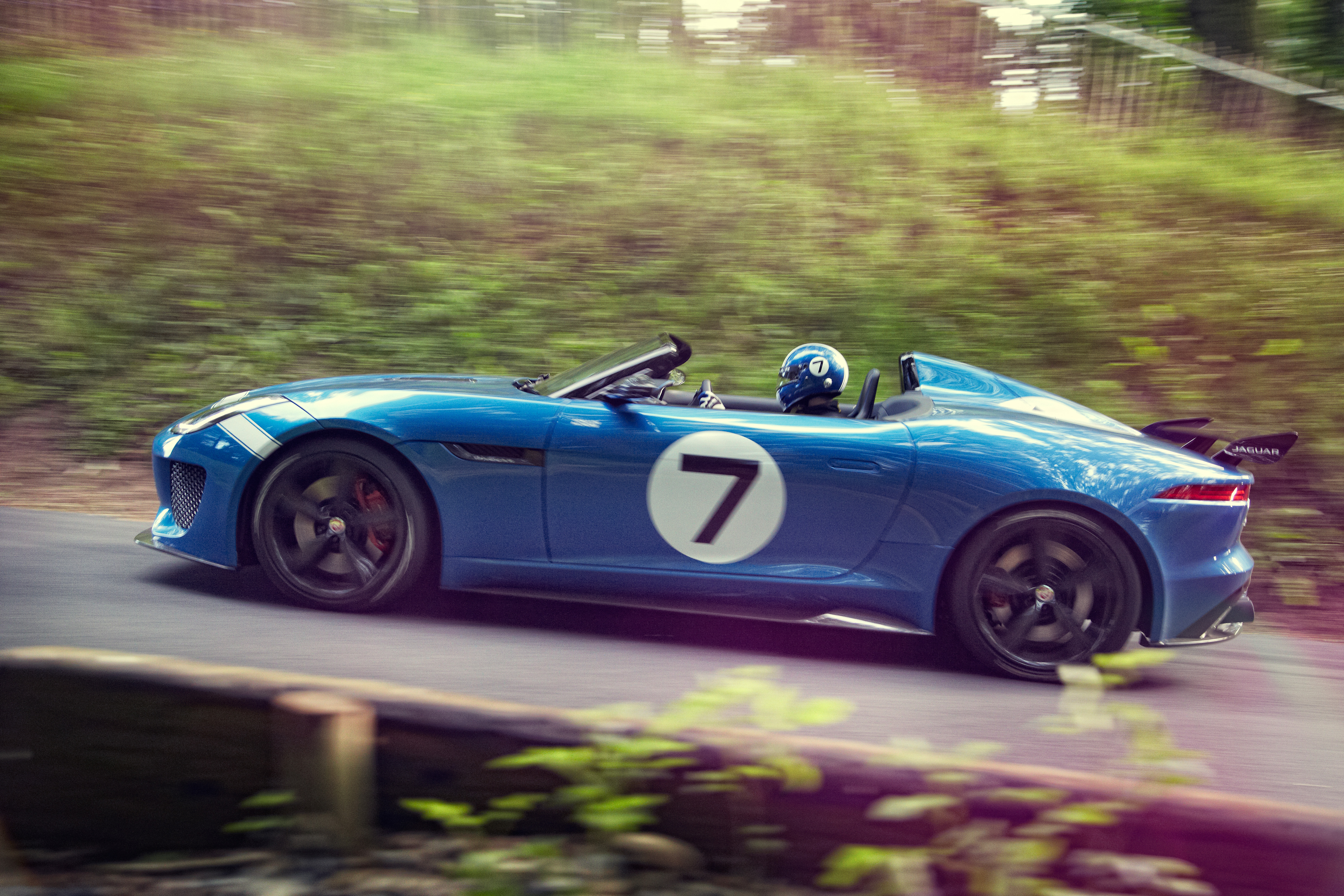
Project 7, a limited edition sports car based on the F-Type

The Jaguar XJ was a full-size luxury saloon. The model was in production since 1968, with production ceasing in 2019, with the first generation being the last Jaguar car to have creative input by the company's founder, Sir William Lyons, although this is disputed as some Jaguar historians claim that the second generation XJ – the XJ40 series – was the last car which Lyons had influenced. The XJ40 originally launched in 1986 and went through two major revamps in 1994 (X300) and 1997 (X308) for a total production run of 17 years.

In early 2003, the third generation XJ – the X350 – arrived in showrooms and while the car's exterior and interior styling were traditional in appearance, the car was completely re-engineered. Its styling attracted much criticism from many motoring journalists who claimed that the car looked old-fashioned and barely more modern than its predecessor, many even citing that the 'Lyons line' had been lost in the translation from XJ40 into X350 XJ, even though beneath the shell lay a highly advanced aluminium construction that put the XJ very near the top of its class.

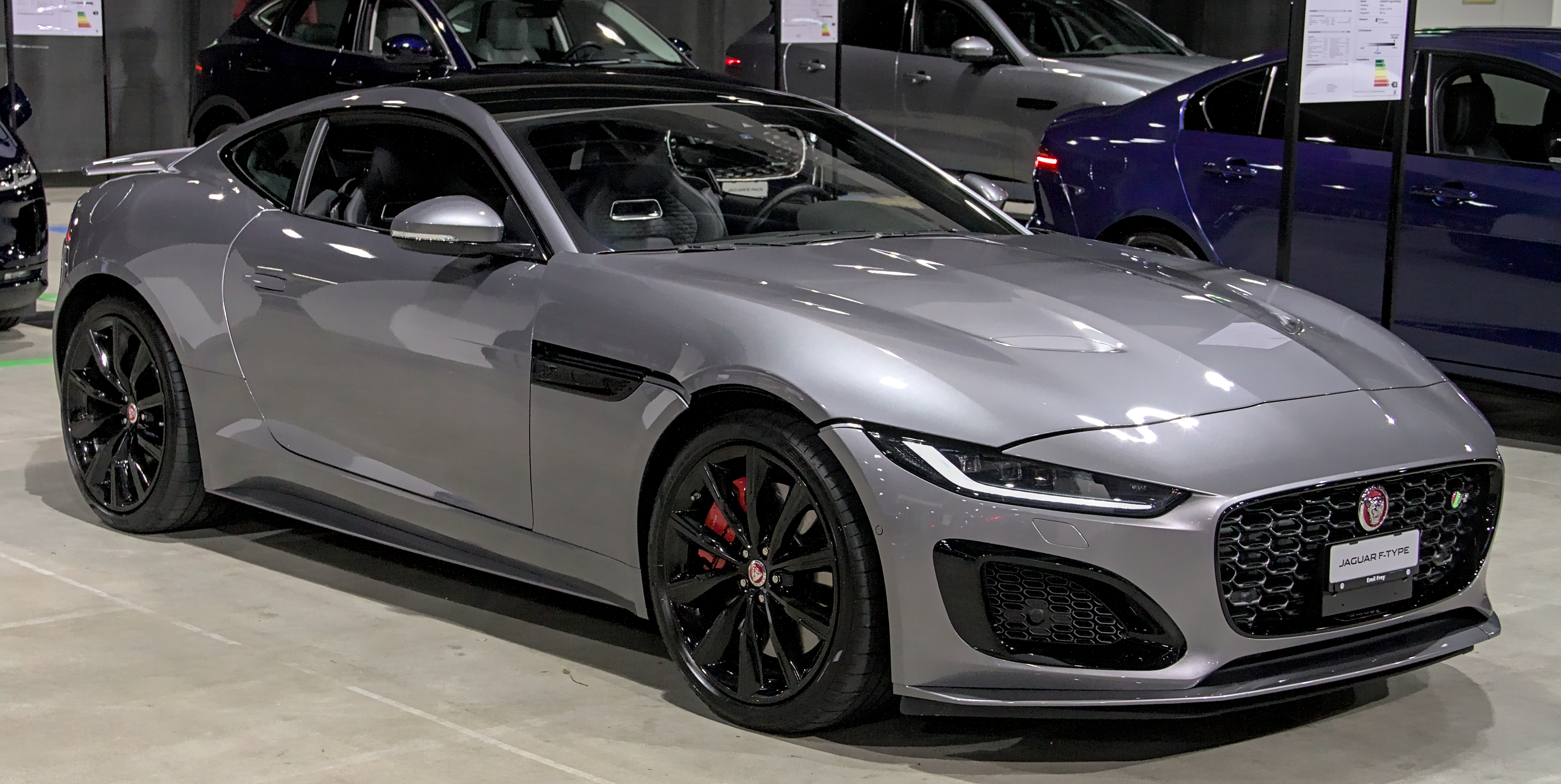
Jaguar F-Type R 575 coupe

Jaguar responded to the criticism with the introduction of the fourth generation XJ, launched in 2009. Its exterior styling is a departure from previous XJs, with a more youthful, contemporary stance, following the design shift that came into effect previously with the company's XF and XK models. The 5-litre V8 engine in the XJ Supersport can accelerate the car from 0 to 60 mph (0–97 km/h) in 4.7 seconds, and has a UK CO_{2} emission rating of 289 g/km. To cater to the limousine market, all XJ models are offered with a longer wheelbase (LWB) as an option, which increases the rear legroom.

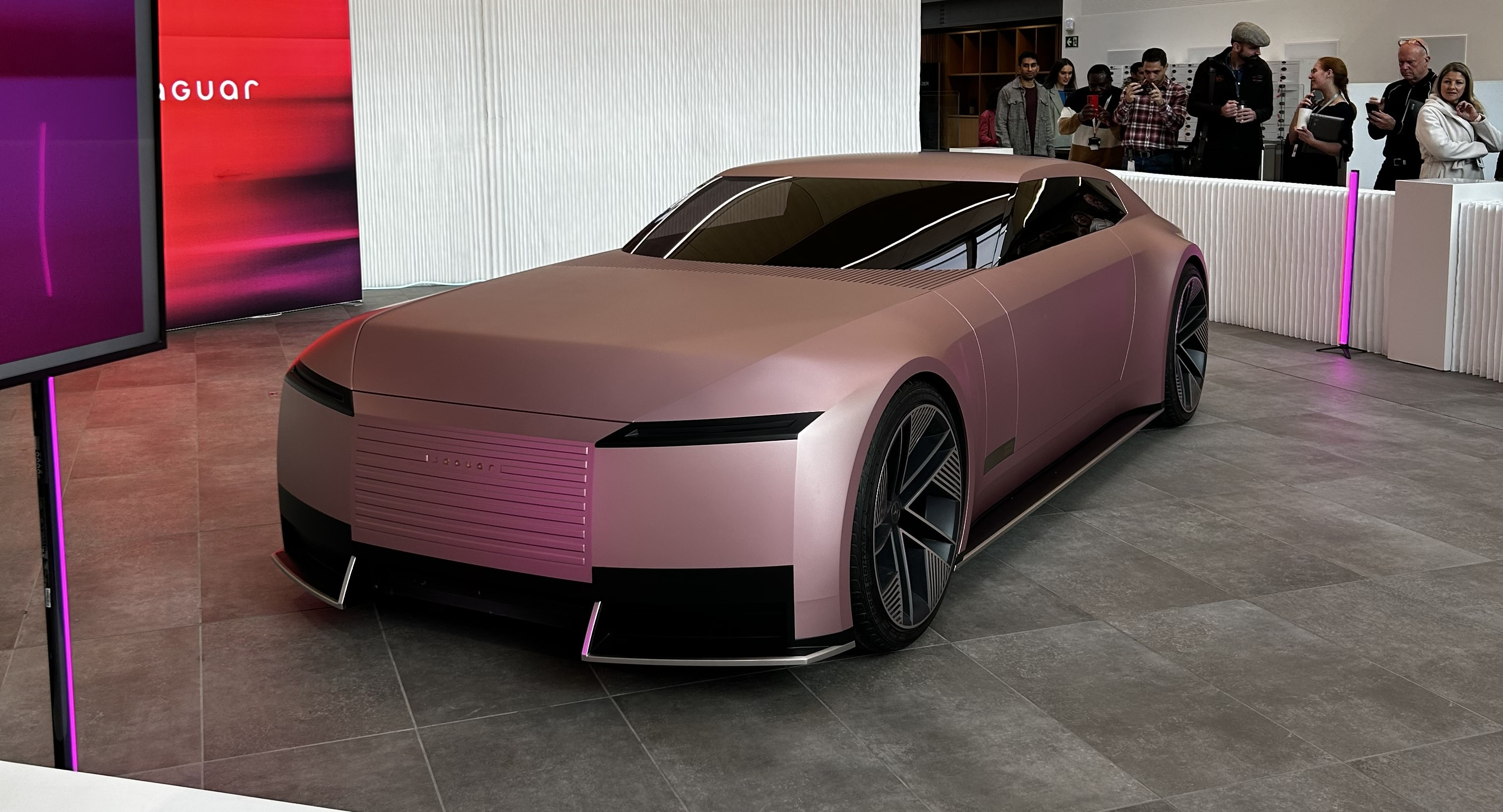
The Jaguar Type 00 from the front, on display at the Gaydon headquarters.

In 2024, Jaguar relaunched its brand with a new logo, motto and concept car. The revealed "Jaguar Type 00" at the Miami Art Show was controversial on both online reactions and wider media coverage. The Jaguar Type 00 name (spoken as "zero-zero") draws inspiration from the iconic Jaguar Type series of the past, particularly the renowned E-Type, as well as other premium cars such as those from Bentley and Rolls Royce. The first "zero" represents the car's zero-emissions electric powertrain, while the second "zero" is supposedly in reference to the beginning of an "whole new lineage of Jaguars". While only a concept car, it is the first Jaguar car to display the new logo and badge, and the company has stated that it is a representation the direction the company will go with its future design style.

=== List ===
==== Large executive ====
- 1935–1955 2 1/2 litre saloon
- 1937–1948 3 1/2 Litre saloon
- 1948–1951 Mark V
- 1951–1957 Mark VII (& VIIM)
- 1957–1959 Mark VIII
- 1959–1961 Mark IX
- 1961–1966 Mark X
- 1966–1970 420G
- 1968–1987 XJ6 Series 1, 2 & 3
- 1972–1992 XJ12
- 1986–1994 XJ6 (XJ40)
- 1993–1994 XJ12 (XJ81)
- 1995–1997 XJ6 & XJ12 (X300 & X301)
- 1998–2003 XJ8 (X308)
- 2004–2007 XJ (X350)
- 2008–2009 XJ (X358)
- 2010–2019 XJ (X351)

==== Compact executive ====
- 1935–1949 1 1/2 Litre saloon
- 1955–1959 Mark 1
- 1959–1967 Mark 2
- 1963–1968 S-type
- 1966–1968 420
- 1966–1968 240 & 340
- 1999–2008 S-type
- 2001–2009 X-type
- 2007–2015 XF (X250)
- 2015–2024 XF (X260)
- 2015–2024 XE

==== Sports ====
- 1948–1954 XK120
- 1954–1957 XK140
- 1957–1961 XK150
- 1961–1974 E-Type
- 1975–1996 XJ-S
- 1992–1994 XJ220
- 1997–2006 XK8/XKR (X100)
- 2006–2014 XK (X150)
- 2014–2024 F-Type

==== Racing and competition ====
- 1950s C-Type
- 1950s D-Type
- 1960s E-Type Lightweight
- 1985–1992 XJR-5 through XJR-17
- 2009 XFR Bonneville Salt Flats speed record
- 2010 Jaguar RSR XKR GT2

=== Global Sales ===
1988 - 49.494
1992 - 20.000
1998 - 50.220
2008 - 65.000
2012 - 54.000
2013 - 77.000
2014 - 81.570
2015 - 83.986
2016 - 148.730
2017 - 178.601
2018 - 180.198
2019 - 161.601
2020 - 102.494
2021 - 86.270
2022 - 61.661
2023 - 64.241

== Concept cars ==
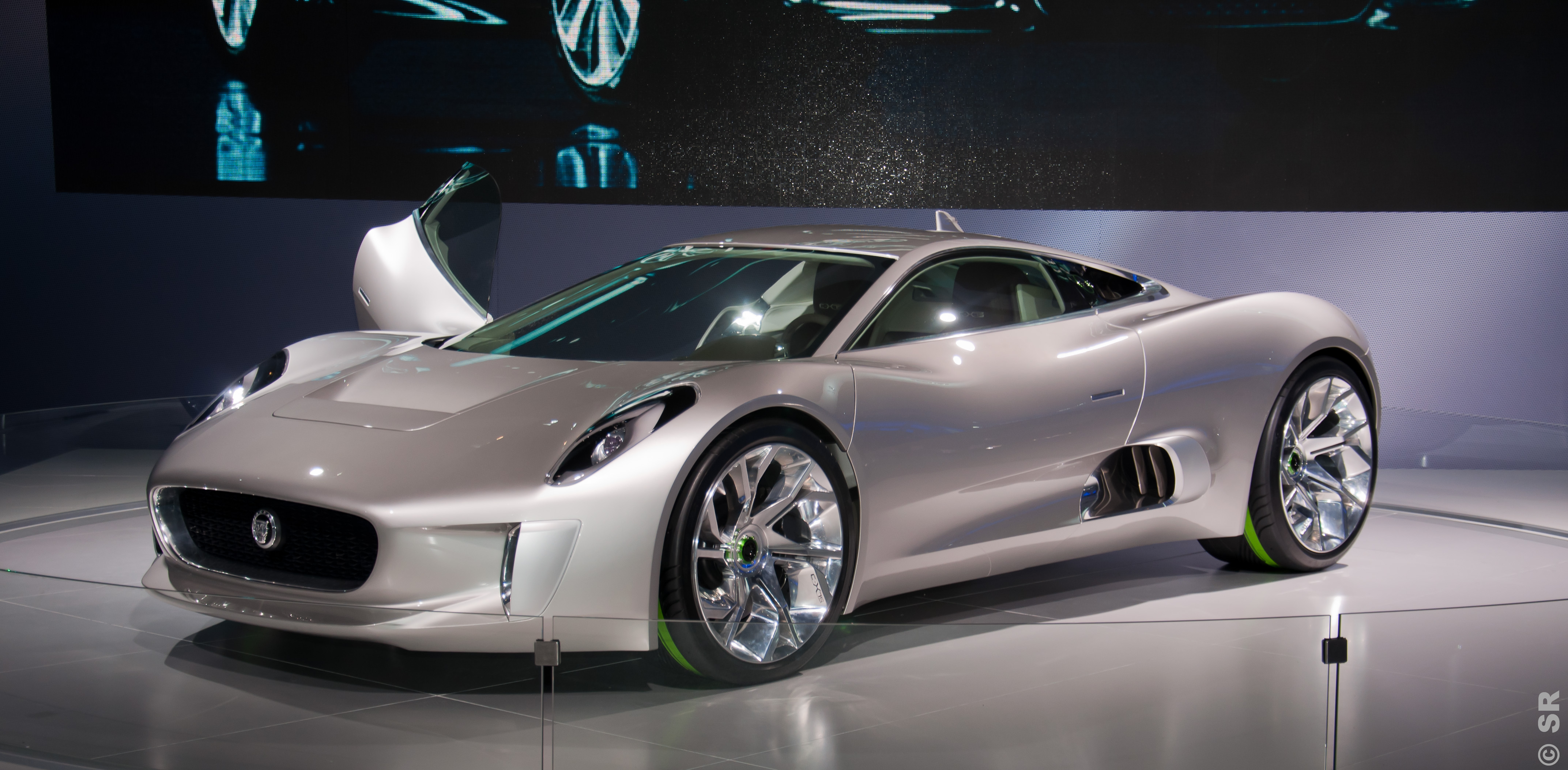
Jaguar C-X75 concept hybrid supercar produced in partnership with Williams Advanced Engineering

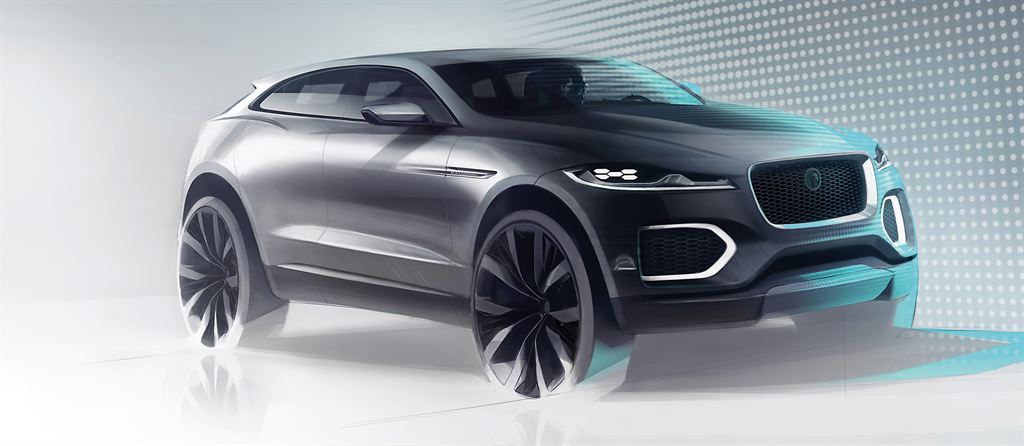
Jaguar C-X17, crossover SUV concept car

- E1A – The 1950s E-Type concept vehicle
- E2A – The second E-Type concept vehicle, which raced at LeMans and in the USA
- XJ13 (1966) – Built to race at LeMans, never run
- Pirana (1967) – Designed by Bertone
- Ascot (1977)
- XJ41/XJ42 (1982-1990) – the first F-Type; cancelled due to the Ford's takeover of Jaguar
- XJ90 (1988-1991) – planned XJ40 replacement; cancelled due to Ford's takeover of Jaguar
- Kensington (1990)
- XK 180 (1998) – Roadster concept based on the XK8
- F-Type (2000) – Roadster, similar to the XK8 but smaller
- R-Coupé (2001) – Large four-seater coupé
- Fuore XF 10 (2003)
- R-D6 (2003) – Compact four-seat coupé
- XKR-R (2001) – A high-performance version of the first generation XK coupé
- XK-RS (2004) – Another performance-spec version of the first generation XK convertible
- Concept Eight (2004) – Super-luxury version of the long-wheelbase model of the XJ
- Advanced Lightweight Coupe Concept (2005) – Previewed the second generation Jaguar XK
- C-XF (2007) – Precursor to the production model XF saloon
- C-X75 (2010) – Hybrid-electric sports car, originally intended for production but cancelled in 2012
- B99 (2011)
- C-X16 (2011) – Precursor to the production model F-Type
- C-X17 (2013) – First ever Jaguar SUV concept
- Project 7 – a 542 bhp V8-powered speedster based on the F-Type and inspired by the D-Type (2013)
- Future-Type (2017)
- Jaguar Vision Gran Turismo SV is a concept car produced by Jaguar as part of the Vision Gran Turismo project series in 2020. It was featured as a playable car in the Gran Turismo 7 video game.
- Jaguar Type 00 is a concept car introduced at Miami Art Week in December 2024, with no plans for production.

== Engines ==
Jaguar has designed in-house six generations of engines:

- Historic:
  - XK6 – L6
  - V12 – 60° V12
  - AJ6/AJ16 – 22° Inline-6
  - AJ-V6 – 60° V6 (Ford designed, Jaguar modified)
- Discontinued:
  - AJ-V8 – 90° V8
  - AJ126 – 90° V6
  - AJD-V6 – 60° V6 (Ford designed)
  - Ingenium – Inline-4

== Motorsport ==
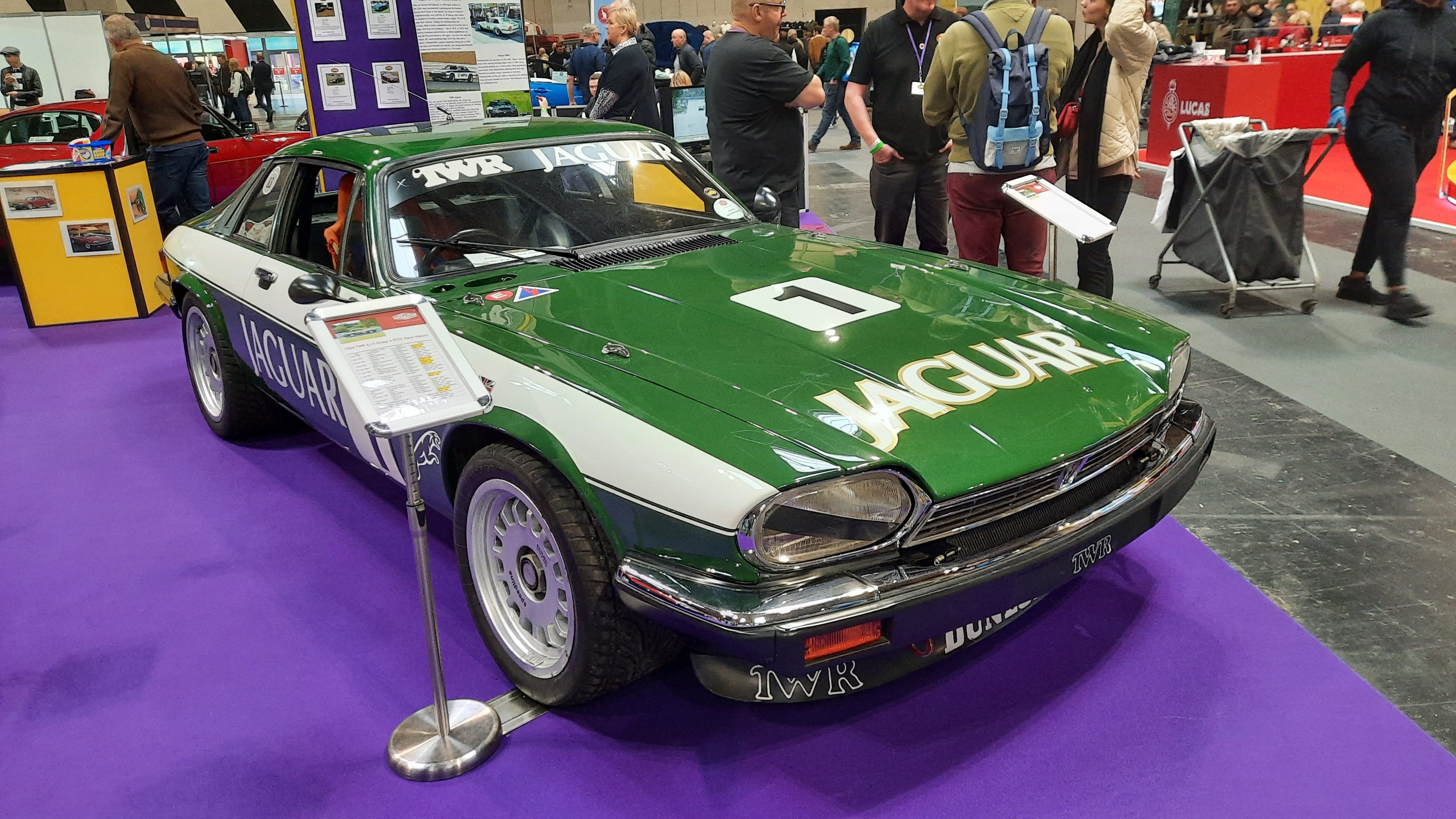
The Jaguar XJS won the 1984 European Touring Car Championship

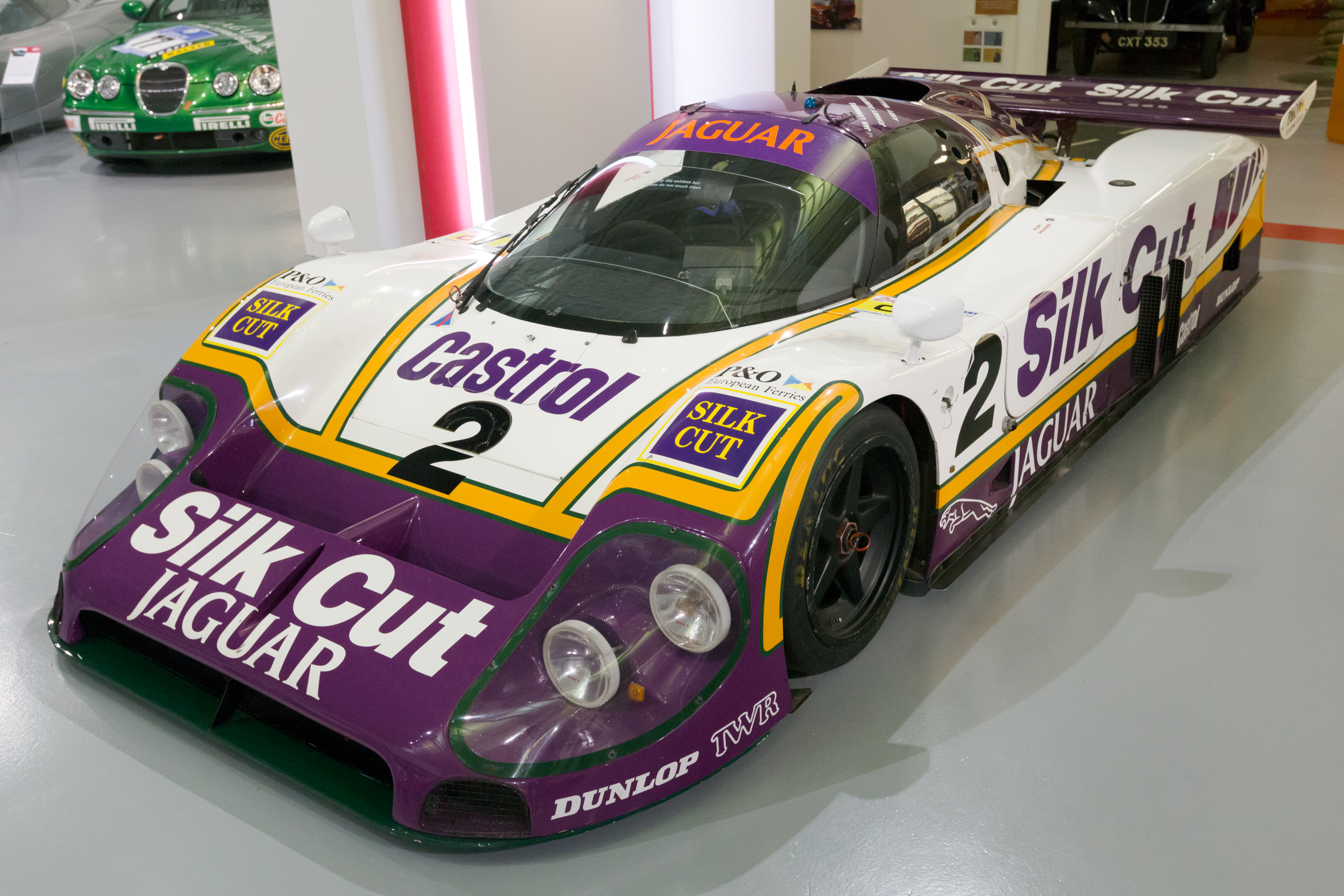
Jaguar XJR-9 - Le Mans winning car, 1988

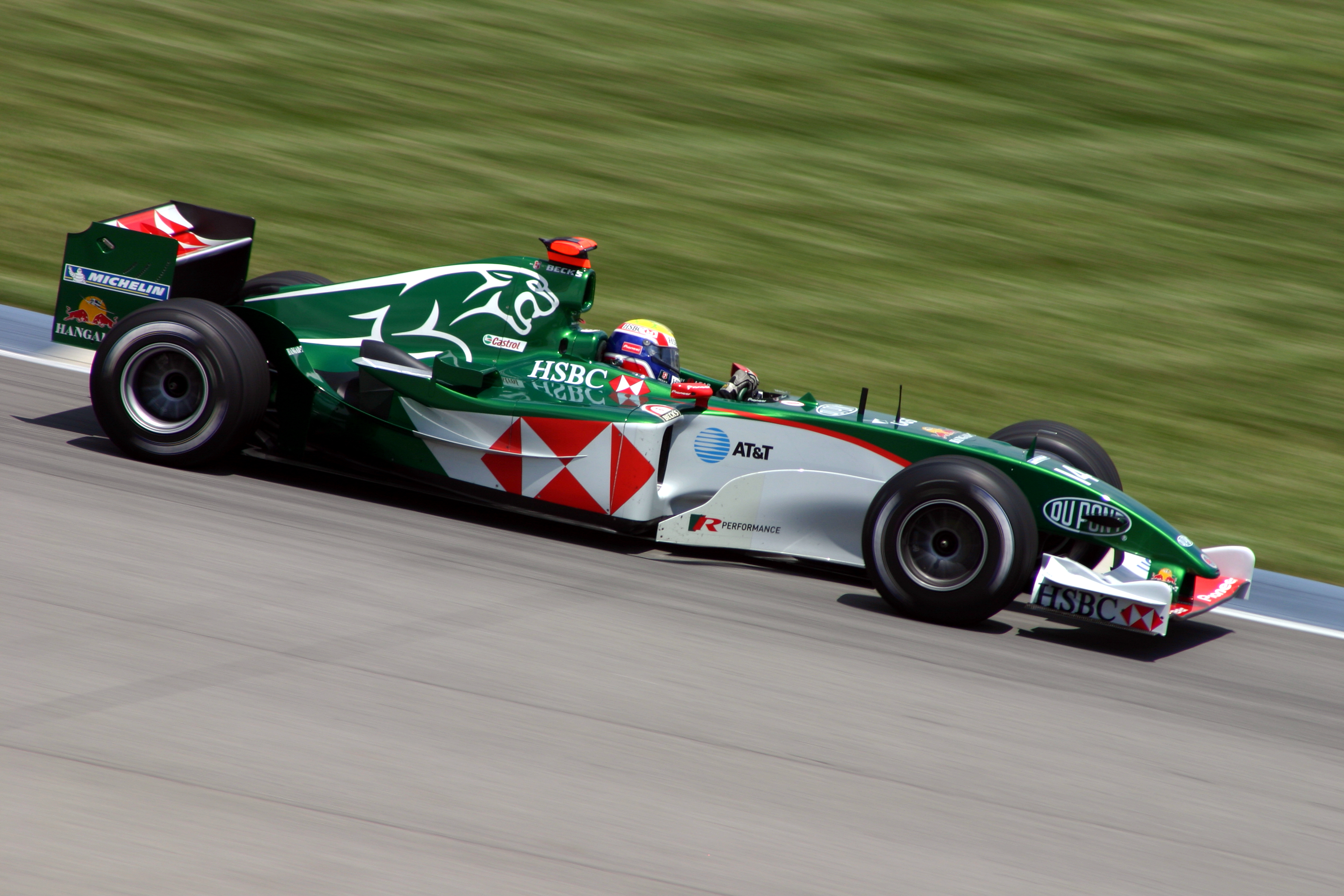
The Jaguar R5 Formula One car being driven by Mark Webber in 2004—the team's last season in F1

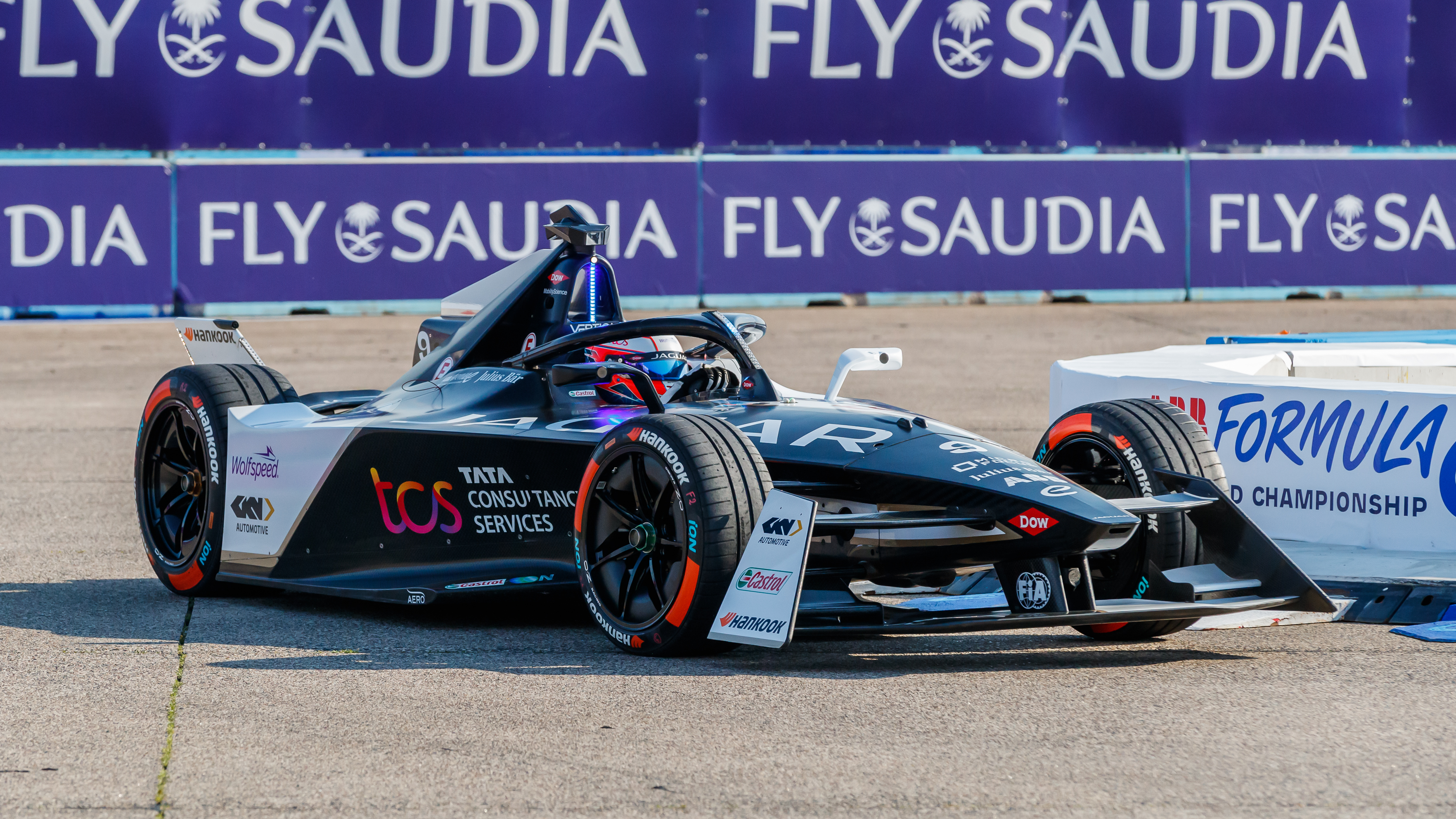
Jaguar Racing - Formula E World Championship, 2023

Jaguar has had major success in sports car racing, particularly in the Le Mans 24 Hours. Victories came in 1951 and 1953 with the C-Type, then in 1955, 1956 and 1957 with the D-Type. The manager of the racing team during this period, Lofty England, later became CEO of Jaguar in the early 1970s. Although the prototype XJ13 was built in the mid-1960s it was never raced, and the famous race was then left for many years.

In 1982, a successful relationship with Tom Walkinshaw Racing commenced with the XJ-S competing in the European Touring Car Championship, which it won in 1984. A TWR XJ-S won the 1985 Bathurst 1000. In the mid-1980s TWR started designing and preparing Jaguar V12-engined Group C cars for World Sports Prototype Championship races. The team started winning regularly from 1987, and won Le Mans in 1988 and 1990 with the XJR series sports cars. The Jaguar XJR-14 was the last of the XJRs to win, taking the 1991 World Sportscar Championship.

In 1999, Ford decided that Jaguar would be the corporation's Formula One entry. Ford bought out the Milton Keynes-based Stewart Grand Prix team and rebranded it as Jaguar Racing for the 2000 season. The Jaguar F1 program was not a success however, achieving only two podium finishes in five seasons of competition between 2000 and 2004. At the end of 2004, with costs mounting and Ford's profits dwindling, the F1 team was seen as an unneeded expense and was sold to Red Bull and rebranded Red Bull Racing.

On 15 December 2015, it was announced that Jaguar would return to motorsport for the third season of Formula E.

On 15 June 2018, Jaguar Vector Racing broke the world speed record for an electric battery powered boat. The Jaguar Vector V20E recorded an average speed of 88.61 mph across the two legs of the 1 km course on Coniston Water, England.

Jaguar has committed to Formula E until 2030. As of August 2026, Jaguar has recorded 24 wins in Formula E, two Teams' Championships and one Manufacturers' Trophy. Also the team's powertrain allowed customer outfit Envision to claim the teams' title in the 2022-23 season.

Notable sports racers:

- Jaguar C-Type (1951–1953)
- Jaguar D-Type (1954–1957)
- Jaguar Lightweight E-Type
- Jaguar XJ13
- Jaguar XJR Sportscars
- Jaguar XJR-9 (1988)
- XJ220 (1988)
- XJR-15 (1990)

== See also ==
- List of car manufacturers of the United Kingdom
