= Jaguar Land Rover Gaydon Centre =

British automotive engineering facility

The Jaguar Land Rover Gaydon Centre, which is situated north-west of the village of Gaydon, Warwickshire, England, is one of the principal engineering centres of Jaguar Land Rover and the location of the headquarters of Land Rover. The site houses a design, research and development centre and extensive test track facilities and is used for the design and development of Jaguar and Land Rover vehicles. The site, along with the smaller Aston Martin facility adjacent, occupies the land that was once the RAF V bomber base of RAF Gaydon. The British Motor Museum is also located on the same site.

== History ==
By the middle of the 1970s, the government had closed RAF Gaydon. In the late 1970s British Leyland purchased the site to convert it into a vehicle development facility and proving ground, and it became the headquarters of BL Technology (BLT). In 1980 BLT awarded a £2 million contract for the construction of a wind tunnel there.

The ownership of the site passed, along with what was by then called the Rover Group, to British Aerospace in 1988, and subsequently in 1994 to BMW.

In 2000, the site was included in the sale by BMW of the Land Rover business to Ford. Ford, which at that time also owned Jaguar Cars and Aston Martin, established the new Aston Martin headquarters and design, development and production facilities on the site, and started to use the Land Rover facilities for some Jaguar work. When Ford sold Aston Martin into private ownership in 2007, the Aston Martin facilities on the site were included in the deal, the remainder of the site continuing to be occupied by their, by then, integrated Jaguar Land Rover development operations. Jaguar Land Rover is now owned by Tata Motors.

The car park has 166 chargers for electric vehicles, at 7 kW AC each.

== See also ==
- Whitley plant
