= Jaguar Type 00 =

Concept car

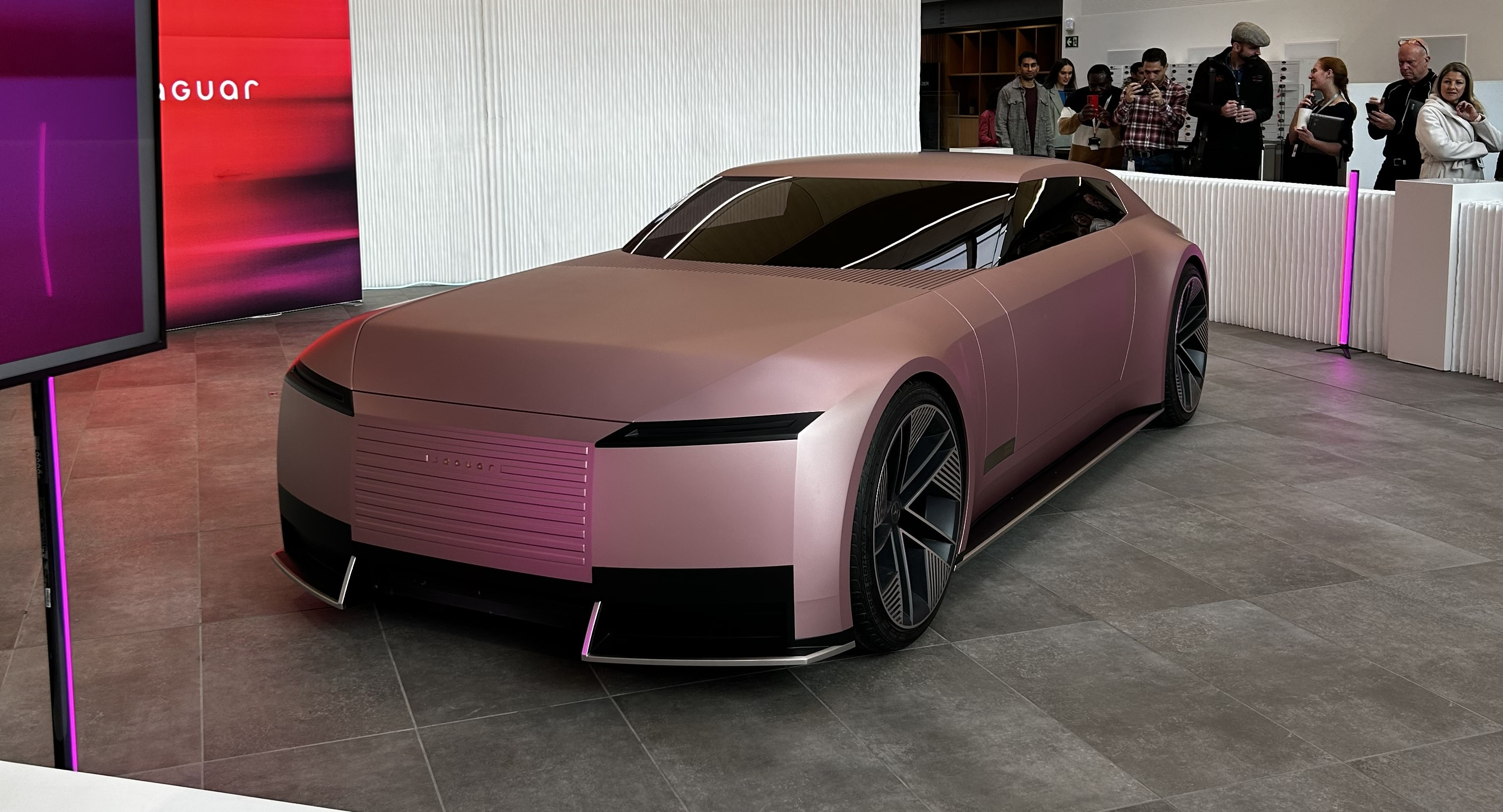
- A front view of the Jaguar Type 00 concept car

Overview
- Manufacturer: Jaguar Land Rover
- Production: 2024
- Designer: Gerry McGovern (design chief); Tom Holden (interior design chief)

Body and chassis
- Class: Concept car
- Body style: 2-door coupé
- Platform: Jaguar Electric Architecture (JEA)
- Doors: Butterfly

Powertrain
- Power output: Over 1,000 hp (750 kW; 1,000 PS)
- Transmission: 1-speed
- Electric range: 430 mi (690 km) (EPA); 770 km (480 mi) (WLTP)

The Jaguar Type 00 is a concept electric 2-door coupe officially revealed by British luxury automotive marque Jaguar at Miami Art Week in December 2024.

== Design ==
The vehicle's design was influenced by Renaissance-era architecture. It has been compared to that of the Jaguar E-Type and Rolls-Royce Spectre. The car was made in two colours: Miami Pink, which was inspired by Miami's artwork and renowned 80s neon aesthetic, and London Blue, which reflects the UK.

The car is a two-door coupe with a long bonnet and a fastback roof. It has butterfly doors. There is a grille-like "strikethrough" design on the front and rear. The seats have stone supports and are separated by a brass spine.

The design was not intended for production and instead meant to promote an upcoming line of electric cars. Consequently the first car officially revealed was the Jaguar Type 01 in October 2026.

== Launch ==
In 2024, Jaguar relaunched its brand with a new logo, motto and concept car. The revealed "Jaguar Type 00" at the Miami Art Show was controversial on both online reactions and wider media coverage. The Jaguar Type 00 name (spoken as "zero-zero") draws inspiration from the iconic Jaguar Type series of the past, particularly the renowned E-Type. The first "zero" represents the car's zero-emissions electric powertrain, while the second "zero" is supposedly in reference to the beginning of a "whole new lineage of Jaguars". While only a concept car, it is the first Jaguar car to display the new logo and badge, and the company has stated that it is a representation the direction the company will go with its future design style.

The production electric grand tourer previewed by the Type 00 concept will be named the Type 01. The company said the model would use a tri-motor electric powertrain producing more than 986 hp and 958 lb-ft of torque. Jaguar showcased a prototype of the car at the Formula E race event in Monaco in late May, along with a number of existing production models. It was reported that the company will reveal the final car at some point in 2026.

== Gallery ==
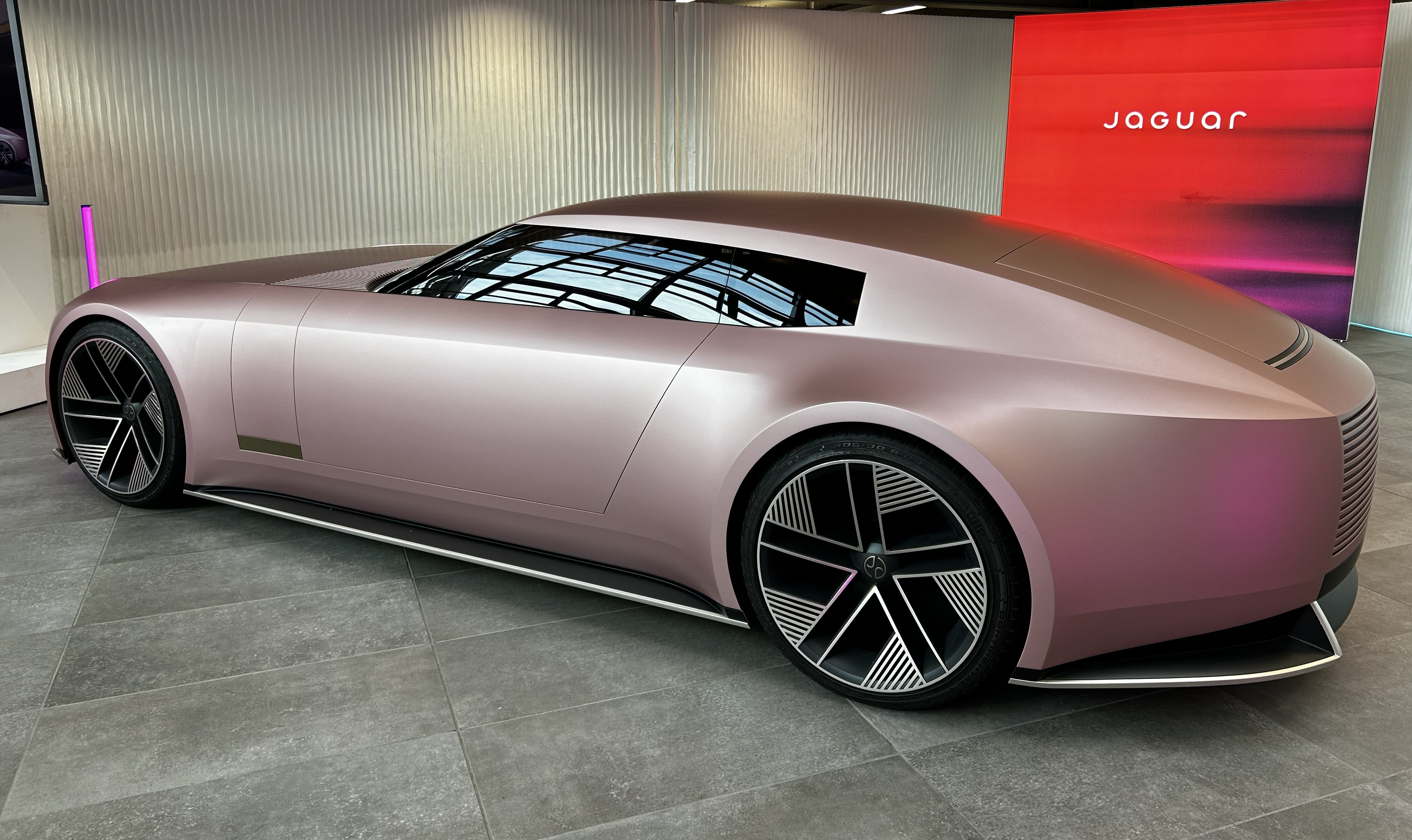
A side view of the Jaguar Type 00 concept car

The new logo revealed on the car
