= NAIC =

NAIC may refer to:

- The National Astronomy and Ionosphere Center
- The North American Industry Classification System
- The National Association of Insurance Commissioners
- The National Air Intelligence Center, the former name of National Air and Space Intelligence Center, a USAF intelligence unit
- The National Automotive Innovation Centre

== Places ==
- Naic, Cavite, Philippines
