= Jaguar Land Rover =

British multinational automobile manufacturer

Jaguar Land Rover Automotive PLC
- Type: Subsidiary
- Industry: Automotive
- Predecessors: Jaguar Cars Limited; Land Rover Limited
- Founded: 18 January 2008; 18 years ago (as Jaguar Land Rover)
- Headquarters: Whitley, Coventry
- Key people: PB Balaji (CEO); Gerry McGovern (CCO)
- Products: Luxury vehicles; Sport utility vehicles
- Production output: ▼428,854 (2025) (Jaguar and Land Rover)
- Brands: Jaguar; Land Rover; Freelander; Rover (dormant); Lanchester (dormant)
- Revenue: ▼£28.961 billion (2025)
- Operating income: ▲£2.47 billion (2025)
- Net income: ▼£1.8 billion (2025)
- Total assets: ▲£26.096 billion (2025)
- Total equity: ▲£8.94 billion (2025)
- Parent: TATA.CARS
- Subsidiaries: Jaguar Land Rover Holdings Limited; Chery Jaguar Land Rover (50%); Freelander; Bowler Motors; Jaguar Land Rover India; Jaguar Land Rover Limited
- Website: jlr.com

Jaguar Land Rover Automotive PLC (JLR) is a British multinational luxury automotive manufacturer and a wholly owned subsidiary of Indian multinational automobile manufacturer Tata Cars. Headquartered in Whitley, Coventry, United Kingdom, the company specializes in designing, developing, manufacturing, and selling luxury automobiles under the brands Jaguar and Land Rover. It is one of the largest auto employers in the United Kingdom, with about 33,000 employees.

Both marques have long histories prior to their merger—Jaguar going back to the 1930s and Land Rover to the 1940s—first coming together in 1968 as part of the British Leyland conglomerate, later again independent of each other, and then as subsidiaries of BMW (in the case of Land Rover), and Ford Motor Company (Jaguar). In 2000, Rover Group was broken up by BMW and Land Rover was sold on to Ford Motor Company, becoming part of its Premier Automotive Group.

Jaguar Land Rover has been a subsidiary of India-based Tata Motors Passenger Vehicles (formerly Tata Motors) since they founded it as a holding company for the acquisition of Jaguar Cars and Land Rover from Ford in 2008. On 1 January 2013, the company was renamed Jaguar Land Rover Automotive PLC as it transitioned into a holding company structure, with its automobile business continuing under the name Jaguar Land Rover Limited.

== History ==
Both businesses having been part of British Leyland for parts of their histories until 1984, Jaguar Cars and Land Rover were eventually reunited into the same group by the Ford Motor Company in 2002. Ford had acquired Jaguar Cars in 1989 and then Land Rover from BMW in 2000. In 2006, Ford purchased the Rover brand name from BMW for around £6 million. This reunited the Rover and Land Rover brands for the first time since the Rover group was broken up by BMW in 2000.

On 18 January 2008, Tata Motors (now Tata Motors Passenger Vehicles), a part of the India-based Tata Group, established Jaguar Land Rover Limited as a British-registered and wholly owned subsidiary. The new company was to be used as a holding company for the acquisition from Ford of the two businesses – Jaguar Cars Limited and Land Rover for US$2.23 billion. That acquisition was completed on 2 June 2008. Included in the deal to buy Land Rover and Jaguar Cars were the rights to three other British brands: the Daimler marque, as well as two dormant brands Lanchester and Rover.

On 1 January 2013, the group, which had been operating as two separate companies (Jaguar Cars Limited and Land Rover), although on an integrated basis, underwent a fundamental restructuring. The parent company was renamed to Jaguar Land Rover Automotive PLC, Jaguar Cars Limited was renamed to Jaguar Land Rover Limited and the assets (excluding certain Chinese interests) of Land Rover were transferred to it. The consequence was that Jaguar Land Rover Limited became responsible in the UK for the design, manufacture and marketing of both Jaguar and Land Rover products.

In addition to the Jaguar and Land Rover marques, JLR also owns the rights to the dormant Daimler, Lanchester and Rover marques. The latter was acquired by Land Rover, whilst still under Ford ownership, from BMW in the aftermath of the collapse of MG Rover Group; BMW had retained ownership of the marque when it broke up Rover Group in 2000, then licensed it to MG Rover.

In April 2025, Jaguar Land Rover announced that it would delay shipments to the United States after President Donald Trump imposed tariffs earlier that month.

In May 2025, it was announced that PB Balaji, the CFO of Tata Motors, would be the CEO from November 2025, succeeding Adrian Mardell who would be retiring after three years in the role.

=== 2025 cyberattack ===
On 2 September 2025, the company announced it had been subject to a cyberattack that it said had "severely disrupted" its operations, including forcing it to pause all production and retail operations. It is noteworthy that JLR benefit from TATA's in house IT specialist global company TCS who were managing cyber security at JLR during this lapse On 24 September, JLR announced the pause in operations had been extended to 1 October 2025. As of 22 October, JLR was slowly restarting parts of its production processes. In their accounts, released in November 2025, it was revealed that the cyber attack cost the business £196 million.

== Investment and expansion ==
In March 2011, Jaguar Land Rover announced that it would hire an additional 1,500 staff at its Halewood plant, and signed over £2 billion of supply contracts with UK-based companies, to enable production of its new Range Rover Evoque model. In September 2011, the company confirmed that it would be investing £355 million in the construction of a new engine plant at the i54 business park near Wolverhampton, central England, to manufacture a family of four-cylinder petrol and diesel engines. In November 2011 Jaguar Land Rover announced that it would be creating 1,000 new jobs at its Solihull plant, a 25 per cent increase in the size of the workforce at the site.

In March 2012, Jaguar Land Rover announced the creation of 1,000 new jobs at its Halewood plant, and a shift to 24-hour production at the plant. In the same month, Jaguar Land Rover and the China-based carmaker Chery agreed to invest an initial US$2.78 billion in a new joint venture, the activities of which would include the manufacture of Jaguar and Land Rover vehicles and engines, the establishment of a research and development facility, the creation of a new automobile marque, and sales of vehicles produced by the company. Jaguar Land Rover planned to create 4,500 manufacturing and engineering jobs in the UK over the next five years.

In late 2012, the company announced a joint venture for Jaguars and Land Rovers to be built in China, now the world's biggest car-market. The agreement was with Chery, China's sixth largest auto manufacturer, and called for a new Chinese factory in Changshu to build vehicles starting in 2014. Trial production at the facility began in April 2014, with a potential capacity of 130,000 vehicles annually. The first production model by the Chery Jaguar Land Rover venture was the Evoque, with other models planned that also include modifications, such as longer wheelbases, to satisfy Chinese market demand.

In September 2013, Jaguar Land Rover announced an additional 1,700 jobs and £1.5 billion investment at its facility in Solihull. The money was to be spent on designing systems to allow the chassis of future models to be made out of aluminium; the first of these would be a new mid-sized sports saloon car to be introduced in 2015. The same month, the company announced plans to open a £100 million research and development centre called the National Automotive Innovation Campus at the University of Warwick, Coventry to create a new generation of vehicle technologies. Jaguar Land Rover was to invest £50 million in the facility, the university and the UK government. The carmaker said around 1,000 academics and engineers would work there and that construction would start in 2014.

Under its chief executive, Ralf Speth, JLR has significantly increased its investment in research and development. In 2013, according to Speth, it invested £3 billion in "product creation" and claimed to be the "biggest R&D investor in the UK in the automotive business".

In 2017 a plant for Ingenium engine production was added to the Chery Jaguar Land Rover facility in China.

On 13 April 2018, Jaguar Land Rover announced that it would be cutting 1,000 temporary contract jobs in the West Midlands, citing a slump in sales due to uncertainty over changes to taxes on diesel cars and Brexit.

In 2019, Jaguar Land Rover purchased Bowler Motors, which became part of its SVO (Special Vehicle Operations) division.

In 2023, as part of its global innovation strategy, Jaguar Land Rover established an open innovation hub in Tel Aviv, Israel, to scout local start ups and collaborate with Israeli technology companies on areas such as supply chain optimisation, sustainability, and connected digital services.

On 20 May 2026, JLR and Stellantis signed a memorandum of understanding to "explore synergies in areas such as product and technology development" within the United States.

== Sales ==
In the year ended 31 March 2013, Jaguar Land Rover sold a total of 374,636 units. In 2016, Jaguar Land Rover became the biggest car manufacturer in the UK, producing 489,923 cars and overtaking Nissan, the previous leader.

In January 2014, the Wall Street Journal reported that Jaguar Land Rover sold a record 425,006 vehicles in 2013 as demand for its luxury vehicles increased in all major markets including in China, North America and Europe.

JLR was struggling by mid-2019 and Tata Motors wrote down its investment in JLR by $3.9 billion. Much of the financial problem was due to a 50% drop in sales in China during 2018, although the situation was improving by autumn 2019. This was confirmed by a third quarter profit of £156 million (pre-tax) versus a £395 million loss in the second quarter; JLR had also experienced a boost in sales in China of 24%. The new Range Rover Evoque was helpful in boosting profit, with a 54.6% increase in worldwide sales. Tata was open to considering a partnership with another company, according to a statement in mid-October, if the partnership agreement would allow Tata to maintain control of the business. The company ruled out the possibility of a sale of JLR to another entity.

== Corporate affairs ==
Jaguar Land Rover Automotive is a public limited company incorporated under the laws of England and Wales (Company No. 06477691). The immediate parent of Jaguar Land Rover Automotive is TML Holdings, Singapore and the ultimate parent undertaking and controlling party is Tata Motors of India.

Jaguar Land Rover Automotive's principal active subsidiaries are:

- Jaguar Land Rover Holdings
- Jaguar Land Rover (designs, manufactures and sells Jaguar and Land Rover vehicles)

=== Senior leadership ===
| Name | Position | Year appointed |
|---|---|---|
| Natarajan Chandrasekaran | Chairman | 2017 |
| PB Balaji | Chief executive officer | 2025 |
| Gerry McGovern | Chief creative officer | 2013 |

=== Former chairmen ===
- Ratan Tata
- Cyrus Mistry

=== Former CEOs ===
- Ralf Speth (2010–2020)
- Thierry Bolloré (2020–2022)
- Adrian Mardell (2023–2025)

=== Financial data ===
| Year ending | Turnover (£M) | EBITDA (£M) | Net income / (loss) before tax (£M) |
|---|---|---|---|
| 31 March 2023 | 22,809 | 2,571 | (64) |
| 31 March 2022 | 18,320 | 1,896 | (455) |
| 31 March 2021 | 19,731 | 2,531 | (861) |
| 31 March 2020 | 22,984 | 2,000 | (422) |
| 31 March 2019 | 24,214 | 1,981 | (3,629) |
| 31 March 2018 | 25,786 | 2,794 | 1,512 |
| 31 March 2017 | 24,339 | 3,000 | 1,600 |
| 31 March 2016 | 22,208 | 3,313 | 1,557 |
| 31 March 2015 | 21,866 | 4,132 | 2,614 |
| 31 March 2014 | 19,386 | 3,393 | 2,501 |
| 31 March 2013 | 15,785 | 2,402 | 1,674 |
| 31 March 2012 | 13,512 | 2,027 | 1,479 |
| 31 March 2011 | 9,870.7 | 1,501.7 | 1,115 |
| 31 March 2010 | 6,527.2 | 349.1 | 51.4 |
| 31 March 2009 | 4,949.5 | (83.9) | (375.7) |

== Operations ==
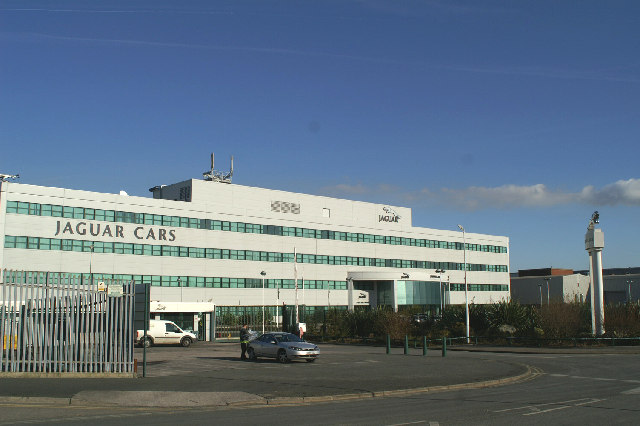
Jaguar Land Rover Halewood, Liverpool

Jaguar Land Rover has six main facilities for research and development, manufacturing and vehicle assembly, of which five are in the UK and one in India.

Jaguar Land Rover has three research and development facilities in the UK:

- Jaguar Land Rover Gaydon Centre, Warwickshire – an engineering and development facility which was formerly the Land Rover headquarters. Formerly an RAF bomber base before being acquired by British Leyland and redeveloped as a vehicle design, development and testing centre.
- Whitley plant, Coventry – an engineering and development site and headquarters of Jaguar Land Rover which was formerly the Jaguar Cars head office. This site was acquired from Peugeot in the 1980s, and was formerly a First World War airfield, an aircraft factory and then a missile factory before being sold to the Rootes Group (later Chrysler Europe).
- JLR is a partner in the National Automotive Innovation Centre at the University of Warwick, Coventry.

Vehicle assembly plants:

- Jaguar Land Rover Halewood, Halewood, Merseyside. Used by Jaguar Land Rover for Land Rover production. Originally a Ford assembly plant (the Ford Escort being its most prolific model) it was given to Jaguar in 2000 for production of the X-Type. Ford still owns the transmission manufacturing operation at Halewood.
  - Land Rover Discovery Sport, Range Rover Evoque
- Solihull plant, Lode Heath, Solihull, West Midlands. Jaguar Land Rover's principal Land Rover assembly plant. This was originally an aircraft engine plant during World War Two, then became a Rover Company plant after the war. It produced Rover passenger cars until 1982, and has been the production site of the classic Land-Rover (both Series and Defender) and the full-size Range Rover for their entire production runs. In 2014, the Jaguar XE became the first Jaguar car to be assembled here, followed by the F-Pace in 2016.
  - Range Rover, Range Rover Sport, Range Rover Velar, Jaguar F-Pace
- Jaguar Land Rover India, Pune, India
  - Jaguar XF, Range Rover Evoque, Range Rover Velar
- Jaguar Land Rover India, Tamil Nadu, India (planned)
- Chery Jaguar Land Rover, Changshu, China
  - Range Rover Evoque, Land Rover Discovery Sport, Jaguar XE, Jaguar XF
- JLR Brazil, Itatiaia, Brazil
  - Range Rover Evoque, Land Rover Discovery Sport
- JLR Slovakia, Nitra, Slovakia
  - Land Rover Discovery, Land Rover Defender

Pressed steel body panel production plant:

- Castle Bromwich Assembly, Birmingham. Formerly Jaguar Land Rover's main Jaguar assembly plant before production of complete cars was ended in May 2024. The plant continues to produce pressed steel panel body components for Jaguar cars built elsewhere. Originally an aircraft factory during World War Two – Spitfires were built here – it was later acquired by Pressed Steel Fisher and became a vehicle body assembly works. It came under the auspices of Jaguar through the merger with BMC in the 1960s.

SVO facility:

- Ryton-on-Dunsmore, Warwickshire – where the Special Vehicle Operations development centre was created in 2016. The site was previously used by Rootes for aircraft production plant for World War Two, and later became the Rootes/Chrysler/Peugeot car plant which was closed in 2006 and has since been demolished.

Engine assembly plants:

- Engine Manufacturing Centre, Wolverhampton. A £500 million facility located at the i54 site in Staffordshire close to Wolverhampton where the Ingenium family of modular diesel and petrol engines are built. The plant was officially opened by Queen Elizabeth II on Thursday 30 October 2014.
- Chery Jaguar Land Rover, Changshu, China.

Planned facilities:

- Software engineering facility, Shannon, Ireland
- Storage depot, Stone, Staffordshire
- Ranipet, Tamil Nadu, India

Co-operations

- The Magna Steyr company in Graz, Austria, built the Jaguar E-Pace (2017–2024) and the Jaguar I-Pace (2018–2024).

In 2020, Jaguar Land Rover's UK production facilities were halted for the period from 20 March to 20 April due to COVID-19 pandemic.

== Products ==
Jaguar Land Rover currently sells vehicles under the Jaguar and Land Rover marques.

=== NOx emissions ratings ===
In March 2019, Jaguar Land Rover became the first European car producer to submit new cars from its marques to AIR Index to receive NOx emissions ratings.

AIR Index ratings for JLR cars (Euro 6 allows up to 80 mg/km NOx emission)
| Model | Year | Fuel | NOx measured (mg/km) | AIR Index rating |
|---|---|---|---|---|
| Jaguar E-Pace HSE 2.0I 180 hp | 2019 | Diesel | 14 | A |
| Range Rover Evoque TD4 2.0I 180 hp | 2019 | Diesel | 17 | A |
| Land Rover Discovery 3.0 TD6 HSE | 2018 | Diesel | 33 | A |
| Land Rover Discovery Sport 2.0I 180 hp | 2019 | Diesel | 34 | A |

=== Future electrification ===
In September 2017, Jaguar Land Rover announced that all new Jaguar and Land Rover models launched from the 2020 model year will have an all-electric or hybrid powertrain option. In October 2017, JLR announced that its electrification programme will start with the Range Rover Sport P400e for the 2018 model year, a plug-in hybrid model due in the showrooms in late 2017. and be followed by the launch of a plug-in hybrid Range Rover due in 2018 for the 2019 model year. Jaguar Land Rover paid $49.5 million in fines for missing its American Corporate Average Fuel Economy targets over the 2009–2013 model years.

At the beginning of June 2019, JLR and BMW announced that they will collaborate "to develop next generation electric drive units". On 5 July 2019, JLR confirmed that they intended to build an all-electric XJ luxury saloon car, at their Castle Bromwich plant. The car was expected to be launched in 2020. On 15 February 2021, CEO Thierry Bolloré announced that development on the all-electric XJ saloon has been cancelled due to poor sales of saloons in general, as people around the world are preferring crossovers, SUVs, and pick-up trucks over saloons, coupes, convertibles, estates, hatchbacks, and compact cars, especially in the Americas, Oceania, Africa, and the Middle East.

In February 2021, JLR announced that the entire Jaguar range will become all-electric for the 2025 model year. The company also stated that it will introduce its first all-electric Land Rover vehicle in 2023 as a 2024 model year. JLR also stated that it will end production and sales of diesel-powered Land Rover vehicles in 2026, with production and sales of petrol-powered Land Rover vehicles ending in 2030. This will lead to Jaguar Land Rover becoming 100% all-electric by the 2030s. CEO Thierry Bolloré clearly stated that this is to help JLR comply with the incoming more stringent emission standards and the phase-out and banning of fossil fuel vehicles by 2030 from Europe, India, China, South Korea, Japan, United States, etc. due to climate change and air pollution. This also comes after the United Kingdom passed legislation in February 2020, that will ban new sales of all fossil fuel vehicles from the UK by 2030. Bolloré also stated that all the upcoming electric vehicles being introduced by JLR and other car manufacturers should also become more mainstream and eventually overtake fossil fuel vehicles.

=== Current Jaguar products ===
- Jaguar Type 01 (full size 4-door grand tourer; upcoming)

=== Former Jaguar products ===
- Jaguar XE (compact executive car)
- Jaguar XF (executive saloon & estate)
- Jaguar F-Type (sports car - coupé and convertible)
- Jaguar E-Pace (high end subcompact luxury SUV)
- Jaguar F-Pace (compact luxury SUV)
- Jaguar I-Pace (compact luxury electric SUV)

| Jaguar XE | Jaguar XF | Jaguar F-Type | Jaguar E-Pace | Jaguar F-Pace | Jaguar I-Pace |

=== Current Land Rover products ===
- Discovery (mid-size luxury SUV)
- Discovery Sport (subcompact luxury SUV)
- Defender (off-road luxury 4x4)
- Range Rover (full-size luxury SUV)
- Range Rover Sport (mid-size luxury SUV)
- Range Rover Velar (high end compact luxury SUV)
- Range Rover Evoque (high end subcompact luxury SUV)

In September 2026, the Defender Wolf Series II was launched, which will compete for the UK Ministry of Defence Light Mobility Vehicle tender. Initially four variants were announced: a general mobility vehicle, a tactical mobility vehicle, a pickup-style utility vehicle and an ambulance.

| Discovery | Discovery Sport | Defender | Range Rover | Range Rover Sport | Range Rover Velar | Range Rover Evoque |
