= Jaguar XE =

Large family car by Jaguar, 2015 to 2024

Jaguar XE (X760)
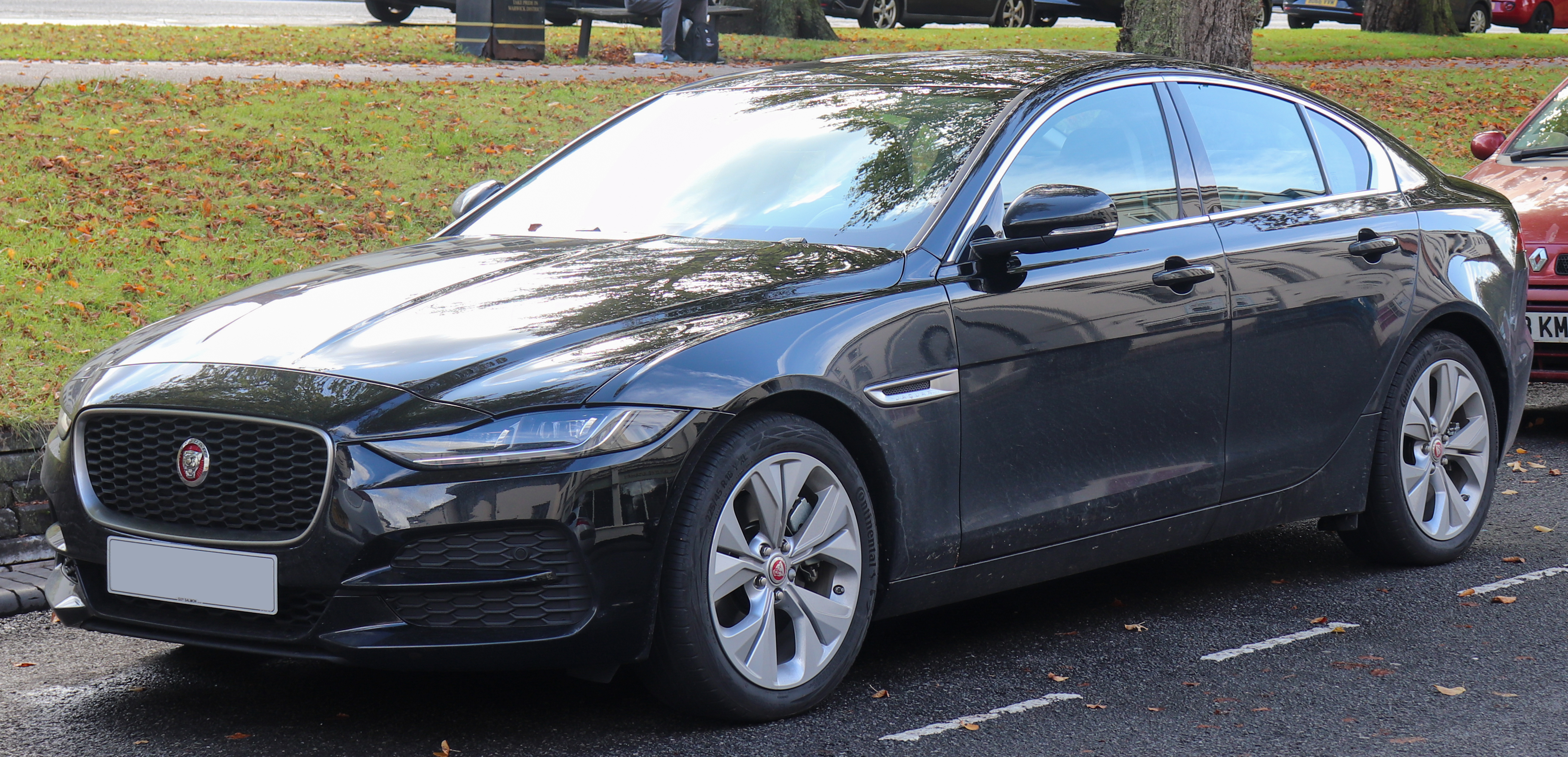

Overview
- Manufacturer: Jaguar Land Rover
- Model code: X760
- Also called: Jaguar XEL (China, LWB)
- Production: April 2015–2024
- Model years: 2016–2024 (North America)
- Assembly: United Kingdom: Solihull (Solihull plant); Birmingham (Castle Bromwich Assembly); Ryton-on-Dunsmore (Project 8 only); China: Changshu (Chery Jaguar Land Rover); India: Pune (JLR India)
- Designer: Ian Callum (2013)

Body and chassis
- Class: Compact executive car (D)
- Body style: 4-door saloon
- Layout: FR layout / F4 layout
- Platform: JLR D7a
- Related: Jaguar F-Pace; Jaguar XF (X260); Range Rover Velar

Powertrain
- Engine: Petrol: 2.0 L Ford EcoBoost turbo I4 (until 2017); 2.0 L Ingenium turbo I4 (since 2015); 3.0 L AJ126 supercharged V6 (until 2019); 5.0 L AJ133 supercharged V8 (SV Project 8); Diesel: 2.0 L Ingenium turbo I4 (since 2015)
- Transmission: 6-speed manual (ZF); 8-speed automatic (ZF 8HP45 or 8HP70)
- Hybrid drivetrain: Mild hybrid (since 2021)

Dimensions
- Wheelbase: 2,835 mm (111.6 in); 2,935 mm (115.6 in) (XEL)
- Length: 4,672 mm (183.9 in); 4,788 mm (188.5 in) (XEL)
- Width: 1,850 mm (72.8 in)
- Height: 1,416 mm (55.7 in); 1,429 mm (56.3 in) (XEL)
- Kerb weight: 1,474 kg (3,250 lb) - 1,665 kg (3,671 lb)

Chronology
- Predecessor: Jaguar X-Type

The Jaguar XE (X760) is a compact executive car manufactured by Jaguar Land Rover and marketed under their Jaguar marque from April 2015 until mid-2024 across a single generation. It is a four-door saloon car with a front-mounted engine and either rear-wheel drive or all-wheel drive.

The successor to the X-Type, it was designed by Ian Callum and launched at the October 2014 Paris Motor Show.

The XE has an aluminium suspension as well as its bonded-and-riveted unitary aluminium monocoque structure, without need for a reinforcing space frame. This was developed by Jaguar on their third generation XJ-series (X350; from 2002) — the first in its segment.

== Launch ==
The XE was announced, but not displayed, at the 2014 Geneva Motor Show and debuted globally on 8 September 2014 in London. Sales were expected to begin in most markets in 2015, followed by the United States in 2016. Production formally commenced on 13 April 2015 at Jaguar Land Rover's Solihull plant.

== Production ==
The XE was the first Jaguar to be built at the factory in Solihull, which was to be dedicated to the manufacture of aluminium vehicles under both the Jaguar and Land Rover brands, including the second-generation Range Rover Sport. Due to high demand for the vehicle, production capacity was increased by adding a line at Castle Bromwich Assembly. Production transferred completely to Castle Bromwich in 2017 as part of a £100m refit.

An extended-wheelbase version—exclusively for the Chinese market—called XEL commenced production at the Chery Jaguar Land Rover plant in Changshu in 2015.

== Engines ==
The XE was the first application of Jaguar Land Rover's new 2.0 L turbocharged Ingenium four-cylinder engine. The Ingenium technology licenses the Multiair/UniAir electrohydraulic variable valve lift system from Schaeffler Group, which Schaeffler in turn licensed from Fiat Chrysler Automobiles in 2001. The system, developed by Fiat Powertrain Technologies, is a hydraulically actuated variable valve lift (VVL) technology enabling "cylinder by cylinder, stroke by stroke" control of intake air directly via an internal combustion engine's inlet valves.

The four-cylinder is available in both petrol and diesel variants, in a range of different power outputs. The 163 PS (120 kW; 161 hp) diesel significantly reduced consumption and carbon emission figures, and is capable of fuel consumption less than 68.9 mpg_{‑imp} (4.10 L/100 km; 57.4 mpg_{‑US}) and producing CO_{2} emissions of only 99 g/km. The cleanest models in Britain pay no annual Vehicle Excise Duty.

From the XE's launch until 2017 the petrol four-cylinders were from Ford's family of "EcoBoost" engines. New Ingenium petrol engines replaced the Ford units beginning in the 2018 model year.

From the XE's launch until 2019 the petrol V6 was from Jaguar's family of AJ-V8 engines. After 2019, the V6 engine was no longer offered.

In late 2020, mild hybrid options were announced, as modifications to the Ingenium 2.0L engines with an additional 48 Volt belt alternator starter system.

Diesel Engines
Name	Displacement	Cylinders	Transmission	Power	Torque	Emissions CO_{2}	Top speed	Acceleration 0–62 mph (0–100 km/h)	Note
20d 163 PS E-Performance	1,999 cc (122.0 cu in)	Inline 4	6-speed manual	163 PS (120 kW; 161 bhp)	380 N⋅m (280 lb⋅ft)	99 g/km	132 mph (212 km/h)	9.4 s	Ingenium
20d 163 PS E-Performance	1,999 cc (122.0 cu in)	Inline 4	8-speed auto	163 PS (120 kW; 161 bhp)	380 N⋅m (280 lb⋅ft)	106 g/km	132 mph (212 km/h)	8.8 s	Ingenium
20d 163 PS	1,999 cc (122.0 cu in)	Inline 4	6-speed manual	163 PS (120 kW; 161 bhp)	380 N⋅m (280 lb⋅ft)	126 g/km	132 mph (212 km/h)	9.4 s	Ingenium
20d 163 PS	1,999 cc (122.0 cu in)	Inline 4	8-speed auto	163 PS (120 kW; 161 bhp)	380 N⋅m (280 lb⋅ft)	135 g/km	132 mph (212 km/h)	8.8 s	Ingenium
20d 180 PS (2015–2019); D180 (2019–present)	1,999 cc (122.0 cu in)	Inline 4	8-speed auto	180 PS (132 kW; 178 bhp)	431 N⋅m (318 lb⋅ft)	137 g/km	140 mph (225 km/h)	7.6 s	Ingenium, rear-wheel drive
20d 180 PS (2015–2019); D180 (2019–present)	1,999 cc (122.0 cu in)	Inline 4	8-speed auto	180 PS (132 kW; 178 bhp)	431 N⋅m (318 lb⋅ft)	145 g/km	140 mph (225 km/h)	7.6 s	Ingenium, all-wheel drive
25d	1,999 cc (122.0 cu in)	Inline 4	8-speed auto	240 PS (177 kW; 237 bhp)	500 N⋅m (369 lb⋅ft)	153 g/km	155 mph (249 km/h)	6.5 s	Ingenium, all-wheel drive
Petrol Engines
Name	Displacement	Cylinders	Transmission	Power	Torque	Emissions CO_{2}	Top speed	Acceleration 0-62 mph (0-100 km/h)	Note
20t 200 PS	1,999 cc (122.0 cu in)	Inline 4	8-speed auto	200 PS (147 kW; 197 bhp)	320 N⋅m (236 lb⋅ft)	164 g/km	147 mph (237 km/h)	7.6 s	Ford EcoBoost, 2015–2017
20t 200 PS	1,997 cc (121.9 cu in)	Inline 4	8-speed auto	200 PS (147 kW; 197 bhp)	320 N⋅m (236 lb⋅ft)				Ingenium, 2017–2019
25t 240 PS	1,999 cc (122.0 cu in)	Inline 4	8-speed auto	240 PS (177 kW; 237 bhp)	340 N⋅m (251 lb⋅ft)	164 g/km	155 mph (249 km/h)	6.8 s	Ford EcoBoost, 2015–2017
25t 250 PS (2017–2019); P250 (2019–present)	1,997 cc (121.9 cu in)	Inline 4	8-speed auto	250 PS (184 kW; 247 bhp)	365 N⋅m (269 lb⋅ft)	164 g/km	155 mph (249 km/h)	6.5 s	Ingenium
30t (2017–2019); P300 (2019–present)	1,997 cc (121.9 cu in)	Inline 4	8-speed auto	300 PS (221 kW; 296 bhp)	400 N⋅m (295 lb⋅ft)	173 g/km	155 mph (249 km/h)	5.7 s	Ingenium
35t / S 340 PS	2,995 cc (182.8 cu in)	V6	8-speed auto	340 PS (250 kW; 335 bhp)	450 N⋅m (332 lb⋅ft)	194 g/km	155 mph (249 km/h)	4.9 s	AJ126, 2015–2017
S 380 PS	2,995 cc (182.8 cu in)	V6	8-speed auto	380 PS (279 kW; 375 bhp)	450 N⋅m (332 lb⋅ft)	194 g/km	155 mph (249 km/h)	4.8 s	AJ126, 2017–2019 (Europe) / 2018–2019 (North America)
SV Project 8	5,000 cc (310 cu in)	V8	8-speed auto	600 PS (441 kW; 592 bhp)	700 N⋅m (516 lb⋅ft)	254 g/km	200 mph (322 km/h)	3.7 s	AJ-V8, 2018 (limited 300 cars)

== Design ==
=== Exterior ===
Ian Callum designed the XE's exterior. The construction features bonded and riveted aluminium construction, with bolt-on front and rear crash structure and key body panels to simplify repair and decrease insurance costs. In the event of a collision with a pedestrian, the active bonnet pops up to provide additional protection.

The exterior design has a drag co-efficient of 0.26.

In 2019, the XE was facelifted, bringing updates to the exterior as well as the interior.

=== Interior ===
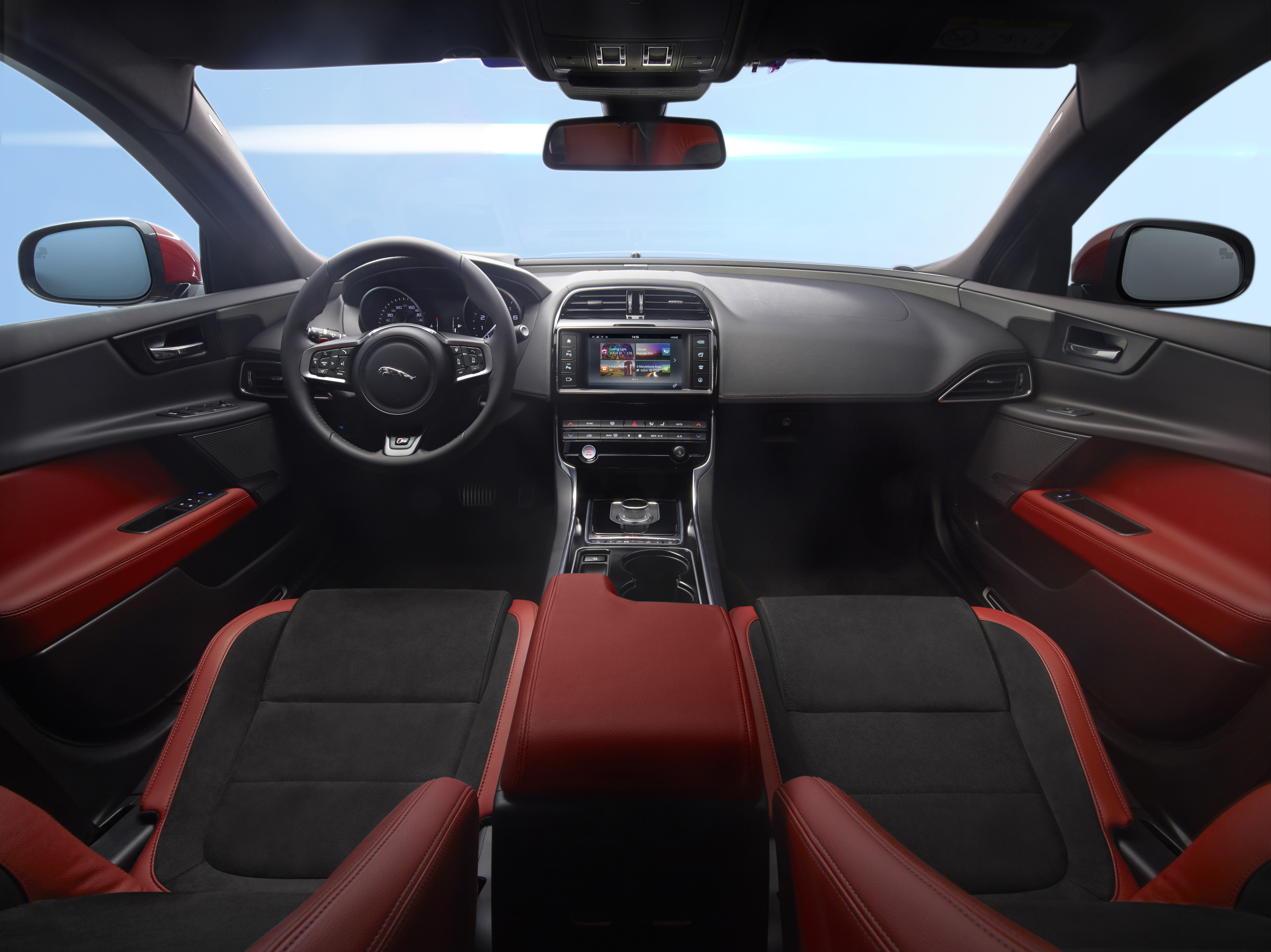
XE S pre-facelift interior

The interior features a flush rotary gear selector which rises and becomes functional once the engine is started. The central console features an 8-inch (20 cm) or optional 10.2-inch touch screen, providing access to in car entertainment, satellite navigation and vehicle settings. The XE features smartphone connectivity and some models allow the owner to pre-heat the interior or unlock the car remotely, using a smartphone application. A laser colour head-up display is an available option.

Interior revisions in 2017 include cupholder covers, revised and higher resolution display and standard infotainment interface marketed as InControl Touch Pro reliant on a user-provided data connection SIM card.

In 2019, the interior was revised with new door panels, centre tunnel and a revised infotainment system marketed as InControl Touch Pro Duo, shared with other Jaguar Land Rover products. The automatic's rising rotary knob gear selector was replaced with a more conventional type marketed as the Sport Shift Selector.

== Construction ==
=== Platform ===
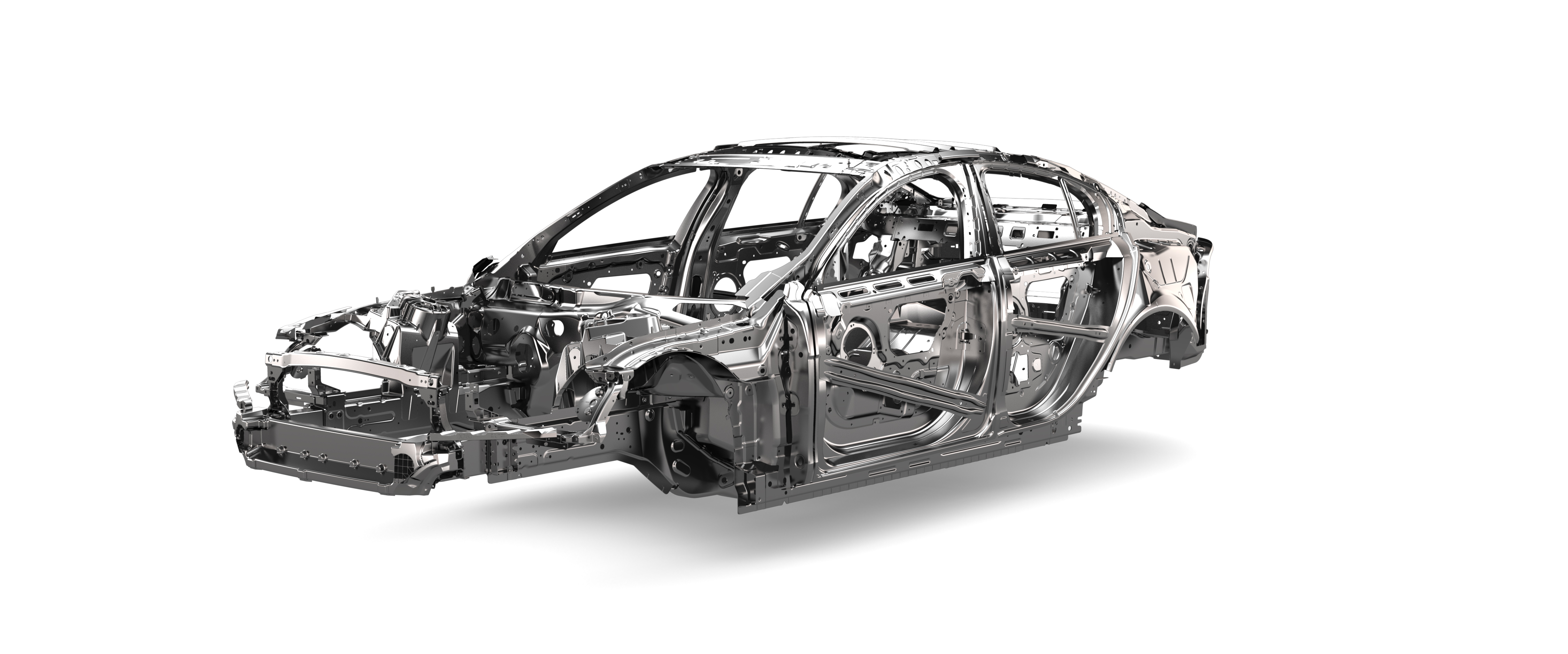
Jaguar XE structure

The XE is the first built on the Jaguar Land Rover iQ[Al] (D7a) modular platform, also used for the second generation Jaguar XF (X260) model, the Jaguar F-Pace sports utility vehicle and the Range Rover Velar. The design features double wishbone suspension at the front, with similarities to the system fitted to the XF and F-Type models, the rear features an entirely new subframe mounted multi-link suspension system, marketed as Integral Link. The system is costlier to manufacture but allows for greater tuning.

The major suspension components are manufactured from aluminium to reduce the unsprung as well as overall vehicle mass and increase the suspension system stiffness. The suspension system features sacrificial slip-fixings to protect expensive major components from damage. To create the 50:50 weight balance the battery is located in the boot, consuming space normally accommodating the spare wheel. The rear boot floor and boot lid are steel, contributing to balanced weight distribution.

Single-piston brake calipers are provided with one of three different sizes of brake discs fitted, depending on the vehicle's configuration. An electric power steering system is fitted and the XE comes with a choice of four different road wheel sizes. Initially there were eight available alloy wheel designs.

=== Transmission ===
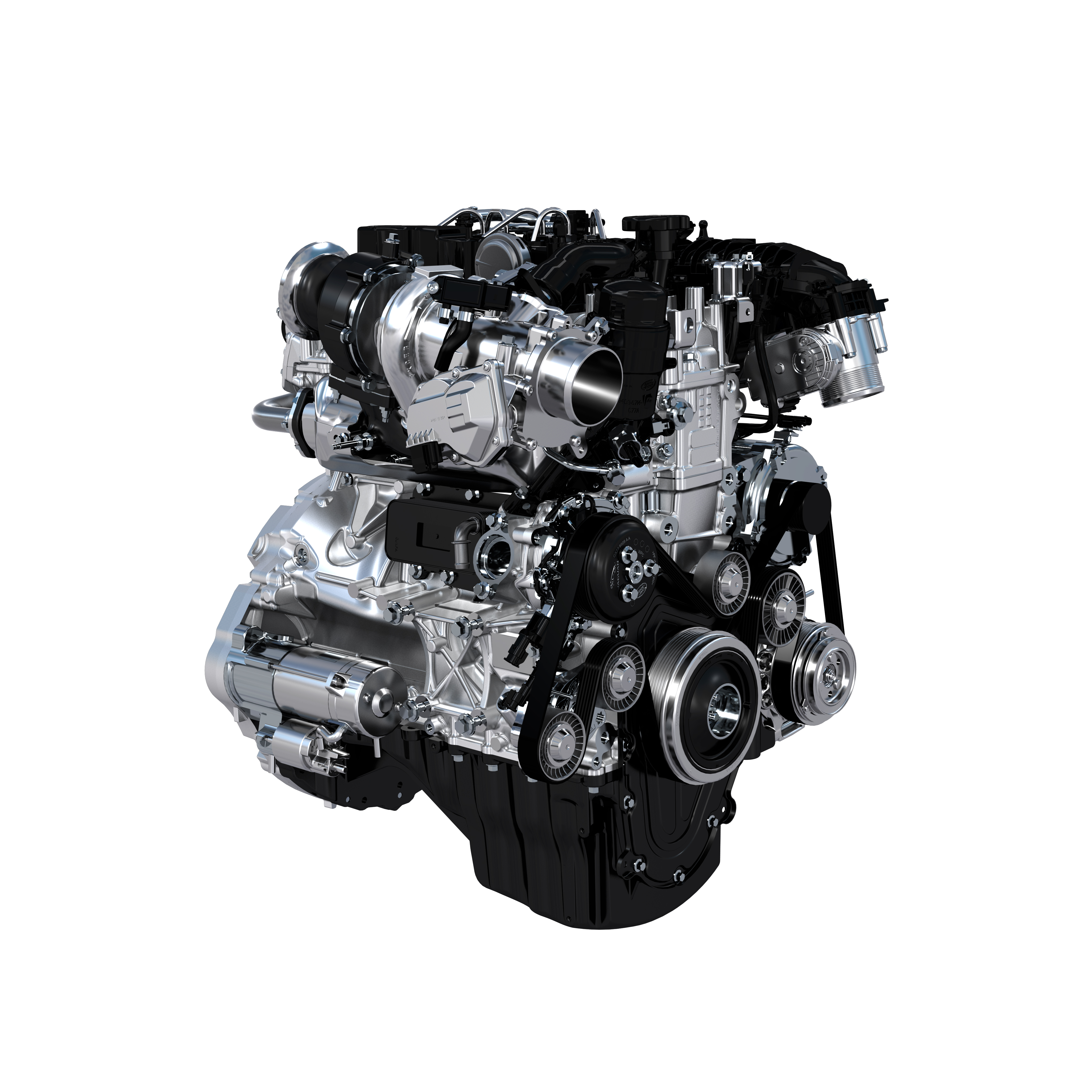
Jaguar Land Rover Ingenium engine

Initially offered with rear-wheel drive, the D7a modular architecture was designed to accommodate all-wheel drive (AWD), which was offered in November 2015.

All XE models are equipped with a ZF 8HP45 or ZF 8HP70 eight-speed automatic transmission, a lighter variant of the gearbox currently fitted to other Jaguar models and period competitor BMW 3 Series (F30). A six-speed ZF manual gearbox is available on diesel models.

The XE uses a traction control system marketed as All Surface Progress Control, developed from the Terrain Response system fitted to Land Rover's off-road vehicles and allowing better traction in snow and ice.

== Security and safety ==
Jaguar expected the XE to obtain a five star Euro NCAP safety rating which was proven in 2015. The design features several safety features now mandatory to be considered for a five star rating, including the Advanced Emergency Braking System (pre-crash system).

Euro NCAP 2015 XE	Score
Overall:	5/5 stars
Adult Occupant:	92%
Child Occupant:	82%
Pedestrian:	81%
Safety Assist:	82%

The XE was tested by Thatcham's New Vehicle Security Ratings (NVSR) organisation and achieved the following ratings:

Saloon	Rating
Theft of car:	5/5 stars
Theft from car:	4/5 stars

ANCAP test results* Jaguar XE (2015, aligned with Euro NCAP)
Test	Points	%
Overall:	5 /5 stars	
Adult occupant:	35.3	92%
Child occupant:	40.5	82%
Pedestrian:	29.4	81%
Safety assist:	10.7	82%

== SV Project 8 ==
A limited-production, high-performance version of the XE called SV Project 8 debuted at the 2017 Goodwood Festival of Speed. The base car was modified by Jaguar Land Rover's Special Vehicle Operations (SVO) team, with carbon fibre body panels and aerodynamic aids including a front splitter and rear wing, carbon fibre and Alcantara interior trim, 400 mm carbon ceramic brake discs in front with six-piston calipers, unique 20-inch wheels with Michelin Sport Cup 2 tyres, and a supercharged and intercooled 592 hp version of the 5.0 L Jaguar AJ-V8.

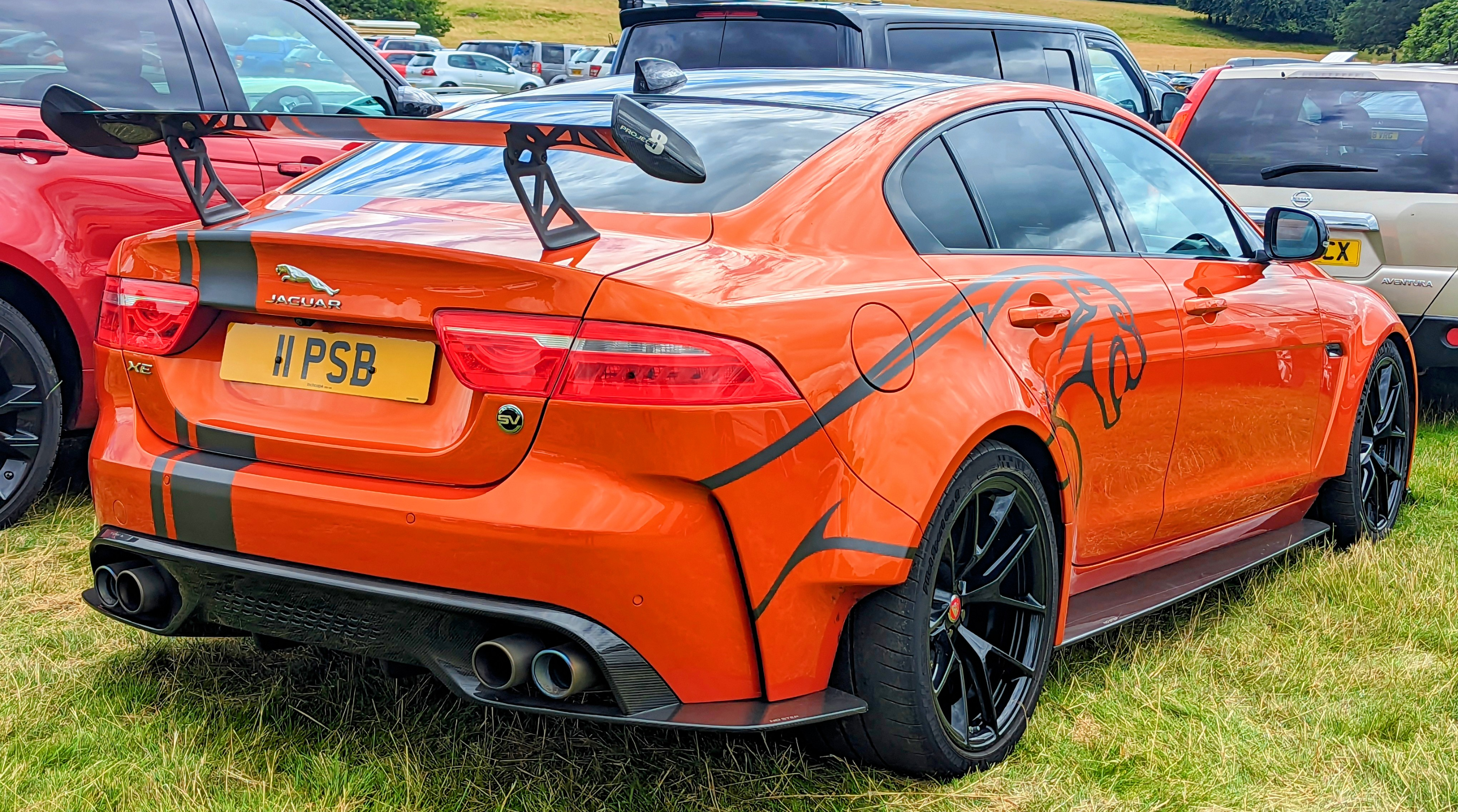

In the typical trim, the Project 8 has four leather-trimmed bucket seats, with the two front seats mounted on lightweight magnesium frames. A "track package", not available in the United States, features a harness retention hoop in place of the rear seats, and carbon fibre racing seats with four-point competition harnesses installed in the front.

Total production is limited to 300 worldwide.

== Worldwide sales ==
Worldwide sales
Year	Sales
2015	23,621
2016	44,095
2017	38,696
2018	30,654
2019	25,951
Total	163,017

XEL
Year	China
2023	10,266
2024	8,314
2025	6,523

== Gallery ==
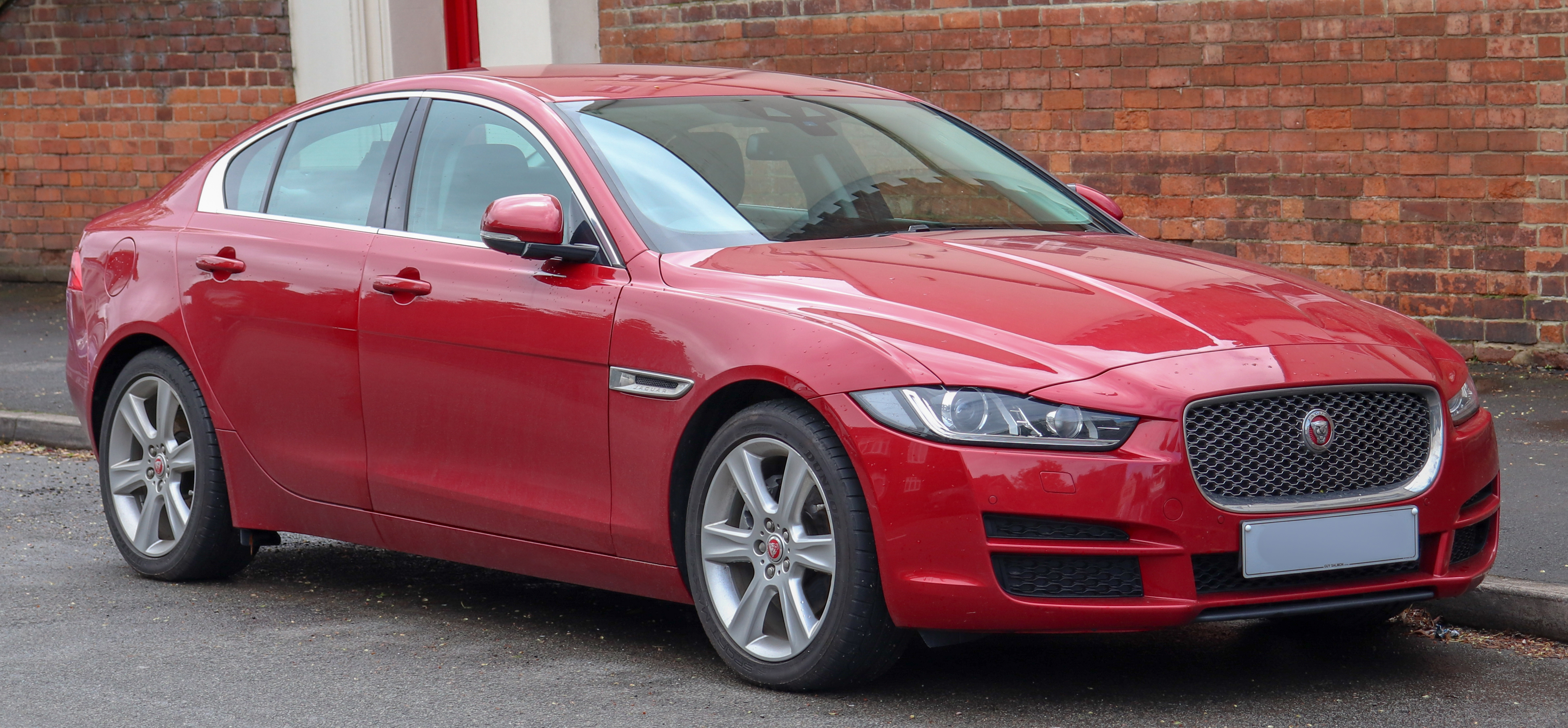
Jaguar XE Portfolio (UK)

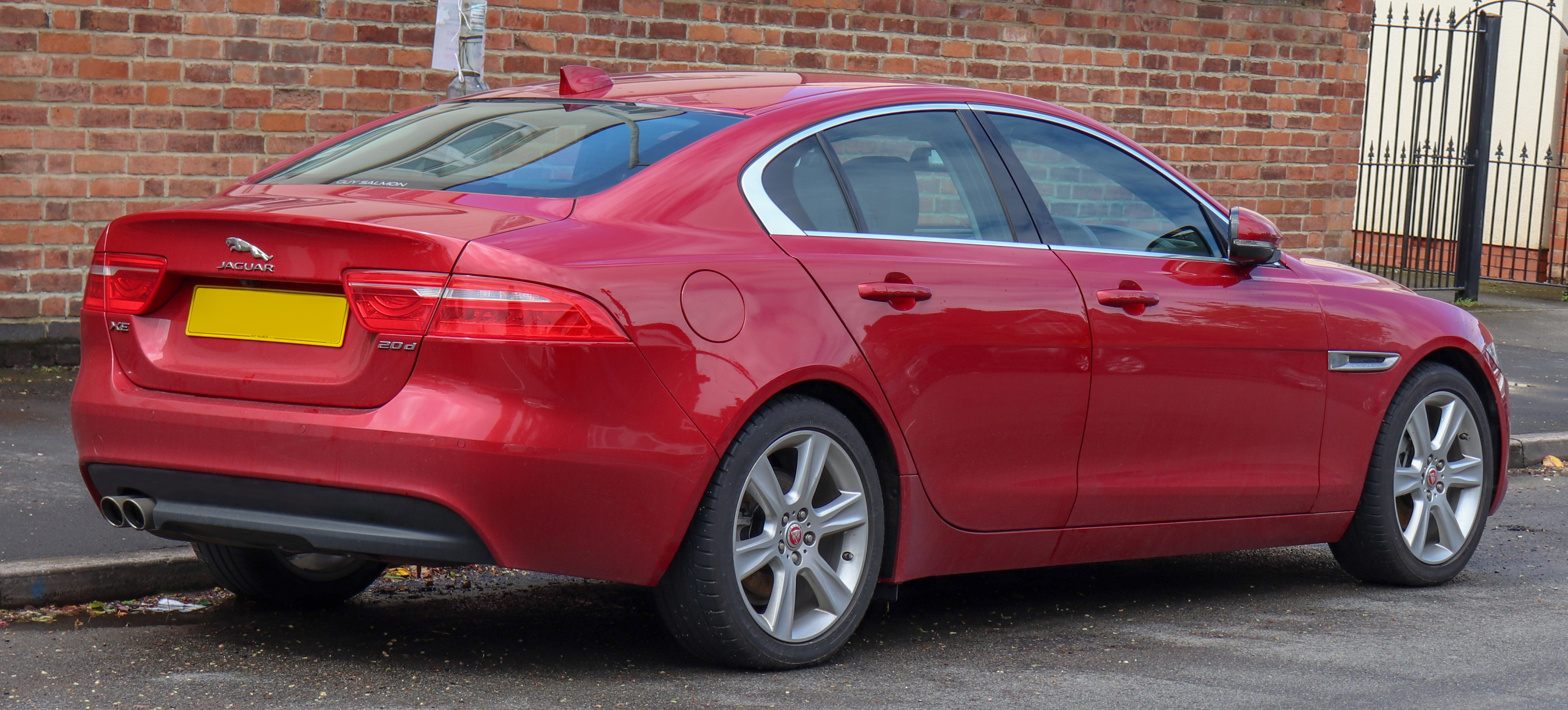
Jaguar XE Portfolio (UK)

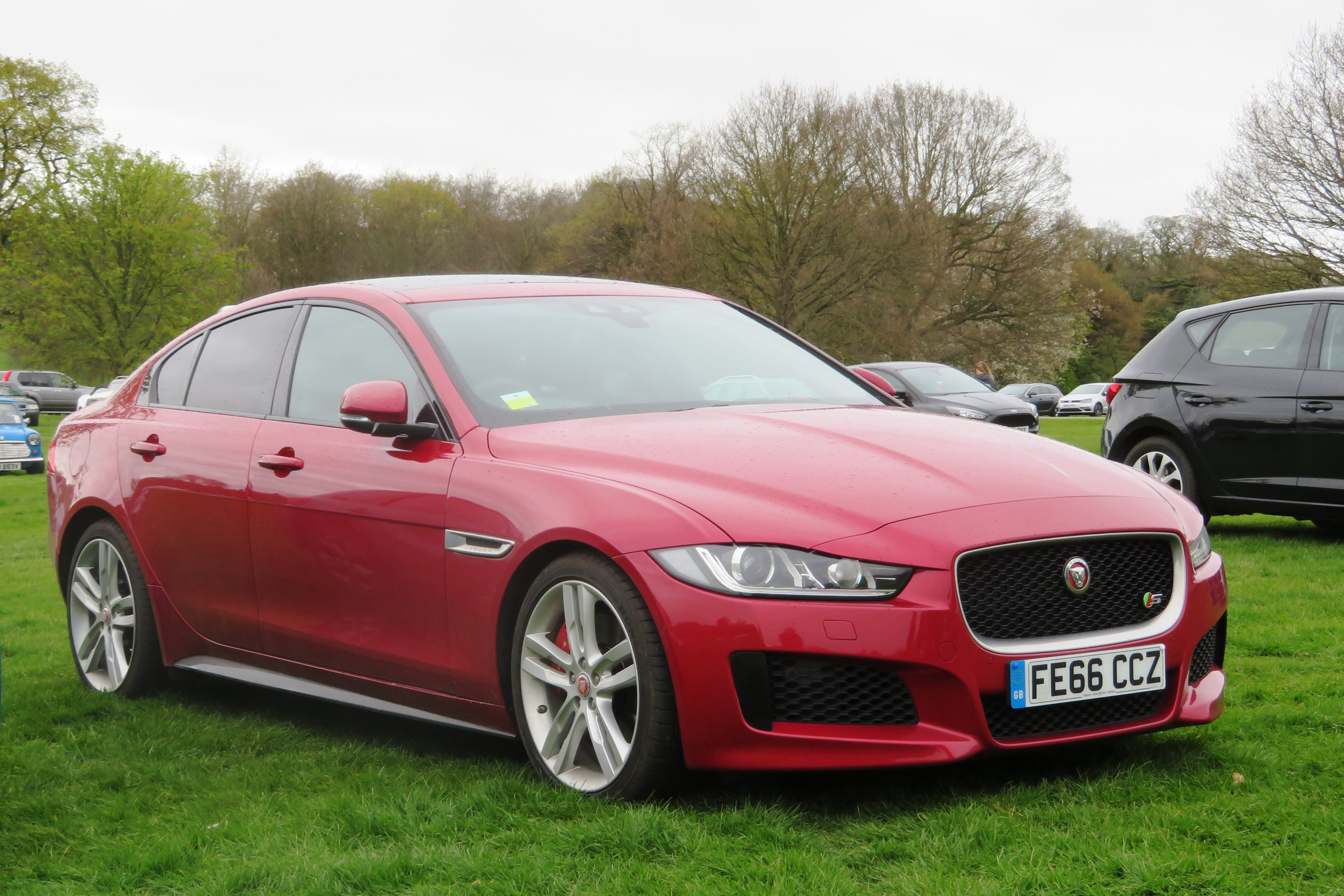
Jaguar XE S (UK)

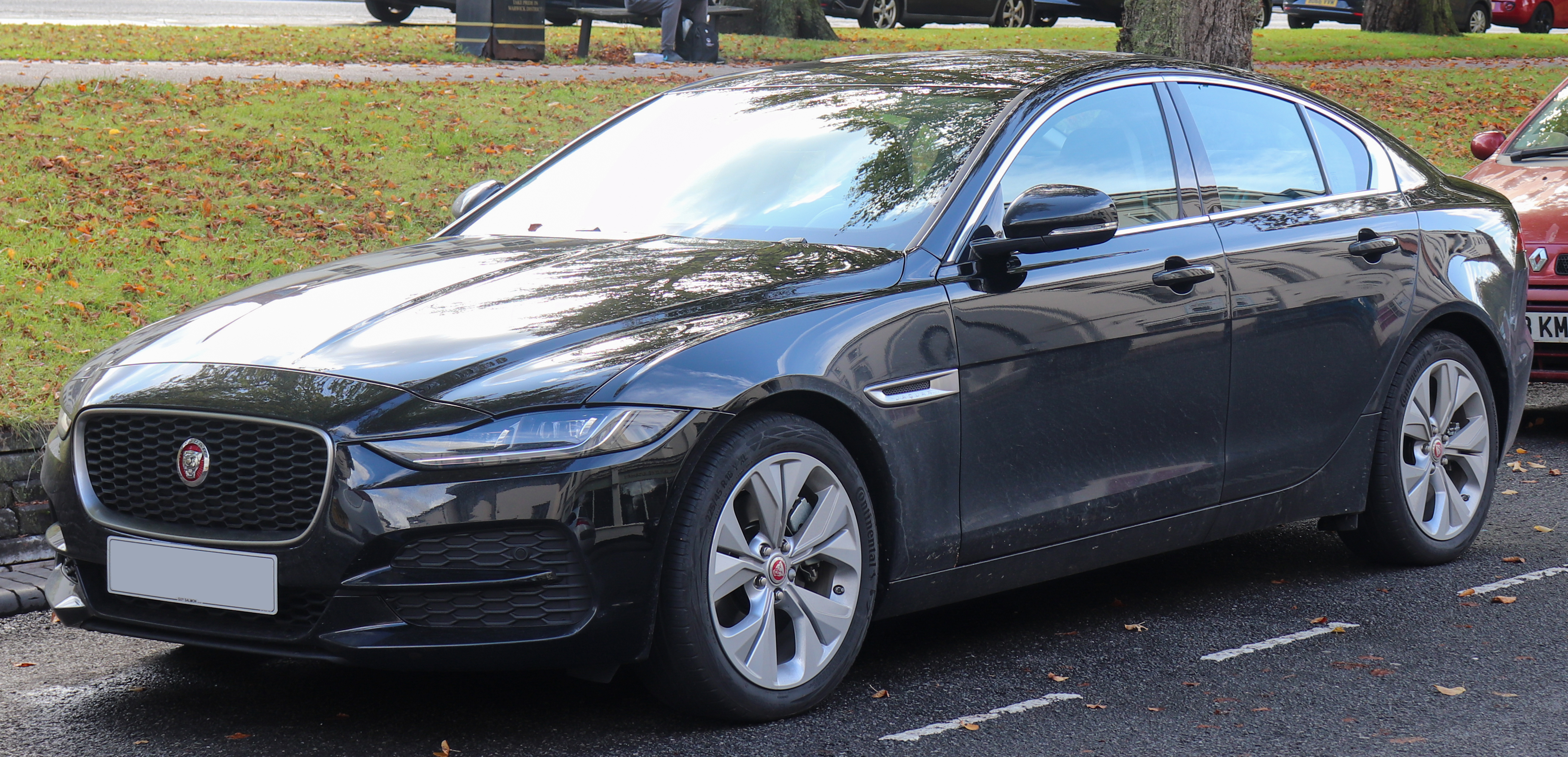
Revised Jaguar XE

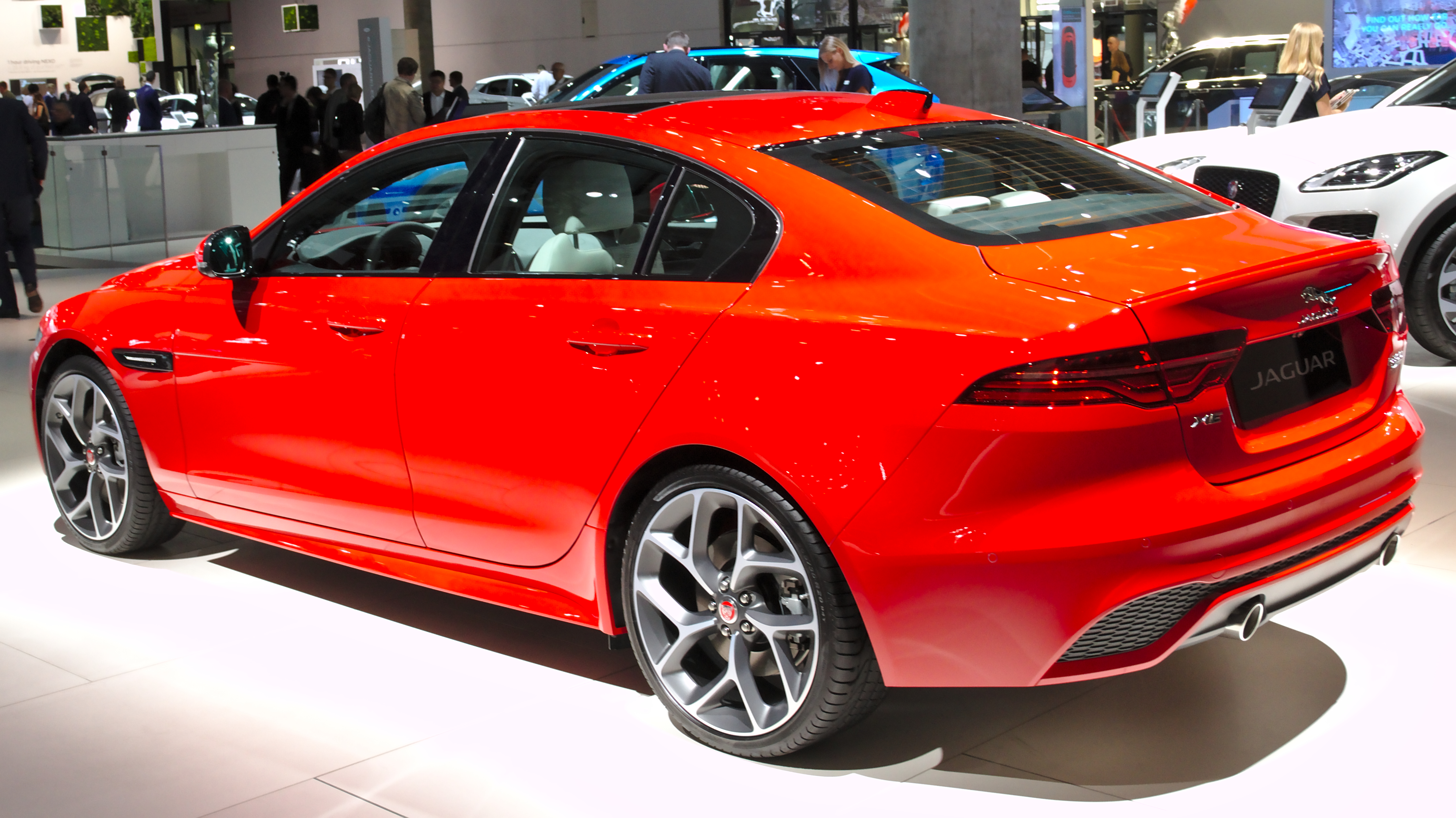
Revised XE at IAA

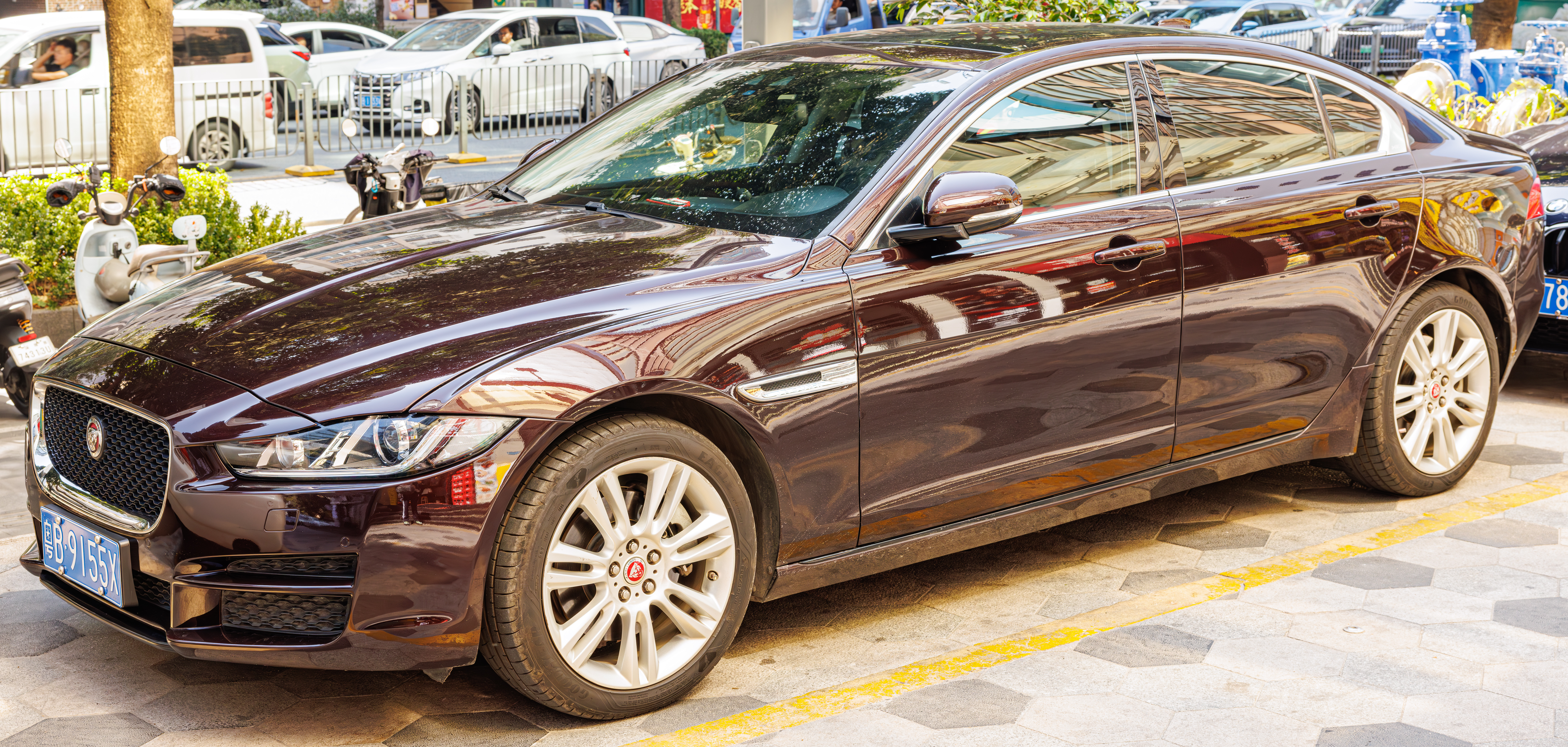
Pre-facelift long wheelbase XEL (China)

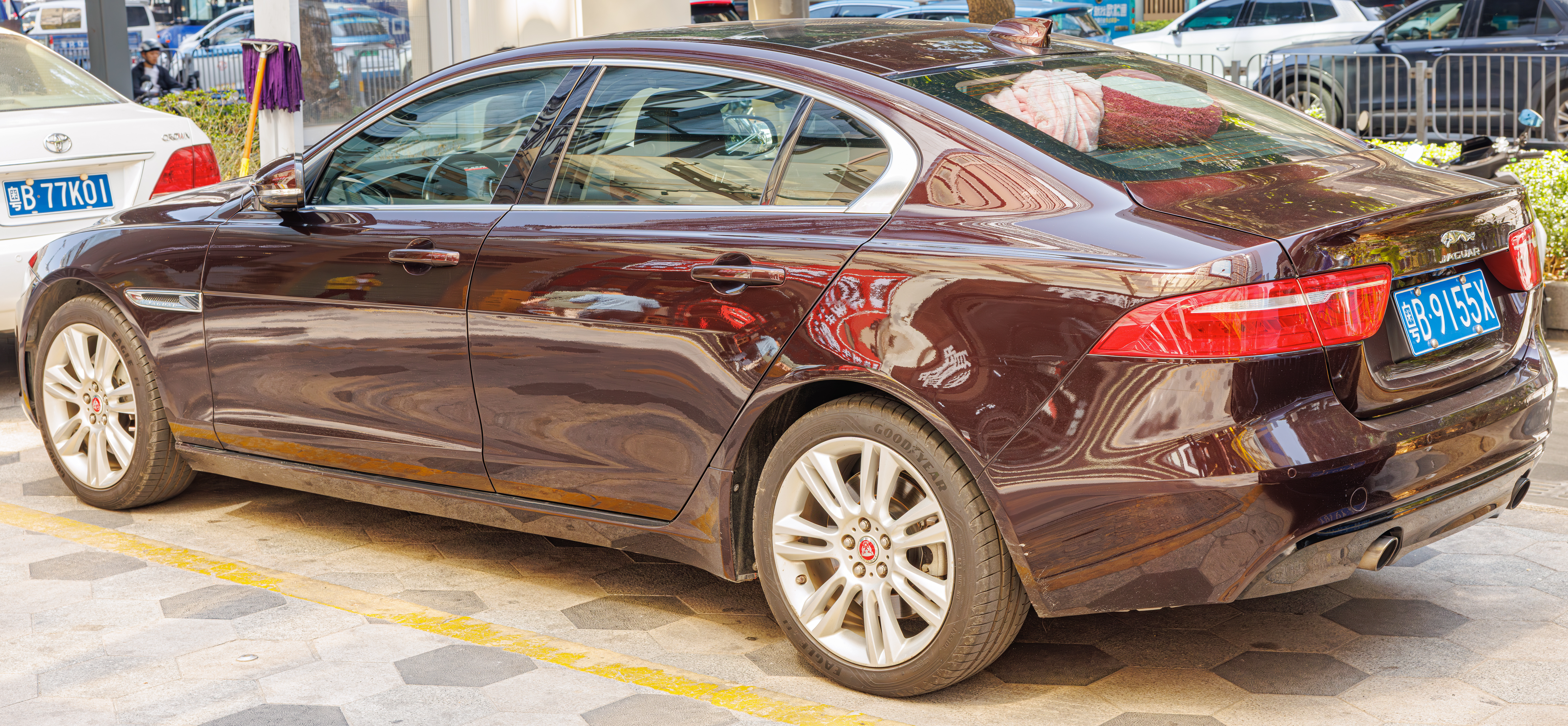
Pre-facelift long wheelbase XEL (China)

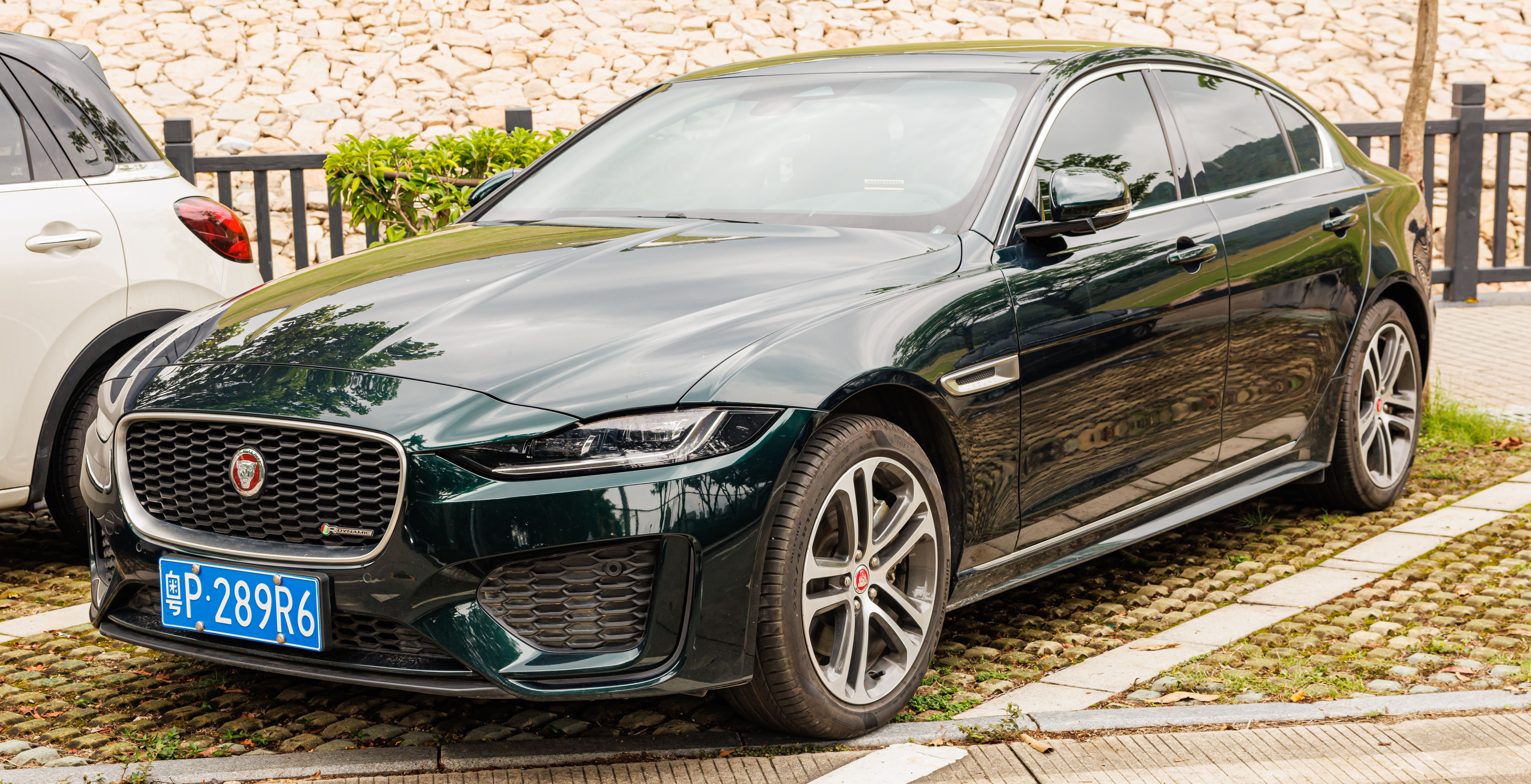
Post-facelift long wheelbase XEL (China)

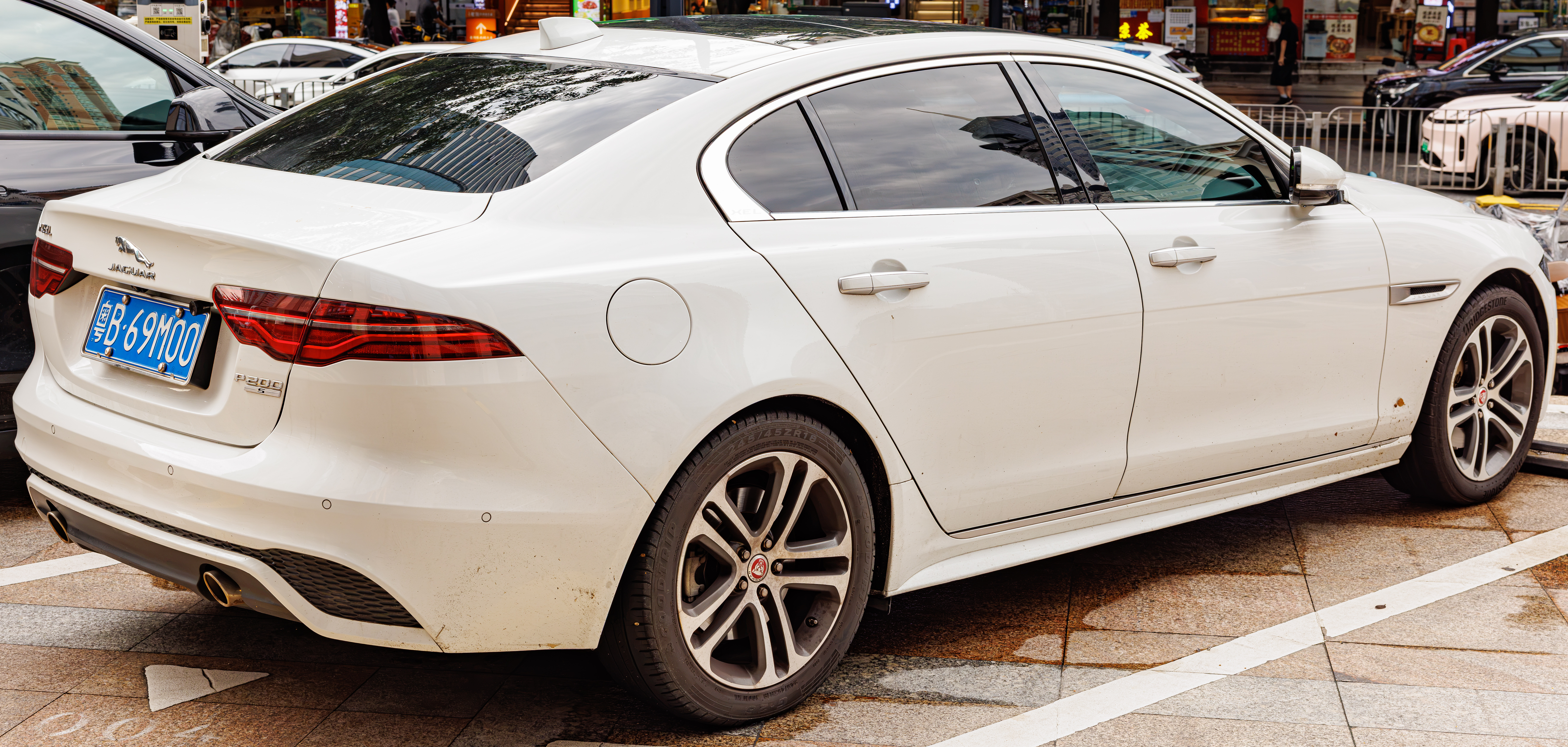
Post-facelift long wheelbase XEL (China)

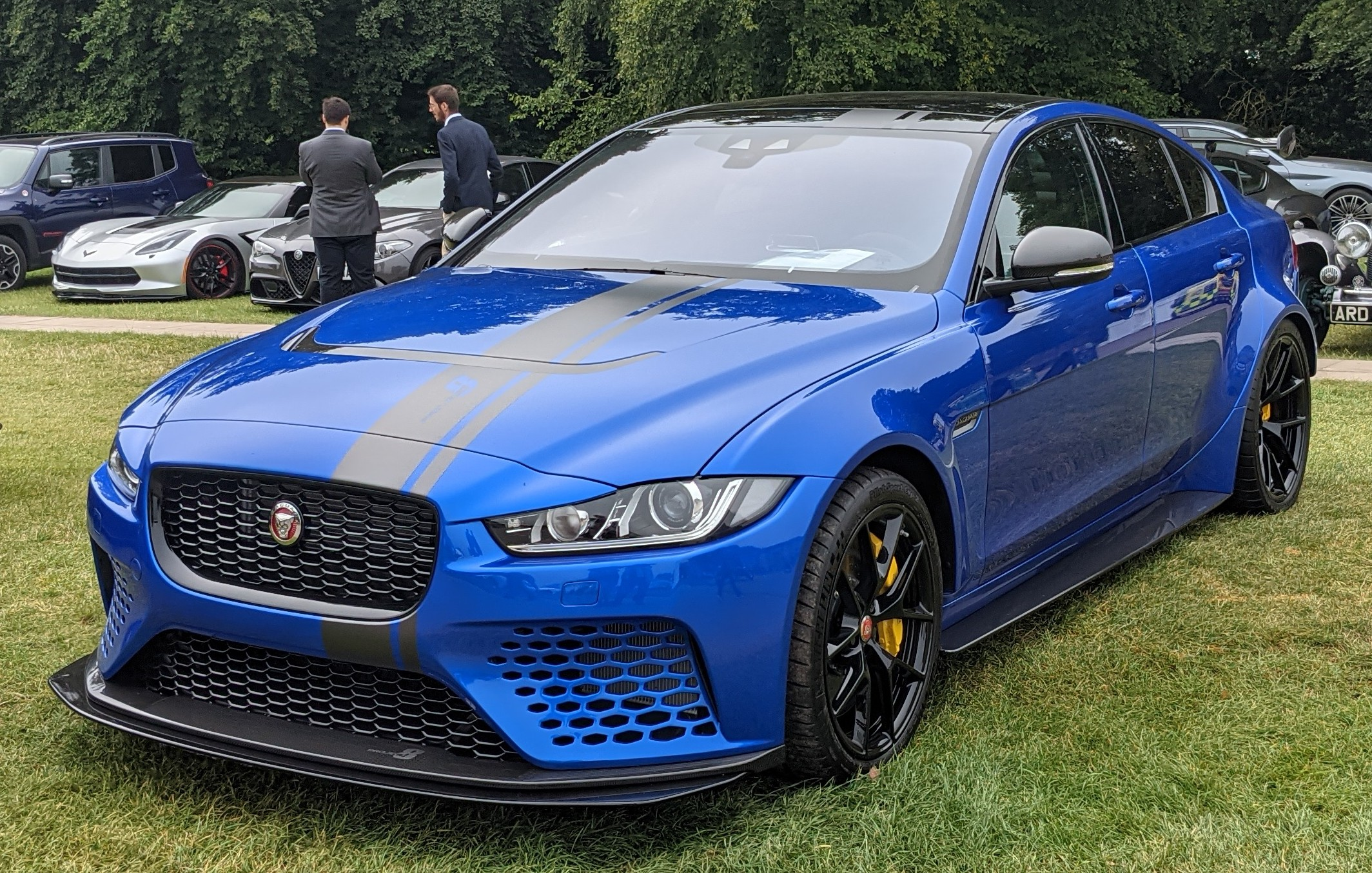
Jaguar XE SV Project 8

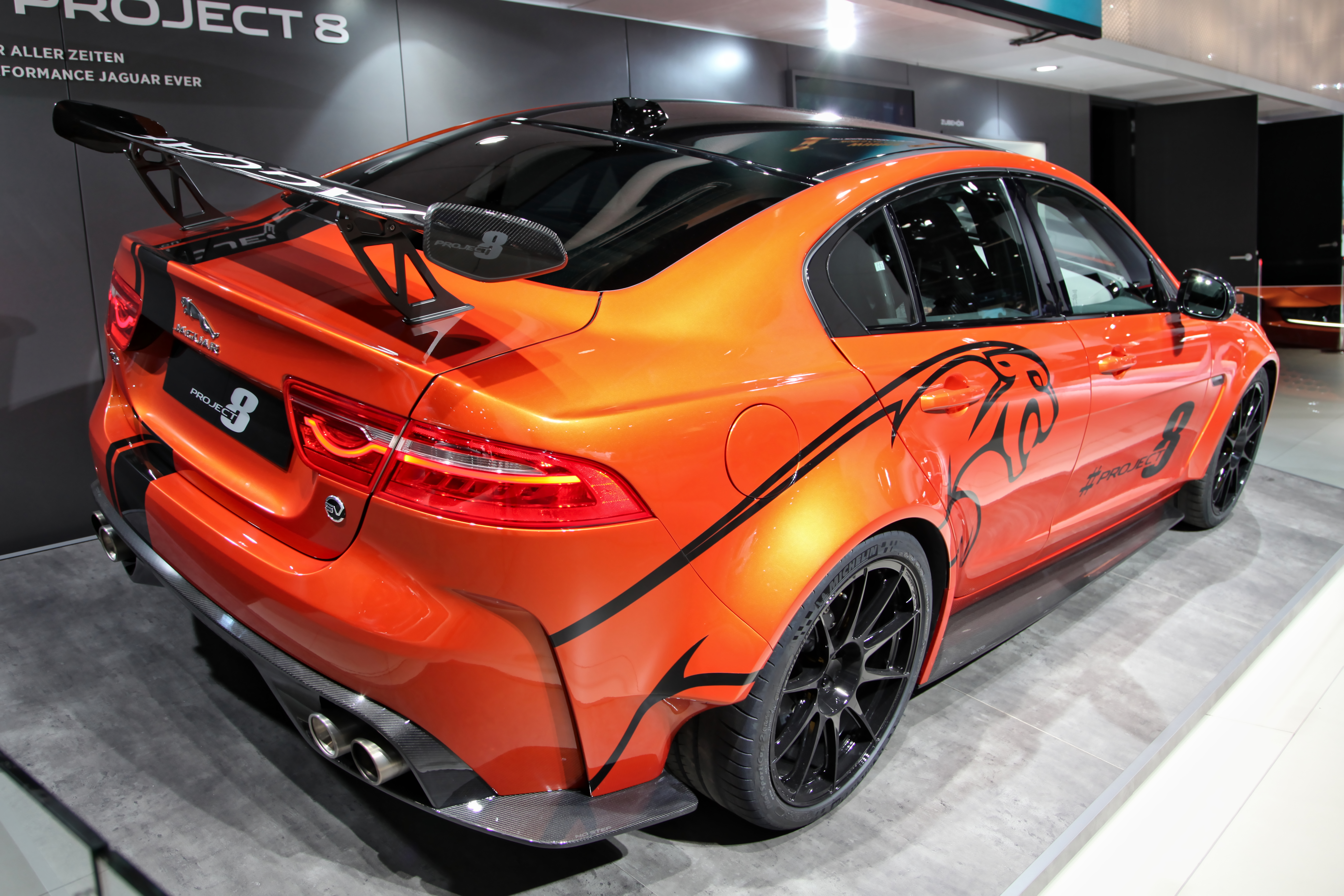
Jaguar XE SV Project 8 (rear)
