= PB Balaji =

Indian business executive

- Born: Pathamadai Balachandran Balaji; 1970 or 1971 (age 54–55)
- Education: IIT Madras; Indian Institute of Management Calcutta
- Title: CEO, Jaguar Land Rover
- Term: November 2025 - present

Pathamadai Balachandran Balaji (born 1970/1971) is an Indian business executive who is the chief financial officer (CFO) of Tata Motors, and the CEO of Jaguar Land Rover (JLR) from November 2025.

Balaji earned a bachelor's degree in mechanical engineering from the Indian Institute of Technology Madras in 1991, and a postgraduate diploma in management from the Indian Institute of Management, Calcutta in 1993.

He began working for Unilever in 1995, rising to senior corporate finance roles in India, Singapore, the UK, and Switzerland. He was the CFO of Hindustan Unilever until 2017.

Since 2017, Balaji has been the CFO of Tata Motors, the parent company of Jaguar Land Rover, and became the CEO of JLR from November 2025, succeeding Adrian Mardell who was retiring after three years in the role.

Balaji is married, and enjoys cooking.
