= Compact executive car =

Car classification

A compact executive car, also known as a compact luxury car, is a premium car larger than a premium compact and smaller than an executive car. Compact executive car is a UK term and a part of the D-segment in the European car classification.

An executive car generally needs to be comfortable and well-equipped while also being cheap to run as a company car. They may have performance features and are often viewed as status symbols. A high percentage of the "executive cars" market share consists of corporate-owned cars, or vehicles provided by a firm for the business and sometimes private use by employees.

== Cars related to the term by country ==
=== United States ===
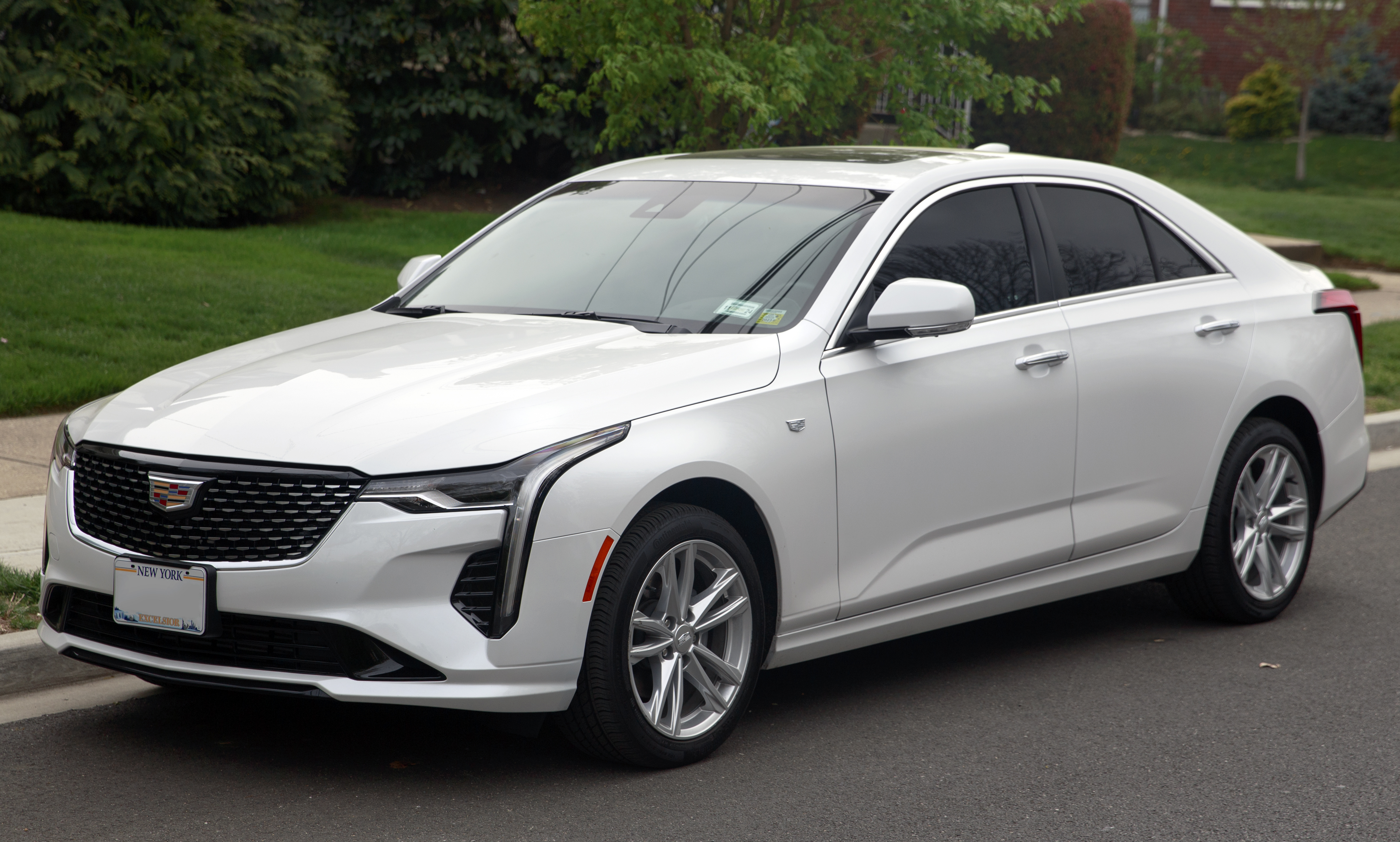
2023 Cadillac CT4

The "compact executive car" description is not often used in the United States, but it describes certain models imported from Europe.

The Cadillac ATS has been described as a compact executive car. The ATS was succeeded by the Cadillac CT4.

Before the ATS, a heavily badge engineered version of the Saab 9-3 was sold in Europe as the Cadillac BLS (2005–2009). The BLS was both developed and manufactured by Saab in Trollhättan, Sweden. The model was never sold in the Northern American market. Cadillac's previous attempt at a compact executive car for the US market was the Cimarron manufactured in between 1981 and 1988. The Cimarron is largely considered to be a market failure and also at least partially responsible for the market struggles that Cadillac faced during and after its production.

=== United Kingdom ===
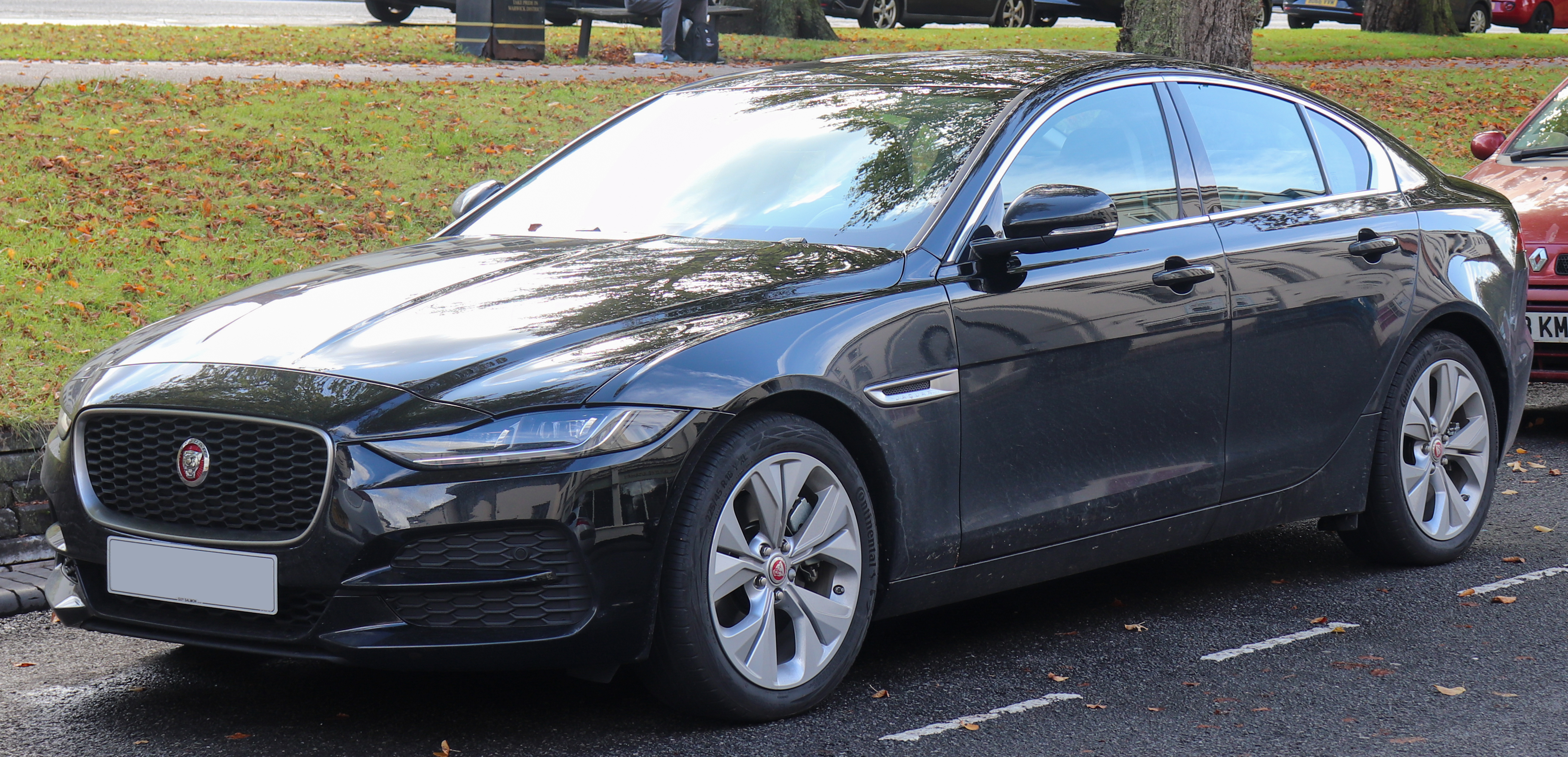
2019 Jaguar XE

The 1971 Triumph Dolomite is an early compact executive car.

Jaguar's first compact executive car (although larger than the 1960s' Jaguar Mark 2) was the 2001 Jaguar X-Type. Sales, however, were disappointing. The X-type was replaced by the Jaguar XE in 2014, competing in the same sector.

=== Italy ===
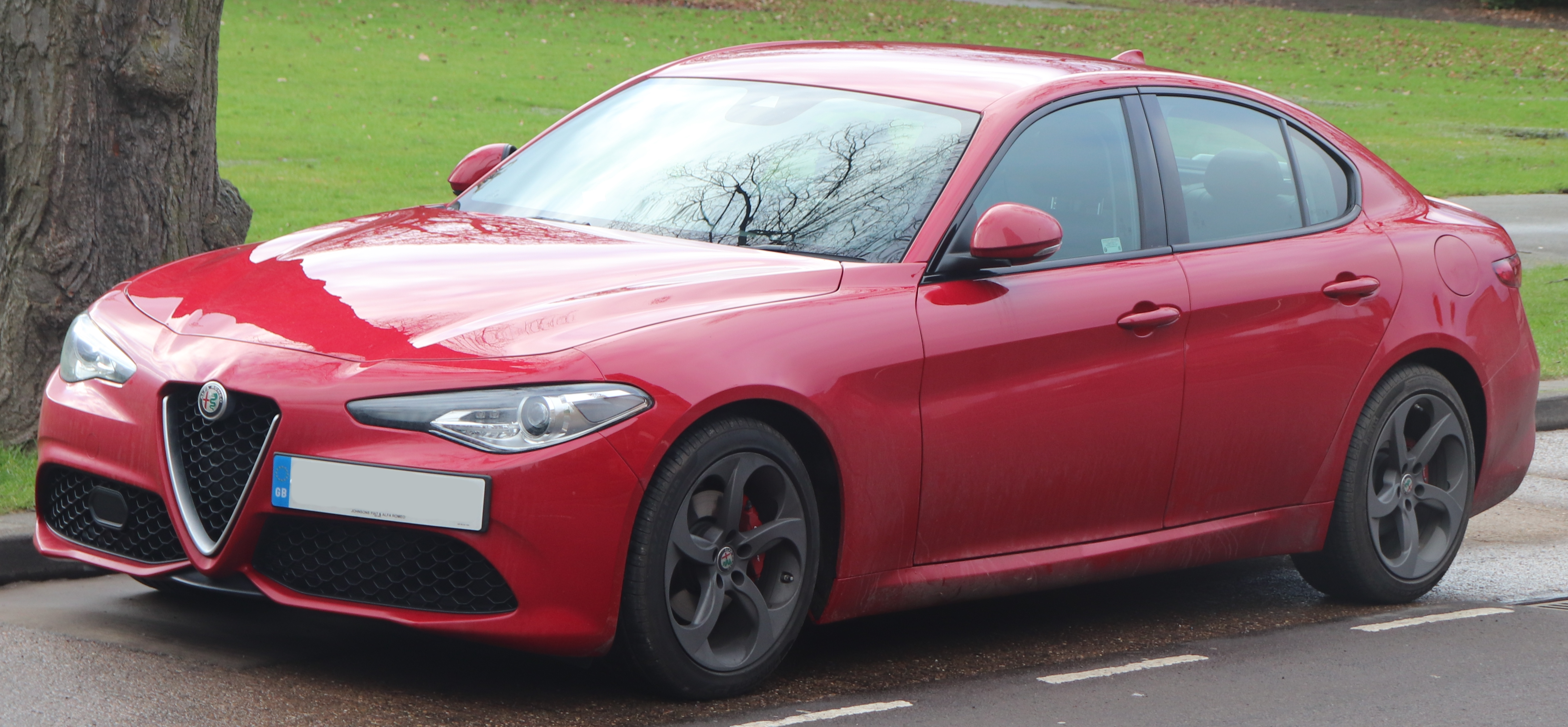
2017 Alfa Romeo Giulia

Alfa Romeo's models 75 and 155 are considered compact executive cars in the United Kingdom. The 1996 Alfa Romeo 156 has been classified as such. This was followed by the Alfa Romeo 159 and then the Giulia (Type 952).

An early compact executive car from Lancia is the 1972 Lancia Beta (Type 828). The Beta morphed into the Lancia Trevi, which was produced from 1980 to 1984. Following an absence from the segment for five years, Lancia returned in 1989 when the Lancia Dedra replaced the smaller Lancia Prisma. The Dedra was replaced by the Lancia Lybra, which was produced from 1998 to 2005.

=== Germany ===
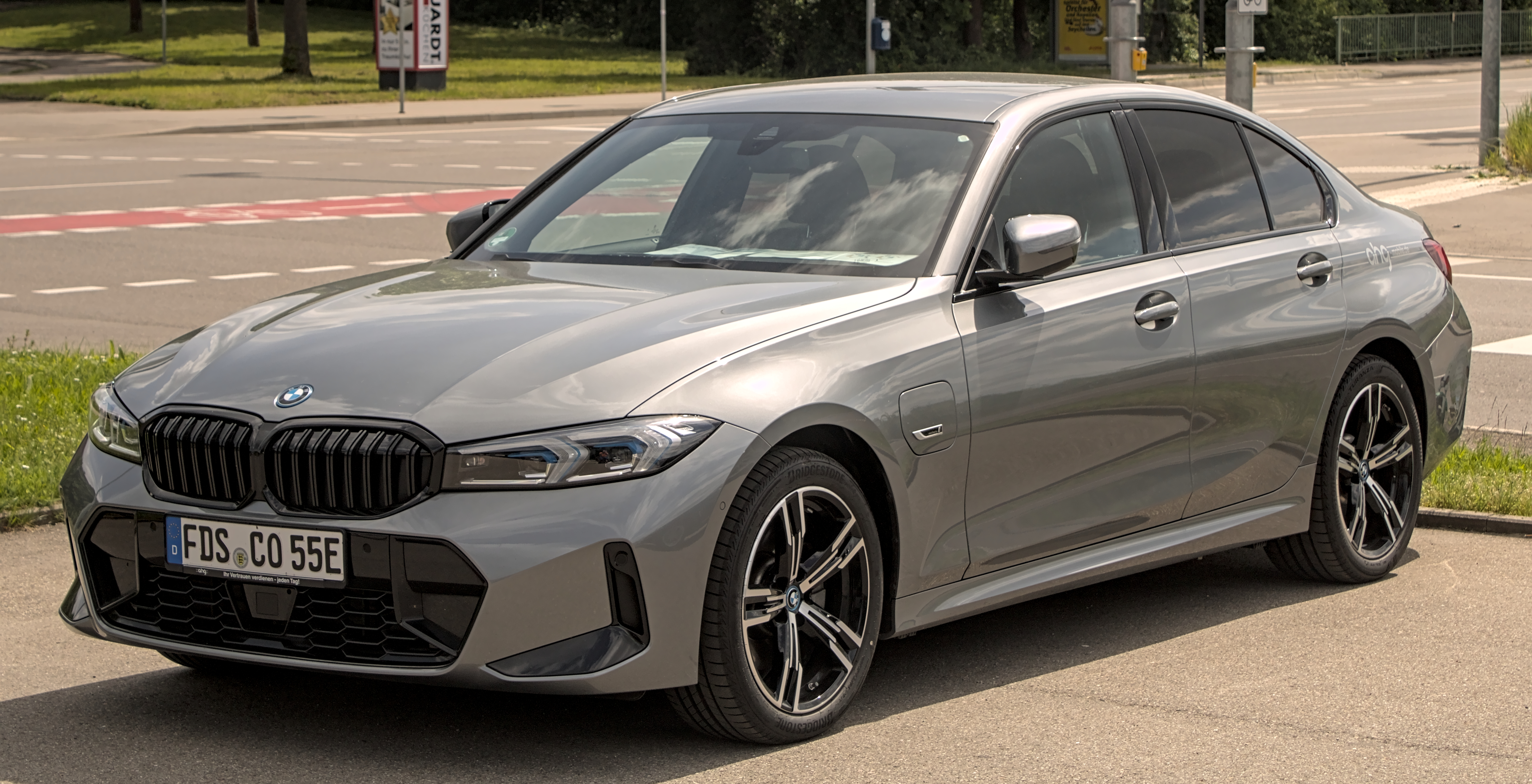
2022 BMW 3 Series

An early compact executive car produced in Germany was the 1966 BMW 02 Series, followed by the BMW 3 Series in 1975.

In 1965 Audi introduced their first compact executive model Audi 72.

The 1983 Mercedes-Benz W201 range (also known as the "Mercedes-Benz 190") was the first compact executive car from Mercedes-Benz. In 1993, the W201 was replaced by the Mercedes-Benz C-Class range.

=== France ===
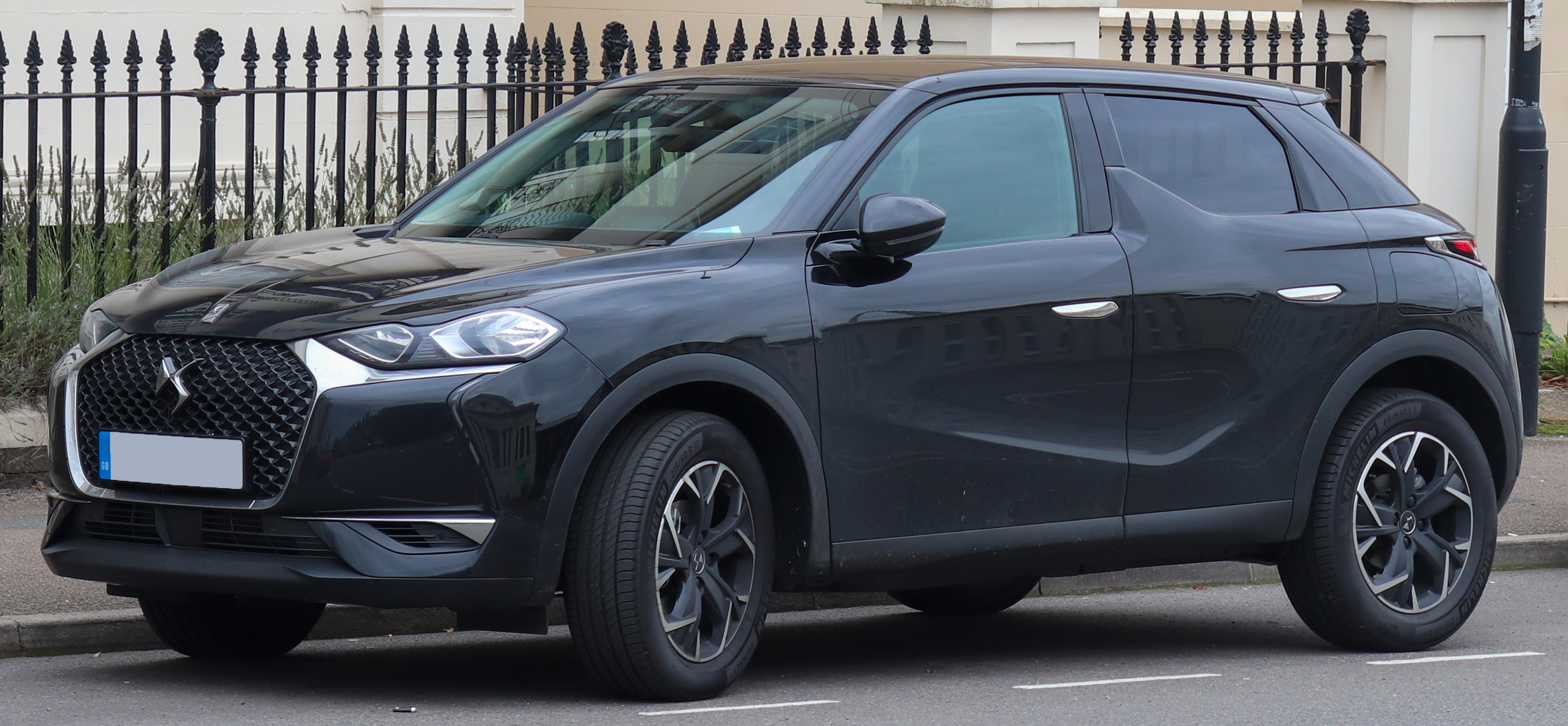
2019 DS 3

DS Automobiles offers a compact executive with its DS 4 hatchback. From earlier models also the larger DS 5 (sold until 2018) could be considered a compact executive car. The DS brand used to be a sub-marque of Citroën, and thus earlier model years (before 2015 for the DS 4 and DS 5, but the change depends on the model) carry the Citroën logo. The smallest model offered by DS has been the DS 3 (sold until 2019), which could be considered to be a subcompact or even supermini executive car. The current DS 3 Crossback differs from the earlier model substantially, as it is a small crossover SUV.

=== Sweden ===
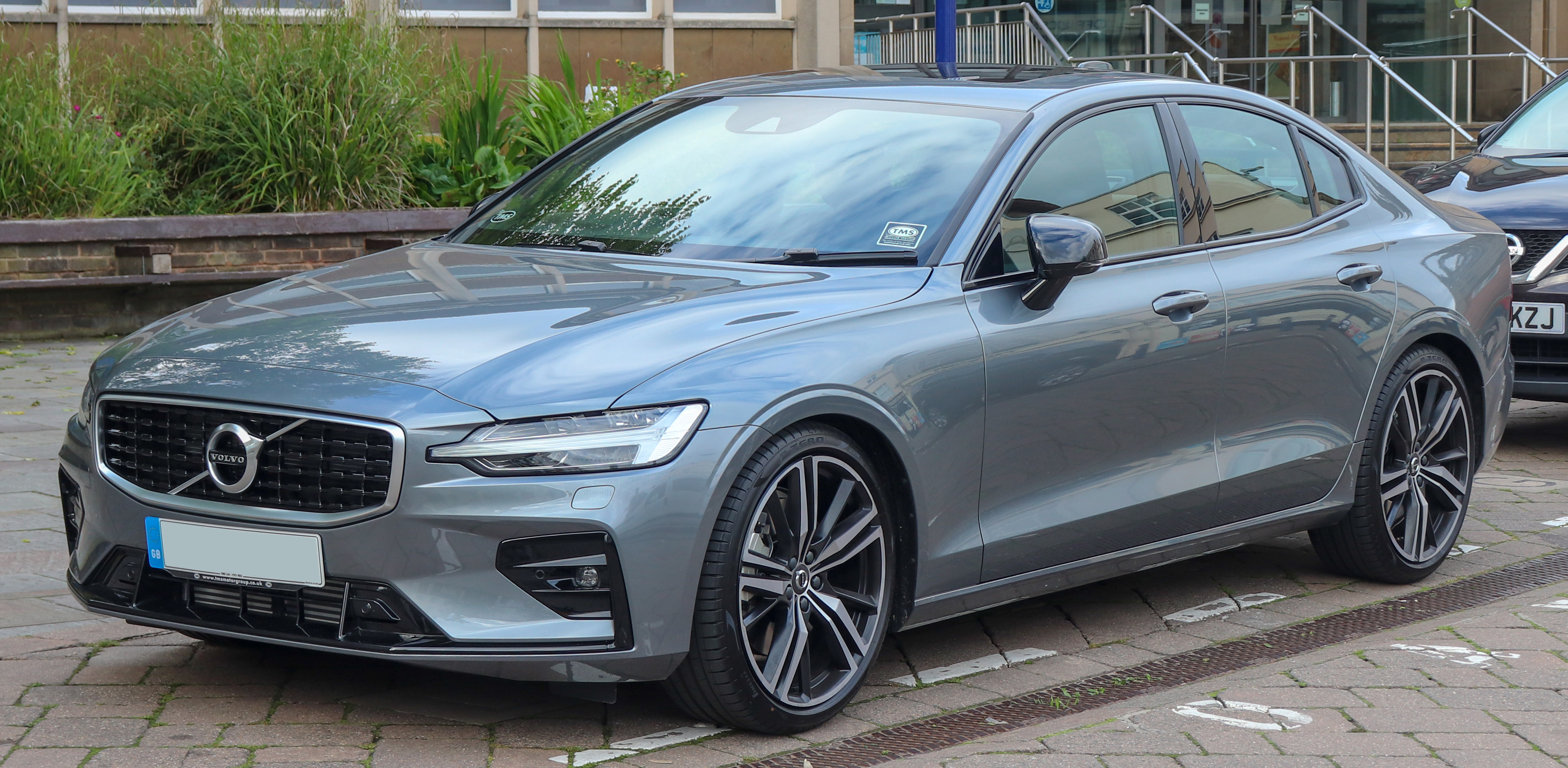
2024 Volvo S60

The Volvo S60 as well as its estate version Volvo V60 are considered to be compact executive cars.

Saab Automobile, which went defunct in 2011, had the 9-3 -model which was a compact executive car. Based on heavily modified GM engines and platforms, the 9-3 was available as a convertible, hatchback (first generation), sedan (second generation) and station wagon (second generation). The 9-3 had a wide variety of both petrol and diesel engine options. Most of the petrol engines were turbocharged and supported the use of ethanol fuel, which were both relatively uncommon features for a mass production car in the 2000s. The 9-3 also had high emphasis on car safety, which was a high priority in the design of all Saab cars. Also the previous Saab 99 and Saab 900 could be considered as compact executive cars at some markets, while especially in Northern Europe these models were more commonly seen as ordinary small family cars.

=== Japan ===
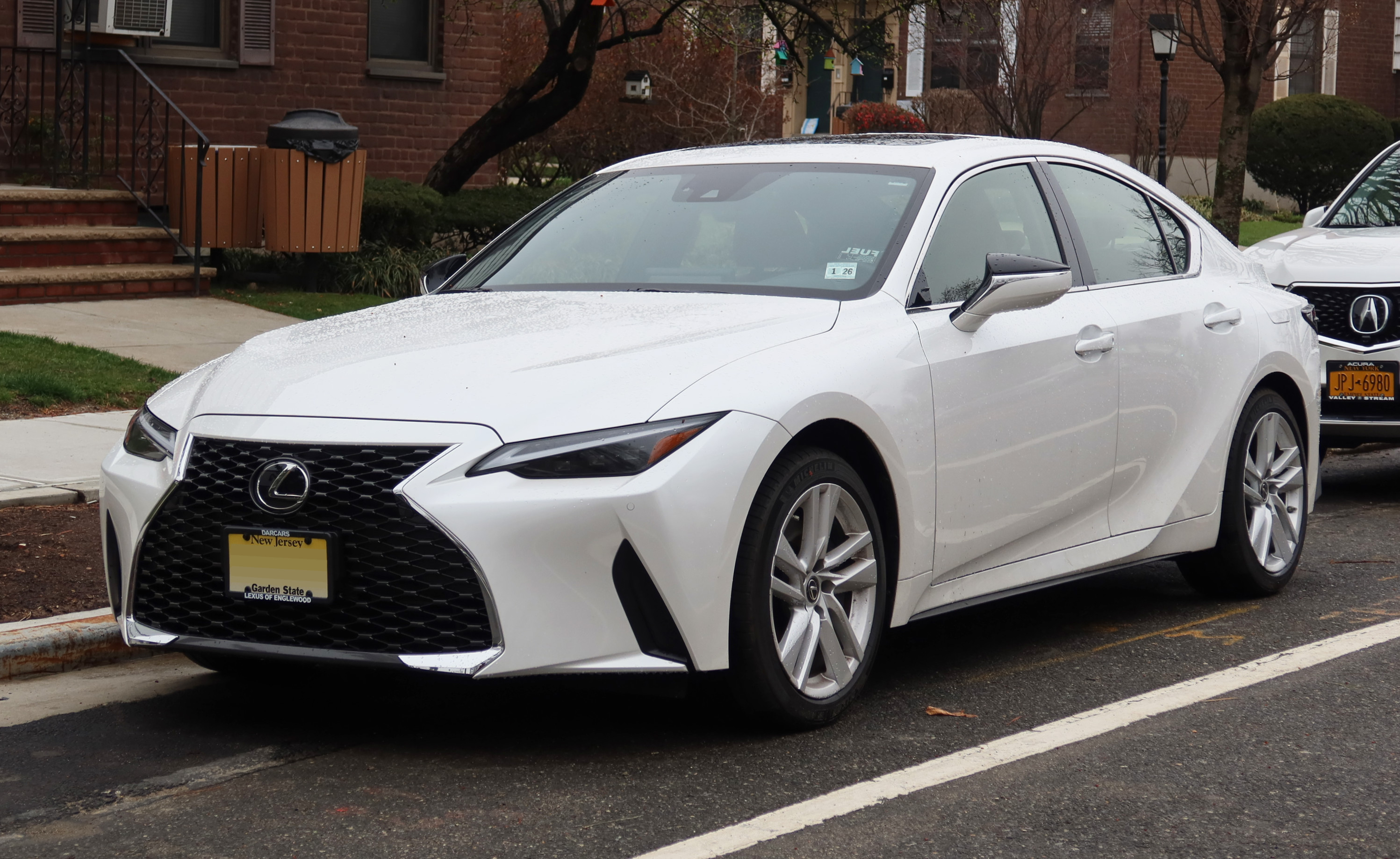
2021 Lexus IS

An early compact executive car produced in Japan was the 1988 Mazda Persona / Eunos 300. The first Japanese compact executive car to be successful in overseas markets is the 1998 Lexus IS / Toyota Altezza.

Other Japanese compact executive cars include the Infiniti Q50 (by Nissan), Acura TLX (by Honda) and Mazda Xedos 6.

=== South Korea ===
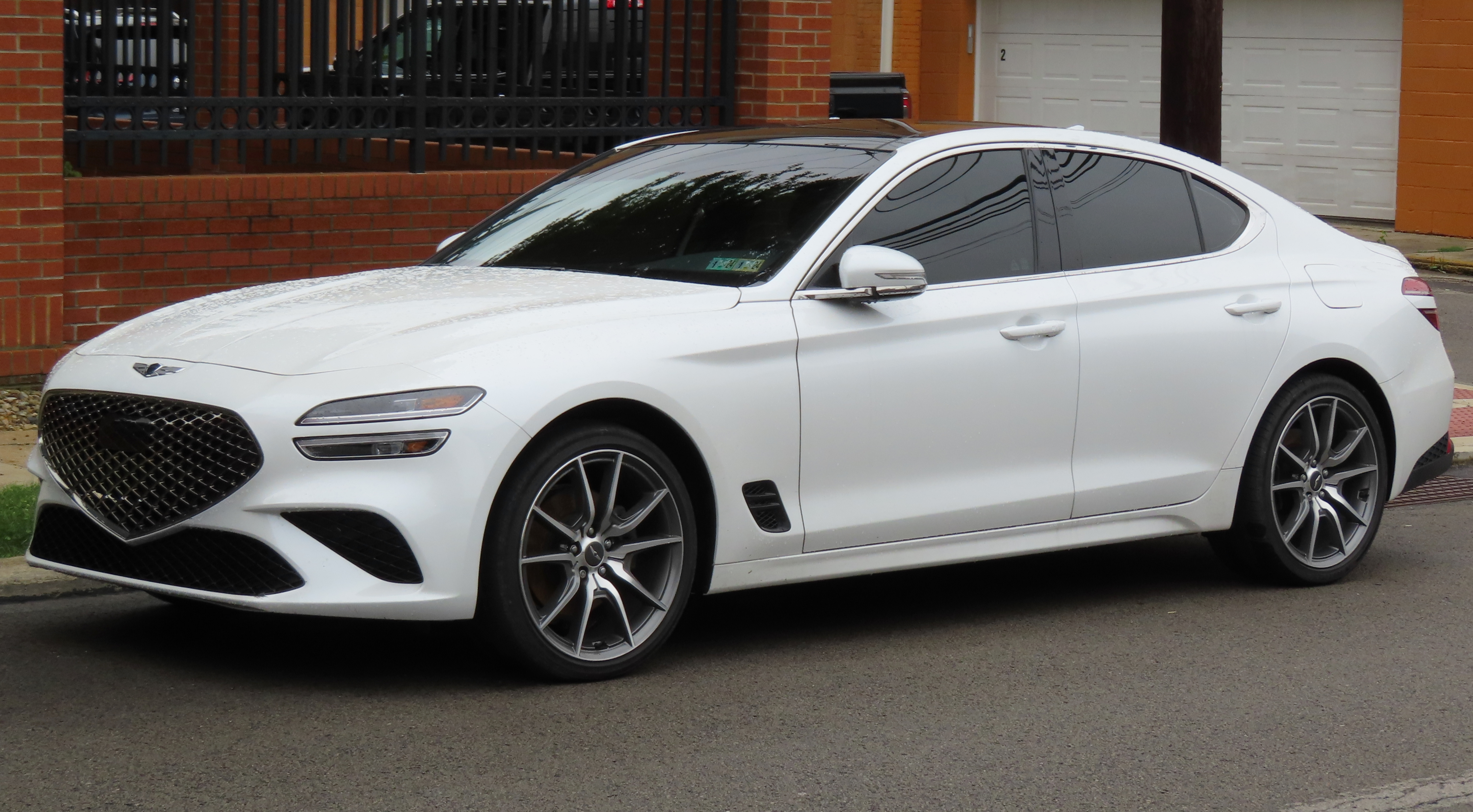
2022 Genesis G70

Compact executive cars produced in South Korea include the Genesis G70.

== Subcompact executive cars ==
Subcompact executive cars, also called premium compacts, is the category of the smallest premium cars. It is part of the C-segment in the European car classification. Examples include the Mercedes-Benz A-Class and CLA-Class, Audi A3, Volvo S40, BMW 1 Series, and 2 Series. Premium compacts compete with well-equipped mid-size cars, and highly optioned premium compact cars can have pricing and features that overlaps with compact executive cars.

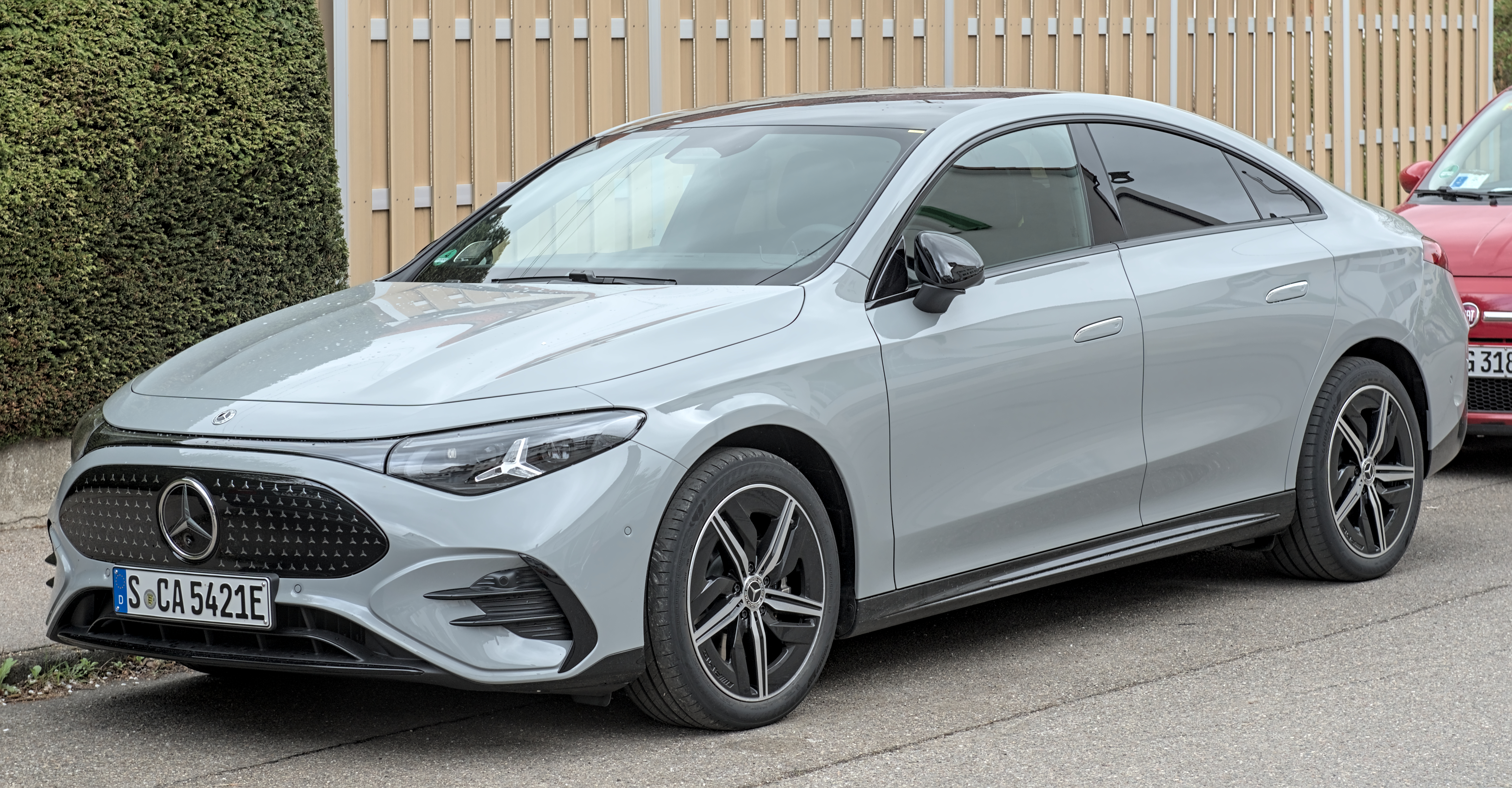
2026 Mercedes-Benz CLA

== See also ==
- Compact car
- Luxury car
- Mid-size car
- Sport compact
- Subcompact car
- Supermini
