= Jaguar Type 01 =

Electric full-size luxury car

Overview
- Manufacturer: Jaguar Land Rover
- Production: 2027 (to commence)
- Model years: 2028
- Assembly: United Kingdom: Solihull (Solihull plant)
- Designer: Gerry McGovern (design chief); Tom Holden (interior design chief)

Body and chassis
- Class: Full-size luxury car
- Body style: 5-door liftback saloon
- Layout: Tri-motor, all-wheel-drive
- Platform: Jaguar Electric Architecture (JEA)

Powertrain
- Electric motor: 3× (1 front and 2 rear)
- Power output: 757 kW (1,015 hp; 1,029 PS)
- Battery: 118-kWh, 850 V
- Range: 720 km (450 mi) (WLTP); 400 mi (640 km) (EPA)
- Plug-in charging: 350 kW DC

Dimensions
- Wheelbase: 3,200 mm (126.0 in)
- Length: 5,235 mm (206.1 in)
- Width: 2,021 mm (79.6 in)
- Height: 1,403 mm (55.2 in)

The Jaguar Type 01 is an upcoming battery electric full-size luxury car manufactured by Jaguar Land Rover under the Jaguar brand. It is Jaguar's first production vehicle after its 2024 rebranding.

== History ==
The Type 01 was originally previewed by the Type 00 concept alongside the marque's rebrand in December 2024, showcasing Jaguar's radical new design language. However, according to Jaguar, the design of the Type 01 was finalised before the Type 00 was revealed.

== Overview ==
The production version of the Type 01 was officially and fully revealed on 6 October 2026.

=== Design ===
Rear view

The Type 01 features a radical design language inspired by Renaissance-era architecture, with sharp creases and large, expansive surfaces. Its proportions have been compared to typical full size cars such as the Jaguar E-Type, with a long hood, a tapered fastback profile, and an exceptionally long dash-to-axle, which Jaguar refers to as the "luxury gap". It features Jaguar's new logo and wordscript. A "strikethrough" design motif is present throughout the vehicle, most prominent in the grille-like panel in the front and in the rear, which also houses full-width taillights that are invisible until turned on. Another key element is the 3 m (120 in) long "impossible panel", a body panel that extends from above the A-pillar to the entirety of the rear fender and required 1,500 hours to develop. Similar to the Type 00, it forgoes its rear window. Each of its headlights contain 20,000 HD projector LEDs. Wheel sizes range from 21 to 23 inches. A rear spoiler mounted on the tailgate can raise to 7 degrees to reduce drag and 21 degrees to generate up to 75 kg (165 lb) downforce. Its drag coefficient is 0.23 Cd.

Its interior features a similarly minimalistic design, prominently featuring a "spine" running through the length of the cabin, upholstered in either leather or a combination neograin ultrafabric and Kvadrat's duoweave, with a choice of three colour schemes. It is marketed as a 2+2 seater rather than a 4 seater, with multiple sources citing its relative lack of rear seat space. A main 24-inch OLED touchscreen sits on the dashboard, while there is another 7.0-inch vertically oriented display in both rows used for climate and seat control functions. A soundbar located above the dashboard houses 13 of 23 speakers by Meridian audio, 6 woofers, as well as a small display that functions as a rear-view mirror. Additional noise-canceling units are positioned with the headrests of the seats. All seats are heated and cooled. Its boot capacity ranges from 450 L (16 cu ft) to 1,000 L (35 cu ft) after its rear seats are folded.

It equipped with standard rear wheel steering of up to 6 degrees, air suspension with adaptive dampers, and has a balanced 50:50 weight distribution. Furthermore, Jaguar claims that its aluminium body has a stiffness of 57,000 Nm per degree.

=== Platform ===
The Type 01 is built on the Jaguar Electric Architecture (JEA), which is a completely new and bespoke platform only intended for Jaguar vehicles. The Type 01 will also not share any components with other vehicles within the JLR group. Due to its unusually stretched proportions for an EV, Jaguar has packaged 32 out of 200 battery cells as well as some electronic hardware into the long hood and dash-to-axle, allowing the under-floor section of the battery to be reduced to 150 mm (5.9 in) deep. To further support safety, aluminium structures known as "tri-axis nodes" located in the outer parts of the bulkhead ahead of the powertrain systems.

== Powertrain ==
The Type 01 sits on an 850-volt architecture. It uses a triple-motor configuration with one front-mounted and two rear-mounted motors, producing a combined 1,015 hp (757 kW; 1,029 PS) and 1,007 lb⋅ft (1,365 N⋅m) of torque. It can accelerate from 0 to 62 mph (100 km/h) in 3.2 seconds and from 62 to 112 mph (180 km/h) in 4.0 seconds. It uses a 118 kWh battery with an estimated range of 450 mi (720 km). It can charge using both 400 and 800-volt chargers, completing a 10–80% charge in approximately 22 minutes.
