= National Automotive Innovation Centre =

English research centre

Coordinates: 52.3843°N 1.5632°W

The National Automotive Innovation Centre (NAIC), sometimes referred to as the National Automotive Innovation Campus, is a building at the University of Warwick in the United Kingdom. It is a joint venture between the University's WMG, Jaguar Land Rover and Tata Motors. The building was opened by The Prince of Wales on 18 February 2020.

== History ==
The NAIC will be a focus for automotive research, combining expertise from industry, university academics and supply chain companies. It is intended to support advances in technology to reduce dependency on fossil fuels and vehicle emissions. The £150 million project is funded by a range of partners: £50 million of the project funding is being provided by the University of Warwick's development partners, Jaguar Land Rover, with additional funding from WMG and Tata Motors European Technical Centre. The remaining £15 million is from the government's Higher Education Funding Council for England.

The four-storey building, designed by Cullinan Studio, will have a total floorspace of 33,964 square metres. It is estimated that around 1,060 people will be employed at the site. Facilities in the building are expected to include research and development facilities, an engineering hall, a virtual reality lab, design workshops, teaching facilities, offices, meeting rooms, library, outdoor car viewing garden, a publicly accessible showroom and café.

Coventry City Council approved the plans on 26 June 2014. Construction is expected to start in 2014 with the building set to be completed by 2016.

The building is named The Prof. Lord Bhattacharyya Building after Lord Bhattacharyya. It is on the main road of the Warwick campus, which was renamed Lord Bhattacharyya Way in 2018.
