= Jaguar Land Rover Slovakia =

Slovakian subsidiary of Jaguar Land Rover

Coordinates: 48°20′43″N 18°02′45″E

Jaguar Land Rover Slovakia s.r.o.
- Company type: subsidiary
- Industry: automotive
- Founded: 14 November 2015; 10 years ago in Bratislava, Slovakia
- Founder: Jaguar Land Rover
- Headquarters: Bratislava, Slovakia
- Parent: Jaguar Land Rover Holdings
- Website: www.jaguarlandrover.sk

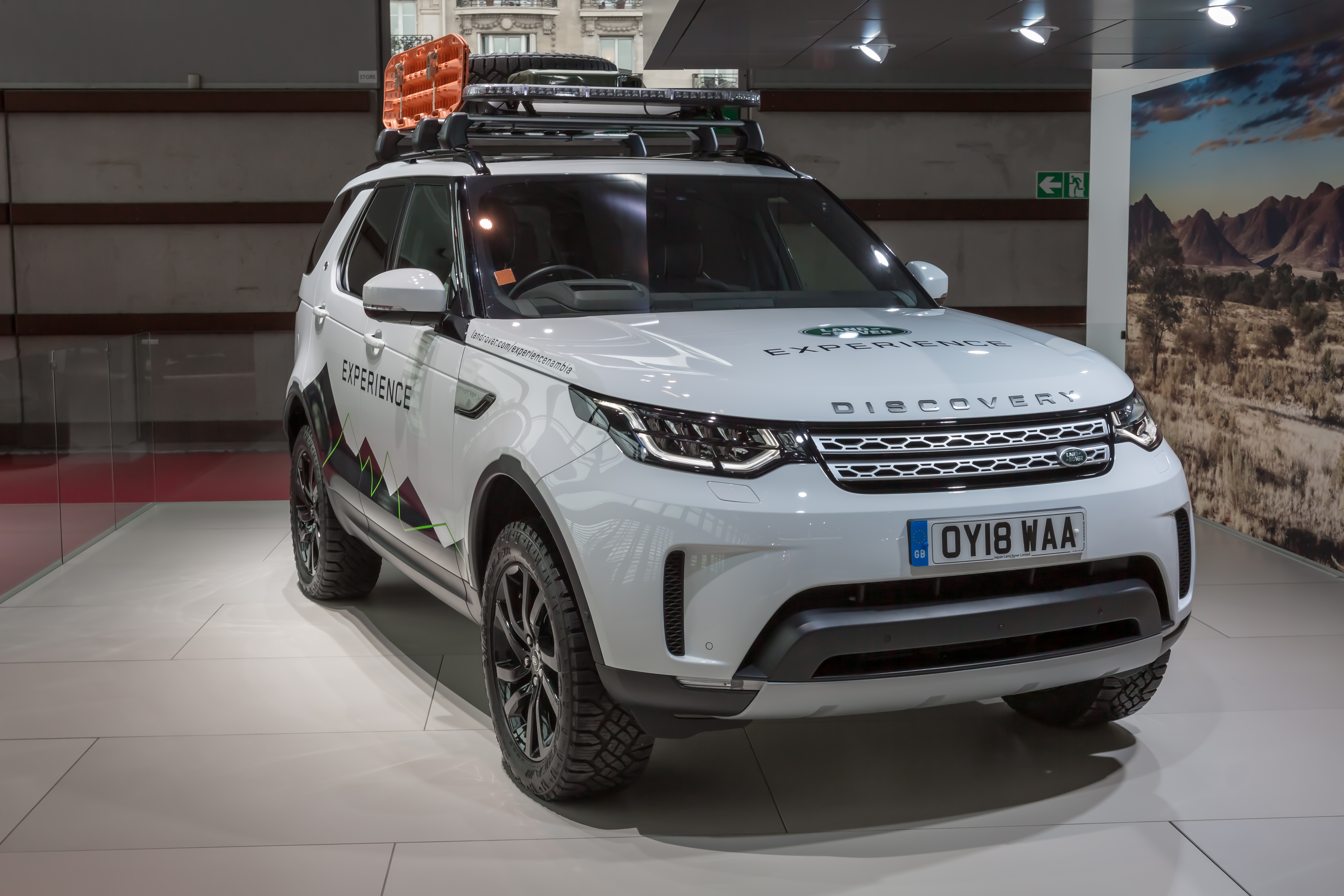
Land Rover Discovery at the Paris Motor Show 2018

Jaguar Land Rover Slovakia is a Slovak subsidiary of the British car producer Jaguar Land Rover, itself a subsidiary of Tata Motors. The factory is located in Nitra and production started in October 2018. It builds the Land Rover Discovery and Land Rover Defender models.

== Nitra plant ==
The basic facts:

- the €1.4bn (£1bn) manufacturing facility in Nitra was opened on 25 October 2018
- from about 1500 employees 30 per cent are women
- all manufacturing employees are educated in the new Training Academy for 12 weeks
- the facility area is about 300,000 square meters and the planned annual capacity is 150,000 vehicles
- as the first in Europe the plant uses Kuka's Pulse carrier system with over 30 per cent faster transfer times.
