= Land Rover Defender (L663) =

Land Rover Defender model

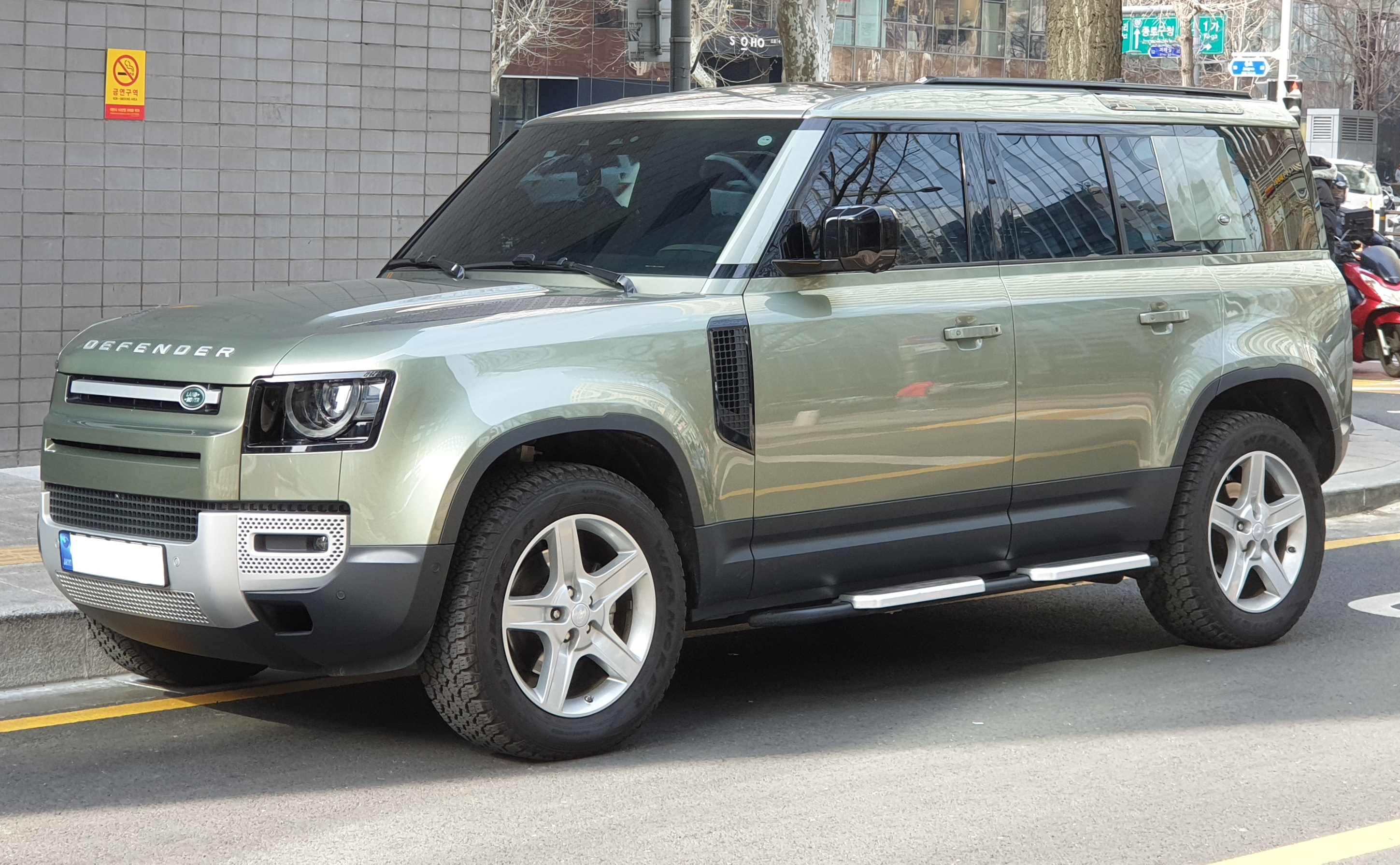
- Land Rover Defender 110

Overview
- Manufacturer: Jaguar Land Rover
- Production: 2019–present
- Model years: 2020–present
- Assembly: Slovakia: Nitra (JLR Slovakia); India: Pune (JLR India)
- Designer: Gerry McGovern

Body and chassis
- Class: Compact luxury 4x4 (90); Mid-size luxury 4x4 (110); Full-size luxury 4x4 (130)
- Body style: 3-door SUV (90); 5-door SUV (110 & 130)
- Layout: Front-engine, four-wheel-drive
- Platform: D7x
- Chassis: Uniframe

Powertrain
- Engine: Petrol: 2.0 L P300 AJ200 turbo I4; 2.0 L P400e AJ200 turbo PHEV I4; 3.0 L P400 AJ300 turbo MHEV I6; 4.4 L BMW S68B44T0 twin-turbo V8 (OCTA); 5.0 L AJ133 SC V8; Diesel: 2.0 L D200/240 AJ200D turbo I4; 3.0 L D200/250/300 AJ300D turbo MHEV I6
- Electric motor: 85 kW (116 PS; 114 hp) Permanent Magnet Synchronous Motor (P400e PHEV)
- Transmission: ZF 8-speed automatic; 2-speed transfer case
- Hybrid drivetrain: Mild hybrid (P400); Plug-in hybrid (P400e)
- Battery: 13.1 kWh lithium-ion (PHEV)

Dimensions
- Wheelbase: 90: 2,587 mm (101.9 in); 110 & 130: 3,022 mm (119.0 in)
- Length: 90: 4,323–4,583 mm (170.2–180.4 in); 110: 4,758–5,018 mm (187.3–197.6 in); 130: 5,170–5,358 mm (203.5–210.9 in)
- Width: 2,008 mm (79.1 in) (with folded mirrors)
- Height: 90 (air susp): 1,974 mm (77.7 in); 90 (coil susp): 1,969 mm (77.5 in); 110: 1,967 mm (77.4 in)
- Kerb weight: 4,912–5,946 lb (2,228–2,697 kg)

Chronology
- Predecessor: Land Rover Defender (L316)

The Land Rover Defender is a four-wheel-drive off-road luxury 4x4 from British automotive company Jaguar Land Rover. The vehicle was launched on 10 September 2019 at the Frankfurt Motor Show. It is significant for being the first all-new version of the Defender, breaking the engineering lineage with its predecessor, a descendant of the original Series Land Rovers of 1948. The unibody-based Defender is aimed at a more upmarket segment than its predecessor.

The L663 Defender is available in three body length options, marketed as the Defender 90 (3-door), Defender 110 (5-door) and Defender 130 (5-door with extended rear overhang for three-row seating).

== Background ==
The Defender replaces the original Land Rover Defender (1983–2016). The cars are built in Slovakia at Jaguar Land Rover's Nitra plant, a manufacturing facility which opened on 25 October 2018. The plant covers an area of about 300,000 m^{2} (3,200,000 square feet).

The car, which shares no components or technology with its predecessor Defender model, has permanent all-wheel drive, locking differentials in the centre and rear, and a two-speed transfer case. Unlike the previous Defender models, the new model has an aluminium unibody instead of a body-on-frame construction. All Defender 110 variants come with air suspension as standard whilst the 90 can be optioned with coil springs or air suspension. Deliveries to customers of the 5-door Defender 110 began in early 2020, to be followed by the 3-door Defender 90 in late 2020.

=== Reception ===
The Defender has been well received by the motoring press, all reviews underlining that it is significantly different from its chassis-based predecessor: "It’s all very Defender – but not as we know it" declared the Evening Standard; "Born-again off-roader follows a new path and is all the better for it" declared the Motoring website. "Combine (its) seemingly impossible blend of qualities with a fantastic looking package inside and out and you have a vehicle that is literally like no other". A TFL Car review was critical of the quality of the cars, with readers giving accounts of problems within the first few weeks of ownerships and with only up to a few hundred miles of driving. Poor reliability has been a recurring theme with many Land Rover models.

In 2019, Lego announced a 2,573-piece "LEGO Land Rover Defender" set based on the vehicle, released in October 2019. It is one of the largest sets ever made by Lego.

== General characteristics ==
=== Mechanical specifications ===
The Defender 110 is 5,018 mm (197.6 in) long including the spare wheel on the rear door, or 4,758 mm (187.3 in) without it, and has a wheelbase of 3,022 mm (119.0 in). The Defender 90 is 4,583 mm (180.4 in) long including the spare wheel and 4,323 mm (170.2 in) without, with a weight from 2,133 kilograms (4,702 lb) with a 4-cylinder diesel engine.

Defender 90 models with coil spring suspension have a ground clearance of 226 mm (8.9 in) whilst the 110 and the 90 with air suspension have a maximum ground clearance of 291 mm (11.5 in).

The initial engine choice will be from the following JLR Ingenium engines: D200 - a 196 bhp (146 kW) 2.0-litre 4-cylinder turbodiesel, D240 2.0-litre 4-cylinder turbodiesel of 237 bhp (177 kW), P300 2.0-litre 4-cylinder turbo petrol of 296 bhp (221 kW), P400 3.0-litre 6-cylinder turbo petrol mild hybrid of 395 bhp (295 kW) and P400e which is only available for the 110 which makes 398 bhp (297 kW). For the 2021 model year (announced September 2020), the following JLR Ingenium in-line 6-cylinder diesel engines with mild hybrid technology are available: D200, D250, D300.

All variants are fitted with a ZF 8-speed automatic transmission coupled with permanent 4WD and a 2-speed transfer case. The bevel gear centre differential distributes power in a 50/50 ratio. The centre differential can also be manually locked. Base models come with the white steel wheels as standard fitment.

In the US and Canada, the 90 model is only offered in a limited edition First Edition and the 3.0 6 cylinder engine while the 110 is offered in both the limited edition First Edition with 3.0 engine as well as the regular models with both 3.0 or 2.0 engines.

A front mount 4,536-kilogram (10,000 lb) load-rated winch is officially supported whereas most unibody cars do not support winches.

=== Trim levels and interior ===
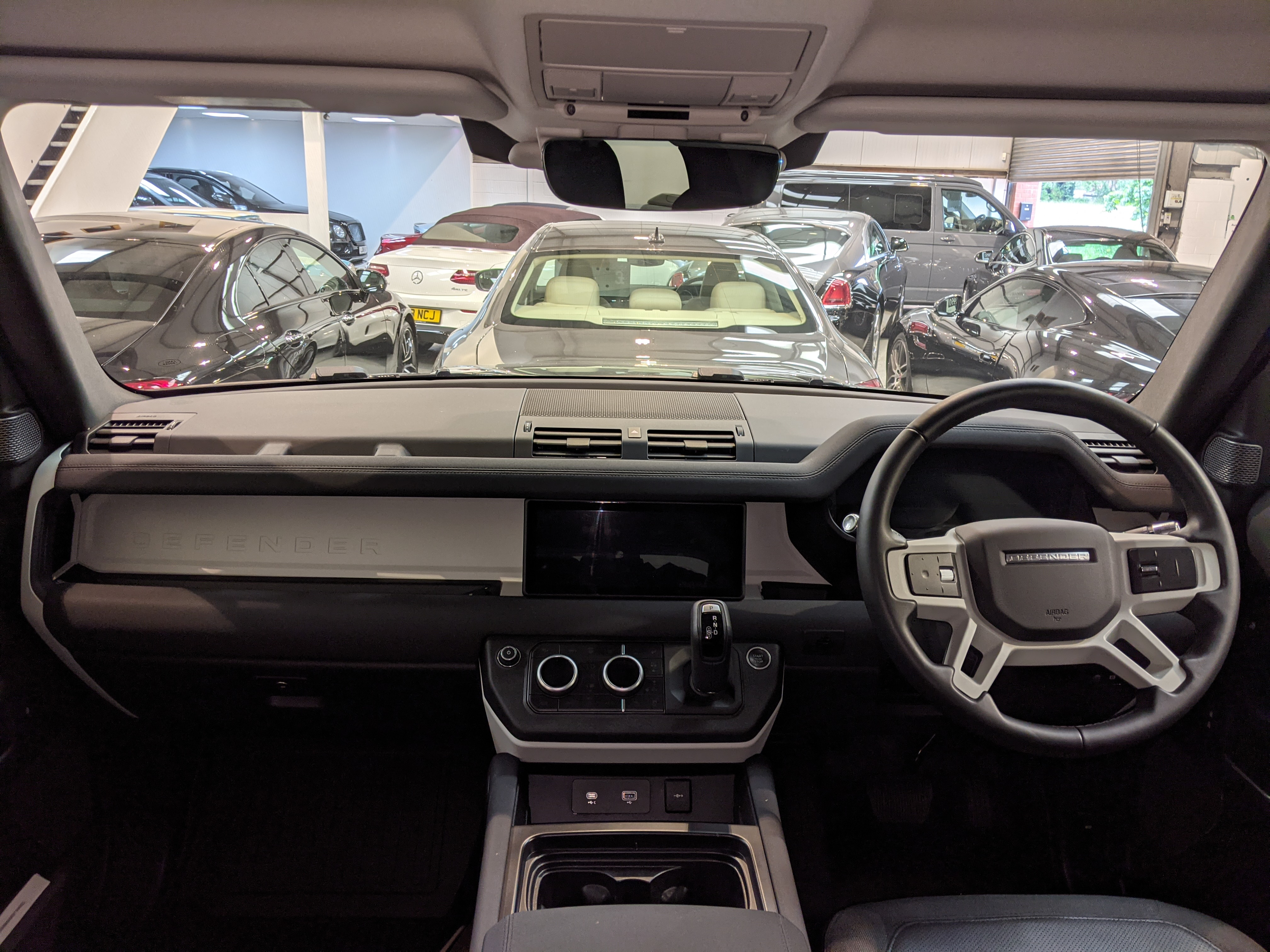
Interior

The Defender is available in Standard, S, SE, XS, HSE, X, V8 and V8 Carpathian Edition trim lines. Land Rover also offers four accessory packs, called Explorer, Adventure, Urban and Country, which include various accessories such as a raised air intake, extended mud flaps, a side-mounted storage box, and more.

The entry-level 110 models will come equipped with air suspension, 18-inch steel wheels, LED headlights, and a 10.0-inch touchscreen infotainment system. The Defender 90 comes with coil springs, a standard front jump seat that adds a third seating position to the front row. Models with front bucket seats can be equipped with a wide centre console. The car debuts Jaguar Land Rover's Pivi Pro infotainment system, accessed through a 10-inch touch screen.

There are also Hard Top or Commercial versions of both the 90 and 110 variants, in a number of different trim levels, available as Euro N1 vehicles, fully VAT deductible, in the UK and other markets.

=== Safety ===
ANCAP test results Land Rover Defender all 110 variants excluding V8 (2020, aligned with Euro NCAP)
Test	Points	%
Overall:	5 /5 stars	
Adult occupant:	32.51	85%
Child occupant:	43.22	88%
Pedestrian:	38.39	71%
Safety assist:	12.24	76%

ANCAP test results Land Rover Defender 110 Hard Top all 5 door variants (2020, aligned with Euro NCAP)
Test	Points	%
Overall:	5 /5 stars	
Adult occupant:	31.58	82%
Child occupant:	N/A	N/A%
Pedestrian:	38.39	71%
Safety assist:	13.24	82%

Euro NCAP test results Land Rover Defender 110 2.0 diesel SE (RHD) (2020)
Test	Points	%
Overall:	5 /5 stars	
Adult occupant:	32.5	85%
Child occupant:	41.7	85%
Pedestrian:	38.4	71%
Safety assist:	12.7	79%

== Special Editions ==
=== 2021 Bond Edition ===
Released alongside the 25th James Bond movie, No Time to Die, the Bond Edition Defenders were three hundred 2020 Defenders created by Land Rover to celebrate the car's appearance in the film. The Bond Edition Defender used a 518 Horsepower 5.0 Litre supercharged V8 and utilised the same gearbox as the standard V8 model. It came with all black exterior and 22" black alloy wheels paired with a rear 'Defender 007' badge and blue brake callipers. The infotainment system was fitted with a custom start-up screen to commemorate Land Rover's long lasting relations with the Bond franchise. The interior sported 'Defender 007' treadplates and all black seating. The car also sports exterior 007 graphic puddle lamps. The cars had either 90 or 110 wheelbases and had a starting price of £105,000.

=== 75th Anniversary Limited Edition ===
The Land Rover Defender 75th Anniversary Edition is a modified variant of the 2020 Defender with all Grasmere green paint (as a nod to the original 1948 HUE 166, 1st production Land Rover), for both the main body, wheels and interior cross beam. It is available in either a 300 horsepower, mild or plug-in automatic, all wheel drive diesel hybrid. The 75th Anniversary Edition also features a unique '75 Years' graphic placed across the entire vehicle. It can be purchased with either a panoramic sunroof or folding fabric roof. The mild hybrid version can be purchased with either 90" or 110" wheelbases, whilst the plug-in is strictly the 110" variant. The starting price for this car is around £86,000 ($105,000)

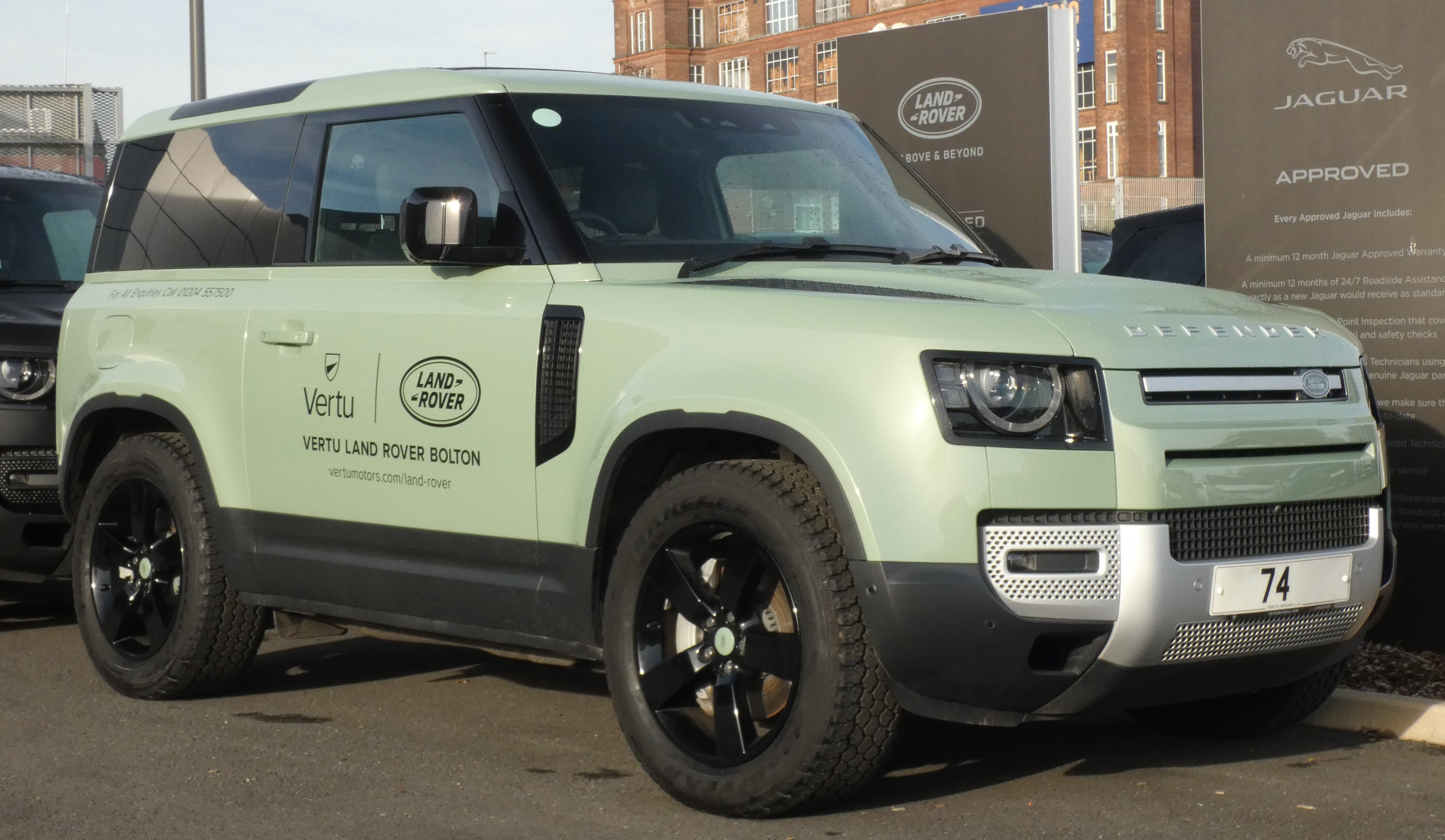
Defender 90 75th Anniversary Limited Edition

=== Defender Trophy Edition ===
In commemoration of the Camel Trophy off-road vehicle competition that featured the original Defender, The Land Rover Defender Trophy Edition is a modified variant of the 110 X-Dynamic SE. It is available in Deep Sandglow Yellow, similar to the original trophy colour, as well as Keswick Green - both can be opted with or without Satin Paint Protection Film. Trophy Edition exclusive 20" Style 9013 "Faux Steelies" are standard, along with Navrik Black trim, black wheel arch protection, front under shield, rear scuff plate. The Trophy Edition is adorned with Trophy Decals throughout the exterior. Sandglow Yellow models are available with Ebony Windsor Leather interior trim, and a Sandglow Yellow cross-car beam, while Keswick Green models are available with Ebony or Light Cloud Windsor Leather interior trim, and a Keswick Green cross-car beam.

Engine choices differ with markets. For example, in Australia the Trophy Edition is purely available with the D350 engine, while in the UK it is available with the D350 and P300e engines, and in the United States with the P400 engine. In the US Trophy Edition models come standard with the Off-Road and Advanced Off-Road packs.

The Trophy Edition comes with the launch of the Land Rover Trophy Challenge, similar to the Land Rover G4 Challenge and the original Camel Trophy.

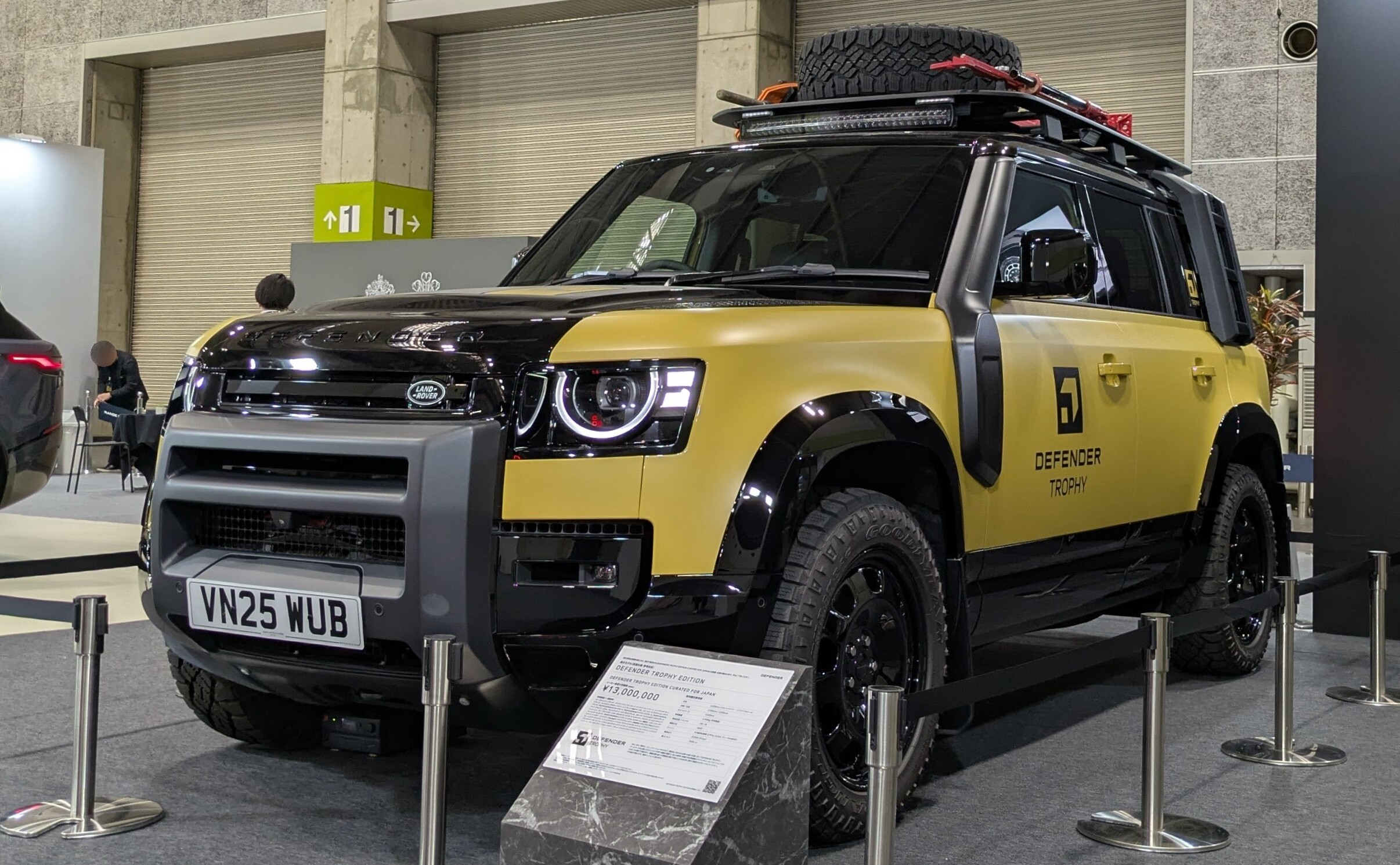
Defender TROPHY EDITION CURATED FOR JAPAN at Japan Mobility Show Kansai in 2025

Defender 30th Anniversary Edition

The Land Rover 30th Anniversary Edition is a limited edition of 500 produced for the 2023 model year exclusively for the North American market. The vehicle was built to commemorate the 30th anniversary of the Land Rover 110 Defenders entry into the United States market in 2023. The 30th Anniversary edition was based on the Defender 110 P300 S, with a 2.0 liter turbocharged inline-four engine that produces 296 HP and 295-lb-ft of torque.

Notable features include Fuji White paint color, 18" white steel wheels (steelies), OEM expedition roof rack, OEM side ladder, mud flaps and wheel-arch extensions, manual seats and badging denoting the 500 unit run. All units are marked with the same 1/500 badge.

Defender Trek Edition

The Defender Trek edition is a limited edition race vehicle from the Trek competition put on by Land Rover every year. After the competition, each highly customized vehicle is sold by the participating dealerships with the accessories used for the off road competition. Customization, model and accessories vary by year with the Trek 2021 Defender 110 being the most desired. Production numbers vary for each year but are never more than 100 per year. Actual number can be found on the badging that denotes race number and total number produced. (ie. 8/70)

== Base trims ==
Over the Defender L663’s production run, basic trims available have changed slightly and differ slightly between markets, though most ranges consist of 90, 110 and 130 body styles, as well as the S, S X-Dynamic, SE, SE X-Dynamic, HSE and HSE X-Dynamic models regardless. X-Dynamic models are better equipped and have different trim to their non-X-Dynamic counterparts, while still not rising above the next rung of trim level. For example, an SE X-Dynamic is not better equipped than a standard HSE. However, it’s important to note that most markets do not have all 6 trim levels, most adopting a more range simple of S, SE X-Dynamic and HSE X-Dynamic models. Previously there was a ‘Standard’ model positioned beneath the S model, however this has been phased out in most markets for MY24.

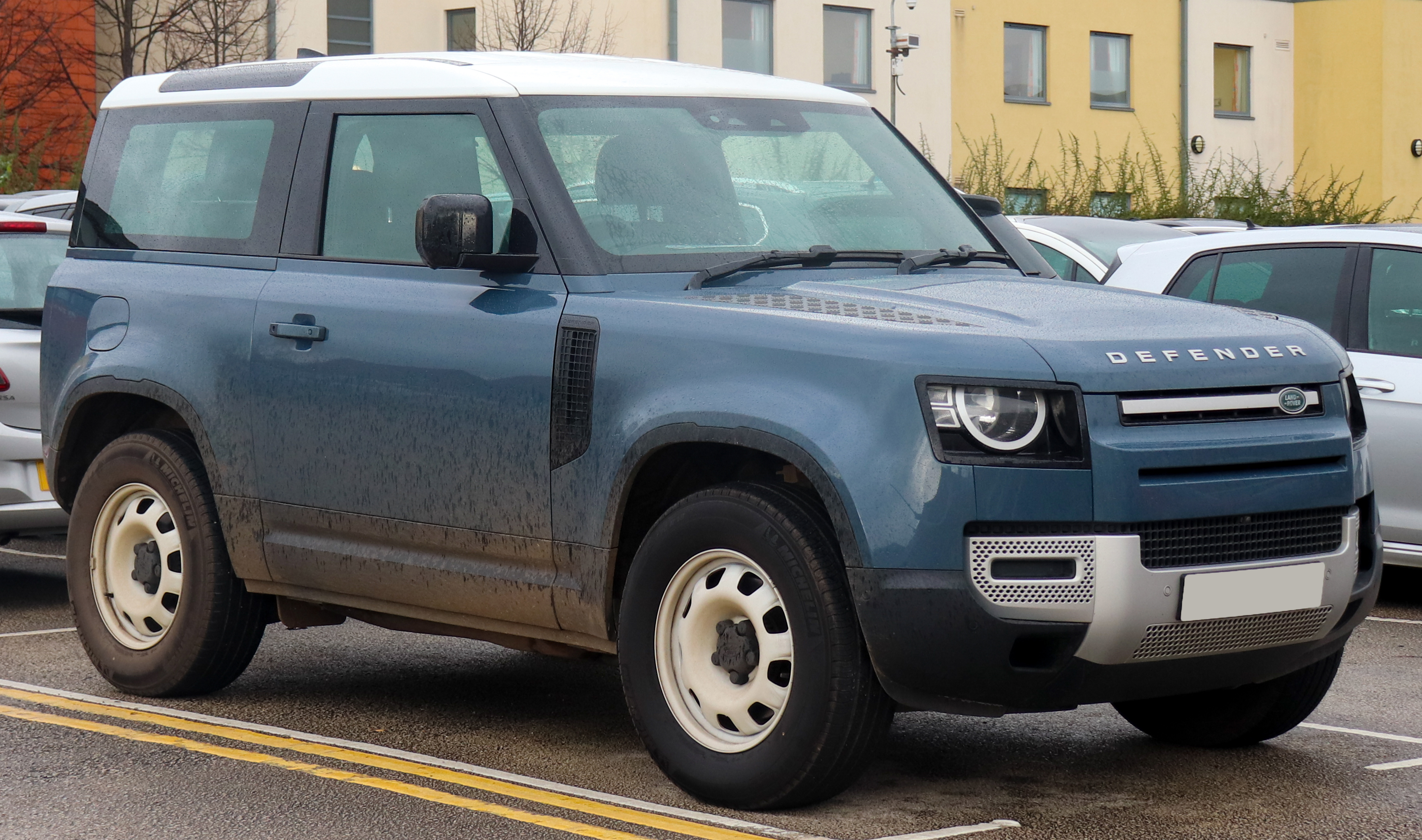
Defender 90; likely ‘Standard’ or ‘S’ model due to silver trim, 18” wheels and non-matrix headlights.

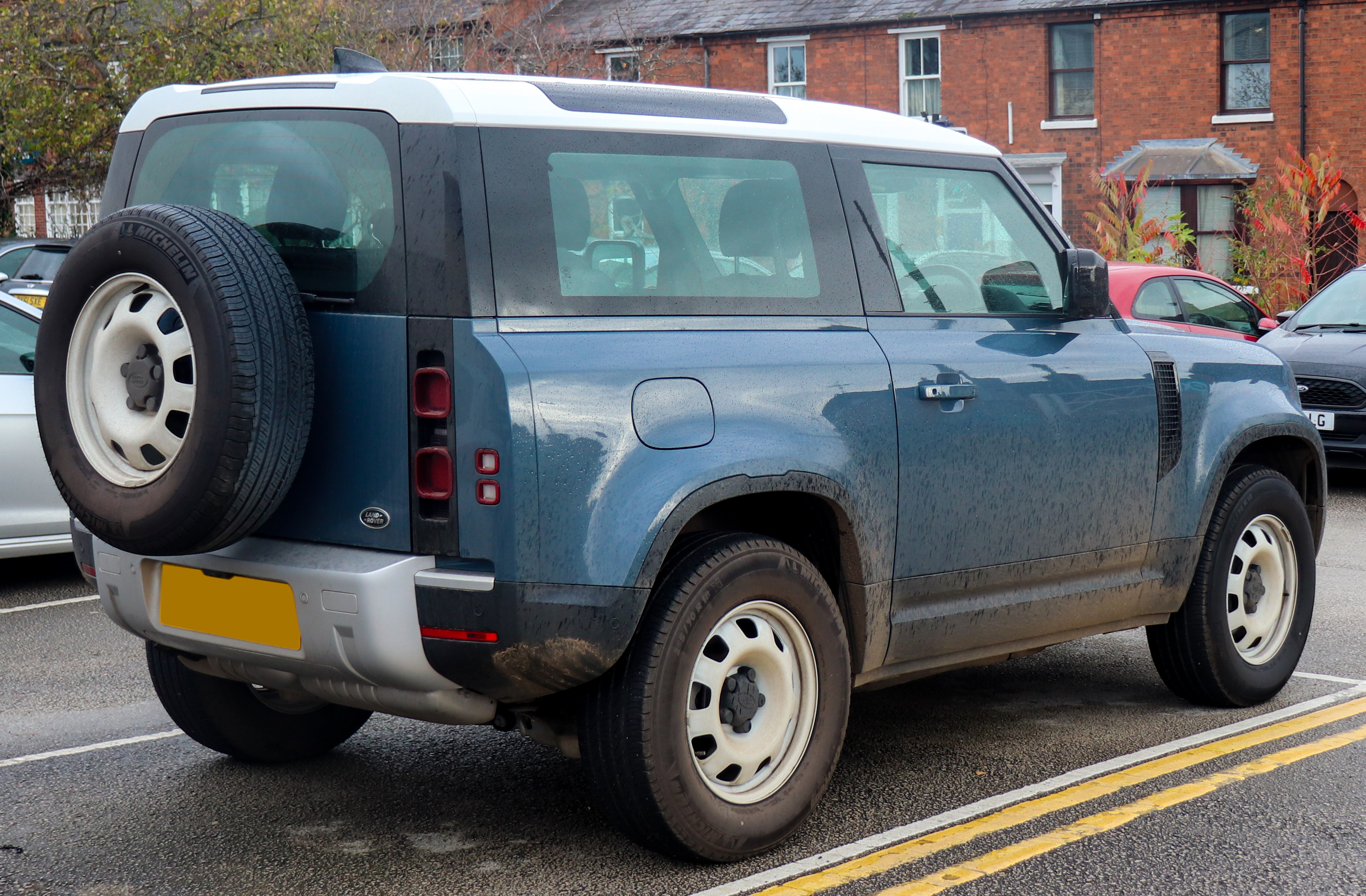
Defender 90

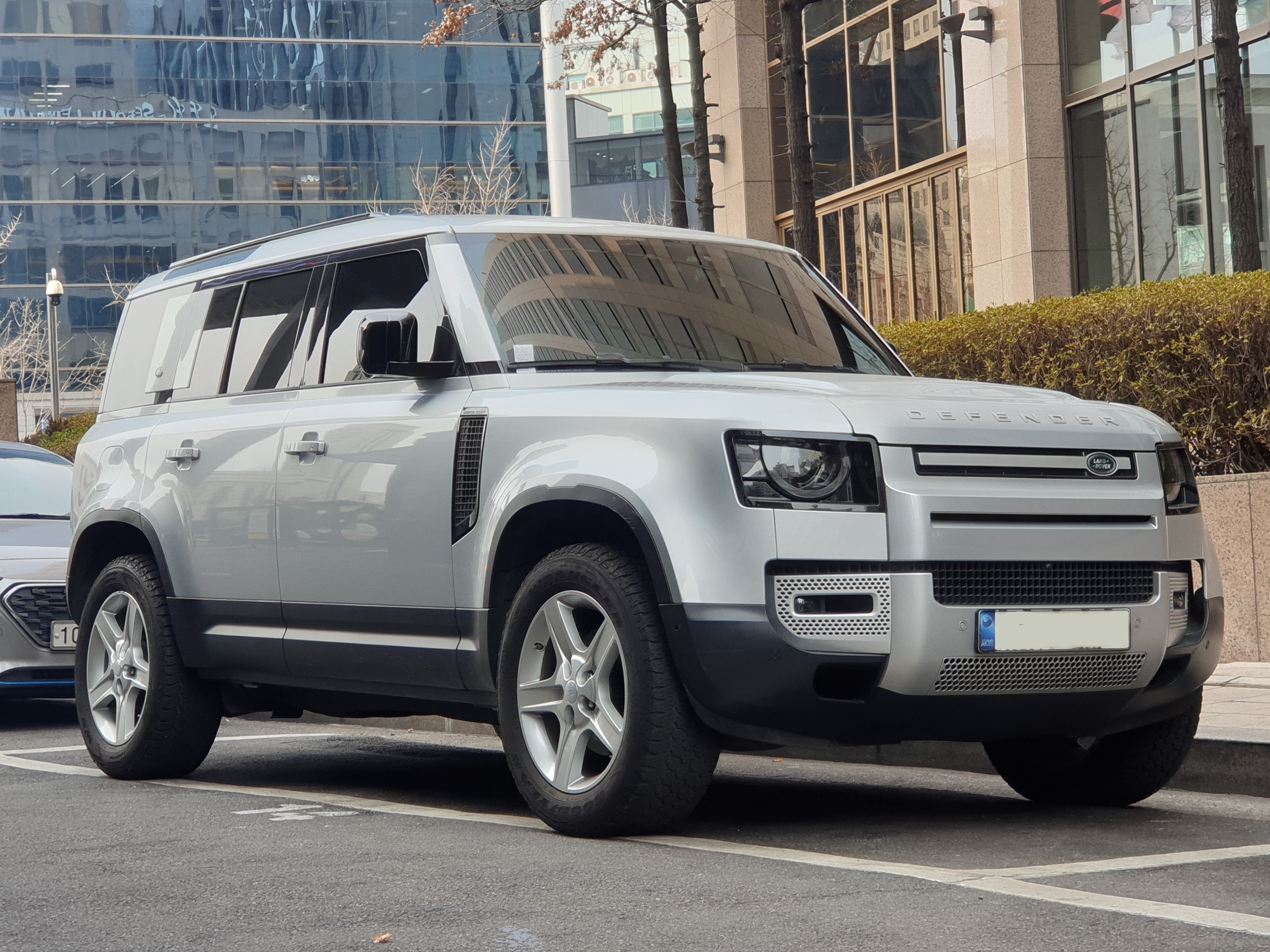
Defender 110; likely SE model due to silver trim, silver style 5094 wheels and matrix LED headlights.

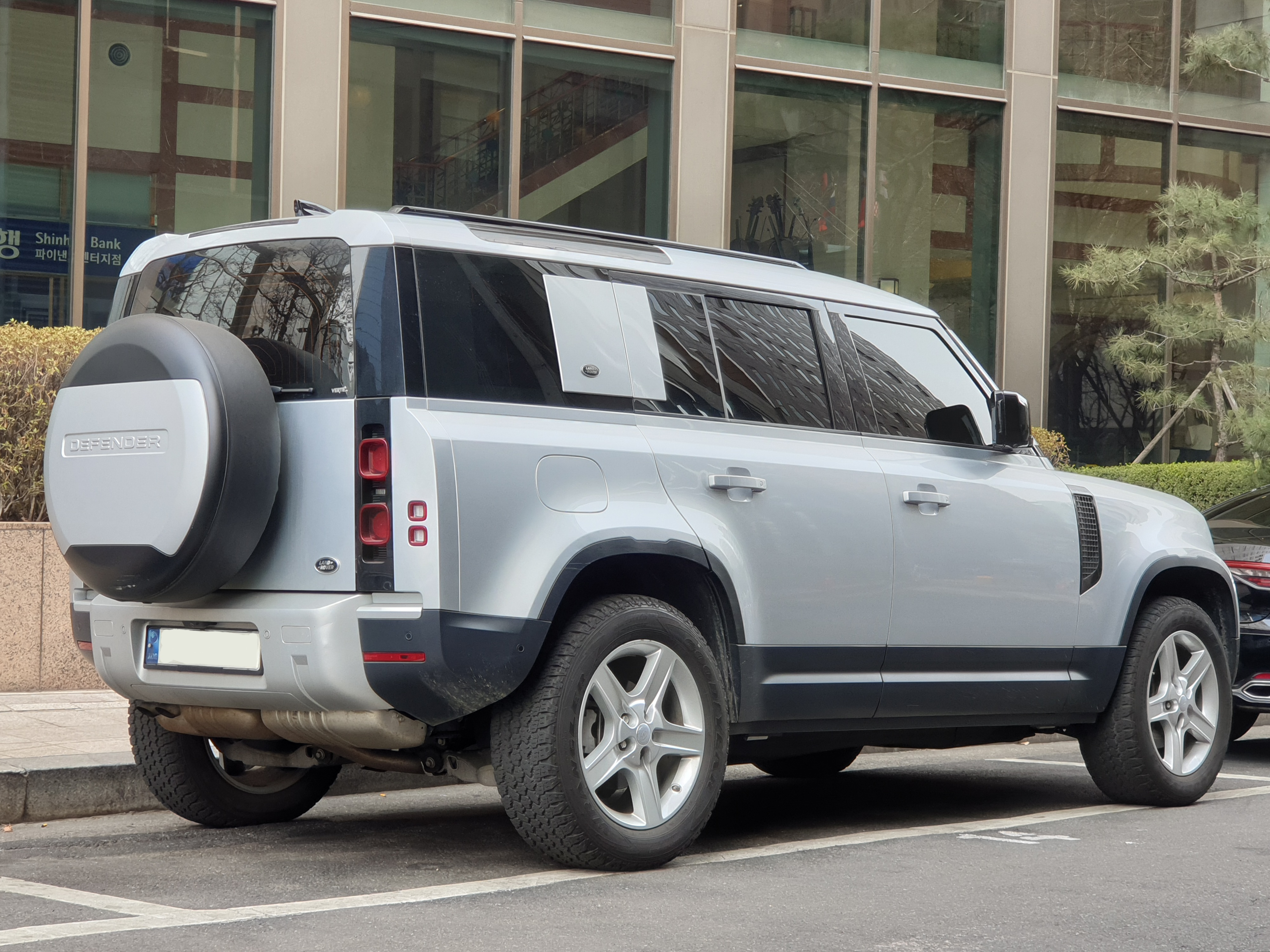
Defender 110

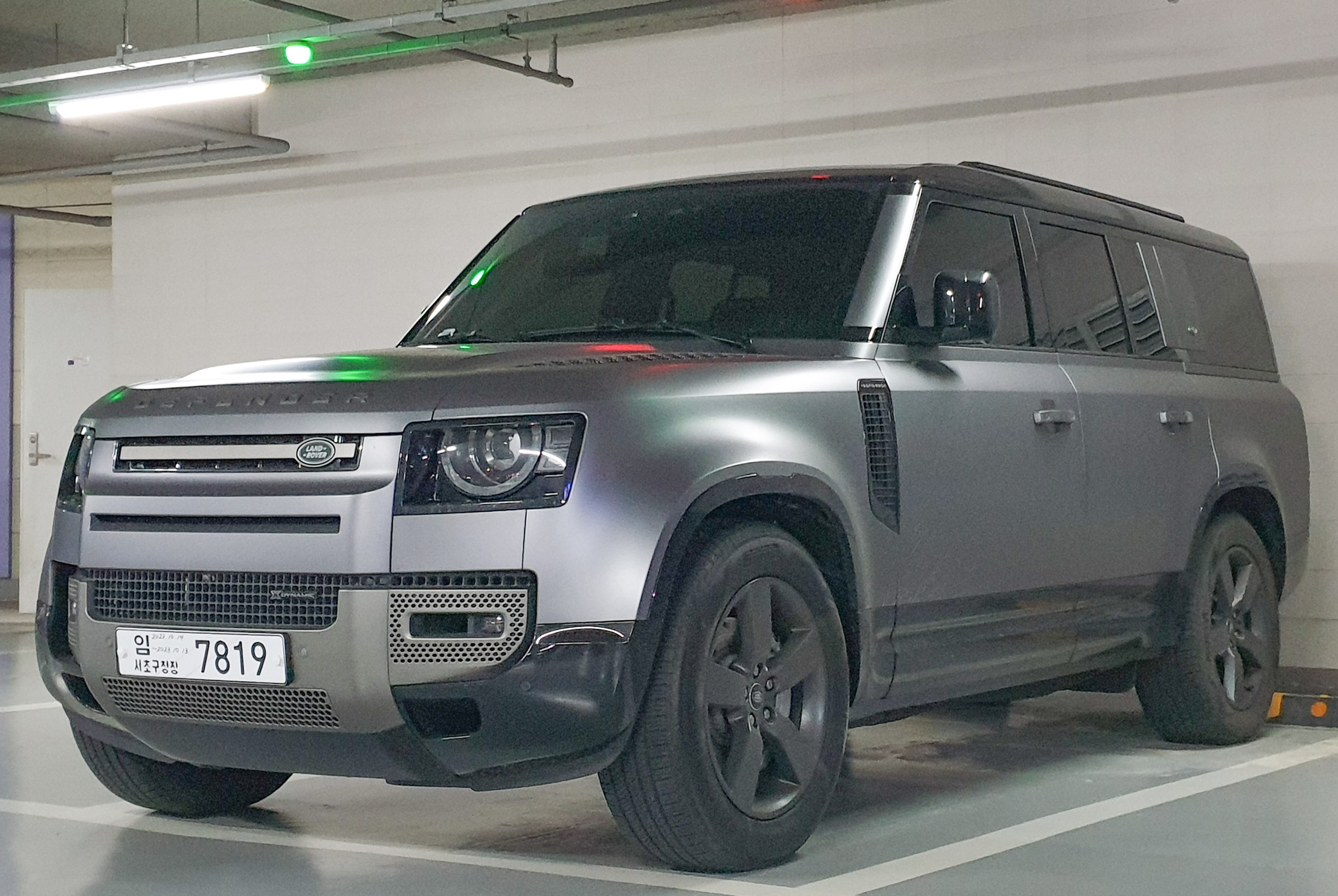
Defender 130; likely X-Dynamic SE model due to Starlight Satin + gloss Navrik Black and satin grey style 5098 wheels

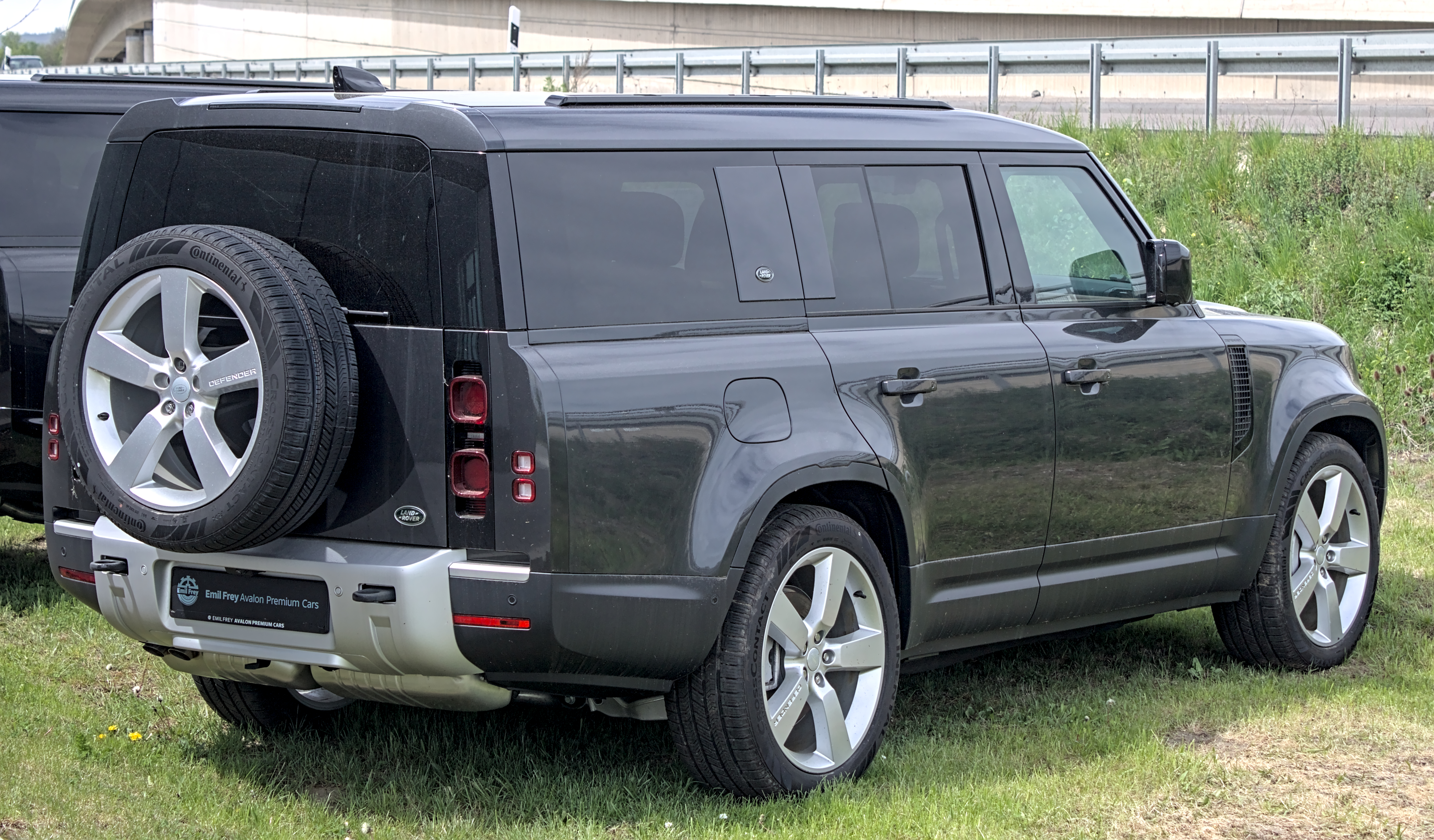
Defender 130

== Performance variants ==
=== Defender X ===
The Defender D300 X is essentially a performance variant of the base Defender. According to CarExpert, it has an output of 220 kW (299 PS; 295 hp) and 650 N⋅m (479 lbf⋅ft).

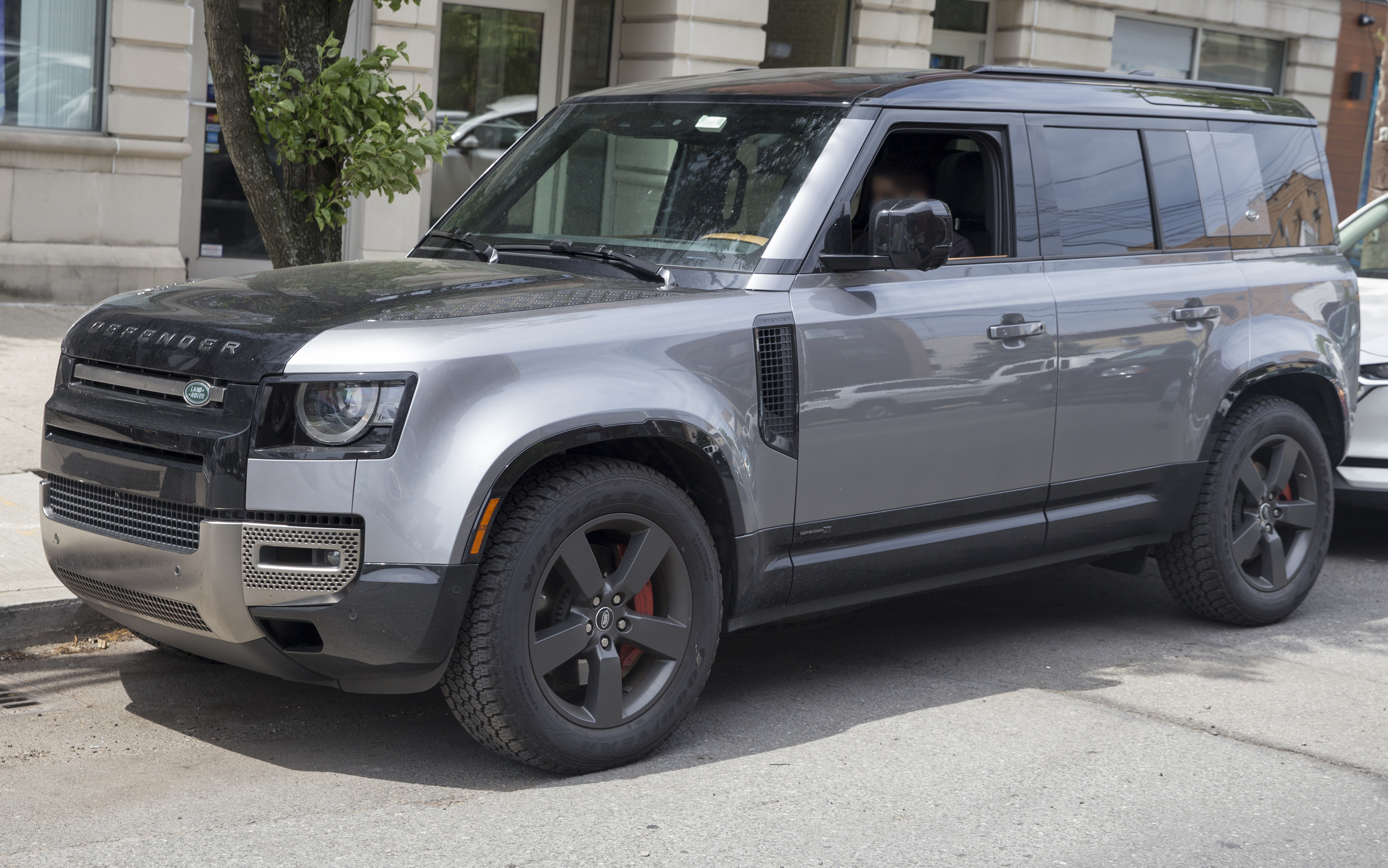
Defender 110 X

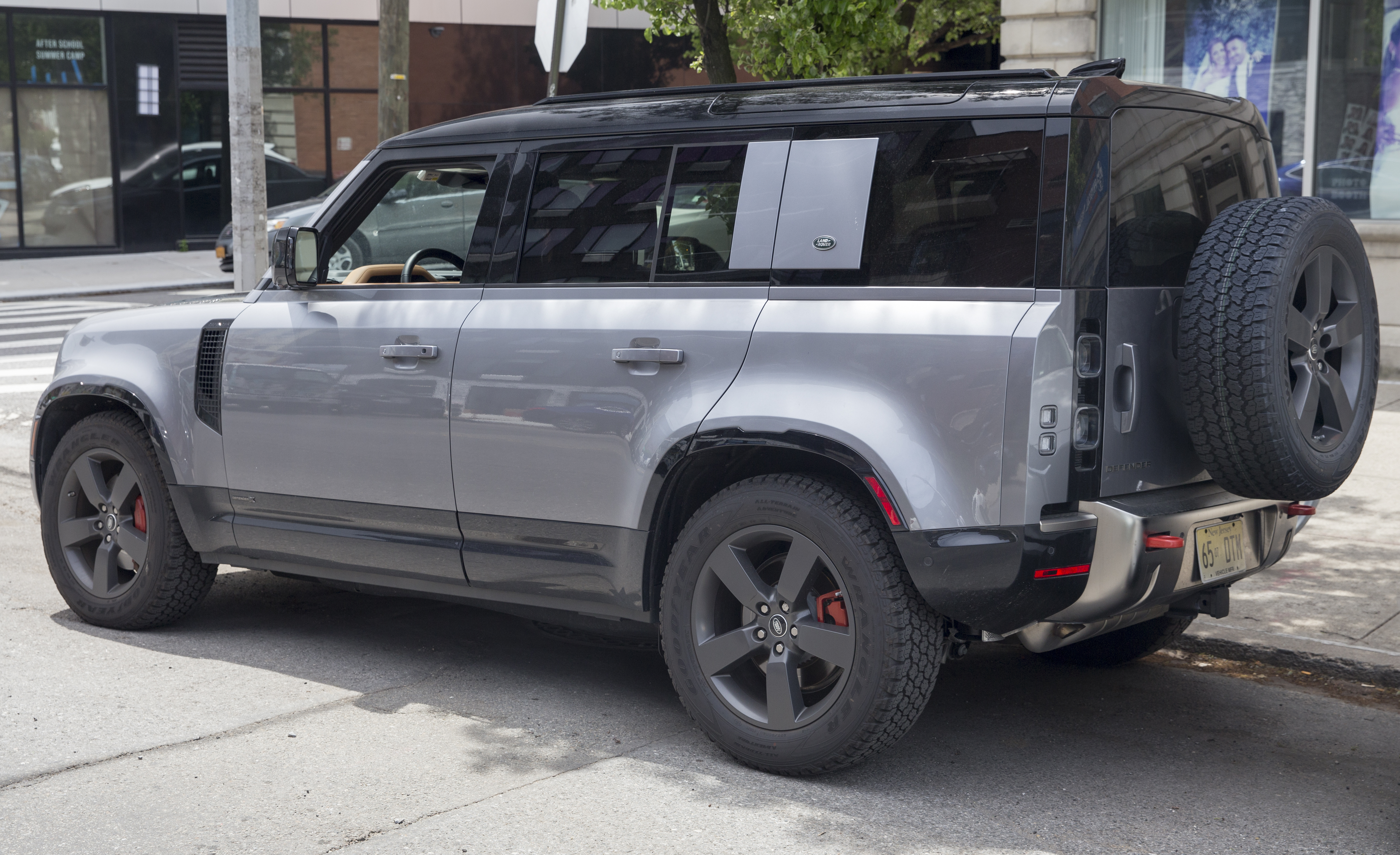
Defender 110 X

=== Defender V8 ===
The Defender V8, also known as the Defender P525, is a performance variant of the Defender, with better performance than the Defender X. It uses a supercharged AJ133 5.0-litre V8 engine. Top speed ranges from 191 to 240 km/h (119 to 149 mph), with 386 kW (518 hp), with a 0–100 km/h of about 5.2 to 5.4 seconds. It uses the same V8 as the Jaguar F-Type, rated at 625 N⋅m (461 lbf⋅ft). The Defender V8 is available in the compact 90, the mid-size 110, and the long-wheelbase 130.

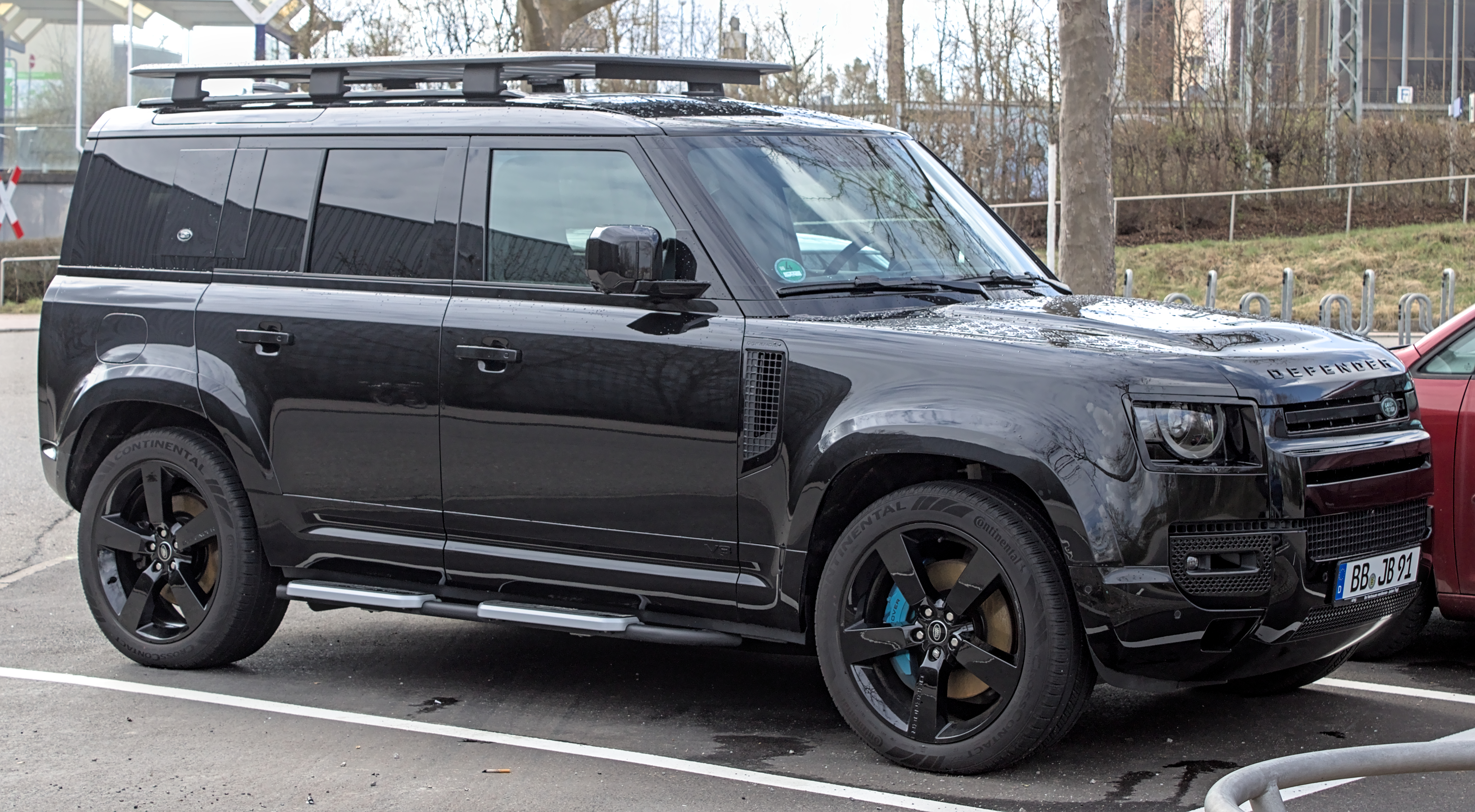
Defender 110 V8 Bond Edition

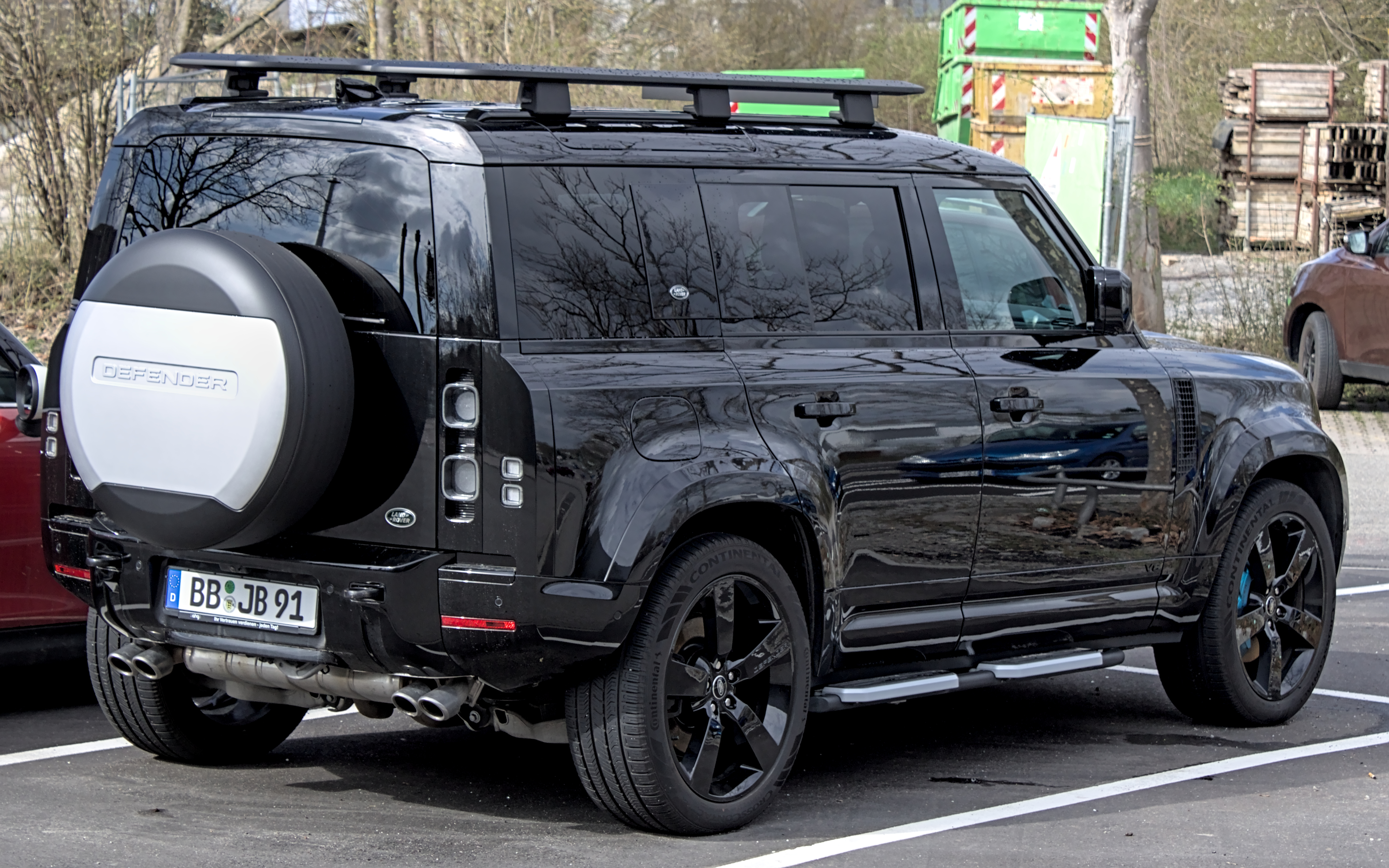
Defender 110 V8 Bond Edition

=== Defender V8 Carpathian Edition ===
The Defender V8 Carpathian Edition also known as the Defender P525 has a 5.0-litre P525 V8 petrol engine that can tow up to 7,716 pounds thanks to its 461 pound-feet of torque.

=== Defender OCTA ===
The Defender OCTA is the high-performance variant of the Defender, positioned above the Defender V8 as the most capable, most luxurious and fastest model and is only offered as the 110 model. The 4.4L BMW V8 engine, producing 635 PS (467 kW; 626 hp) and up to 750 N⋅m (553 lb⋅ft) of torque, is also available in the Range Rover and Range Rover Sport models. This is the most powerful engine available for the Defender, enabling it to accelerate from 0-60 mph (97m km/h) in a claimed 3.8 seconds. Coupled with the high and low range 8-speed automatic transmission the Defender OCTA has a top speed of 210 km/h (130 mph) with 20 inch wheels, and 249 km/h (155 mph) with 22 inch wheels. To support the larger engine, a stiffened transmission cradle, upgraded cooling system with thicker radiators and uprated oil coolers, thicker driveshafts, and stronger rear differential components are included.

Additionally, the Defender OCTA includes hydraulically-interlinked 6D Dynamics Suspension technology, also featured on the Range Rover Sport SV. This system allows the Defender OCTA more wheel articulation off-road, while also reducing body-roll on road. It is 28 mm higher and 68 mm wider than a standard Defender, allowing for 323 mm of ground clearance, 550 mm of wheel articulation and one meter wading capacity. The front and rear axles being moved forward 4 and 3 mm (0.16 and 0.12 in) respectively allows the Defender OCTA to fit 33-inch tyres, with both the 20 inch and 22 inch designs exclusive to the OCTA. Also included is the fastest steering system on a Defender yet, as well as 400 mm front brake discs and 365 mm rear brake discs supplied by Brembo.

As previously mentioned, the Defender OCTA is significantly wider than the standard Defender. Thus, the front and rear bumpers are redesigned for the larger fenders as well as the increased front and rear approach angles. Redesigned grilles and the signature Defender OCTA octagon logo are present around the car. The Defender OCTA comes in colours Petra Copper, Carpathian Grey, and Charente Grey with Phosphor Bronze accents while the OCTA Edition One coming in Faroe Green. All OCTA's have a contrast roof and tailgate in Narvik Black. The Defender OCTA also has the option of dual raised air intakes. The interior includes new performance Body and Soul front seats, with the rear bench seat including more bolstering than the standard Defender. The standard Defender OCTA has the option of Burnt Sienna semi‑aniline leather, with Kvadrat textile trim in Ebony, Ultrafabrics PU in Light Cloud and Lunar, or semi‑aniline leather in Ebony for its interior. Also new is the 'signature logo' button on the steering wheel - positioned below the airbag. A short press changes the car into dynamic mode - best for on-road performance driving - while a long press switches the car into OCTA mode. This new drive mode is for performance focused off-road driving, including an off-road launch control and tweaked ABS settings for better off-road braking. USDM Defender OCTAs have amber lights on the grille.

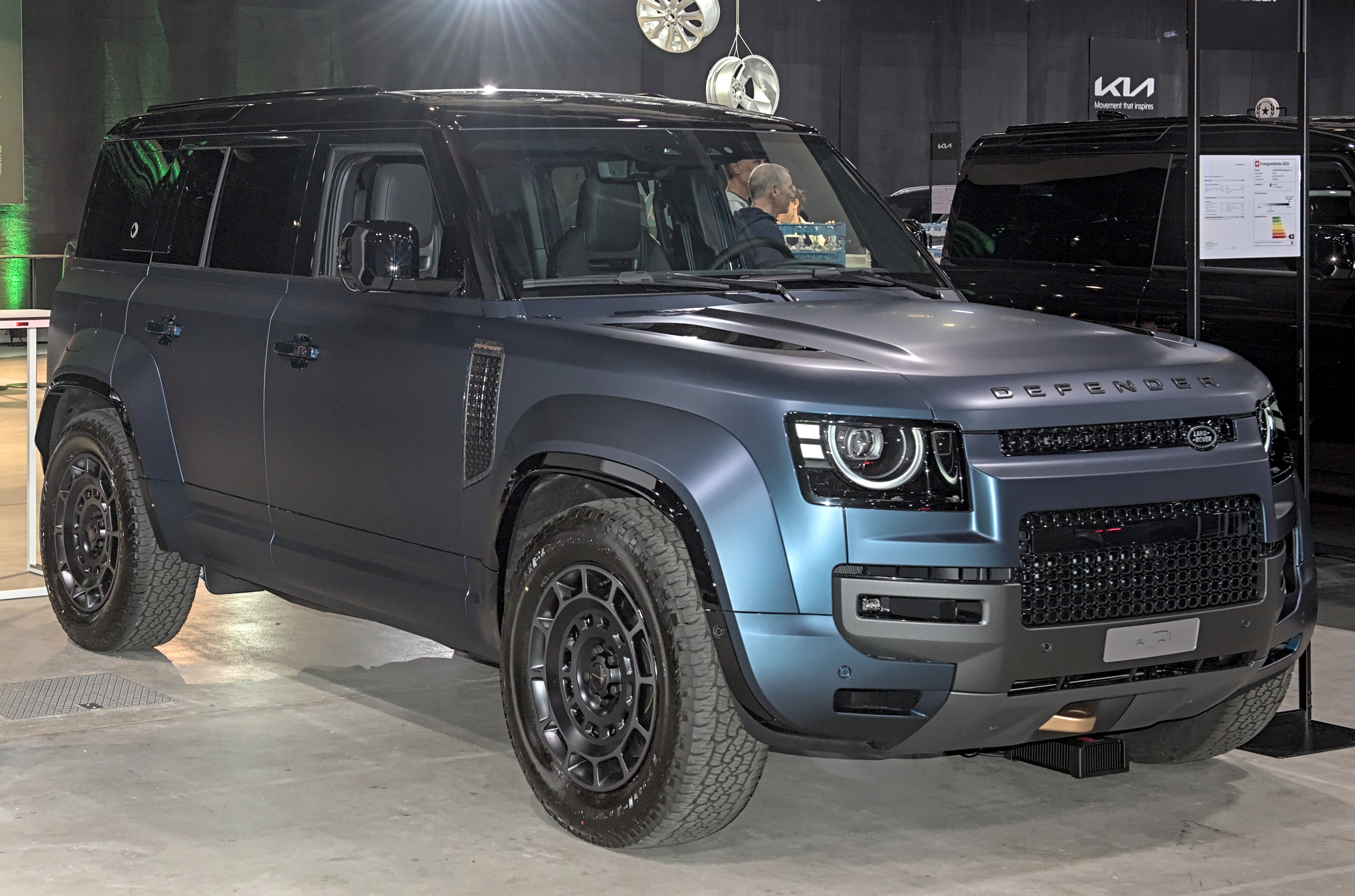
Defender OCTA

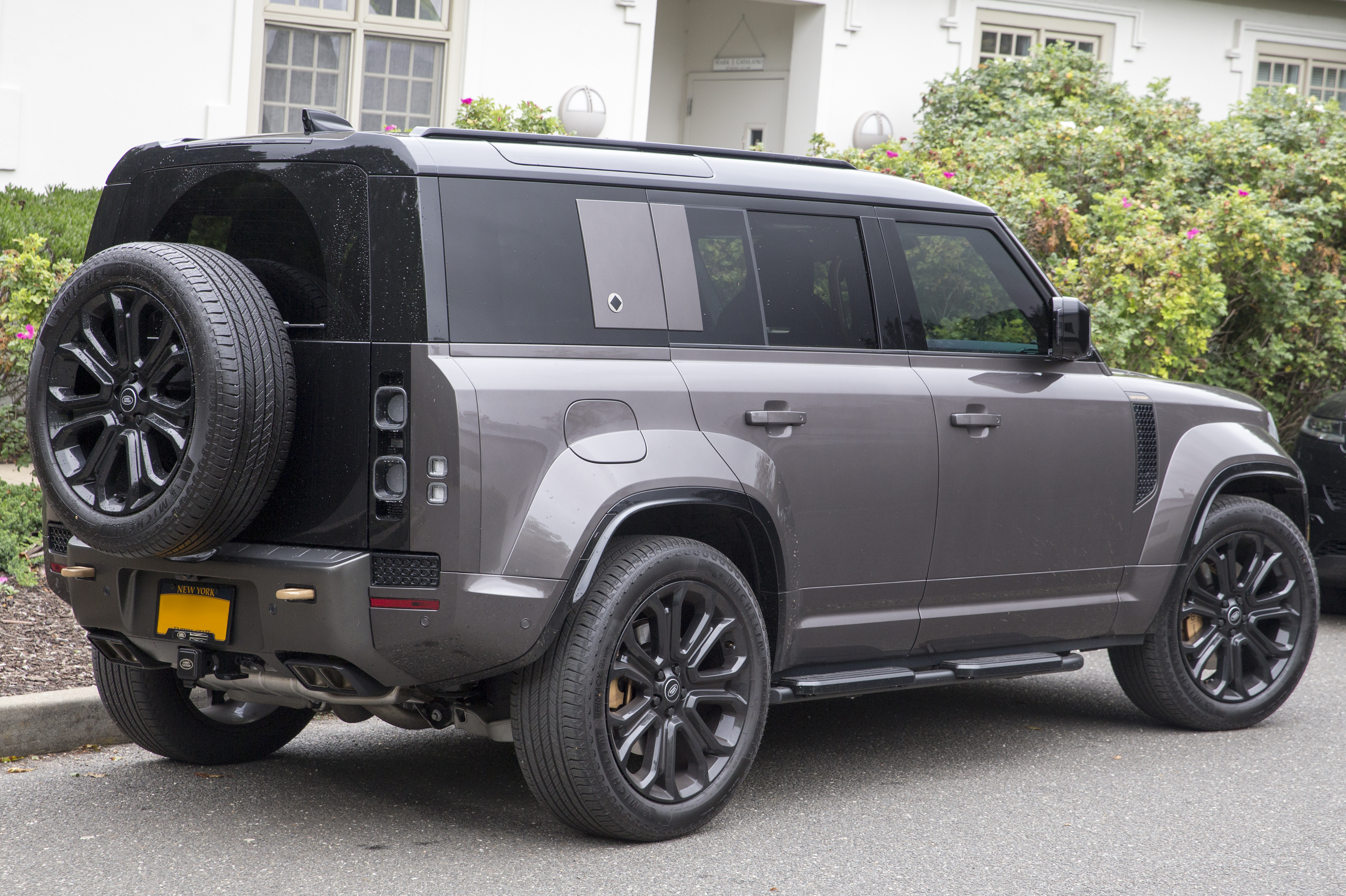
Defender OCTA (rear view)

== Revisions ==
=== 26MY facelift ===
On 28 May 2025, the Defender L663's first major revision was unveiled. Spanning across 90, 110 and 130 body styles, a variety of subtle enhancements were introduced to bring the offering up to 2026, as the Defender went mostly unchanged from its 2020 launch.

Changes were headlined by updated headlights and taillights that are now flush with the bodywork. The front and rear aprons were revised and the fog light surrounds now lack perforation. The grille bar became standard in black - previously an element of the Black Exterior Pack and Extended Black Exterior pack, while other trim pieces' standard colour was changed to Satin Silicon Silver from Satin Ceres Silver. Satin Ceres Silver trim pieces were still available, just in the County Exterior Pack, with Navrik Black trim pieces available in the Extended Black Exterior Pack, or as standard on the X model and Satin Carpathian Grey trim pieces on the X-Dynamic Trim levels.

In terms of colour offerings, Woolstone Green was introduced in replacement of Pangea green, as well as Borasco Grey to replace Eiger Grey - an offering dropped several years before the update. The OCTA also gets Borasco Grey, along with 'all-new' Sargasso Blue. New 22" seven-spoke Diamond-Turned Style 7030 were introduced, along with black centre caps with "DEFENDER" script as a part of Land Rover's new 'house of brands' strategy - meaning the only Land Rover badge featured is on the front grille, a juxtaposition to its placement in earlier models on the front grille, wheels, signature graphic and tailgate.

The touchscreen was upped from 11.4 inches to 13.1 inches in size, with the centre interior controls and gearstick angled slightly to accommodate the larger size. Adaptive Off-Road Cruise Control also became available, and a new steering wheel column mounted Driver Attention Monitor was added as standard in the EU. Engine offerings were also altered depending on the market.

26MY also saw the discontinuation of the Country Accessory Pack - leaving only the Adventure, Explorer and Urban packs. To suit the vehicle's continual move to darker hues, the Expedition Roof Rack, Cross Bars, Front Undershield and Rear Scuff Plate were all offered in dark finishes in addition to bright variations. A new Urban Bonnet Decal was brought to market to complement the pre-existing decals with "90", "110" and "130" script, and the chequer bonnet finisher becoming standard only on the X (and similar) trim levels. For S, X-Dynamic SE and X-Dynamic HSE a new bonnet finisher with patterned squares was introduced.

In September 2026, the Defender Wolf Series II was launched, based on D7x platform, and will compete for the UK Ministry of Defence Light Mobility Vehicle tender. Designed in the UK with a British built engine, it will be assembled in Slovakia.

== Specifications ==
=== Defender 90 engine specifications ===
Petrol engines
Model	Year(s)	Displacement	Fuel type	Tank Capacity	Power	Torque	0–100 km/h (0–62 mph)	Consumption (NEDC2)- l/100 km	CO2 Emissions
P300	2019–	1,997 cc (121.9 cu in)	Petrol	88.5 L (19.5 imp gal; 23.4 US gal)	300 PS (221 kW; 296 bhp)	400 N⋅m (295 ft⋅lb_{f})	8.0 s	10.0	224 g/km
P400 MHEV	2019–	2,996 cc (182.8 cu in)	Petrol	88.5 L (19.5 imp gal; 23.4 US gal)	400 PS (294 kW; 395 bhp)	550 N⋅m (406 ft⋅lb_{f})	6.0 s	9.8	219 g/km
P525	2021–	4,999 cc (305.1 cu in)	Petrol	88.5 L (19.5 imp gal; 23.4 US gal)	525 PS (386 kW, 518 bhp)	625 Nm (461 ft lb)	5.2 s	12.1	327 g/km

Diesel engines
Model	Year(s)	Displacement	Fuel type	Tank Capacity	Power	Torque	0–100 km/h (0–62 mph)	Consumption (NEDC2)- l/100 km	CO2 Emissions
D200	2019–2021	1,999 cc (122.0 cu in)	Diesel	83.5 L (18.4 imp gal; 22.1 US gal)	200 PS (147 kW; 197 bhp)	430 N⋅m (317 ft⋅lb_{f})	10.2 s		199 g/km
D240	2019–2021	1,999 cc (122.0 cu in)	Diesel	83.5 L (18.4 imp gal; 22.1 US gal)	240 PS (177 kW; 237 bhp)	430 N⋅m (317 ft⋅lb_{f})	9.0 s	7.7	199 g/km
D200	2020–	2,996 cc	Diesel	89 L	200 PS (147 kW)	500 Nm	9.8 s	7.6	199 g/km
D250	2020–	2,996 cc	Diesel	89 L	249 PS (183 kW)	570 Nm	8.0 s	7.6	199 g/km
D300	2020–	2,996 cc	Diesel	89 L	300 PS (221 kW)	650 Nm	6.7 s	7.6	199 g/km

=== Defender 110 engine specifications ===
Petrol engines
Model	Year(s)	Displacement	Fuel type	Tank Capacity	Power	Torque	0–100 km/h (0–62 mph)	Consumption (NEDC2)- l/100 km	CO2 Emissions
P300	2019–	1,997 cc (121.9 cu in)	Petrol	90 L (20 imp gal; 24 US gal)	300 PS (221 kW; 296 bhp)	400 N⋅m (295 ft⋅lb_{f})	8.1 s	10.2	227 g/km
P400 MHEV	2019–	2,996 cc (182.8 cu in)	Petrol	90 L (20 imp gal; 24 US gal)	400 PS (294 kW; 395 bhp)	550 N⋅m (406 ft⋅lb_{f})	6.1 s	9.9	220 g/km
P400e	2020–	1,997 cc (121.9 cu in)	Petrol, Electricity	90 L (20 imp gal; 24 US gal) Electric range 43 km (27 miles)	Total System 404 PS (297 kW; 398 bhp) Petrol 300 PS (221 kW; 296 bhp) Electric 143 PS (105 kW; 141 bhp)	640 N⋅m (472 ft⋅lb_{f})	5.4 s		74 g/km
P525	2021–	4,999 cc (305.1 cu in)	Petrol	90 L (20 imp gal; 24 US gal)	525 PS (386 kW, 518 bhp)	625 Nm (461 ft lb)	5.4 s	12.1	327 g/km
P635	2024–	4,395 cc (268.2 cu in)	Petrol	90 L (20 imp gal; 24 US gal)	635 PS (467 kW; 626 bhp)	750 N⋅m (553 ft⋅lb_{f})	4.4 s	13.3	294 g/km

Diesel engines
Model	Year(s)	Displacement	Fuel type	Tank Capacity	Power	Torque	0–100 km/h (0–62 mph)	Consumption (NEDC2)- l/100 km	CO2 Emissions
D200	2019–2021	1,999 cc (122.0 cu in)	Diesel	85 L (19 imp gal; 22 US gal)	200 PS (147 kW; 197 bhp)	430 N⋅m (317 ft⋅lb_{f})	10.3 s		199 g/km
D240	2019–2021	1,999 cc (122.0 cu in)	Diesel	85 L (19 imp gal; 22 US gal)	240 PS (177 kW; 237 bhp)	430 N⋅m (317 ft⋅lb_{f})	9.1 s	7.7-7.8	199 g/km
D200	2020–	2,996 cc	Diesel	89 L	200 PS (147 kW)	500 Nm	10.2 s	7.6	200 g/km
D250	2020–	2,996 cc	Diesel	89 L	249 PS (183 kW)	570 Nm	8.3 s	7.6	200 g/km
D300	2020–	2,996 cc	Diesel	89 L	300 PS (221 kW)	650 Nm	7.0 s	7.6	
D350	2024–	2,997 cc	Diesel	89 L	350 PS (257 kW)	700 Nm	6.4 s	7.6	

== Engine & Model Availability ==
Australia - As of September 2024
	D250	D350	P400e	P400	P500	P525	P635
90 S	Yes	No	No	No	No	No	No
90 X	No	No	No	Yes	No	No	No
90 V8	No	No	No	No	No	Yes	No
110 S	No	No	No	Yes	No	No	No
110 X-Dynamic SE	No	Yes	Yes	Yes	No	No	No
110 X-Dynamic HSE	No	Yes	Yes	Yes	No	No	No
110 Sedona Edition	No	Yes	No	No	No	No	No
110 X	No	Yes	No	Yes	No	No	No
110 V8	No	No	No	No	No	Yes	No
110 OCTA (incl. Edition One)	No	No	No	No	No	No	Yes
130 X-Dynamic SE	No	No	Yes	Yes	No	No	No
130 Outbound	No	No	No	Yes	No	No	No
130 V8	No	No	No	No	Yes	No	No

United Kingdom - As of September 2024
	D250	D350	P400e	P425	P500	P525	P635
90 S	No	Yes	No	No	No	No	No
90 X-Dynamic SE	Yes	Yes	No	No	No	No	No
90 X-Dynamic HSE	Yes	Yes	No	No	No	No	No
90 X	Yes	No	No	Yes	No	No	No
90 V8	No	No	No	No	No	Yes	No
110 S	Yes	Yes	Yes	No	No	No	No
110 X-Dynamic SE	Yes	Yes	Yes	No	No	No	No
110 X-Dynamic HSE	Yes	Yes	Yes	No	No	No	No
110 Sedona Edition	No	Yes	Yes	No	No	No	No
110 X	No	Yes	Yes	Yes	No	No	No
110 OCTA (incl. Edition One)	No	No	No	No	No	No	Yes
130 X-Dynamic SE	No	Yes	No	Yes	No	No	No
130 Outbound	No	Yes	No	No	No	No	No
130 X-Dynamic HSE	No	Yes	No	Yes	No	No	No
130 X	No	Yes	No	Yes	No	No	No
130 V8	No	No	No	No	Yes	No	No
90 Hard Top S	Yes	No	No	No	No	No	No
90 Hard Top X-Dynamic SE	Yes	No	No	No	No	No	No
90 Hard Top X-Dynamic HSE	Yes	Yes	No	No	No	No	No
110 Hard Top S	Yes	No	No	No	No	No	No
110 Hard Top X-Dynamic SE	Yes	No	No	No	No	No	No
110 Hard Top X-Dynamic HSE	Yes	Yes	No	No	No	No	No

== See also ==
- Ineos Grenadier, a 4x4 closer in form to the original Defender.
