= Jaguar Advanced Lightweight Coupe Concept =

Advanced Lightweight Coupe Concept
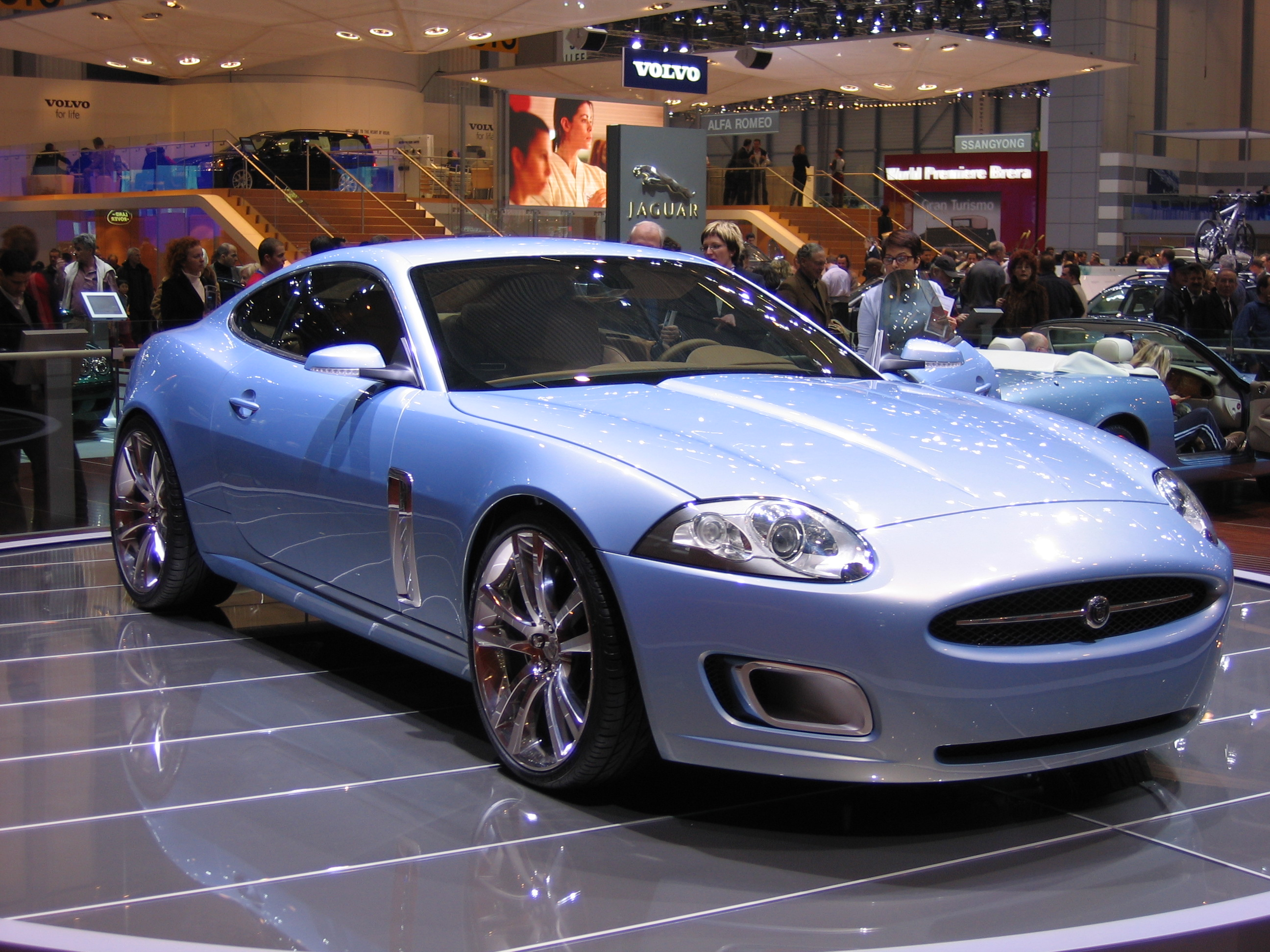
- The Jaguar ALC at the 2005 Geneva Motor Show

Overview
- Manufacturer: Jaguar Cars
- Production: 2005
- Designer: Ian Callum; Giles Taylor

Body and chassis
- Class: Concept car
- Body style: 2-door coupé
- Layout: Front-engine, rear-wheel-drive
- Platform: Jaguar XJ
- Related: Jaguar XK (X150)

Powertrain
- Engine: 4.2 L AJ34S supercharged V8
- Transmission: 6-speed automatic

The Jaguar Advanced Lightweight Coupe (ALC) is a sports coupé concept car first shown at the 2005 North American International Auto Show in Detroit by the British automobile manufacturer Jaguar, then part of Ford's Premier Automotive Group.

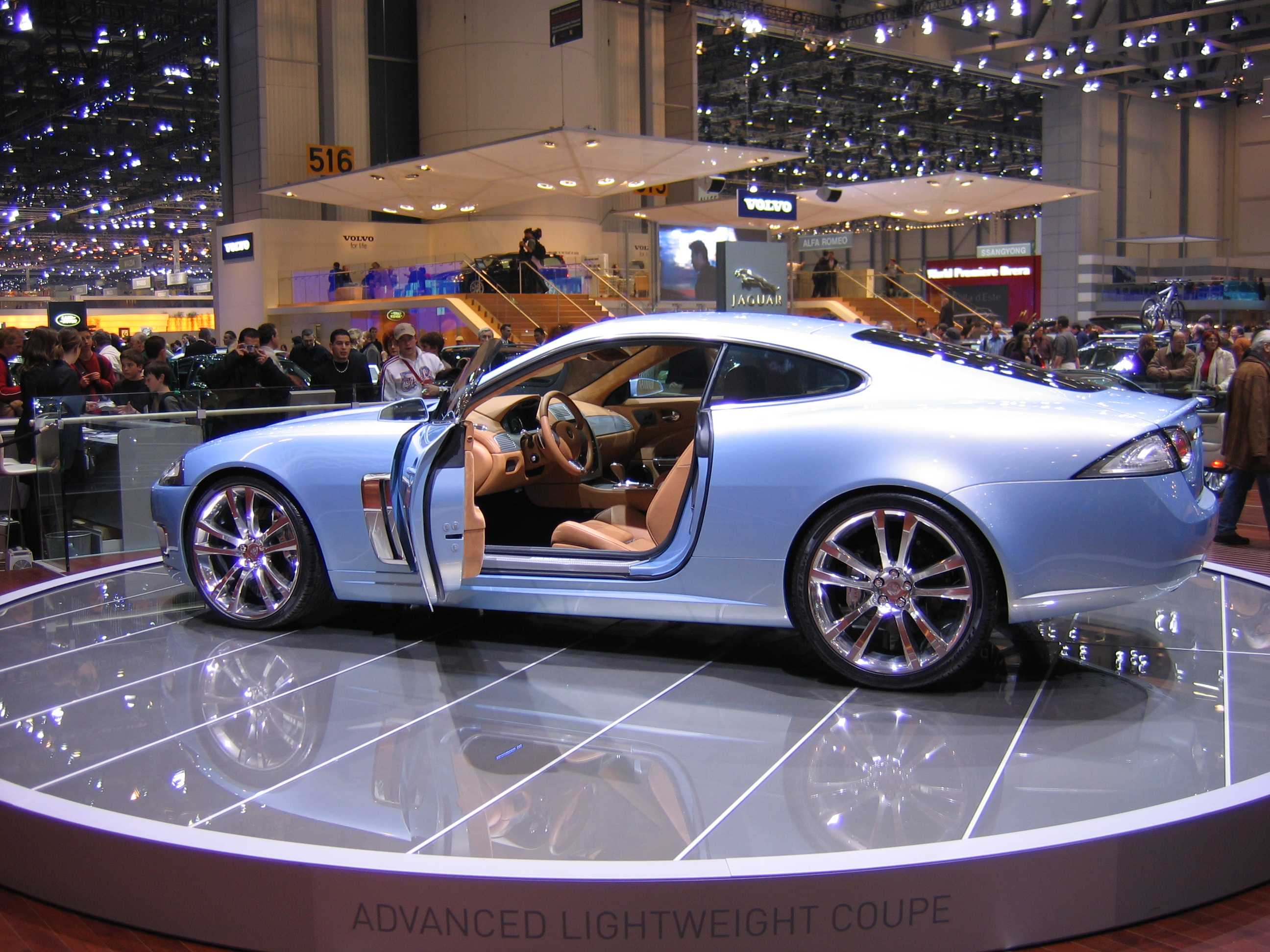
Rear view

Designed by Ian Callum and Giles Taylor the concept previewed the Jaguar XK which was subsequently launched at the autumn 2005 Frankfurt Motor Show.

The designers sought their inspiration from famous Jaguar automobiles of the past when designing the car, with the E-Type being the main inspiration as the grille of the ALC paid homage to the car. The hatchback design, 2+2 seating layout and the bonnet harkened back to its predecessor, the XK8. Other design elements are shared with the R-Coupe concept of 2001 and the R-D6 concept of 2003. The aluminium chassis shared with the XJ saloon and all-aluminium construction were a first for a Jaguar grand tourer.

The interior is a mixed of simplistic and modern design elements. It is upholstered in tan leather and had aluminium inserts. The pedals are adjustable and the car features gear shift paddles on the steering column for easier gear changes by the driver. An Alpine telematics system is present on the centre console which controls most of the car's functions.

The car is powered by a supercharged 4.2-litre V8 engine similar to the unit fitted to the outgoing XKR and is equipped with computer active technology suspension and active restraint technology system. The engine is mated to a 6-speed automatic transmission. The car utilises 21-inch wheels with Pirelli tyres. Jaguar claims the concept can accelerate from a standstill to 97 km/h (60 mph) in 5 seconds, and that it has a top speed of 290 km/h (180 mph).
