= Jaguar R =

Jaguar R may refer to:

- Jaguar R and SVR models — Jaguar's high-performance division of production cars.

== List of Jaguar R-models ==
Jaguar R-Type Formula 1 race cars from Jaguar Racing

- Jaguar R1 — 2000 Formula 1 season
- Jaguar R2 — 2001 Formula 1 season
- Jaguar R3 — 2002 Formula 1 season
- Jaguar R4 — 2003 Formula 1 season
- Jaguar R5 — 2004 Formula 1 season

Jaguar concept cars from Jaguar Cars

- Jaguar R-Coupe — 2001
- Jaguar R-D6 — 2003

== See also ==
- Jaguar (disambiguation)
- R (disambiguation)
