= Jaguar XK (X150) =

Jaguar XK; Jaguar XKR
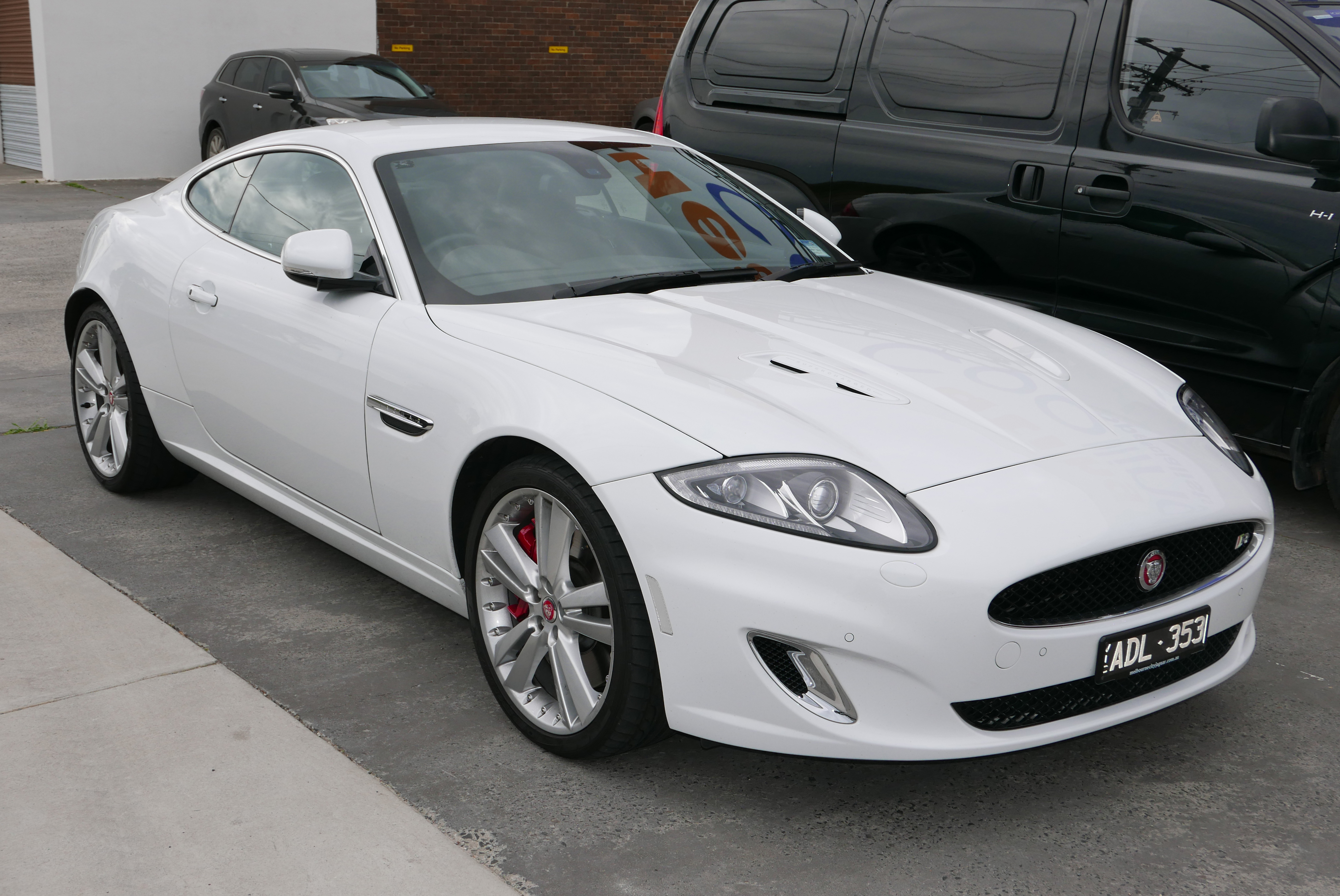
- Jaguar XKR (X150; post-facelift)

Overview
- Manufacturer: Jaguar Cars
- Model code: X150
- Production: December 2005 – July 2014; 27,612 produced
- Model years: 2006–2015
- Assembly: United Kingdom: Castle Bromwich, Birmingham (Castle Bromwich Assembly)
- Designer: Ian Callum (2002)

Body and chassis
- Class: Grand tourer (S)
- Body style: 3-door liftback coupé; 2-door convertible
- Layout: Front-mid-engine, rear-wheel-drive
- Related: Jaguar XJ (X350)

Powertrain
- Engine: 3.5 L AJ V8 (German, Italian, Dutch, and Belgian markets only.); 4.2 L AJ34 V8; 4.2 L AJ34S supercharged V8; 5.0 L AJ-V8 Gen III V8; 5.0 L AJ-V8 Gen III supercharged V8
- Transmission: 6-speed ZF 6HP26 automatic

Dimensions
- Wheelbase: 2,750 mm (108.3 in)
- Length: 2007–2009: 4,790 mm (188.6 in); 2010–2014: 4,793 mm (188.7 in)
- Width: 1,892 mm (74.5 in)
- Height: 1,320 mm (52.0 in); XK Convertible: 1,328 mm (52.3 in)
- Kerb weight: Coupé: 1,595 kg (3,516 lb); Convertible: 1,675 kg (3,693 lb)

Chronology
- Predecessor: Jaguar XK (X100)
- Successor: Jaguar F-Type

The Jaguar XK (project code X150) is the second and final generation of the Jaguar XK 2+2 grand tourer manufactured and marketed by British automobile manufacturer Jaguar Cars under the X150 internal designation. The three-door fastback coupé debuted at the 2005 Frankfurt Motor Show with the 4.2-litre V8 engine of its predecessor, and the two-door convertible debuted in 2006 at the North American International Auto Show.

The X150 is noted for its all-aluminium construction and its styling by Ian Callum, with details evoking prominent earlier Jaguar models, e.g., the Sayer nose recalling the XP/11 sports racing prototype of 1953 and adopted for the D-type – and the grille located badge recalling the E-type.

A facelifted XK was launched in 2009 with a new 5.0-litre V8. The production of the XK ended in July 2014 without a replacement model.

== Overview ==
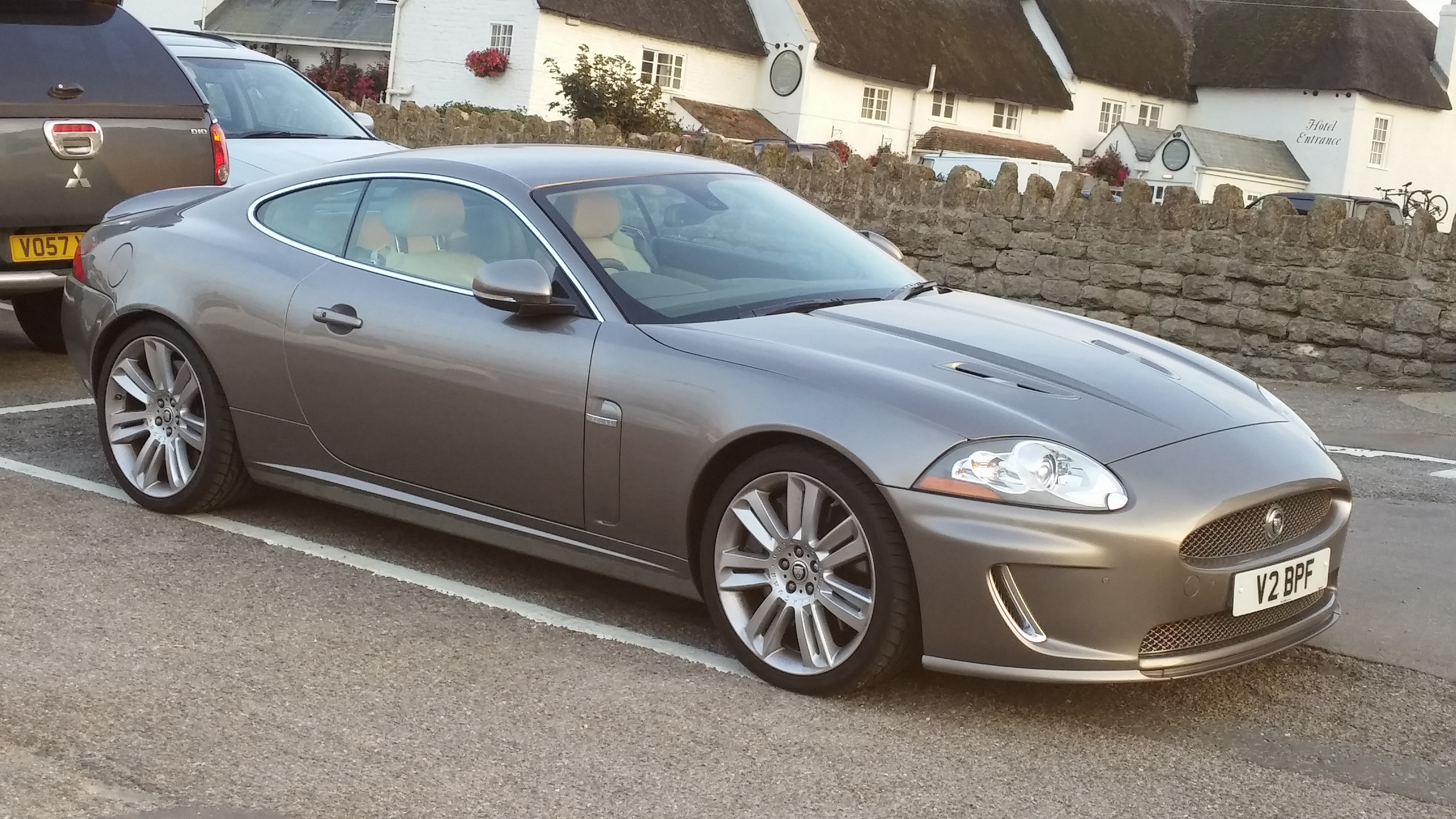

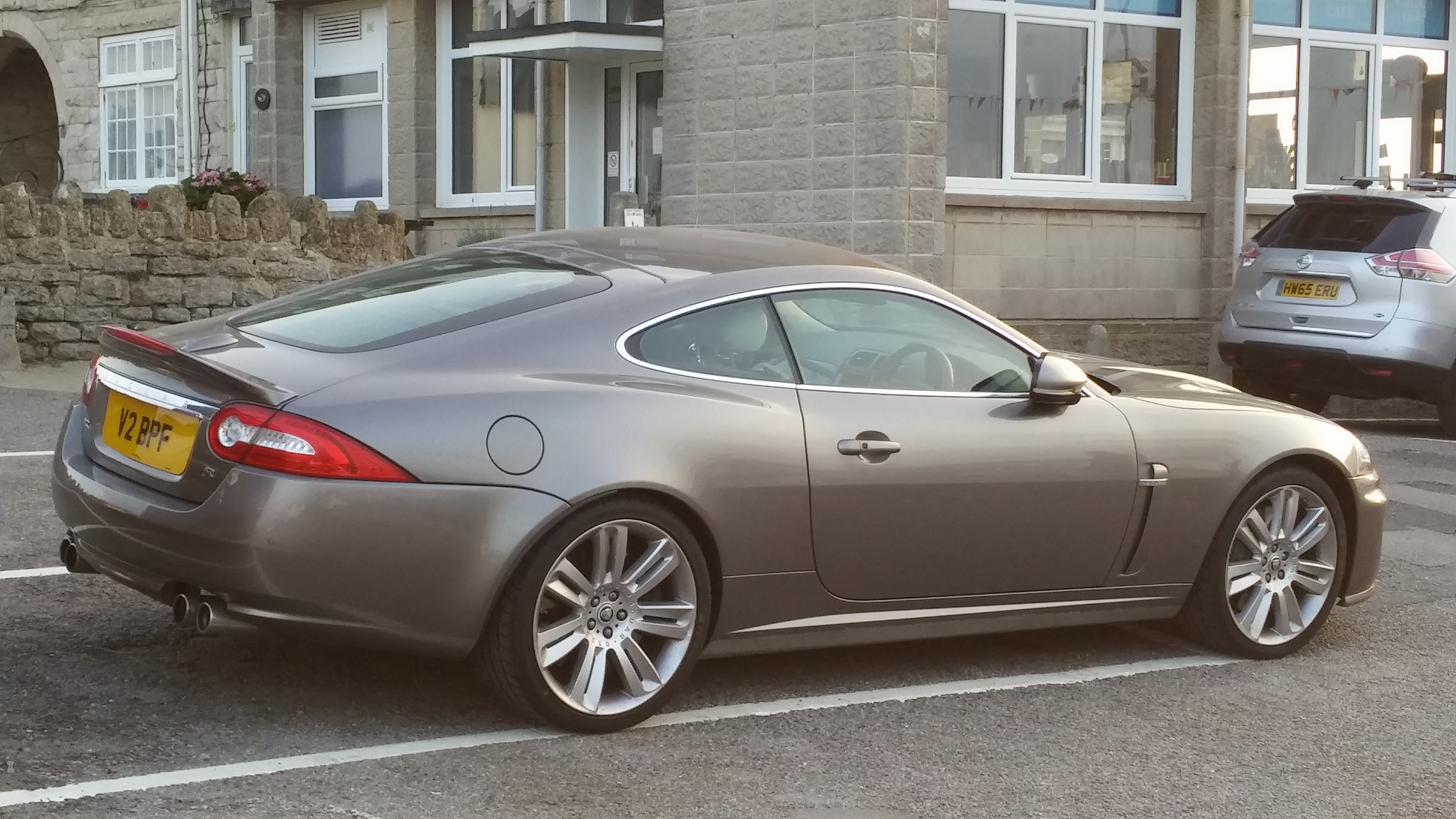
Jaguar XKR

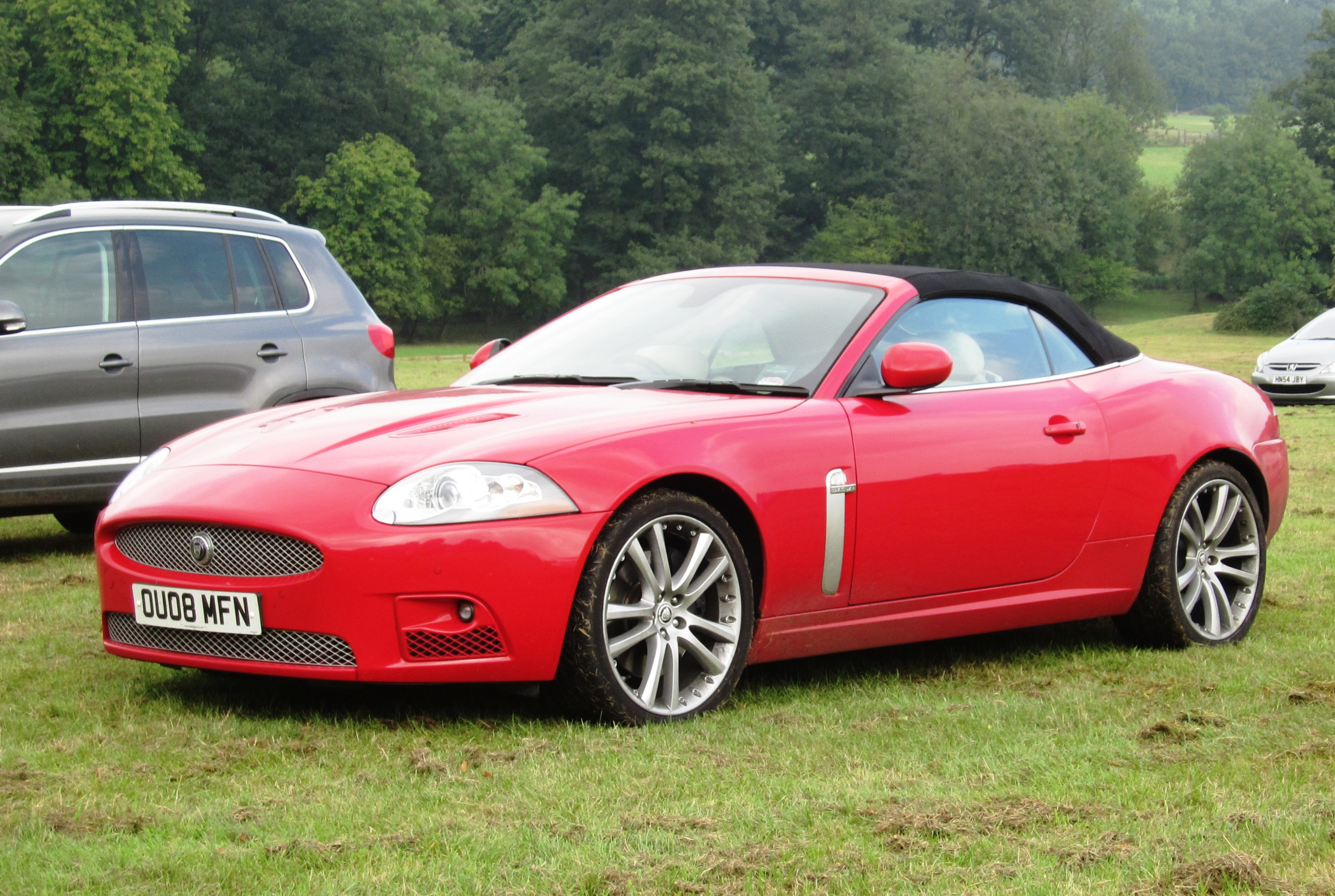
Jaguar XKR convertible

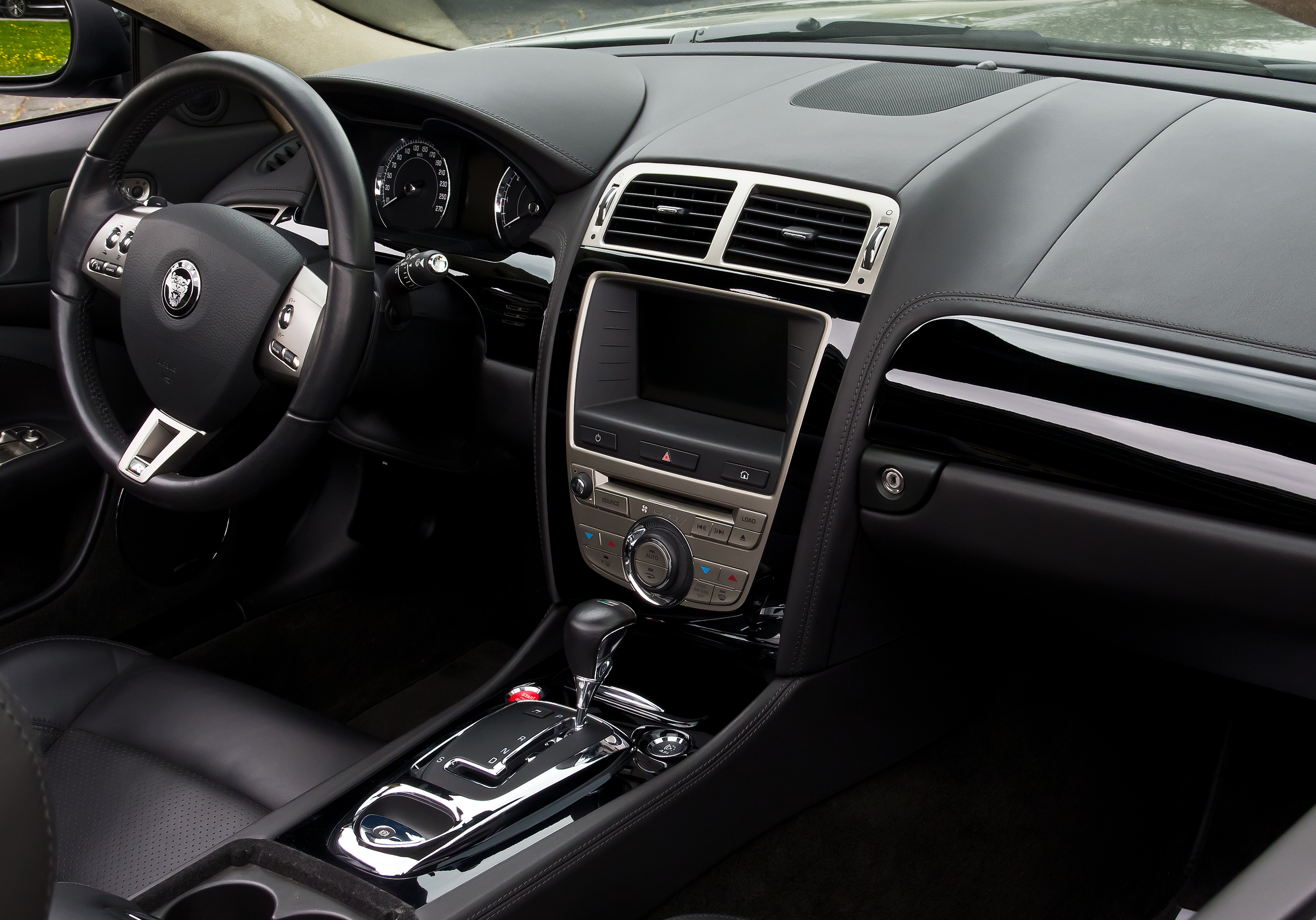
XK-R convertible interior, pre-facelift model

The X150's design was completed in 2002 and was previewed by Advanced Lightweight Coupé (ALC) which was first seen at the 2005 North American International Auto Show. The designer, Ian Callum, was also responsible for the Aston Martin DB7 and Vanquish grand tourers. The X150's grille is inspired by that of the 1961 E-Type. Introduced in the market in 2006, the X150 has a bonded and riveted aluminium monocoque chassis shared with the XJ and uses an all-aluminium construction. The X150 was the second Jaguar automobile assembled at the newly acquired Castle Bromwich plant alongside the XJ saloon. The X150, as compared to the X100 is 61.0 mm (2.4 in) wider and has 162.6 mm (6.4 in) longer wheelbase. It is also 91 kg (200 lb) lighter than the X100 due to its aluminium construction resulting in performance and fuel consumption improvements. The 4.2-litre V8 engine was carried over from its predecessor and is mated to a 6-speed automatic transmission manufactured by ZF Friedrichshafen. Like the X100, the X150 has wood trim on the interior offered as standard equipment, however it is much subdued from the X100 wood trim. A notable feature on the interior was steering column mounted shift paddles for easier gear changes. A more powerful XKR version having a supercharged variant of the engine was introduced in 2007. Aesthetic differences as compared to the XK include four-way dual exhausts, redesigned front bumper and hood louvres for improved engine airflow, and distinctive Jaguar “R” logos and badges in the interior and exterior.

The X150 convertible shares the same engine options as the coupé and features a conventional cloth top that requires 18 seconds for operation.

The XK received a facelift in 2009, with minor alterations to front and rear lights and bumper designs, together with the introduction of a new 5.0-litre V8 for both the naturally aspirated XK and the supercharged XKR. The interior also received some changes, in particular the introduction of the XF style rotary gear selector mated to the new ZF automatic transmission. In 2010, Jaguar added the Speed Pack option, with aerodynamic bodykit and speed limiter increased to 280 km/h (174 mph), and the Black Pack, with black wheels and trim. The XK received a second and more minor facelift in 2011 with new front bumper and light design, which was presented at the New York Auto Show.

The range was extended in 2011, with the introduction of the new and powerful XKR-S at the Geneva Motor Show, featuring an upgraded XKR engine generating a maximum power output of 405 kW; 542 hp (550 PS), and 680 N⋅m (502 lb⋅ft) of torque. The XKR-S badge was first used on the 2008 special edition XK. Jaguar claimed that this new version was the fastest production Jaguar ever at the time of its introduction, having a top speed of 300 km/h (186 mph) and accelerating from 0-97 km/h (60 mph) in 4.2 seconds (0-100 km/h (62 mph) in 4.4 seconds).

== Specifications ==
=== Engines ===
Model	Years	Type (displacement, bore x stroke)	Power, torque	Acceleration 0–100 km/h (0-62 mph)(seconds)	Top speed
4.2 litre AJ-V8 (AJ34)	2006–2008	4,196 cc (256 cu in) 86.0 mm (3.39 in)x90.3 mm (3.56 in)	300 PS (221 kW; 296 hp) SAE) at 6,000 rpm, 420 N⋅m (310 lb⋅ft) SAE) at 4,100 rpm	5.4 Coupé, 5.5 Convertible	250 km/h (155 mph) (limited)
4.2 litre Supercharged V8 (AJ34S)	2006–2008	4,196 cc (256 cu in) 86.0 mm (3.39 in)x90.3 mm (3.56 in)	416 PS (306 kW; 410 hp) at 6,250 rpm, 560 N⋅m (413 lb⋅ft) at 3,500 rpm	4.9 Coupé, 5.0 Convertible	250 km/h (155 mph) (limited)
4.2 litre Supercharged V8 (XKR-S)	2008	4,196 cc (256 cu in) 86.0 mm (3.39 in)x90.3 mm (3.56 in)	420 PS (309 kW; 414 hp), 560 N⋅m (413 lb⋅ft)	4.8	280 km/h (174 mph) (limited)
5.0 litre AJ-V8 GEN III V8	2009–2014	5,000 cc (305 cu in) 92.5 mm (3.64 in)x93 mm (3.7 in)	385 PS (283 kW; 380 hp) at 6,500 rpm, 515 N⋅m (380 lbf⋅ft) at 3,500 rpm	5.2 Coupé, 5.3 Convertible	250 km/h (155 mph) (limited)
5.0 litre AJ-V8 GEN III R supercharged V8	2009–2014	5,000 cc (305 cu in) 92.5 mm (3.64 in)x93 mm (3.7 in)	510 PS (375 kW; 503 hp) at 6,000-6,500 rpm, 625 N⋅m (461 lbf⋅ft) at 2,500-5,500 rpm	4.6	250 km/h (155 mph) (limited)
5.0 litre AJ-V8 GEN III R (XKR-S) supercharged V8	2011	5,000 cc (305 cu in) 92.5 mm (3.64 in)x93 mm (3.7 in)	550 PS (405 kW; 542 hp) at 6,000-6,500 rpm, 680 N⋅m (502 lbf⋅ft) at 2,500-5,500 rpm	4.0	300 km/h (186 mph) (limited)
5.0 litre AJ-V8 GEN III R (XKR 75) supercharged V8	2010	5,000 cc (305 cu in) 92.5 mm (3.64 in)x93 mm (3.7 in)	530 PS (390 kW; 523 hp) at 6,000-6,500 rpm, 655 N⋅m (483 lbf⋅ft) at 2,500-5,500 rpm	4.4	280 km/h (174 mph) (limited)
5.0 litre AJ-V8 GEN III R (XKR 175) supercharged V8	2010	5,000 cc (305 cu in) 92.5 mm (3.64 in)x93 mm (3.7 in)	510 PS (375 kW; 503 hp) at 6,000-6,500 rpm, 625 N⋅m (461 lbf⋅ft) at 2,500-5,500 rpm	4.6	280 km/h (174 mph) (limited)

Note: All AJ-V8 Gen III V8 engines, and the Jaguar XKR-S engine, are SAE rated.

Jaguar XKR X150 5.0 L Supercharged

=== Transmission ===
All 4.2-litre models were fitted with a six-speed ZF 6HP26 automatic transmission with Jaguar Sequential Shift and J-gate gear selector. All 5.0-litre models were fitted with a six-speed ZF 6HP28 and the JaguarDrive rotary gear selector.

== 2011 facelift ==
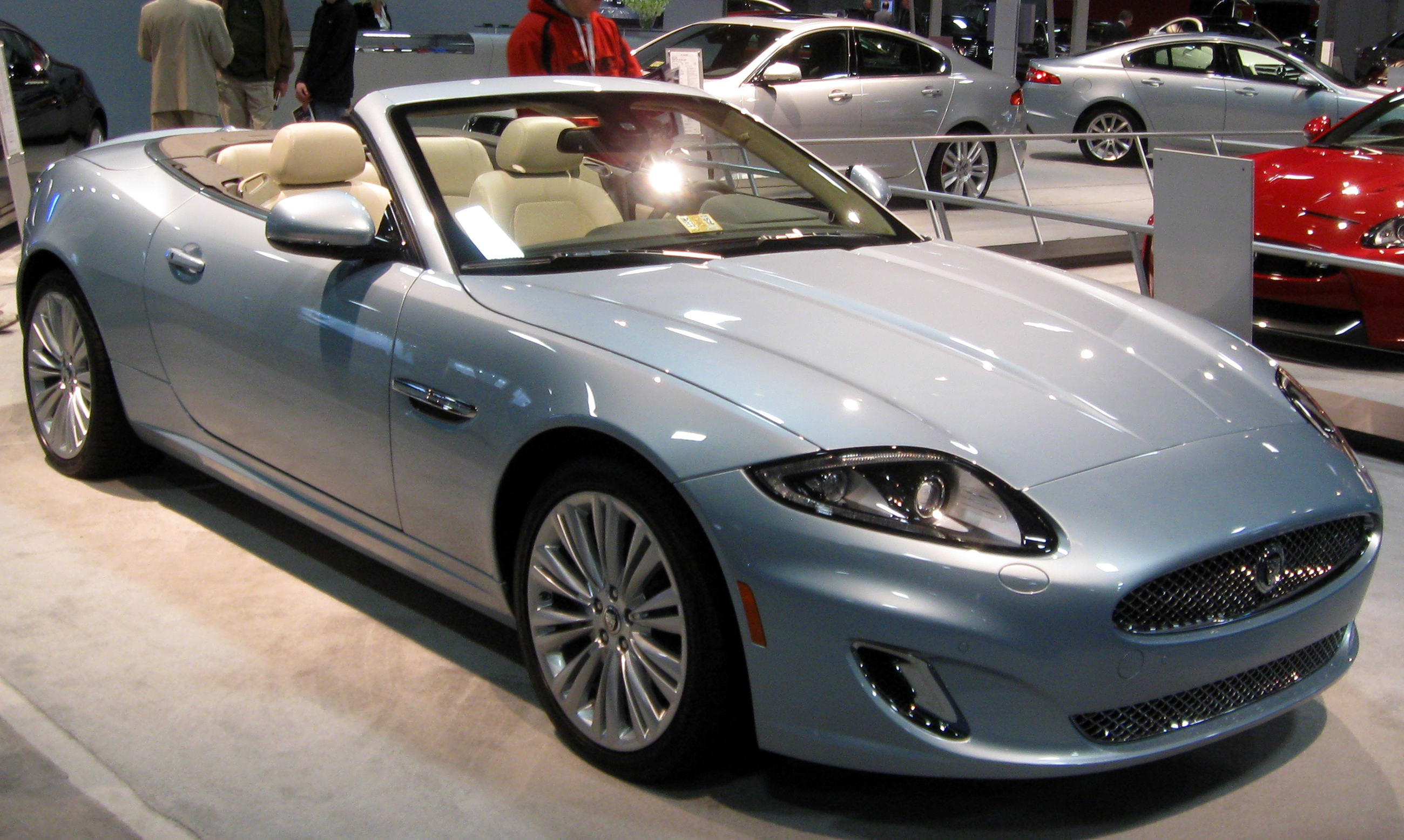
Facelift Jaguar XKR convertible

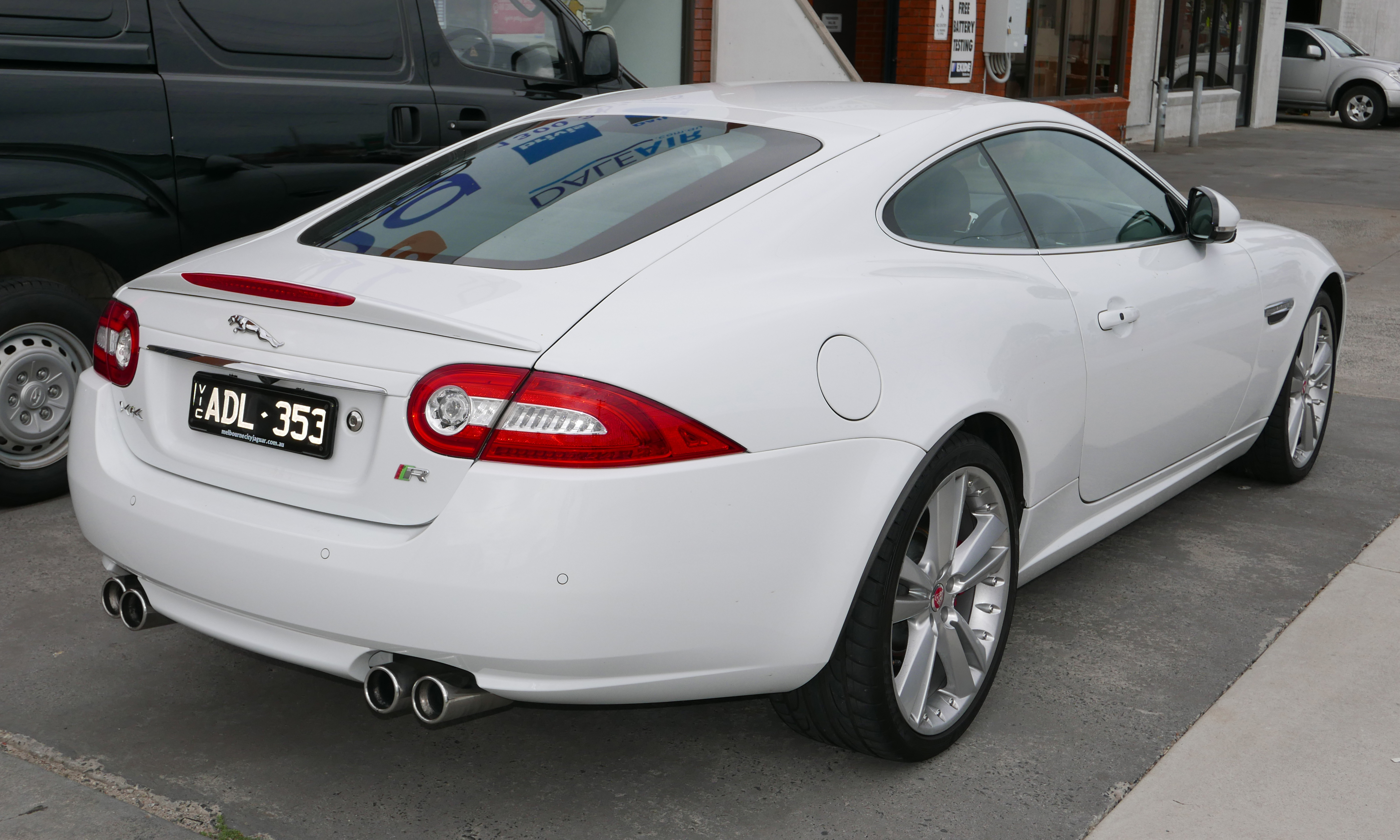
Facelift Jaguar XKR coupé (rear view)

In March 2011, on the launch of the XKR-S at the Geneva Motor Show, Jaguar revealed the details of a facelift for the 2012 XK MY. The new specification included front and rear styling changes and internal trim changes with navigation system and a backup camera included as standard equipment.

In addition to standard XK and XKR, the revised body shape formed the basis for the following models.

=== XK and XKR Special Edition ===
The XK and XKR Special editions were unveiled exclusively for the European and the UK markets. They include the use of tactile 'scraffito' finished leather on the front seats, instrument binnacle, door and rear quarter casings; Poltrona Frau leather headlinings with Shadow Walnut and Dark Figured Aluminium veneer, 525W Bowers & Wilkins sound system, 16 by 16 way adjustable heated Performance seats, a heated steering wheel and keyless entry/start, choice of Celestial Black, with Crystal Blue, Lunar Grey, Polaris White, Rhodium Silver and Ultimate Black body colour; two new 20-inch alloy wheel options (Venom, Orona).

=== XKR-S ===
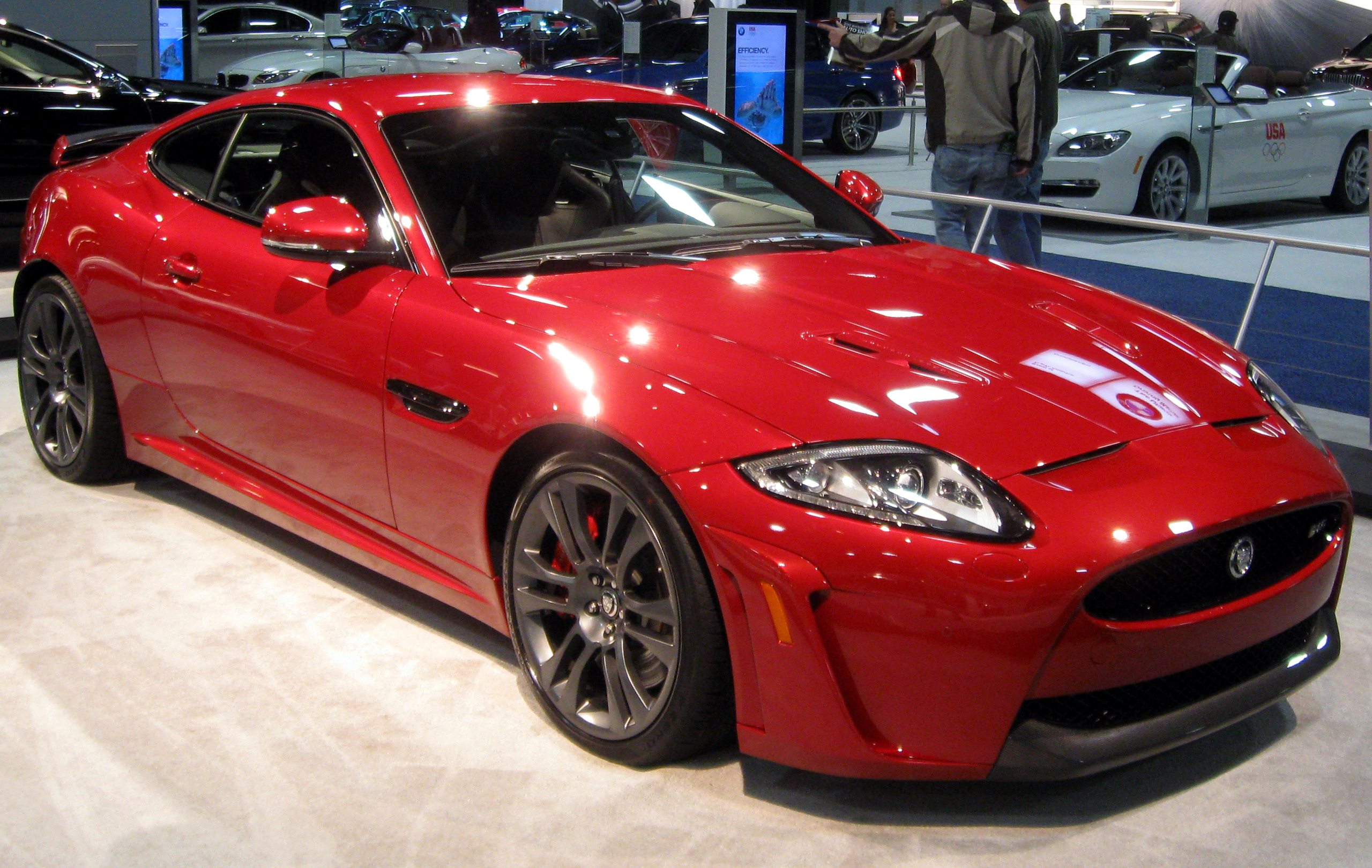
Jaguar XKR-S

Unveiled at the 2011 Geneva Motor Show, the XKR-S is a high performance version of the XKR. Notable changes over the standard XKR include a supercharged AJ-V8 Gen III R direct-injection V8 engine having a maximum power output of 405 kW; 542 hp (550 PS) at 6,000 to 6,500 rpm and 680 N⋅m (502 lbf⋅ft) of torque at 2,500 to 5,500 rpm, an increased top speed of 300 km/h (186 mph), active sports exhaust, a bespoke suspension system, 16-way adjustable memory sports seats with carbon fibre effect leather, reprogrammed Adaptive Dynamics, 20-inch Vulcan wheels and Pirelli P-Zero tyres along with Jaguar's High Performance Braking System.

=== XK Dynamic R, XK Signature (2014) ===
The XK Dynamic R was a 'run out' version of the XKR with the Black Dynamic Pack and included stiffer suspension, a 10 mm ride height drop and bodykit extensions from the Speed Pack. It also had an increased top speed of 280 km/h (174 mph).

The XK Signature is a special version of the XK with the V8 engine tuned to 283 kW; 380 hp (385 PS) along with 20-inch Kalimnos alloy wheels (optional 20-inch Takoba), leather upholstery, Canvas Suede cloth headlining, Figured Ebony veneers, leather seat in Ivory or Charcoal, reversing camera, metal sports pedals.

=== Limited editions ===
==== XKR-S GT (2013) ====
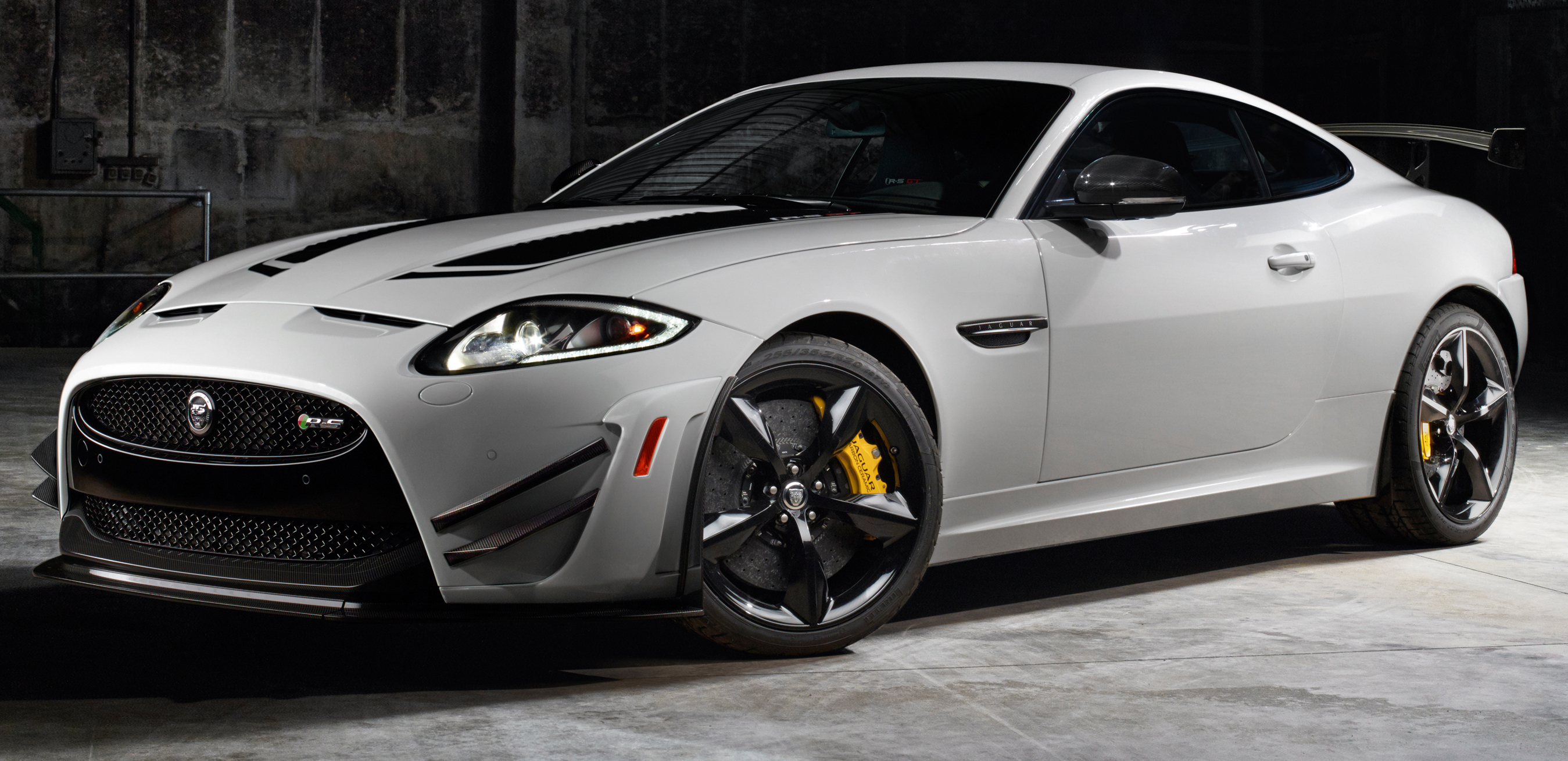
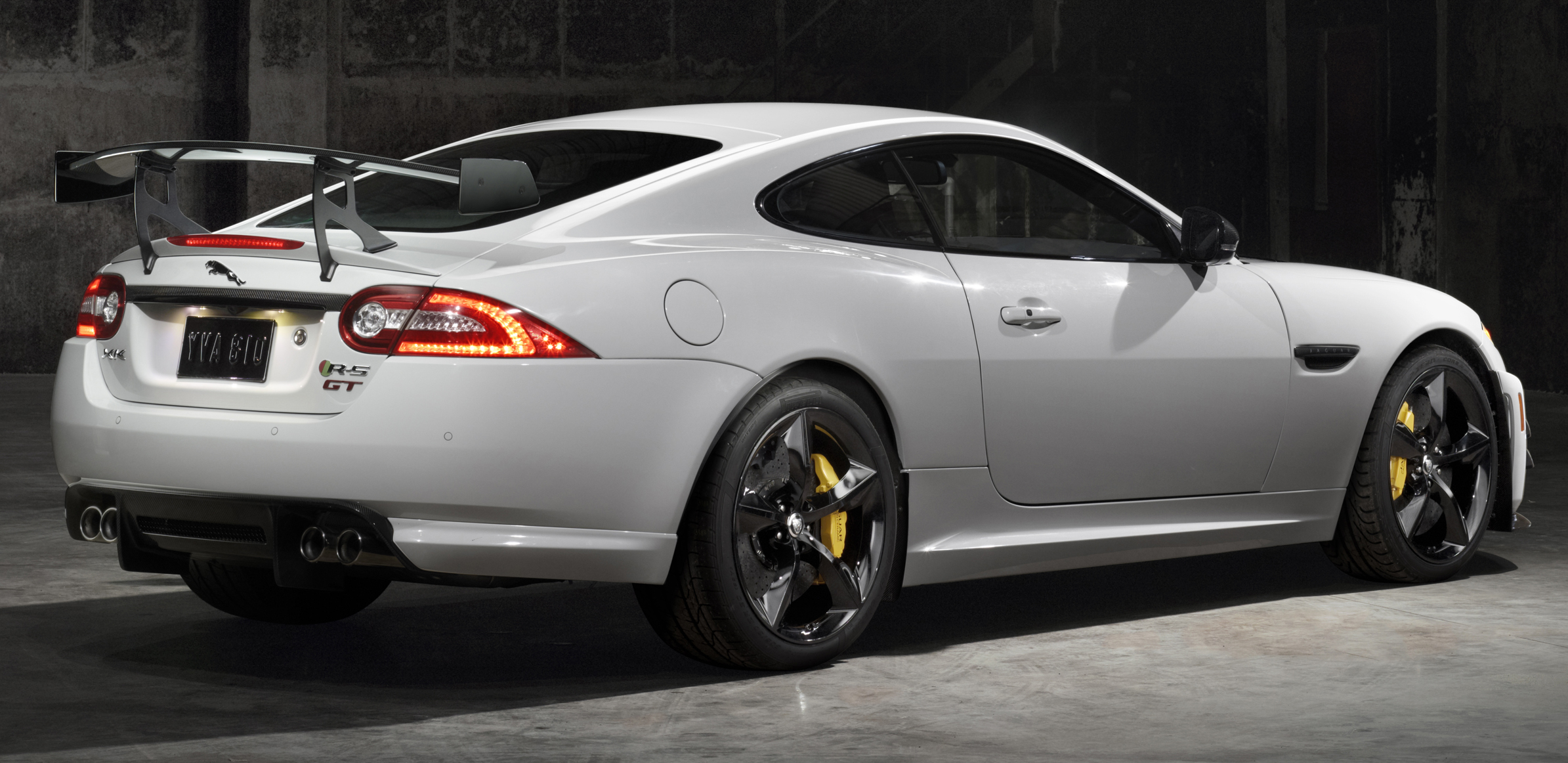
Jaguar XKR-S GT

The XKR-S GT is a limited (30 units in United States and Canada, 10 units in the UK; worldwide production was 45 units) version of XKR-S coupé. Technical highlights included a six-speed transmission, active electronic differential, bespoke aerodynamic components and suspension developments to increase downforce and optimised high-speed cornering ability (a wider front track, increased camber, revised bushings, a new steering system and faster steering ratio, height-adjustable and bespoke adaptive dampers with twin spring system and increased rates of 68% at the front and 25% at the rear), a carbon ceramic brake system (398 mm and 380 mm front/rear discs, 6/4-piston front/rear monoblock calipers)

The car was unveiled by Jaguar in 2013 at the New York International Auto Show, followed by the 2013 Goodwood Festival of Speed.

Delivery to UK customers commenced in October 2013.

==== Final Fifty (2014) ====
Jaguar announced a special limited edition to mark the end of XK production. Only 50 were sold, all in the US. The Final Fifty is based on the XKR with Dynamic Pack. The exterior is identifiable by an extra-louvered hood inspired by the XKR-S GT, "Vortex" 20-inch wheels, a rear wing, side sill extensions, and a rear diffuser. The Final Fifty cars are split evenly in 25 coupe and 25 convertible body styles and all cars were fitted with a commemorative plaque signed by the then Jaguar's chief designer Ian Callum.

=== Models ===
Models	XK	XK Portfolio	XKR	XKR-S
Engines	5.0 L	5.0 L	5.0 L Supercharged 375 kW (510 PS)	5.0 L supercharged 405 kW (550 PS)
Wheels (standard)	Venus 18-inch alloy	Caravela 19-inch alloy	Tamana 19-inch alloy (base), Kasuga 20-inch alloy (speed pack), Vulcan 20-inch alloy (dynamic(+black) pack), Kalimnos 20-inch alloy ((speed+) black pack)	Vulcan 20-inch alloy (Dark Technical Finish)
Body Style	Coupé, Convertible	Coupé, Convertible	Coupé (base, speed, dynamic, black), Convertible (base, speed, black)	Coupé, Convertible

=== Transmission ===
All 5.0 models are fitted with a six-speed ZF 6HP28 automatic transmission and the JaguarDrive rotary gear selector.

== Special models ==
=== XKR Portfolio (2008) ===
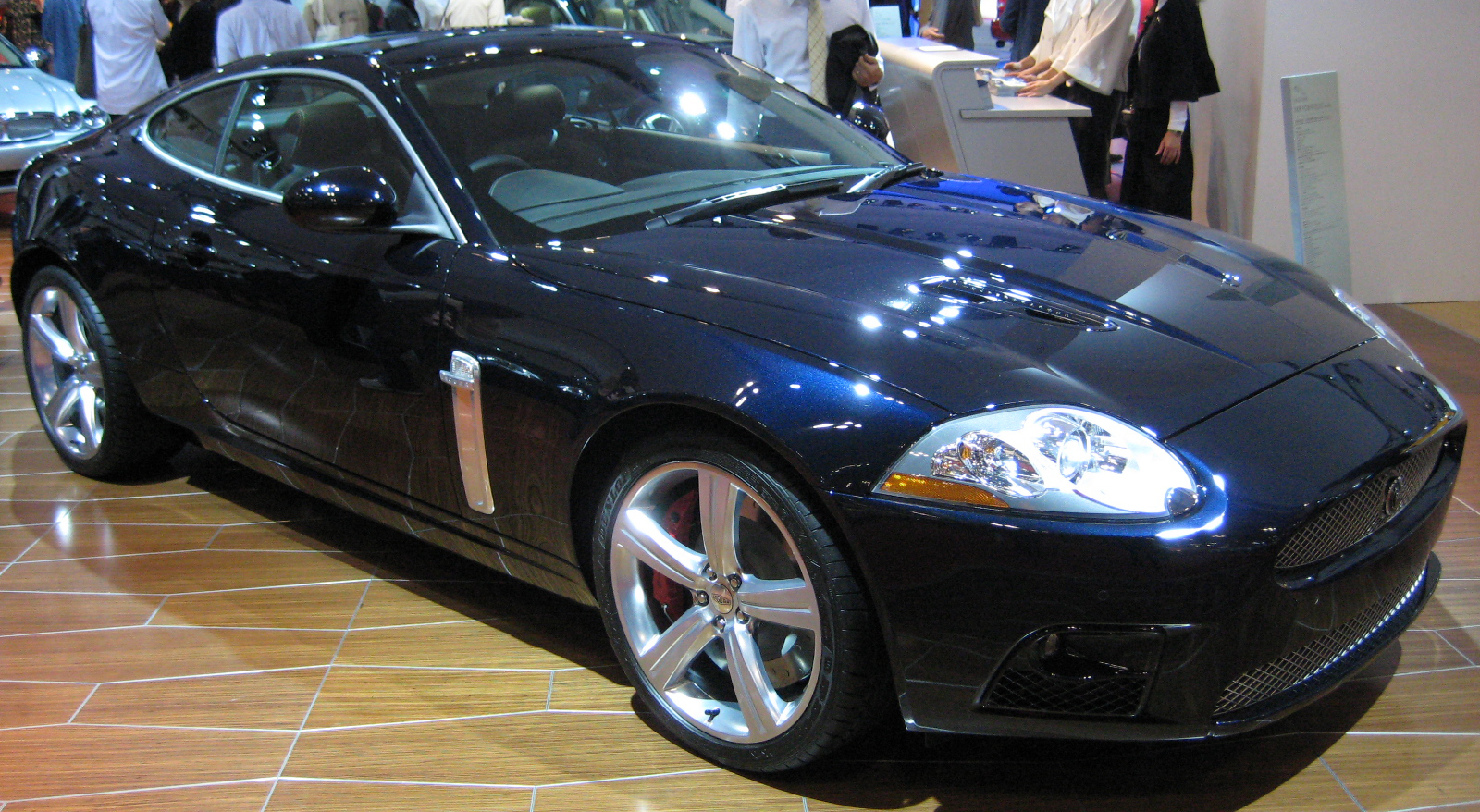
Jaguar XKR Portfolio Edition

The 2008 XKR Portfolio is a version of the XKR developed by Jaguar's Special Vehicles team and Alcon, it is often incorrectly referred to as a 2007 model due to being built and first sold in 2007. It includes 400 mm diameter front and 350 mm rear brake discs, six-piston front calipers and four-piston rear calipers, 20-inch five-spoke BBS wheels, power vents, a Celestial Black body colour (optional Liquid Silver for UK and Switzerland models), Engine-Spun aluminium veneer or optional Satin American Walnut veneer, an alloy and leather gearshift selector, soft-grab door handles, contrast stitching throughout the cabin, leather-edged mats with Jaguar logos, Portfolio treadplates on the doorsills and a 525 W Premium Audio system with Dolby Pro Logic II surround sound system by Bowers & Wilkins.

=== XKR-S (2009) ===
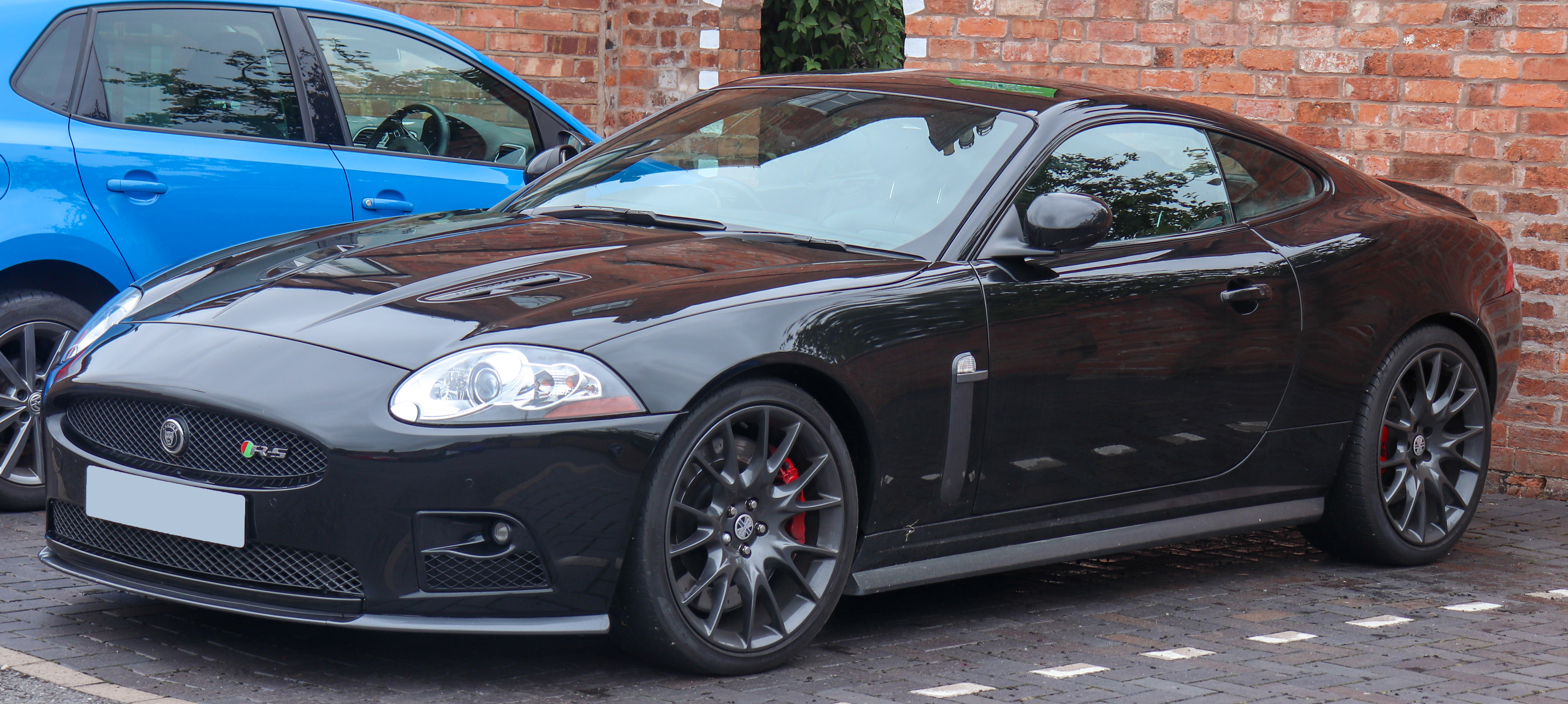
Jaguar XKR-S

The XKR-S is a limited production (200 units) version of the XKR coupé for the European market, 50 units were built in RHD for the UK, 150 units were built in LHD, it was not sold outside of the UK or EU. It was a 2009 model year vehicle but built in 2008. The model was developed by Jaguar's Special Vehicles team in collaboration with British competition brake specialist Alcon and has an electronically limited top speed of 280 km/h (174 mph). The additional performance was achieved through improved aerodynamics (reduced drag and lift) and a revised suspension set-up. Other changes include an S Alcon R Performance braking system with 400 mm diameter front and 350 mm rear brake discs, six-piston front calipers and four-piston rear calipers, recalibrated suspension, Ultimate Black body colour, XKR-S badging on the rear of the car, a 10 mm lower ride height, 20-inch Vortex forged alloy wheels with bespoke tyres, an active exhaust system, leather upholstery with Charcoal with Ivory twin-needle contrast stitching, Piano Black veneer and a Charcoal Alston luxury headliner.

The car was unveiled at the 2008 Geneva Motor Show and later shown at the 2008 Paris Motor Show. The production version went on sale in the Summer of 2008.

This special edition (with a 4.2-litre V8 engine) should not be confused with the later introduced 2012 XKR-S featuring a 5.0-litre V8 engine, which was launched in 2011.

=== XK60 (2008) ===
The XK60 is a special version of the XK for the UK market built to commemorate the 60th anniversary of the XK120. Notable changes include 20-inch Senta alloy wheels, a sporty alloy gear knob and selector-gate surround, plus distinctive body enhancements: a new front spoiler and rear valance panel, chrome-finished side vents along with bright upper and lower front grille meshes, special tailpipe finishes and appliqués on both sides of the car.

==== XKR 'Goodwood Special' (2009) ====
Based on the standard XKR, the XKR 'Goodwood Special' is a prototype designed to explore the sportier side of the XKR's character and allow Jaguar's engineering team to extend performance boundaries. Unveiled at the 2009 Goodwood Festival of Speed, the engine was uprated to generate a maximum power output of 390 kW; 523 hp (530 PS) and 700 N⋅m (516 lbf⋅ft) of torque. The car featured a louder exhaust, 21-inch alloy wheels and a lowered ride-height as well as a Lime Green body colour and satin graphite detailing on the front grilles, headlights, door mirrors, side window surrounds, rear signature blade and bonnet louvres.

=== XKR 75 Goodwood LE (2010) ===
Unveiled at the 2010 Goodwood Festival of Speed, the XKR 75 Goodwood LE is a limited production (75 units, 20 RHD and 55 LHD) version of the XKR commemorating the company's 75th anniversary. The car featured an upgraded engine with an uprated power output of 390 kW; 523 hp (530 PS) and 655 N⋅m (483 lbf⋅ft) torque, as well as increased top speed of 280 km/h (174 mph) [though at least some cars have further increased top speed of 300 km/h (186 mph)]. It also features an upgraded torque converter, upgraded suspension, an aerodynamic body pack with body coloured finish for the front splitter, side sills extensions and rear diffuser, body coloured larger rear spoiler and rear trunk lid finish; sports exhaust with improved performance and acoustics, Stratus Grey exterior paint with optional graphics pack; red brake callipers, 20-inch Vortex forged lightweight alloy wheels, XKR performance interior in Charcoal and Ivory stitch leather with Jet suede cloth headlining with XKR 75 tread plate and active front lighting. The car was tuned and calibrated in partnership with the RSR engineering team.

UK models went on sale in July 2010 with delivery in October of the same year.

=== XKR 175 (2010) ===
Unveiled at the Monterey Jet Center during the Pebble Beach Automotive Weekend, the XKR 175 is a limited production version of the XKR for the North American market, built to commemorate the company's 75th anniversary. Notable changes include an increased top speed of 280 km/h (174 mph), a revised aerodynamic package incorporating a new front air dam, new side sills, a new rear diffuser and a larger rear spoiler providing increased balance and a reduction in lift; 20-inch Kasuga ten-spoke alloy wheels, red brake calipers along with Ultimate Black body colour; Warm Charcoal with Cranberry stitching leather seats and Piano Black wood veneer on the interior.

A total of 175 cars were exported to the US, as well as another 15 to Canada.

=== XK E-Type 50th Anniversary Edition (2011) ===
Commissioned by Jaguar Italy, the Italian dealer of Jaguar Cars, the XK E-Type Anniversary Edition was a limited production variant of the XK built to commemorate the 50th anniversary of the E-Type. Unveiled in 2011, the car features special Black Cherry Colour along with a black bonnet and 19-inch Tamana heritage alloy wheels with red Jaguar badging. Other exterior features include chrome bits on the front grille, wing mirrors, air intakes and window surrounds. The interior featured unique upholstery in Ivory and Charcoal leather along with a special "Jaguar Heritage" logo on the headrest, and aluminium inserts in "Engine Spin" finish. All of the 50 customers purchasing the cars were given an opportunity to drive the E-Type for one week.

Also in other countries this XK E-Type Anniversary Edition (E50) was sold to customers in limited volume. In Switzerland 50 units of XK E50 edition cars were sold, 25 coupés and 25 convertibles.

The XK E50 cars have an additional "E50" badge on the left side of the boot lid, just below the standard "XK" badge.

=== XK and XKR Poltrona Frau Artisan (2011) ===
The Poltrona Frau was a special trim level exclusive to the UK and European markets on the XK and the XKR with Poltrona Frau leather upholstery in "scraffito" finish – including the door panels, headliner, seats and dashboard.

The edition was offered in navy blue or truffle brown with aluminium or walnut wood trim along with heated sports seats, a 525-watt Bowers and Wilkins sound system, unique sill plates, stainless-steel pedals, choice of two 20-inch wheels, six special interior colours and four soft top colours (for the convertible).

== Production and worldwide Sales ==
Production of the XK began in early 2006 and ended in July 2014 without a replacement model.

Total sales are from 2009. The sales figures for 2015 and 2016 consist of dealer stocks.

Year	2009	2010	2011	2012	2013	2014	2015	2016	Total
Units sold	6,039	5,454	4,894	4,166	3,223	3,341	492	3	27,612

== Awards ==
The XK won the Top Gear magazine "GT of the Year" and "Car of the Year" awards in 2006. It was also awarded the Engineering and Technology Award at the Prince Michael International Road Safety Awards in London. The convertible version made the Top Gear cool wall under sub zero.
