= Ian Callum =

British car designer (born 1954)

Ian Callum CBE FRSE RDI
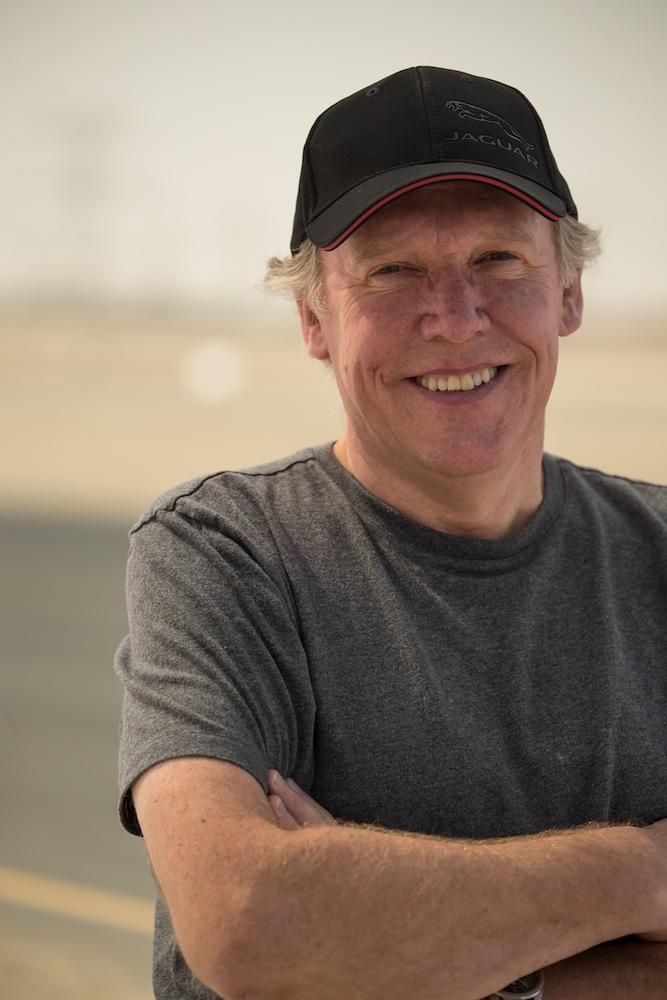
- Callum in 2013
- Born: Ian Stuart Callum; 30 July 1954 (age 72); Dumfries, Scotland
- Education: Royal College of Art
- Occupation: Car designer
- Employer: Jaguar Land Rover
- Website: callumdesigns.com

Ian Stuart Callum (born 30 July 1954) is a British car designer who has worked for Ford, TWR, and Aston Martin. In 1999, he became the Director of design for Jaguar Cars, and later Jaguar Land Rover; he held this position until mid 2018.

In 2019, Callum founded his own automotive and product design company, named CALLUM, where he is the Director of Design. CALLUM's first limited edition car release was the Aston Martin CALLUM Vanquish 25. GQ named Ian Callum its Car Designer of the Year at the 2021 GQ Car Awards.

== Background ==
Callum was born in Dumfries, Scotland, in 1954. In 1968 (at the age of 14) he submitted a car design to Jaguar in the hope of landing a job. Callum studied at Lanchester Polytechnic's (now Coventry University) School of Transportation Design in Coventry, Aberdeen Art College and the Glasgow School of Art, where he graduated with a degree in Industrial Design. He subsequently graduated from the Royal College of Art in London with a post-graduate master's degree in Vehicle Design.

Callum's younger brother Moray was Vice President of Design at Ford until his retirement in 2021.

== Career ==
=== Ford ===
From 1979 to 1990 Callum designed for Ford, working between Dunton, Japan, Italy and Australia, mainly on "bits of cars, mostly steering wheels". As well as working on bread-and-butter Fiestas and Mondeos, he contributed to image builders such as the RS200 and Escort RS Cosworth, the last of which he is especially proud of and with which he collaborated with fellow RCA graduate Peter Horbury. He was then appointed Design Manager responsible for the Ghia Design Studio in Turin, where he worked on the Via, Zig and Zag show car concepts.

=== TWR ===
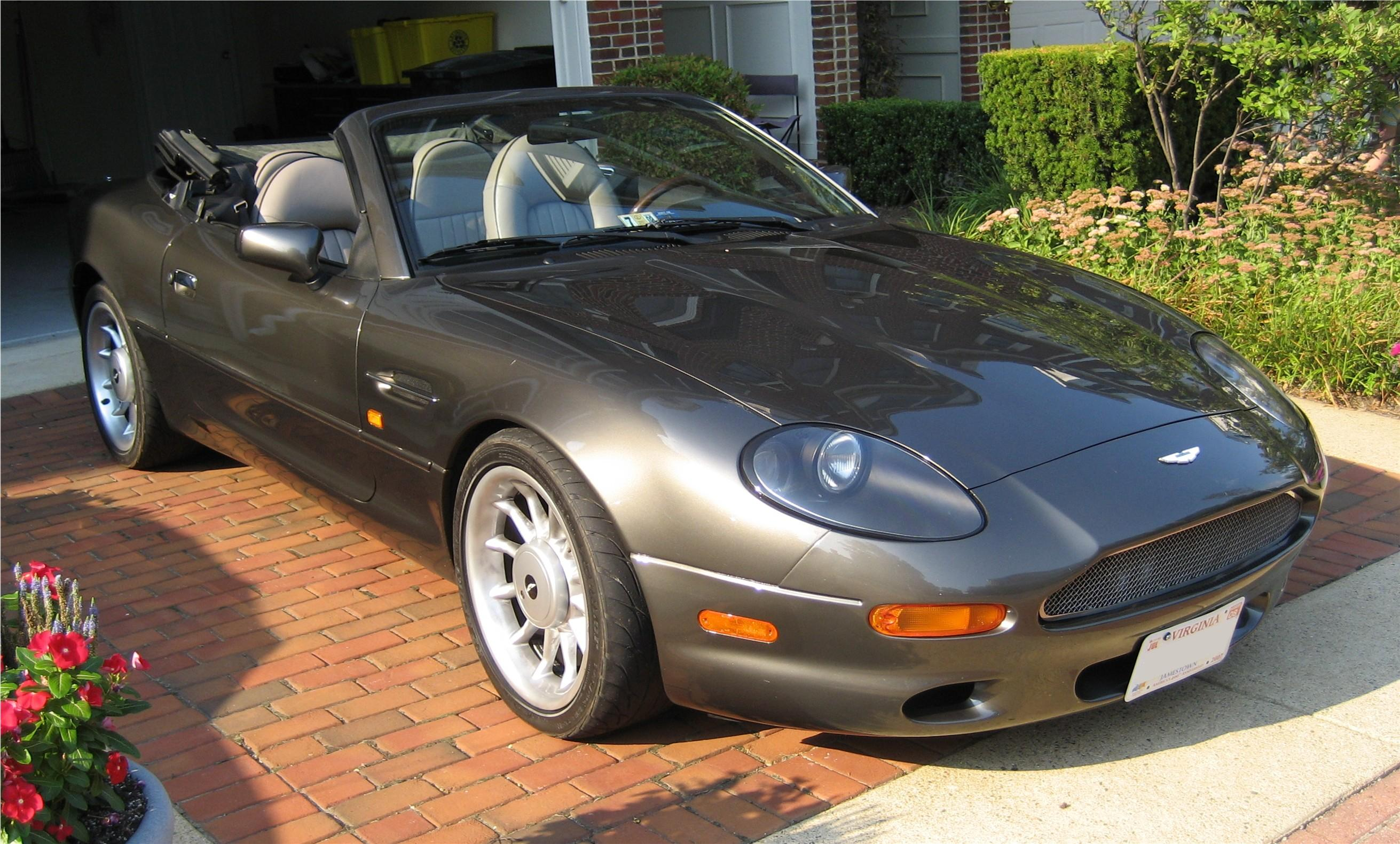
Aston Martin DB7 (1993)

After eleven years in a corporate environment, Callum left Ford in 1990 to join Peter Stevens and Tom Walkinshaw to form TWR Design. He said,

Some of my colleagues came to see me from Ford, and I’d walked away from this giant studio at Dunton, the corporation, all that stuff, into this little tin shed in Kidlington. They thought I was utterly mad. But I was as happy as could be, I was doing something I wanted to do.

In 1991 he was appointed Chief Designer and General Manager of TWR Design. During this period he was partially responsible for designing the Aston Martin DB7, which is probably the design he is currently most famous for. He also designed the Aston Martin Vanquish, the V12-powered DB7 Vantage and Aston Martin's Project Vantage concept car as well as taking responsibility for a wide range of design programs for other TWR clients, including Volvo, Mazda and HSV. He was awarded the Jim Clark Memorial Award in 1995 in recognition of his styling work on the DB7. In 1996, he designed the Volvo C70 Coupe and in 1998 the Nissan R390.

=== Jaguar ===
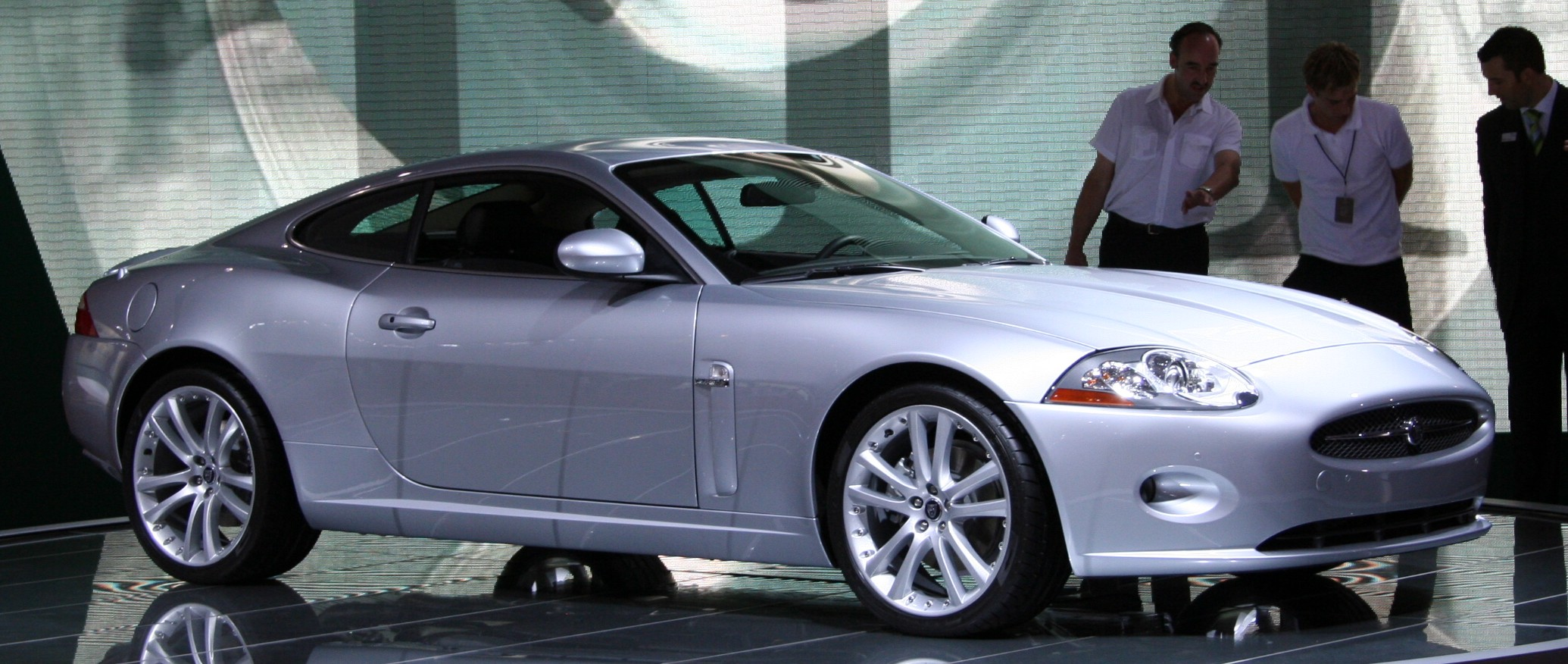
Jaguar XK (X150)

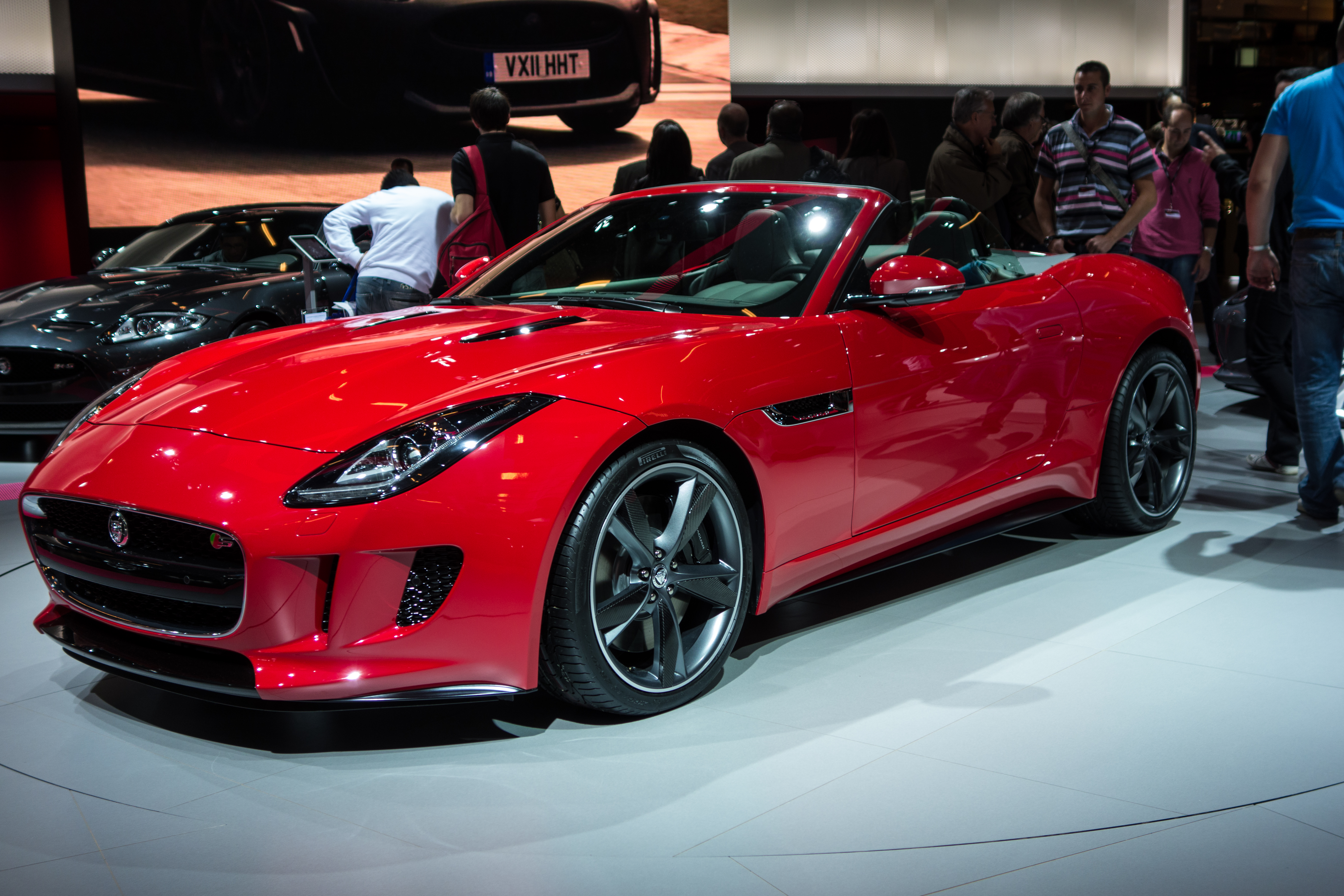
Jaguar F-Type

In 1999, on the death of Geoff Lawson, Callum was appointed to succeed him at Jaguar, which was a Ford Motor Company subsidiary at the time (now a subsidiary of Tata Group). For a short stint, Callum directed design at both Jaguar and Aston Martin. Callum has claimed that during this time he was responsible for the majority of the design of the DB9 and V8 Vantage, despite both designs officially being attributed to Henrik Fisker, the subsequent director of design at Aston Martin, upon their introduction. In an interview with Car and Driver in 2010, when asked how much of the DB9 and V8 Vantage were designed under his watch, Callum replies "The DB9, I’d say pretty much 100 percent, including the interior. Maybe not color and trim and wood finishes, but certainly the surfaces of the car. And the V-8, I would say a good 80 percent. In fact, we started the V-8 first and then shelved it while we did the DB9—that’s why they’re quite similar". At Jaguar, since the Lawson designed 2001 X-Type and 2002 XJ were well advanced his influence was initially felt through a series of concepts, the 2001 R-Coupe and 2003 R-D6. The first production Jaguar to bear his influence was the 2004 facelift of the S-Type followed by the 2004 X-Type Estate, of which he oversaw the tailgate design.

With the next generation of Jaguar models Callum took Jaguar away from the Lawson-era retroism, which produced the more traditional-looking X-Type, S-Type, and XJ, towards a new style. This began with the second generation, 2006 XK, which bears striking similarity to the Aston Martin DB9, which Callum describes as being a result of modern safety legislation. This new direction continued with the 2008 XF as previewed by the concept C-XF, which Callum describes as the 'next significant step forward' in Jaguar's design direction, and the 2010 XJ. He also oversaw the design for the 2010 C-X75 concept car, the 2012 refresh of the Jaguar XF and introduction of Sportbrake, the 2013 F-Type, the 2015 Jaguar XE, 2015 second generation Jaguar XF (the first Callum-led design to replace another Callum-led design), the 2016 Jaguar F-Pace, and the 2018 Jaguar I-Pace.

According to Callum, ‘Jaguars should be perceived as cool cars and cool cars attract interesting, edgy people.’ The quality of Callum's work at Jaguar has been acknowledged by twice Le Mans 24 hours winner and fellow Dumfries native, Allan McNish.

=== Callum ===
In early June 2019, Callum announced that he was stepping down from Jaguar but would continue with the company as a design consultant. "Designing Jaguar cars was a lifelong dream for me, and I’m delighted to remain involved as a consultant for the brand", he said in an interview. Shortly afterwards, he founded an independent automotive and product design agency, named simply Callum, based in Warwick and specialising in bespoke and limited-edition products.

In 2026 the 355 by Evoluto was released as designed by the Callum design agency. It reimagines and re-engineers the Ferarri F355 in a ‘peak analogue’ state that removes all plastics and screens from the interior and provides a tactile driving experience, limited to just 55 bespoke units.

Callum was appointed Commander of the Order of the British Empire (CBE) in the 2019 Birthday Honours for services to the British car industry.

== Notable designs ==
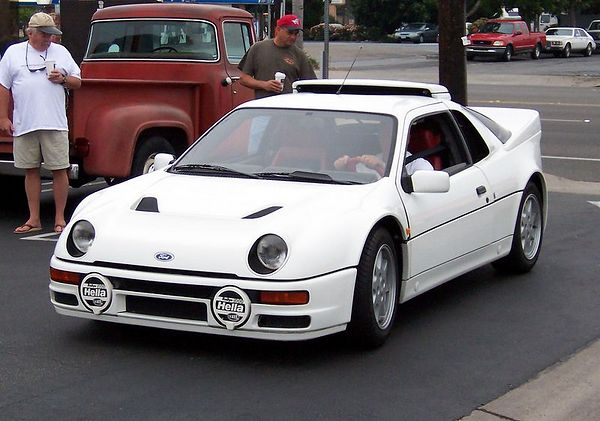
Ford RS200 (1984)

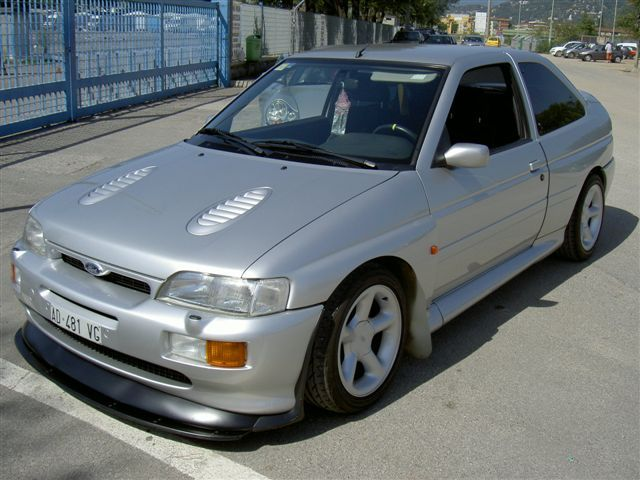
Ford Escort Cosworth (1989)

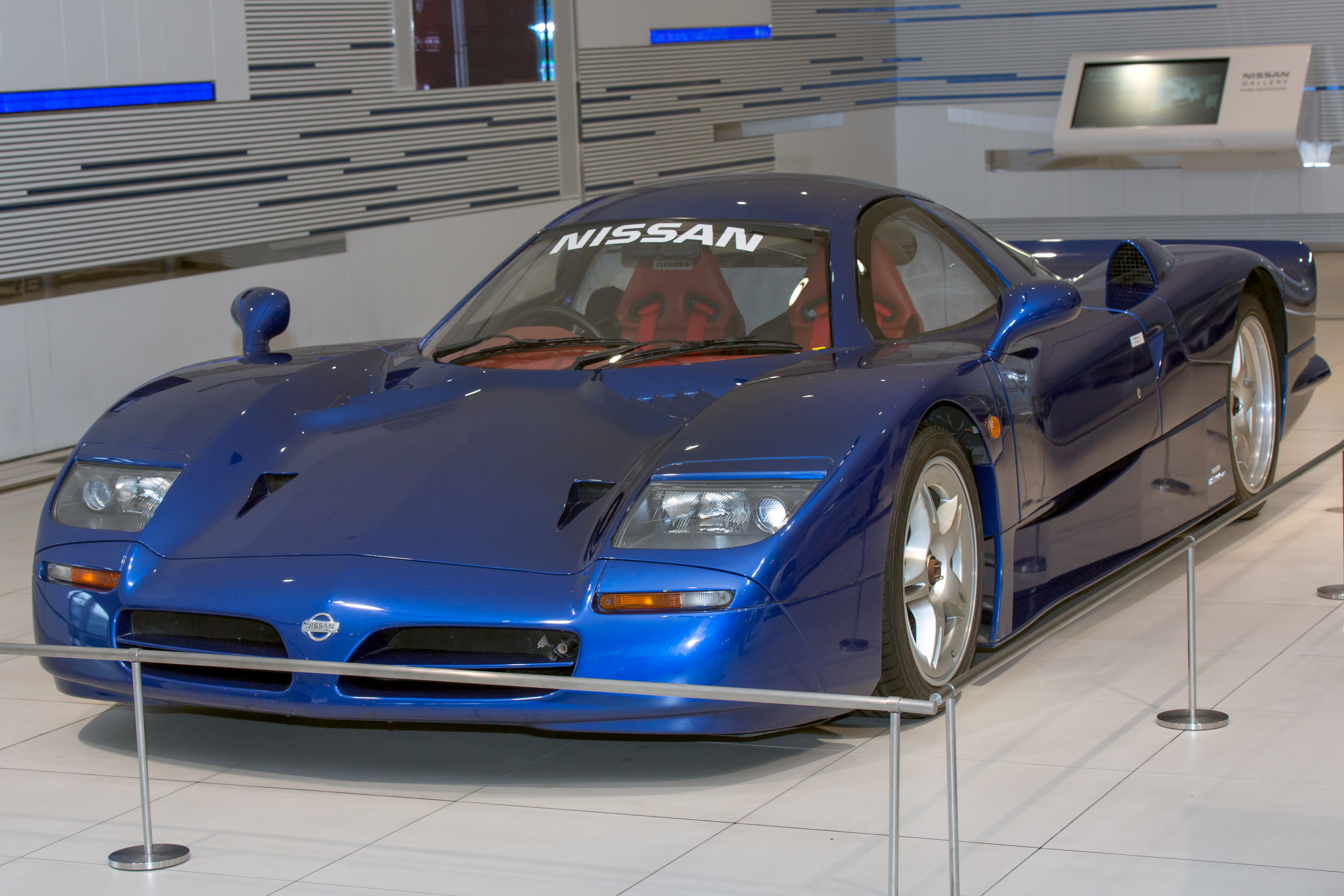
Nissan R390 (1997)

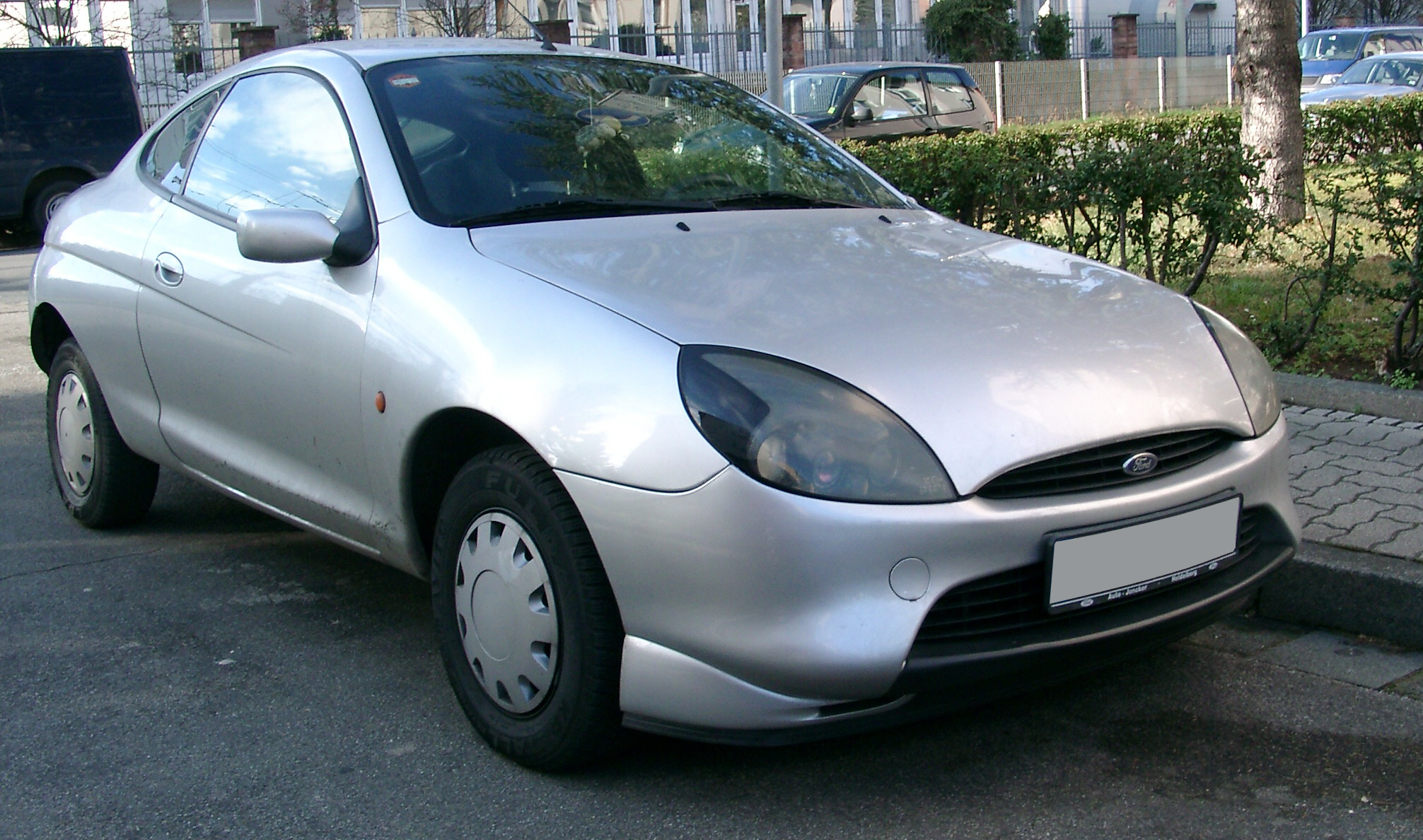
Ford Puma (1997)

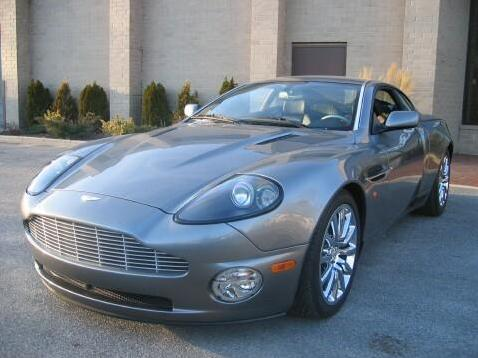
Aston Martin Vanquish (2001)

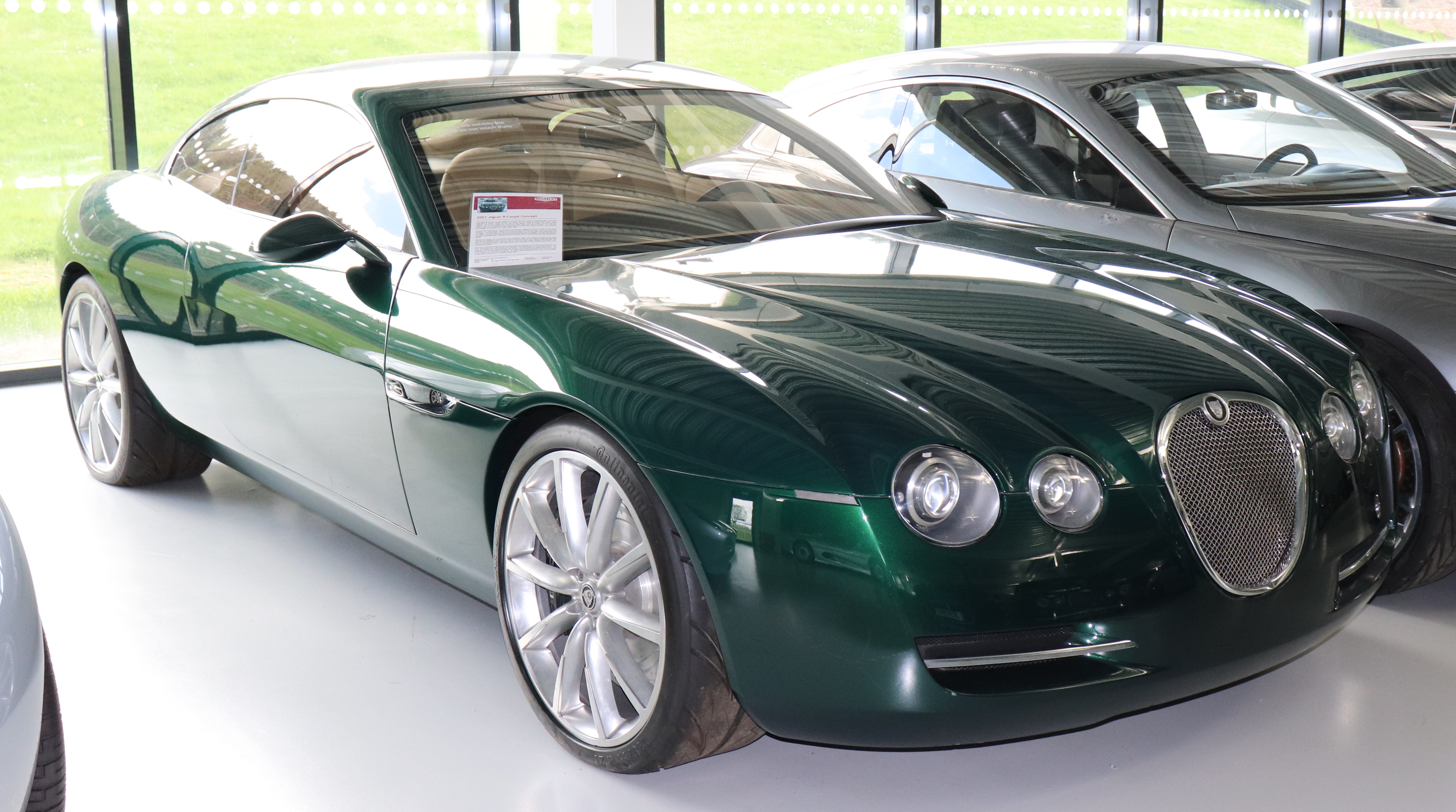
Jaguar R-Coupe (2001)

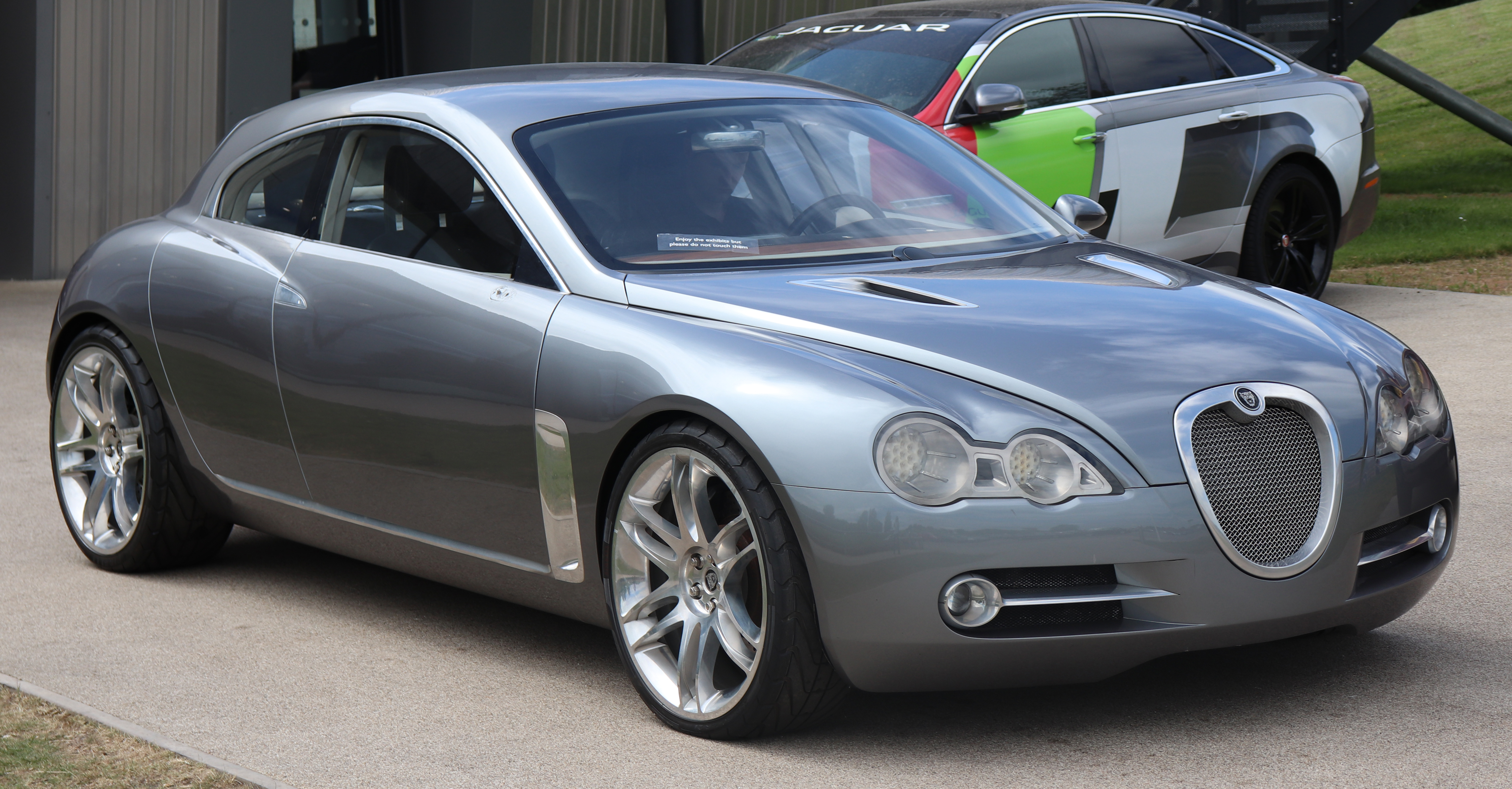
Jaguar R-D6 (2003)

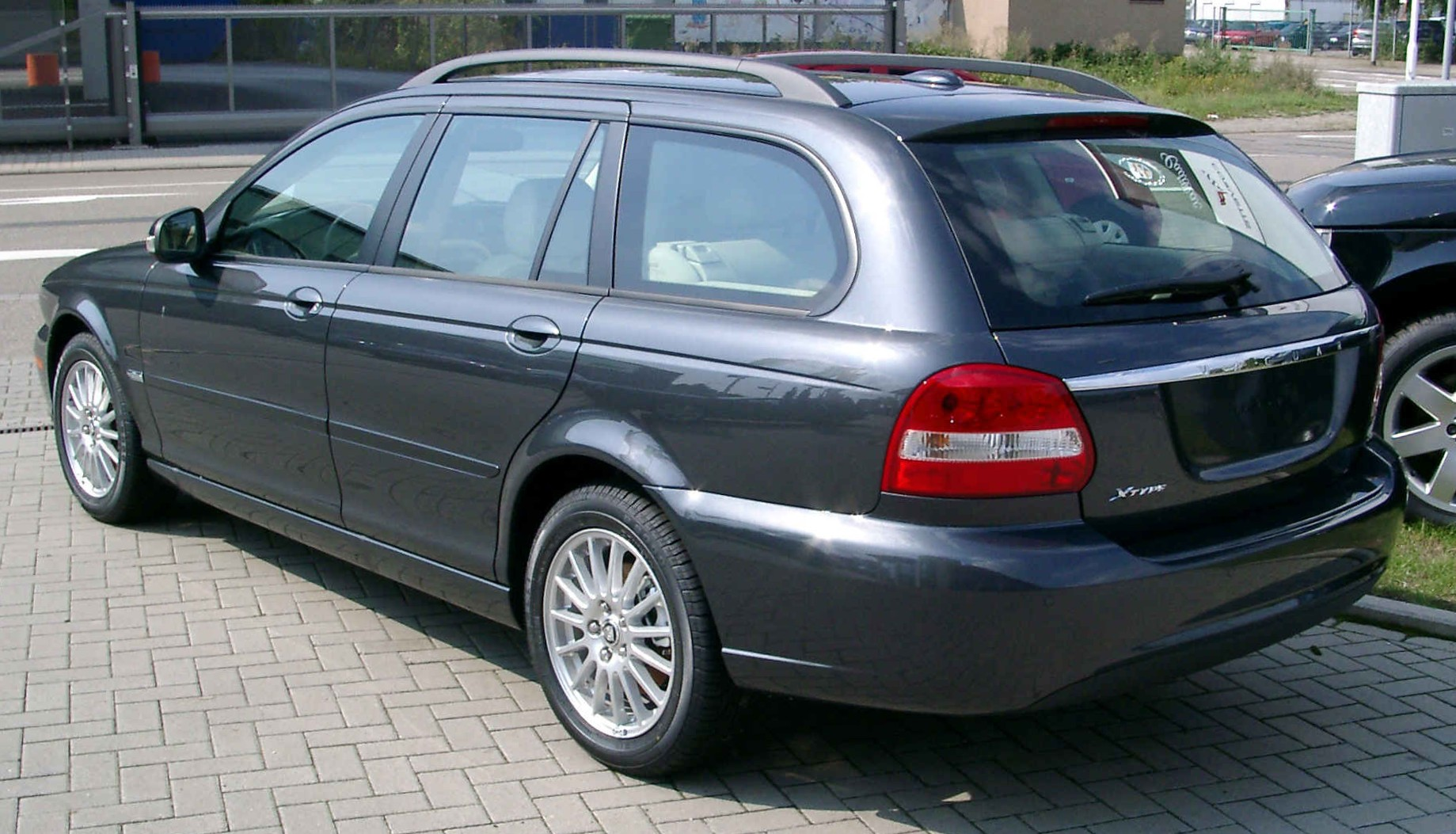
Jaguar X-Type Estate (2004)

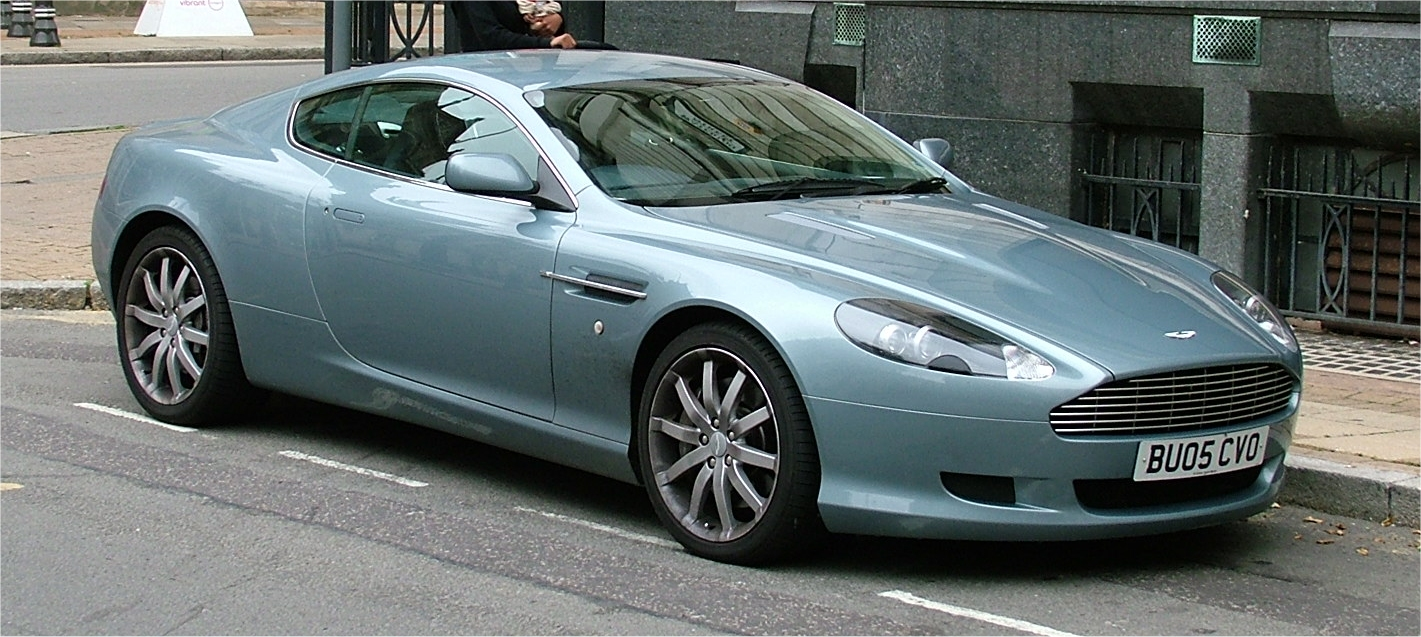
Aston Martin DB9 (2004)

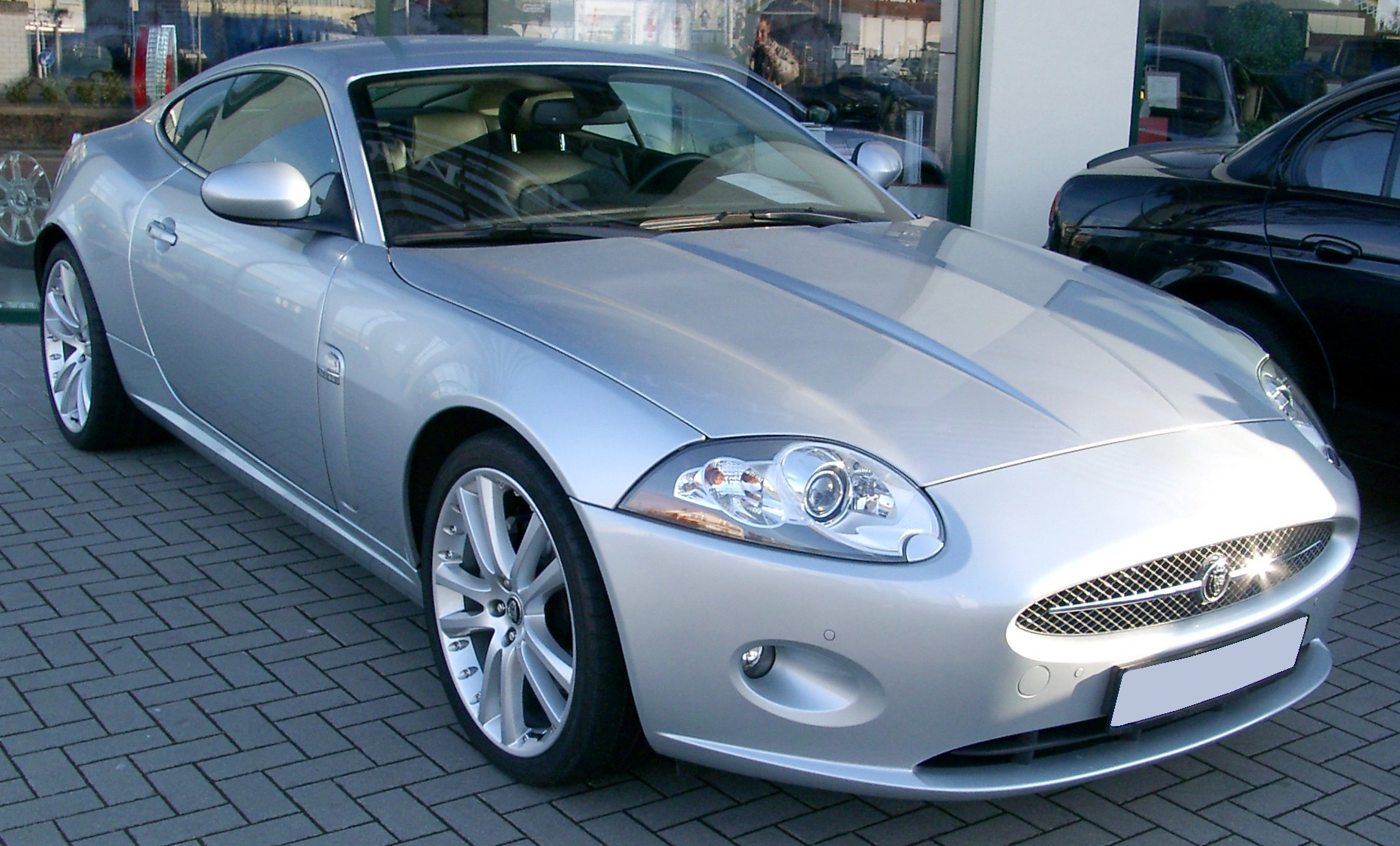
Jaguar XK (2005)

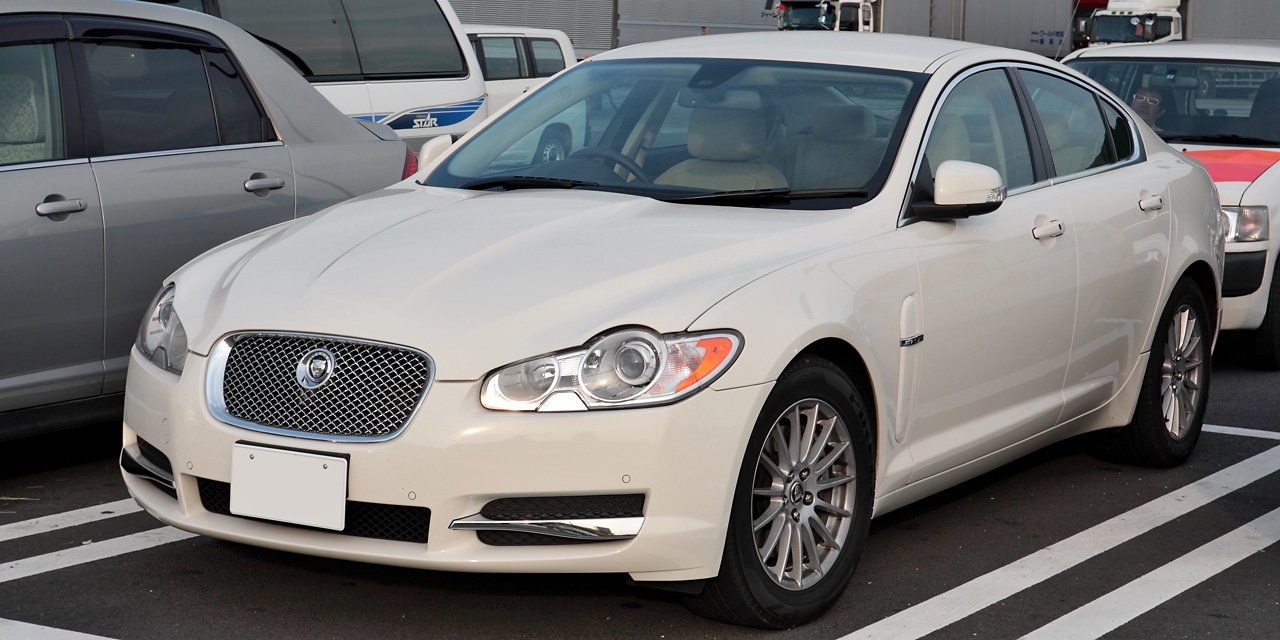
Jaguar XF (2008)

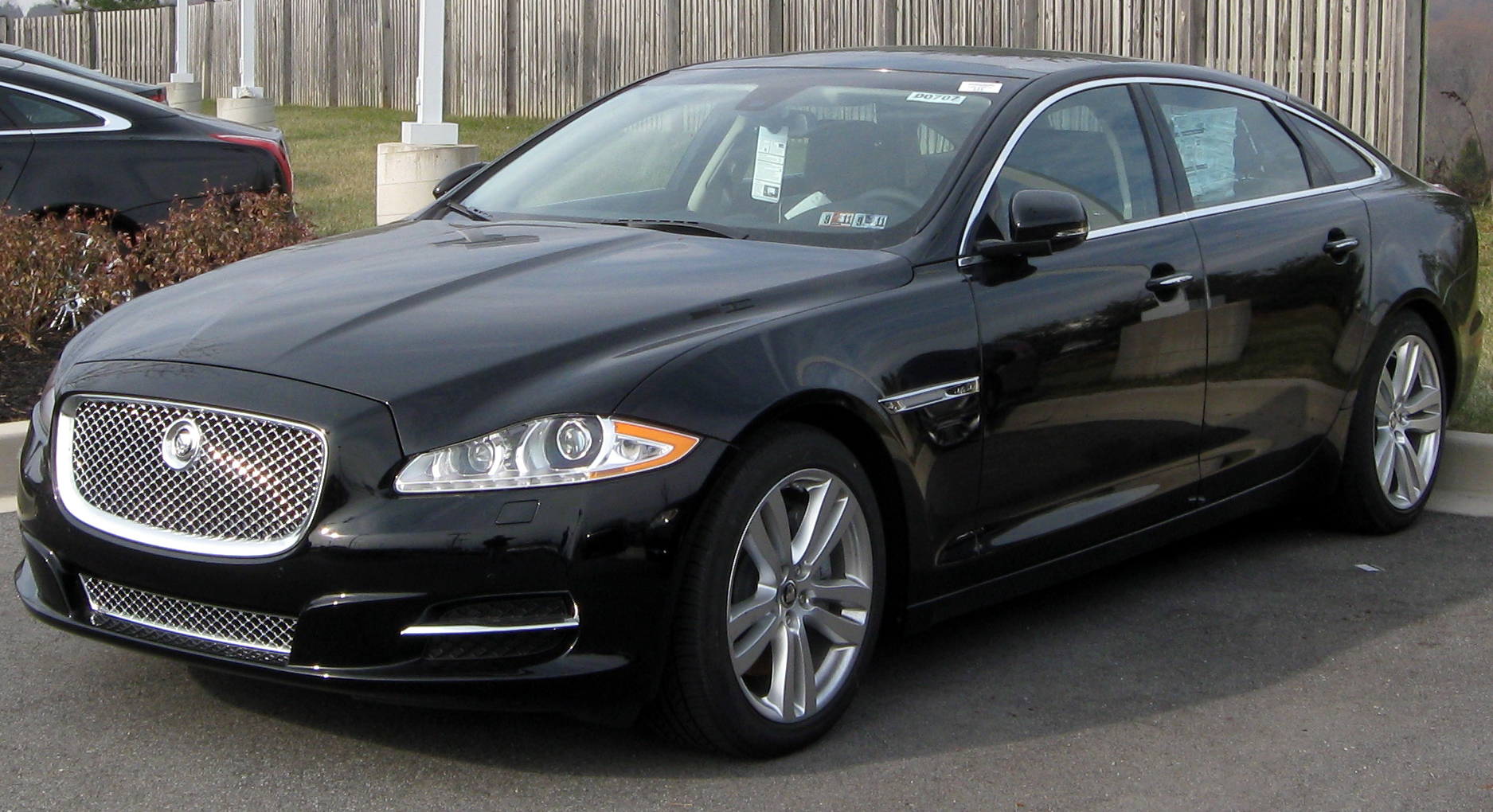
Jaguar XJ (2009)

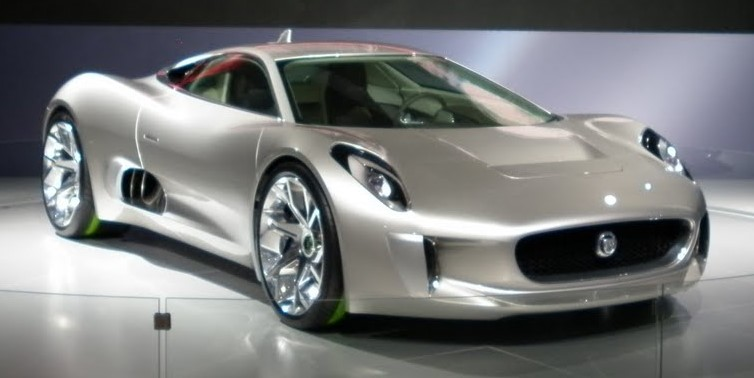
Jaguar C-X75 (2010)

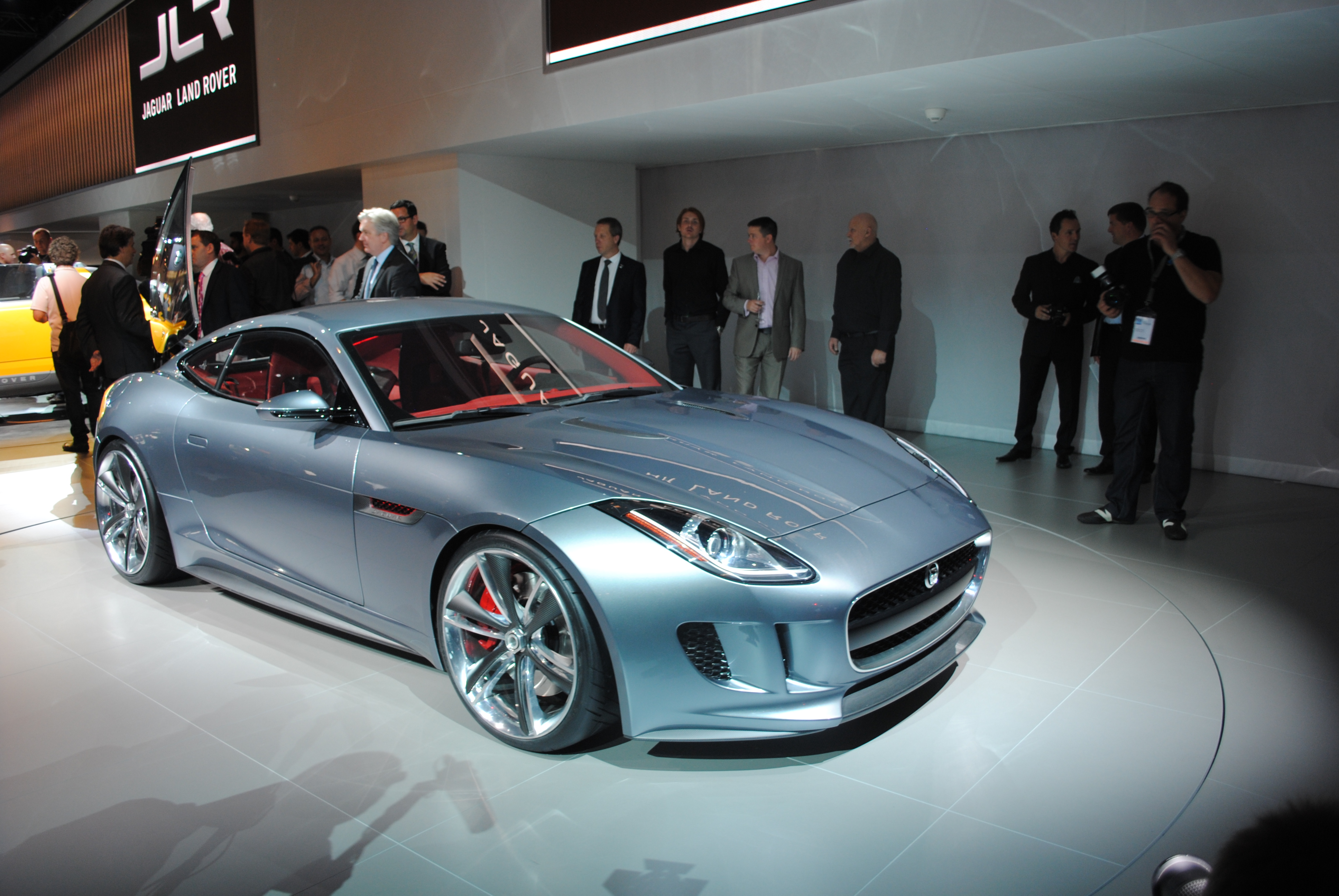
Jaguar C-X16 (2012)

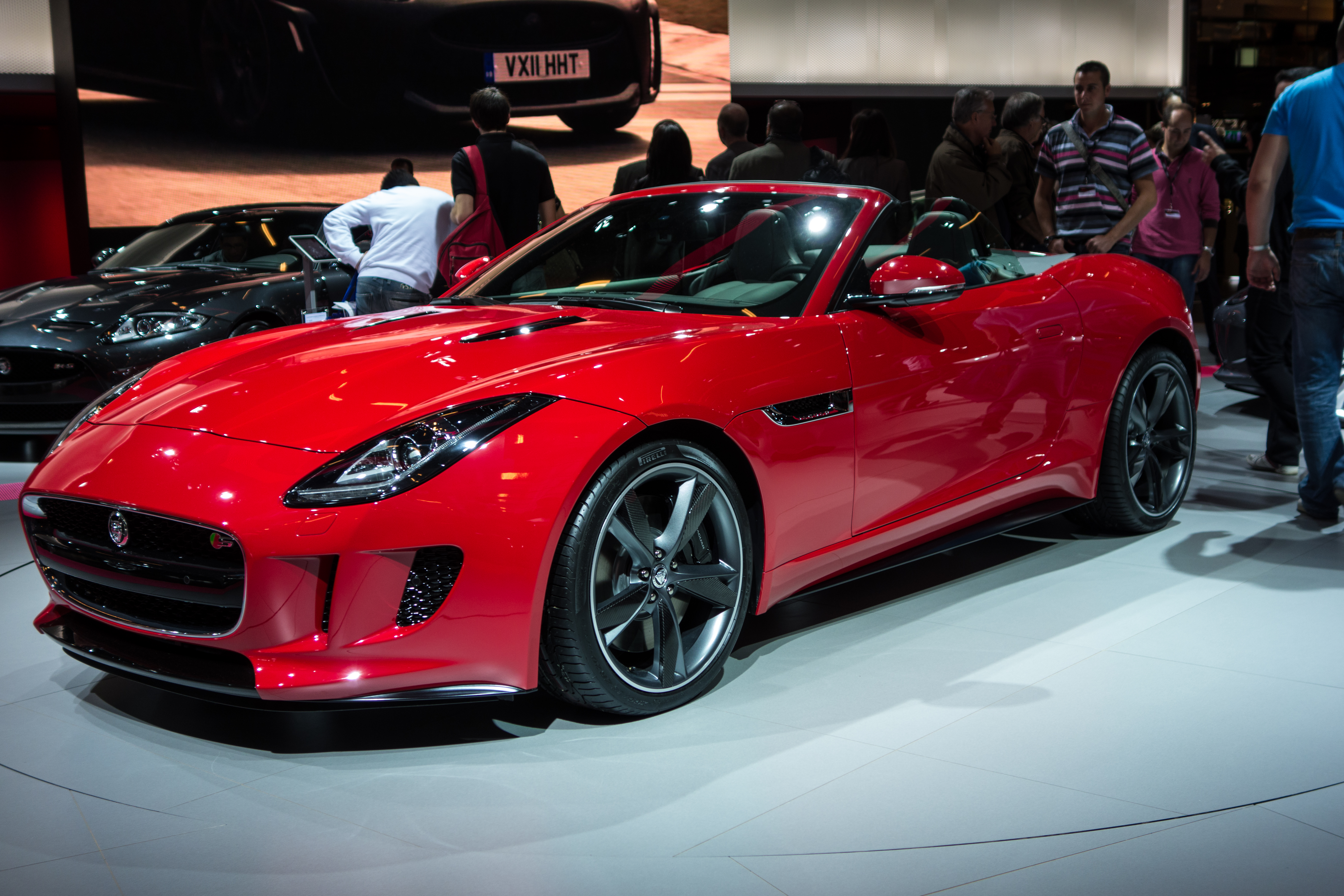
Jaguar F-Type (2013)

== Awards ==
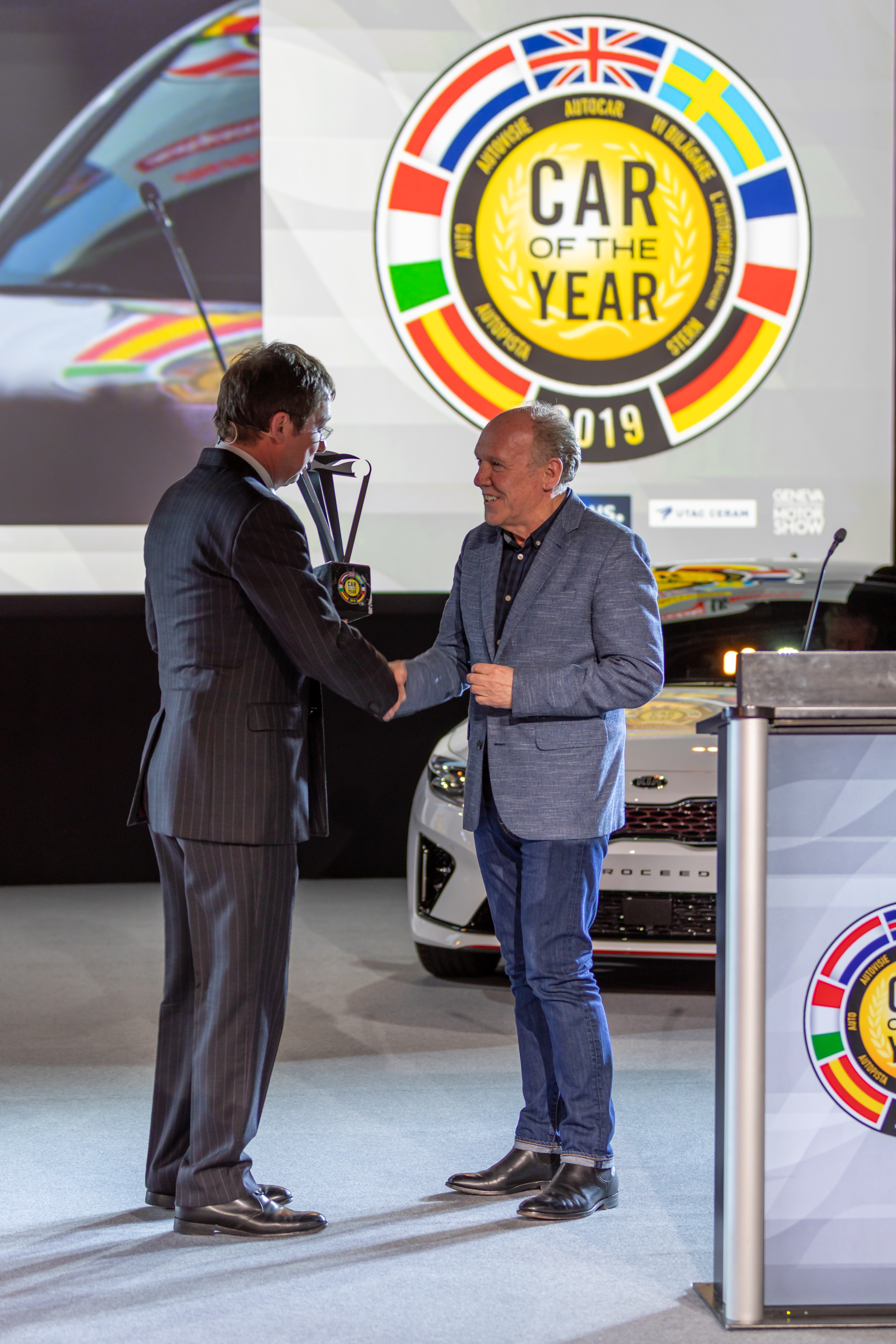
Callum receives the Car of the Year trophy for the Jaguar I-Pace

In 2006, he was honoured with a Royal Designer for Industry (RDI) award from the Royal Society of Arts and was joint recipient with his brother, Moray Callum, of the Jim Clark Memorial Trophy, awarded annually to Scots who have made a major contribution to the world of motoring.

In 2014 he received the Minerva Medal from the Chartered Society of Designers.

In 2016 he was invited to deliver the MacMillan Memorial Lecture to the Institution of Engineers and Shipbuilders in Scotland. He chose the subject "Car Design in the 21st Century".

In 2018, he was elected a Fellow of the Royal Society of Edinburgh.
