= Jaguar R-D6 =

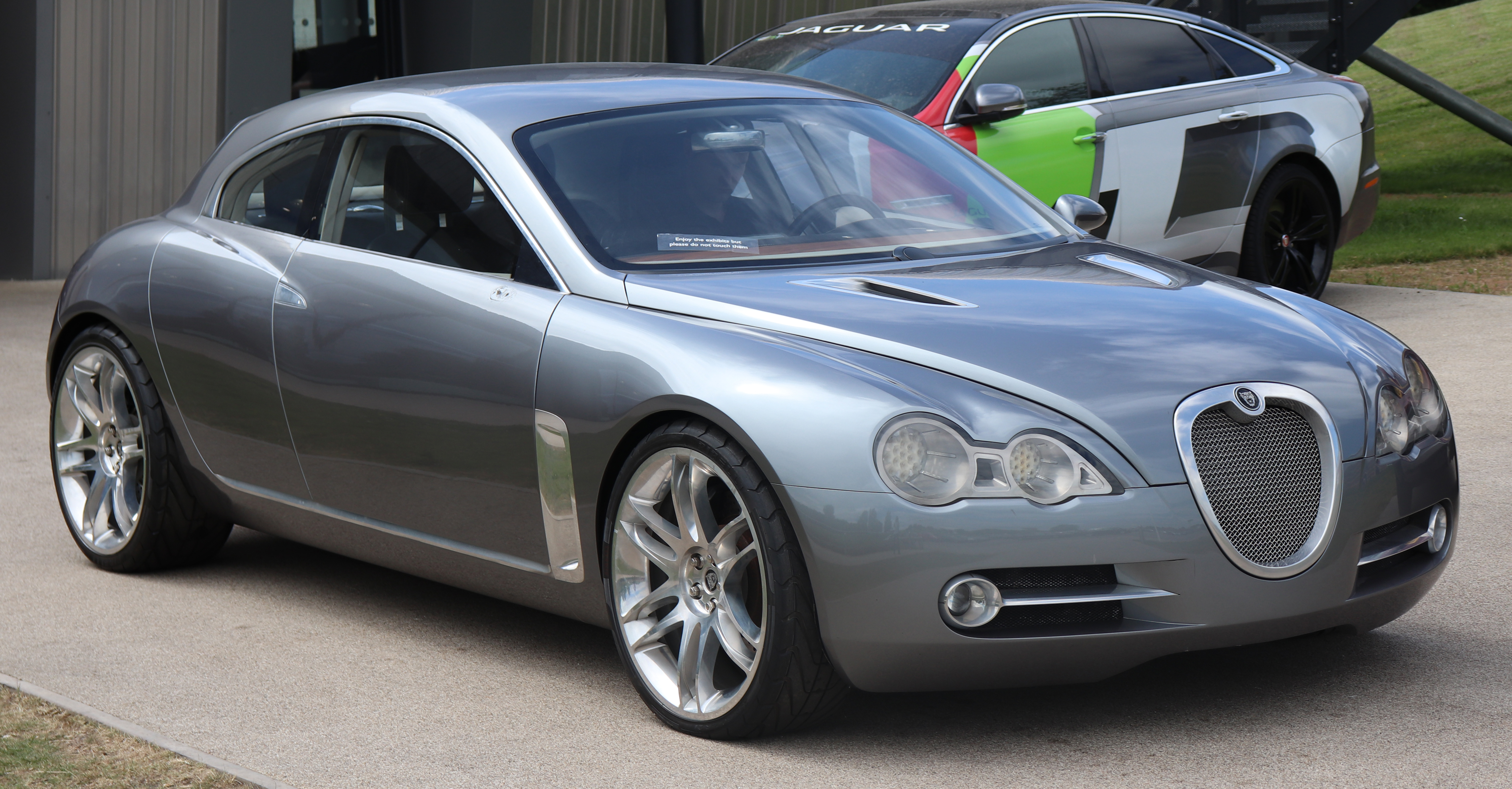

Overview
- Manufacturer: Jaguar Cars
- Production: 2003 (Concept car)
- Designer: Ian Callum

Body and chassis
- Class: Compact executive car (D)
- Body style: 5-door hatchback
- Layout: Front-engine, rear-wheel-drive
- Related: Jaguar X-Type

Powertrain
- Engine: 2.7 L V6 diesel

Dimensions
- Wheelbase: 2,840 mm (111.8 in)
- Length: 4,330 mm (170.5 in)
- Kerb weight: 1,500 kg (3,307 lb)

The Jaguar R-D6 is a concept car built by the British automaker Jaguar Cars, and unveiled to the public at the 2003 Frankfurt Motor Show.

It is powered by a 2.7-litre V6 bi-turbo diesel engine, producing 230 bhp (172 kW; 233 PS) and 500 N⋅m (369 lb⋅ft) of torque, it is rear wheel drive. The engine was developed with Peugeot and previewed the specification prior to the launch of the Jaguar S-Type diesel.

Designed by Ian Callum, the 5-door hatchback features rear-hinged doors based on technology from the Mazda RX-8, which was part of the Ford group at the time, and a side hinged rear door.

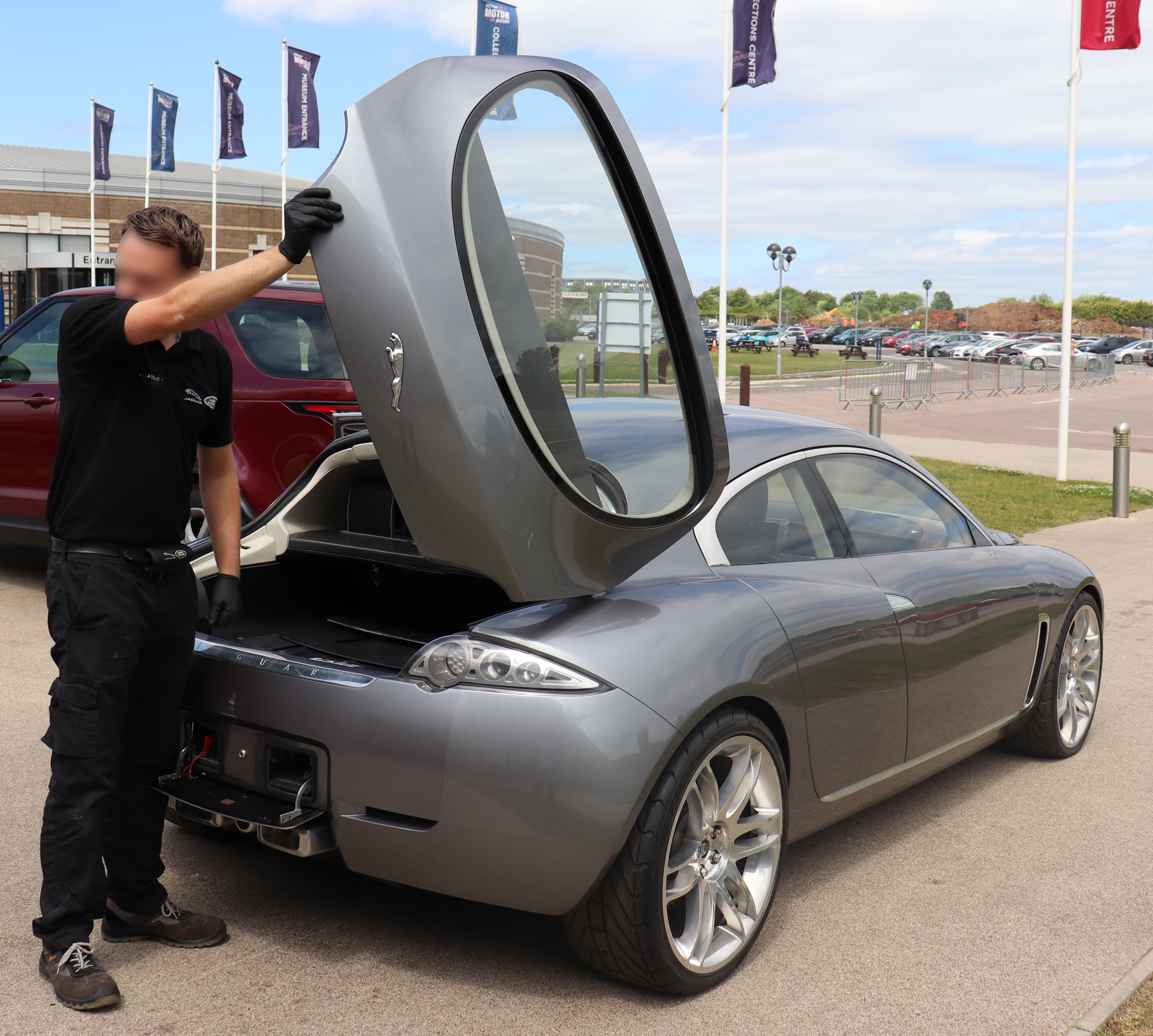
Rear view with the hatch open

The short 4,330 mm (170.5 in) long car sits on large 21" wheels and a 2,840 mm (111.8 in) wheelbase.
