= Jaguar R-Coupe =

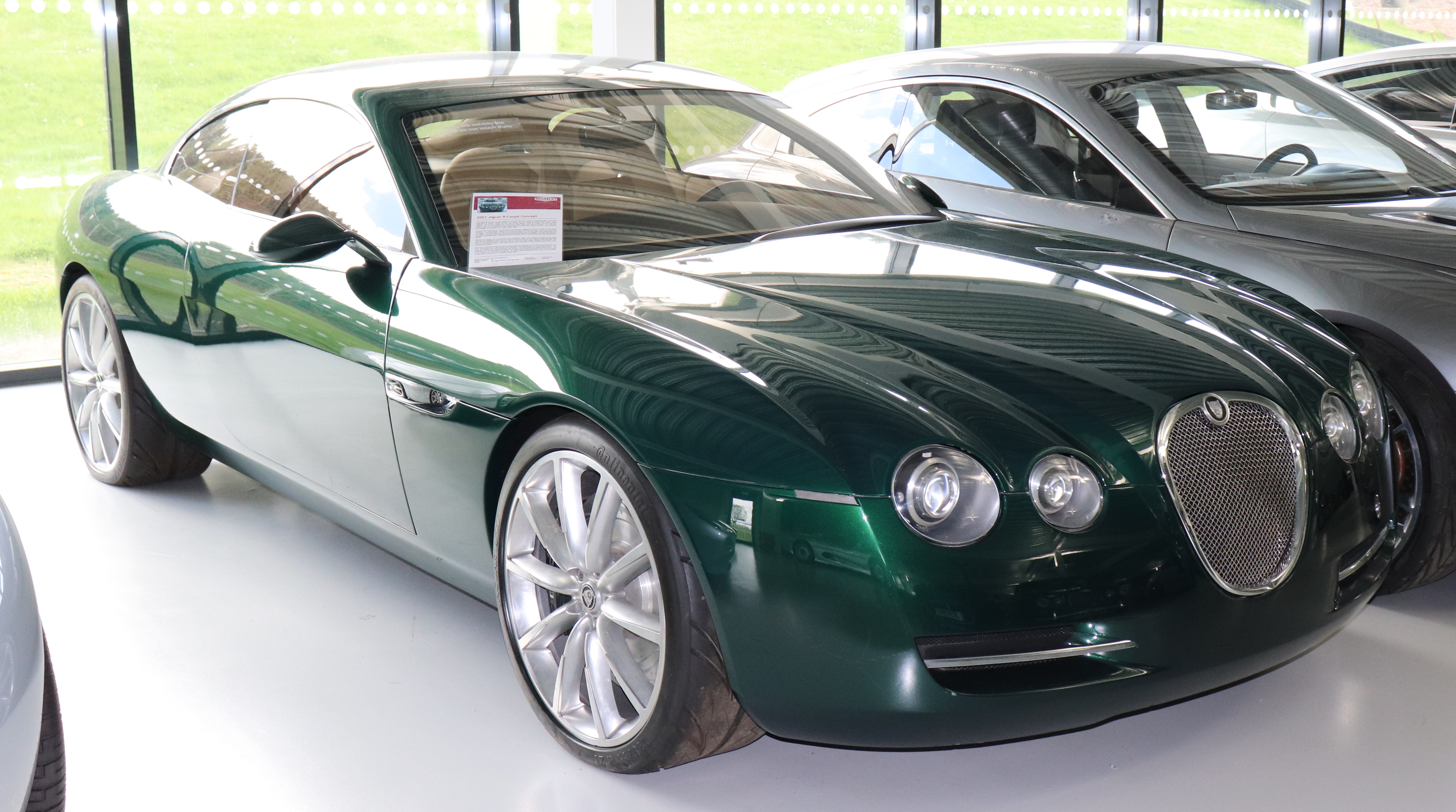

Overview
- Manufacturer: Jaguar
- Model years: 2001
- Designer: Ian Callum

Body and chassis
- Body style: 2-door coupé
- Layout: FR layout
- Related: Jaguar S-Type

Powertrain
- Engine: 4.0 L AJ26S SC V8
- Transmission: Automatic with F1 Style Gear Change

The Jaguar R-Coupe is a concept car developed by the British car company Jaguar. It was first shown to the public at the Frankfurt Motor Show in 2001.

Designed by Ian Callum, the four-seater, two-door coupe showed a new direction for Jaguars, which was developed from the style of the 1999 Jaguar S-Type. It is the first Jaguar design fully created under Callum's direction after his appointment to the company in 1999.

The R-Type is designed around the XKR's supercharged V8 engine and rear-drive drivetrain, but Jaguar emphasised that there were no plans for production.
