= X17 =

X17 may refer to:

- X17 (New York City bus)
- Agente X 1-7 operazione Oceano, a 1965 Italian-Spanish spy film
- Higashi-Onomichi Station, in Hiroshima Prefecture, Japan
- Jaguar C-X17, a concept SUV
- Lockheed X-17, an American research rocket
- X17 particle, a hypothetical sub-atomic particle
