= SVR =

SVR may refer to:

== Biology and medicine ==
- Systemic vascular resistance
- Sustained viral response in hepatitis C treatment

== Companies and organizations ==
- Foreign Intelligence Service (Russia) (Russian: Служба внешней разведки Российской Федерации, romanized: Sluzhba vneshney razvedki Rossiyskoy Federatsii, IPA: [ˈsluʐbə ˈvnʲɛʂnʲɪj rɐˈzvʲɛtkʲɪ])
- Second Vermont Republic, a US secessionist group
- Reykjavík bus company merged into Strætó bs
- SV Ried, an Austrian soccer club
- SVR Producciones, a Chilean record label
- Sons of Veterans Reserve, of the Sons of Union Veterans of the Civil War

== Finance ==
- Scottish variable rate of income tax
- Standard variable rate for mortgages

== Media ==
- WWE 2K, formerly WWE Smackdown VS. Raw.
- WWE Smackdown! VS. Raw (2004 video game)
- WWE SmackDown! vs. Raw 2006
- WWE SmackDown vs. Raw 2007
- WWE SmackDown vs. Raw 2008
- WWE SmackDown vs. Raw 2009
- WWE SmackDown vs. Raw 2010
- WWE SmackDown vs. Raw 2011

== Technology ==
- Super Video Recording in Video Cassette Recording
- UNIX System V Release
- Subvocal recognition
- Support vector regression

=== Transportation and vehicles ===
- Automotive
  - Jaguar R and SVR models of cars
  - Not to be confused with: SVO (Special Vehicle Operations)
- Railway
  - Severn Valley Railway, England
  - Spa Valley Railway, England
- Aerospace
  - Savissivik Heliport, Greenland

== Other uses ==
- SAME code for a severe thunderstorm warning
- Postal code for Santa Venera, Malta
- S. V. Ranga Rao, Indian cinema actor
