= Jaguar F-Pace =

Compact luxury crossover SUV by Jaguar

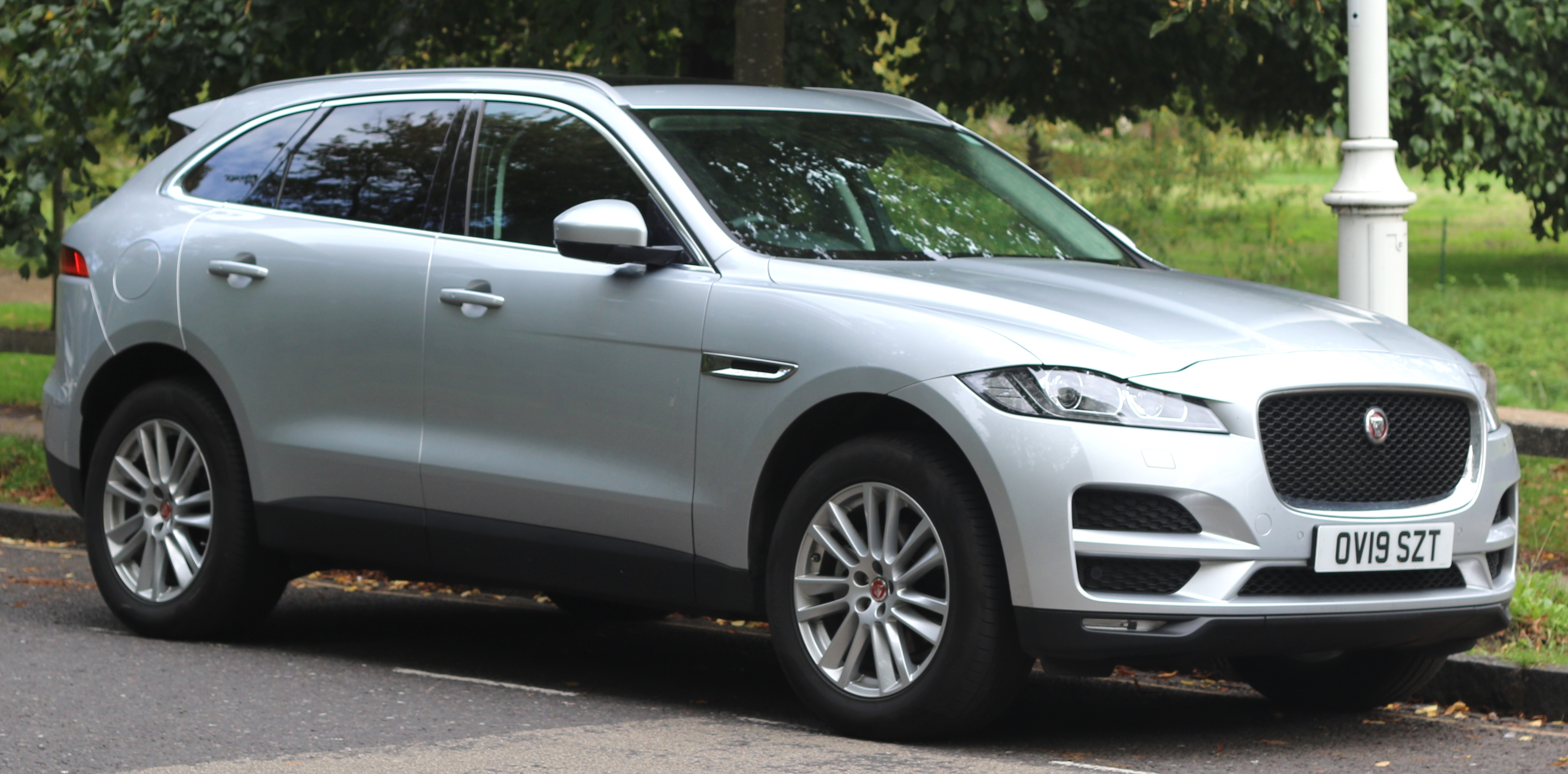

Overview
- Manufacturer: Jaguar Land Rover
- Model code: X761
- Production: February 2016 – December 2025
- Assembly: United Kingdom: Solihull (Solihull plant)
- Designer: Ian Callum

Body and chassis
- Class: Compact luxury crossover SUV
- Body style: 5-door SUV
- Layout: Front-engine, rear-wheel drive; Front-engine, four-wheel drive
- Platform: JLR D7a
- Related: Jaguar XE (X760); Jaguar XF (X260); Range Rover Velar

Powertrain
- Engine: Petrol: 2.0 L Ingenium I4; 3.0 L Ingenium I6 (Mild Hybrid); 3.0 L AJ126 V6; 5.0 L AJ133 V8; Petrol PHEV: 2.0 L Ingenium I4; Diesel: 2.0 L Ingenium I4; 2.0 L Ingenium I4 (Mild Hybrid); 3.0 L AJD-V6/PSA DT17 V6; 3.0 L Ingenium I6 (Mild Hybrid)
- Electric motor: 106 kW (144 PS; 142 hp) Permanent Magnet Synchronous Motor (PHEV)
- Transmission: 6-speed manual; 8-speed ZF 8HP automatic
- Hybrid drivetrain: Mild Hybrid (D200, D300, and P400); Plug-in Hybrid (P400e PHEV)
- Battery: 17.1 kWh Lithium ion (PHEV)

Dimensions
- Wheelbase: 2,874 mm (113.1 in)
- Length: 4,747 mm (186.9 in)
- Width: 2,071 mm (81.5 in)
- Height: 1,664 mm (65.5 in)
- Kerb weight: 1,690–2,230 kg (3,730–4,920 lb)

The Jaguar F-Pace (X761) is a compact luxury crossover SUV that was manufactured by Jaguar Land Rover, a British car manufacturer, under their Jaguar marque. It was the first Jaguar SUV. It was formally announced at the 2015 North American International Auto Show in Detroit, with sales commencing in 2016 following an unveiling at the 2015 International Motor Show Germany in Frankfurt.

The design of the F-Pace was based on the Jaguar C-X17 concept car, which was unveiled on September 9, 2013, at the Frankfurt Motor Show. The 2017 Jaguar F-Pace has been named the honorary winner of the 2017 World Car of the Year and World Car Design of the Year Awards at the New York International Auto Show. The F-Pace was built at Jaguar Land Rover's Solihull plant along with the Range Rover Velar.

== Launch ==
An F-Pace production prototype made its public debut on 4 July 2015 by leading out the Team Sky professional cycle racing team during Le Grand Départ in Utrecht, Netherlands, at the start of the 2015 Tour de France. Customer deliveries started in April 2016 in Europe, and in May 2016 in the United States. The car made its official public début at the September 2015 Frankfurt Motor Show. Ahead of the Frankfurt Motor Show, an F-Pace, driven by professional stunt driver Terry Grant, performed a world-record-breaking 360 degree loop-the-loop.

== Engines ==
The F-Pace was offered with the Jaguar Land Rover's Ingenium 2.0L turbocharged diesel and 2.0L petrol turbocharged engines, available in the Prestige, Portfolio and R-Sport specifications, while the 3.0L turbocharged diesel (except in the United States) and supercharged petrol are available in the S and First Edition specifications. The F-Pace was offered in both RWD and AWD variants. The F-Pace SVR was powered by Jaguar's 5.0L AJ133 supercharged V8 producing 550 PS (405 kW; 542 hp) and 680 N⋅m (502 lb⋅ft)

In late 2020, a facelift on the vehicle occurred and it was given a new 2.0L inline-4 PHEV engine combination, as well as a 3.0L inline-6 mild hybrid engine, utilizing a 48 Volt belt alternator starter system and an electric supercharger. The mild hybrid technology was available on both petrol and diesel versions of the 3.0L Ingenium inline-6, known as P400 and D300 respectively, as well as the 2.0L D200 inline-4.

Diesel engines
Engine type	Engine displacement	Badging	Power @ RPM	Torque @ RPM	0–100 km/h (0–62 mph) acceleration	Top speed	Transmission	Production
2.0 Turbocharged Ingenium I4	1,999 cc (122 cu in)	E-Performance	120 kW; 161 hp (163 PS) @ 4,000	380 N⋅m (280 lb⋅ft) @ 1,750 – 2,500	10.2 s	195 km/h (121 mph)	6 speed manual	05/2017 – 09/2020
2.0 Turbocharged Ingenium I4	1,999 cc (122 cu in)	D165 AWD	120 kW; 161 hp (163 PS) @ 4,250	380 N⋅m (280 lb⋅ft) @ 1,500 – 2,500	9.9s	195 km/h (121 mph)	8 speed automatic	09/2020 – 04/2022
2.0 Turbocharged Ingenium I4	1,999 cc (122 cu in)	D165 AWD	120 kW; 161 hp (163 PS) @ 3,750 – 4,000	380 N⋅m (280 lb⋅ft) @ 1,500 – 2,500	10.1s	195 km/h (121 mph)	8 speed automatic	04/2022 – 12/2022
2.0 Turbocharged Ingenium I4	1,999 cc (122 cu in)	D165 AWD	120 kW; 161 hp (163 PS) @ 3,500 – 4,250	380 N⋅m (280 lb⋅ft) @ 1,500 – 2,500	10.1s	195 km/h (121 mph)	8 speed automatic	09/2020 – 04/2022
2.0 Turbocharged Ingenium I4	1,999 cc (122 cu in)	20d	132 kW; 178 hp (180 PS) @ 4,000	430 N⋅m (317 lb⋅ft) @ 1,750 – 2,500	8.9 s (manual) 8.5s (automatic)	209 km/h (130 mph)(manual) 208 km/h (129 mph)(automatic)	6 speed manual (until 05/2017) 8 speed automatic	04/2016 – 09/2020
2.0 Turbocharged Ingenium I4	1,999 cc (122 cu in)	20d AWD	132 kW; 178 hp (180 PS) @ 4,250	430 N⋅m (317 lb⋅ft) @ 1,750 – 2,500	8.7 s	208 km/h (129 mph)	6 speed manual 8 speed automatic	04/2016 – 09/2020
2.0 Twin-turbocharged Ingenium I4	1,999 cc (122 cu in)	25d	177 kW; 237 hp (240 PS) @ 4,000	500 N⋅m (369 lb⋅ft) @ 1,500	7.2 s	217 km/h (135 mph)	8 speed automatic	05/2017–09/2020
3.0 Twin-turbocharged AJD V6	2,993 cc (183 cu in)	30d AWD	221 kW; 296 hp (300 PS) @ 4,000	700 N⋅m (516 lb⋅ft) @ 2,000	6.2 s	241 km/h (150 mph)	8 speed automatic	05/2017–09/2020
Petrol engines
2.0 Turbocharged Ingenium I4	1,997 cc (122 cu in)	25t/P250 AWD	184 kW; 247 hp (250 PS) @ 5,500	365 N⋅m (269 lb⋅ft) @ 1,200 – 4,500	6.8 s	217 km/h (135 mph)	8 speed automatic	05/2017–04/2024
2.0 Turbocharged Ingenium I4	1,997 cc (122 cu in)	30t AWD	221 kW; 296 hp (300 PS) @ 5,500	400 N⋅m (295 lb⋅ft) @ 1,200 – 4,500	6.0 s	233 km/h (145 mph)	8 speed automatic	06/2017–09/2020
3.0 Supercharged AJ126 V6	2,995 cc (183 cu in)	S AWD (35t AWD for NA market)	250 kW; 335 hp (340 PS) @ 6,500	450 N⋅m (332 lb⋅ft) @ 4,500	5.8 s	250 km/h (155 mph)	8 speed automatic	04/2016–06/2017
3.0 Supercharged AJ126 V6	2,995 cc (183 cu in)	S AWD	279 kW; 375 hp (380 PS) @ 6,500	450 N⋅m (332 lb⋅ft) @ 4,500	5.5 s	250 km/h (155 mph)	8 speed automatic	04/2016–09/2020
5.0 Supercharged AJ133 V8	5,000 cc (305 cu in)	SVR	405 kW; 542 hp (550 PS) @ 6,000 – 6,500	680 N⋅m (502 lb⋅ft) @ 2,500 – 5,500	4.3 s	283 km/h (176 mph)	8 speed automatic	05/2018–09/2020
5.0 Supercharged AJ133 V8	5,000 cc (305 cu in)	P550	405 kW; 542 hp (550 PS) @ 6,250 – 6,500	700 N⋅m (516 lb⋅ft) @ 3,500 – 5,500	4.0 s	286 km/h (178 mph)	8 speed automatic	09/2020–11/2023
5.0 Supercharged AJ133 V8	5,000 cc (305 cu in)	SVR P575 AWD	423 kW; 567 hp (575 PS) @ 6,000 – 6,500	700 N⋅m (516 lb⋅ft) @ 3,500 – 5,000	4.0 s	286 km/h (178 mph)	8 speed automatic	11/2023–12/2025
Plug-In Hybrid
2.0 Turbocharged Ingenium I4 petrol engine + 105 kW electric motor	1,997 cc (122 cu in)	P400e PHEV AWD	297 kW; 398 hp (404 PS) @ 5,500	640 N⋅m (472 lb⋅ft) @ 1,500 – 4,400	5.3 s	240 km/h (149 mph)	8 speed automatic	09/2020–12/2025
48-Volt Diesel Mild Hybrid
2.0 Turbocharged Ingenium I4	1,999 cc (122 cu in)	D200 MHEV AWD	150 kW; 201 hp (204 PS) @ 4,250	430 N⋅m (317 lb⋅ft) @ 1,500 – 2,500	8.0 s	210 km/h (130 mph)	8 speed automatic	09/2020–12/2022
2.0 Turbocharged Ingenium I4	1,999 cc (122 cu in)	D200 MHEV AWD	150 kW; 201 hp (204 PS) @ 3,750 – 4,000	430 N⋅m (317 lb⋅ft) @ 1,750 – 2,500	8.2 s	210 km/h (130 mph)	8 speed automatic	12/2022–04/2025
3.0 Twin-turbocharged Ingenium I6	2,997 cc (183 cu in)	D300 MHEV AWD	221 kW; 296 hp (300 PS) @ 4,000	650 N⋅m (479 lb⋅ft) @ 1,500 – 2,500	6.4 s	230 km/h (143 mph)	8 speed automatic	09/2020-12/2025
48-Volt Petrol Mild Hybrid
3.0 Turbocharged Ingenium I6	2,996 cc (183 cu in)	P400 AWD	294 kW; 395 hp (400 PS) @ 5,500 – 6,500	550 N⋅m (406 lb⋅ft) @ 2,000 – 5,000	5.4 s	250 km/h (155 mph)	8 speed automatic	09/2020-12/2025

== Transmission ==
F-Pace models were equipped with the same ZF 8HP eight-speed automatic transmission as other D7a platform vehicles, a lighter variant of the gearbox currently fitted to other Jaguar models. A six-speed ZF manual gearbox was available on the lower-powered diesel models.

== Exterior ==
Ian Callum was the exterior designer for the F-Pace. The body structure comprises 80 per cent aluminium, and additional weight savings come from the composite tailgate and magnesium for parts such as the cross-car beam. The body's high torsional stiffness enables the F-Type-derived double-wishbone front suspension and sophisticated Integral Link rear suspension to perform even better. Together with Torque Vectoring as standard and an Electric Power Assisted Steering system tuned to give the best possible feel and response.

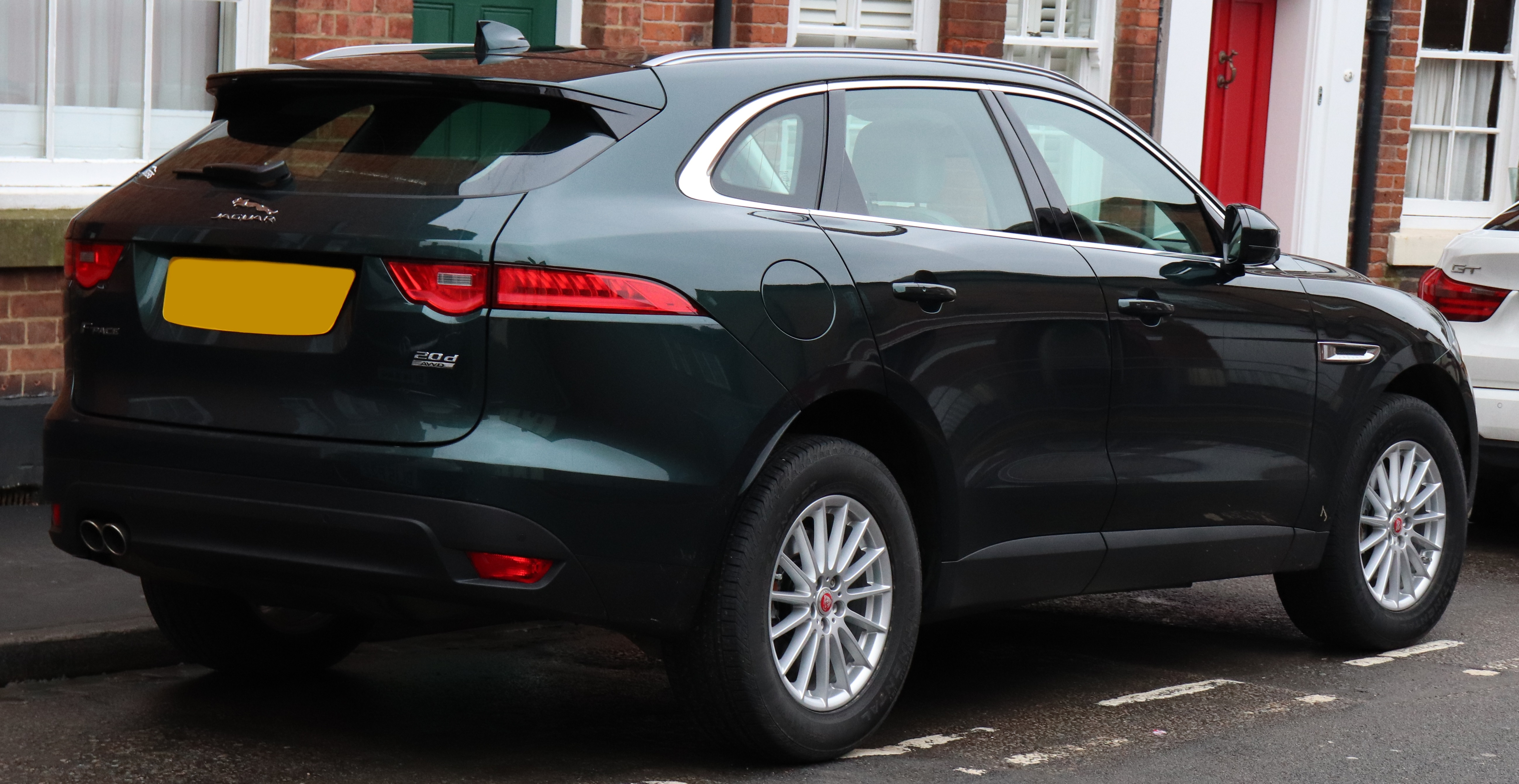
Rear view (Portfolio)

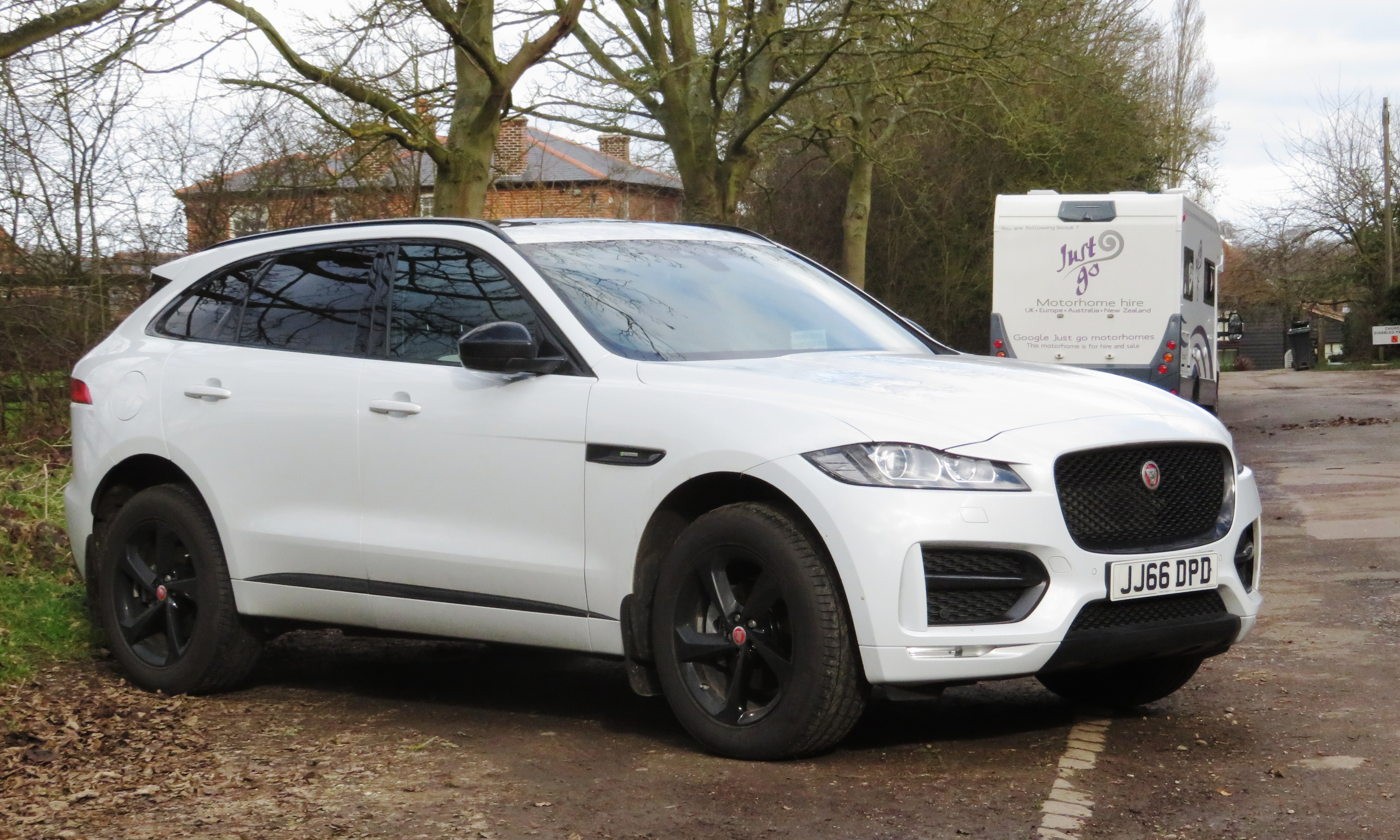
Jaguar F-Pace R-Sport

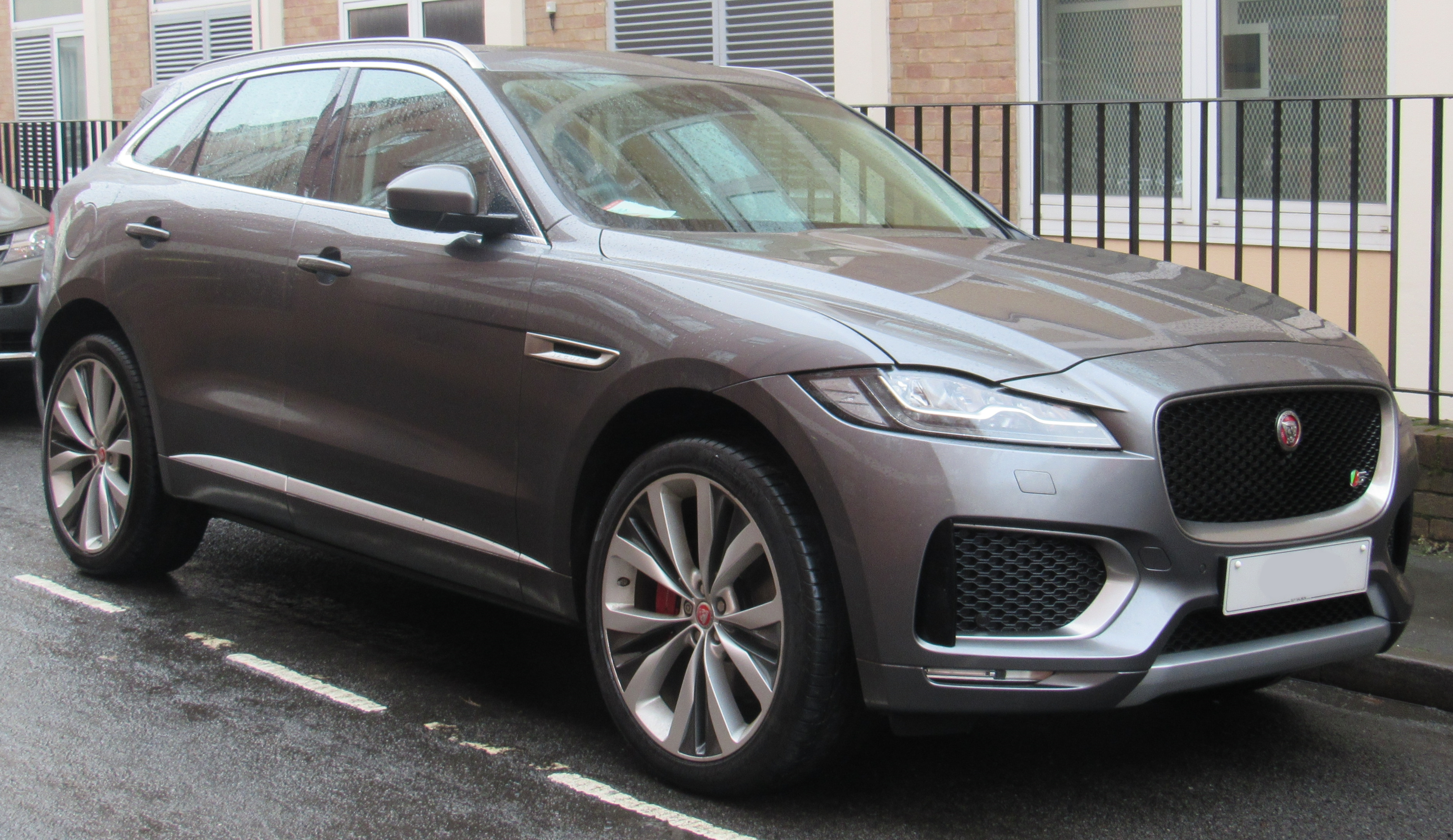
Jaguar F-Pace S

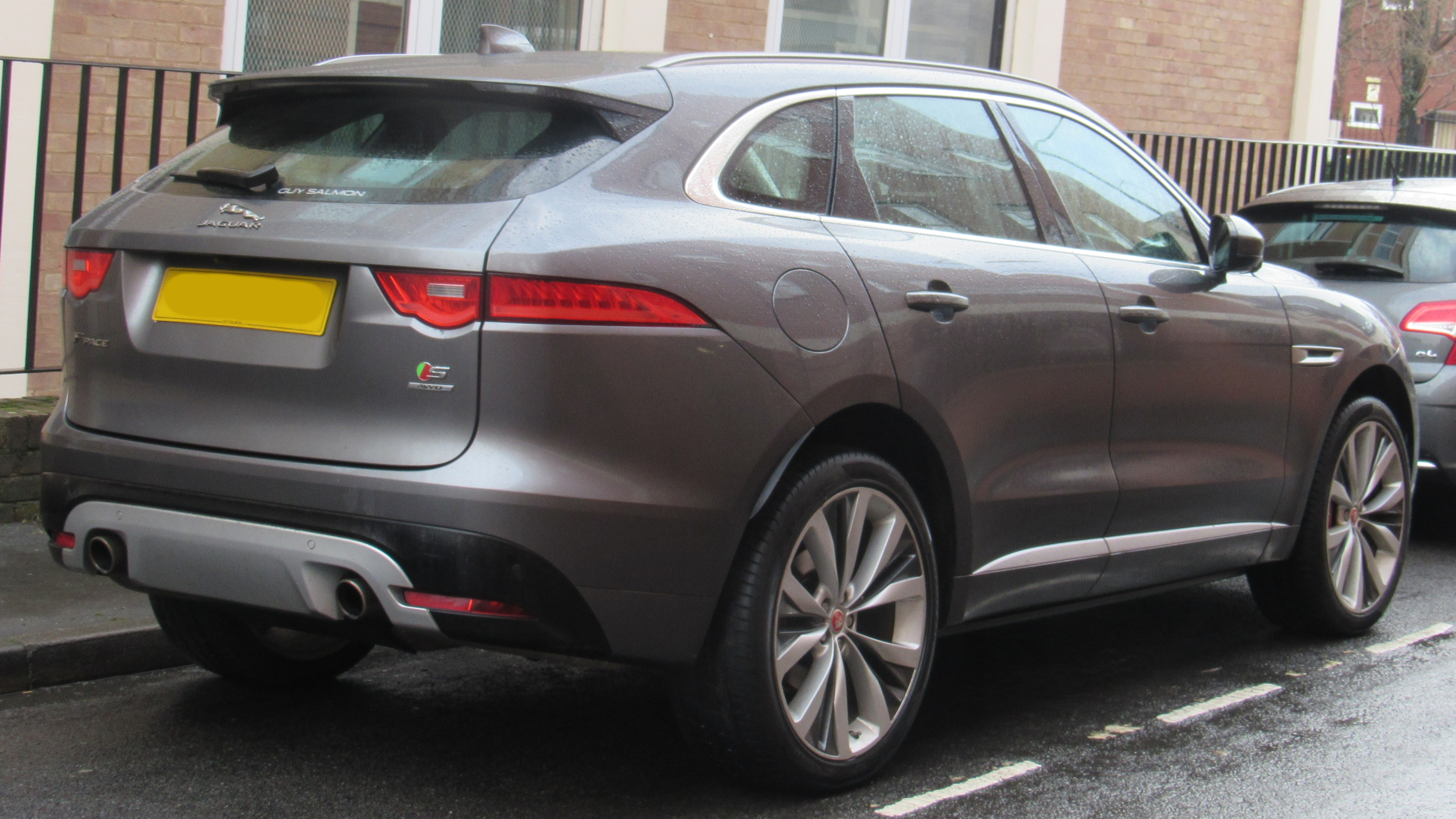
Jaguar F-Pace S

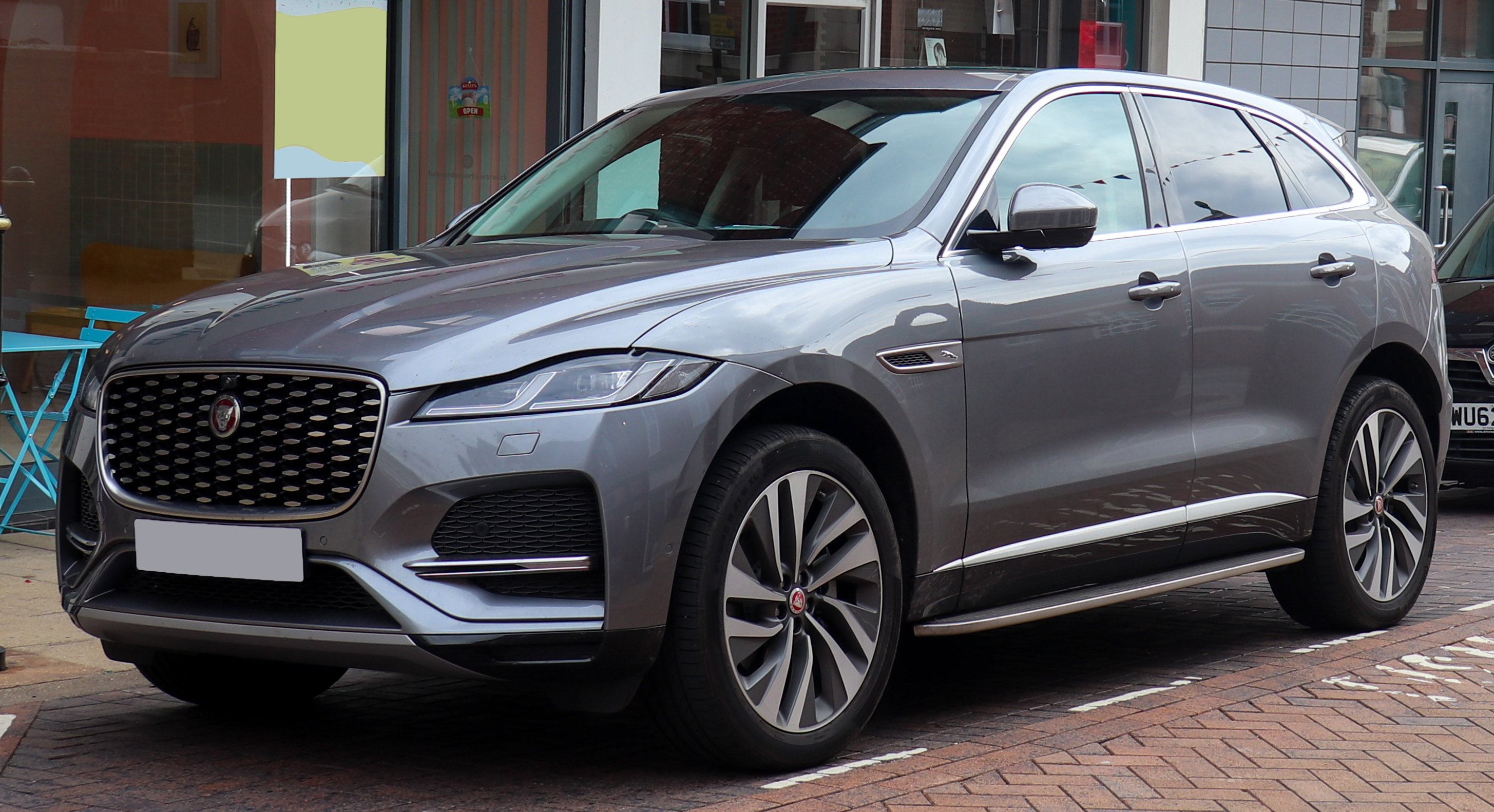
2020 facelift

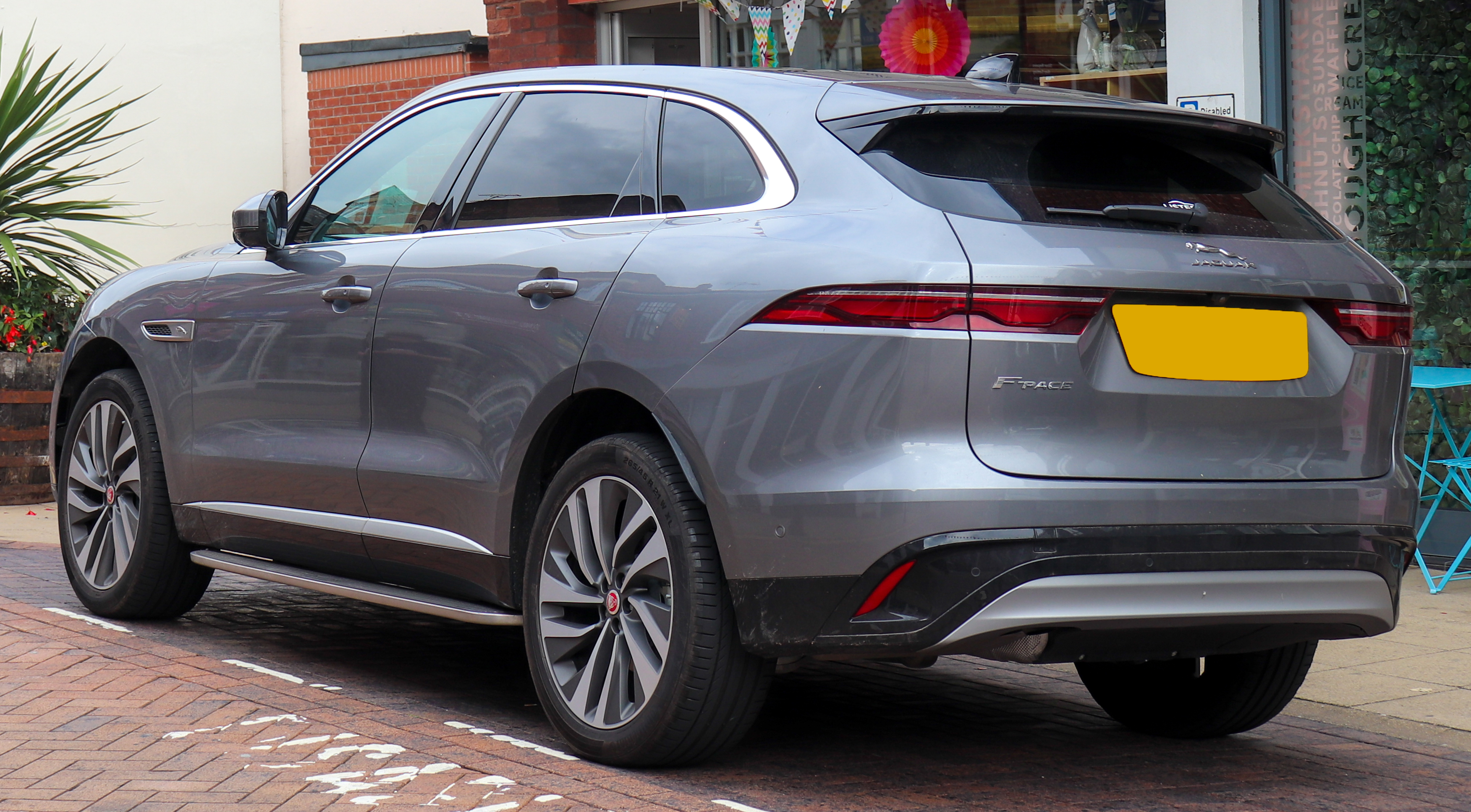
2020 facelift

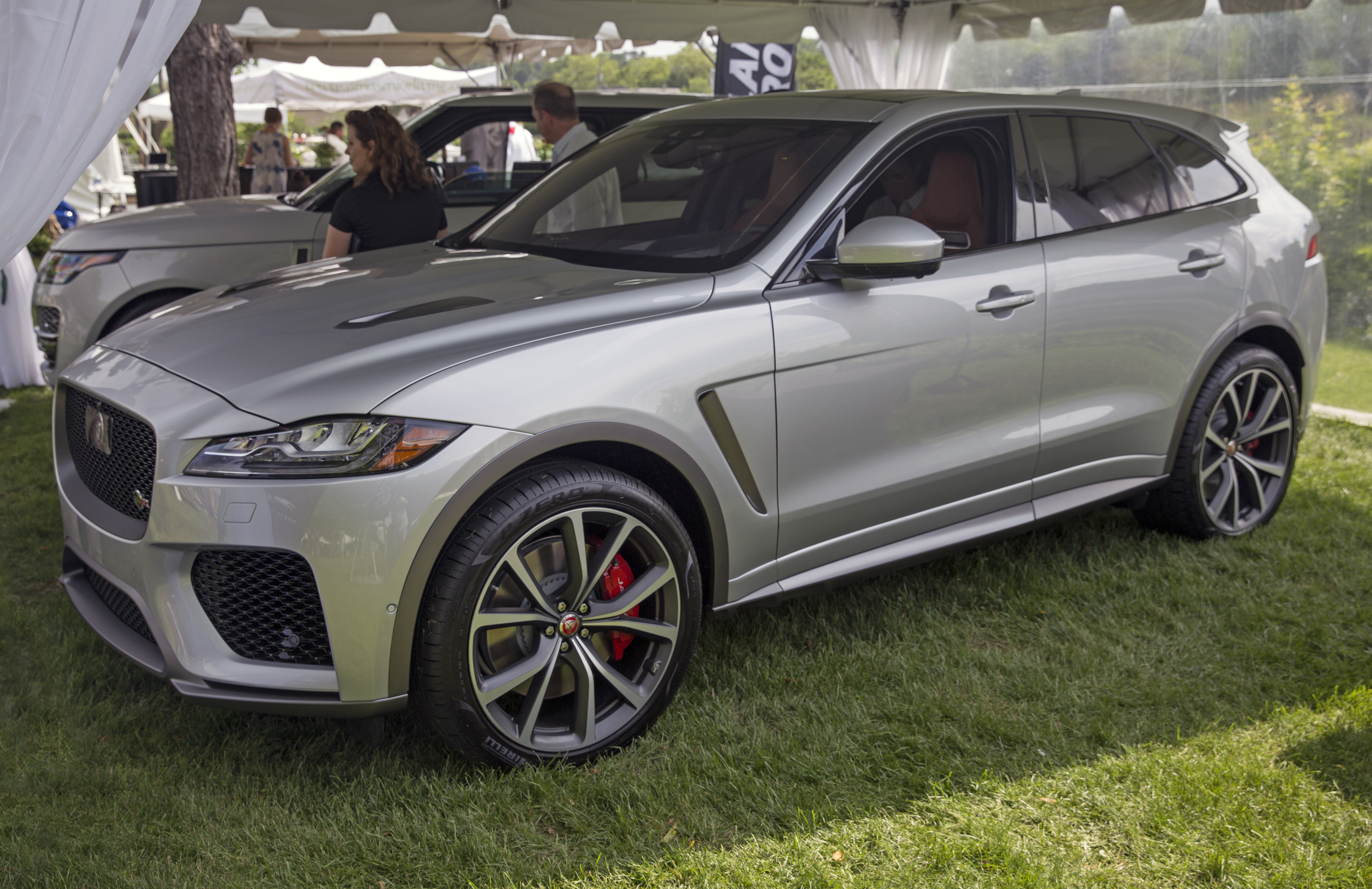
Jaguar F-Pace SVR

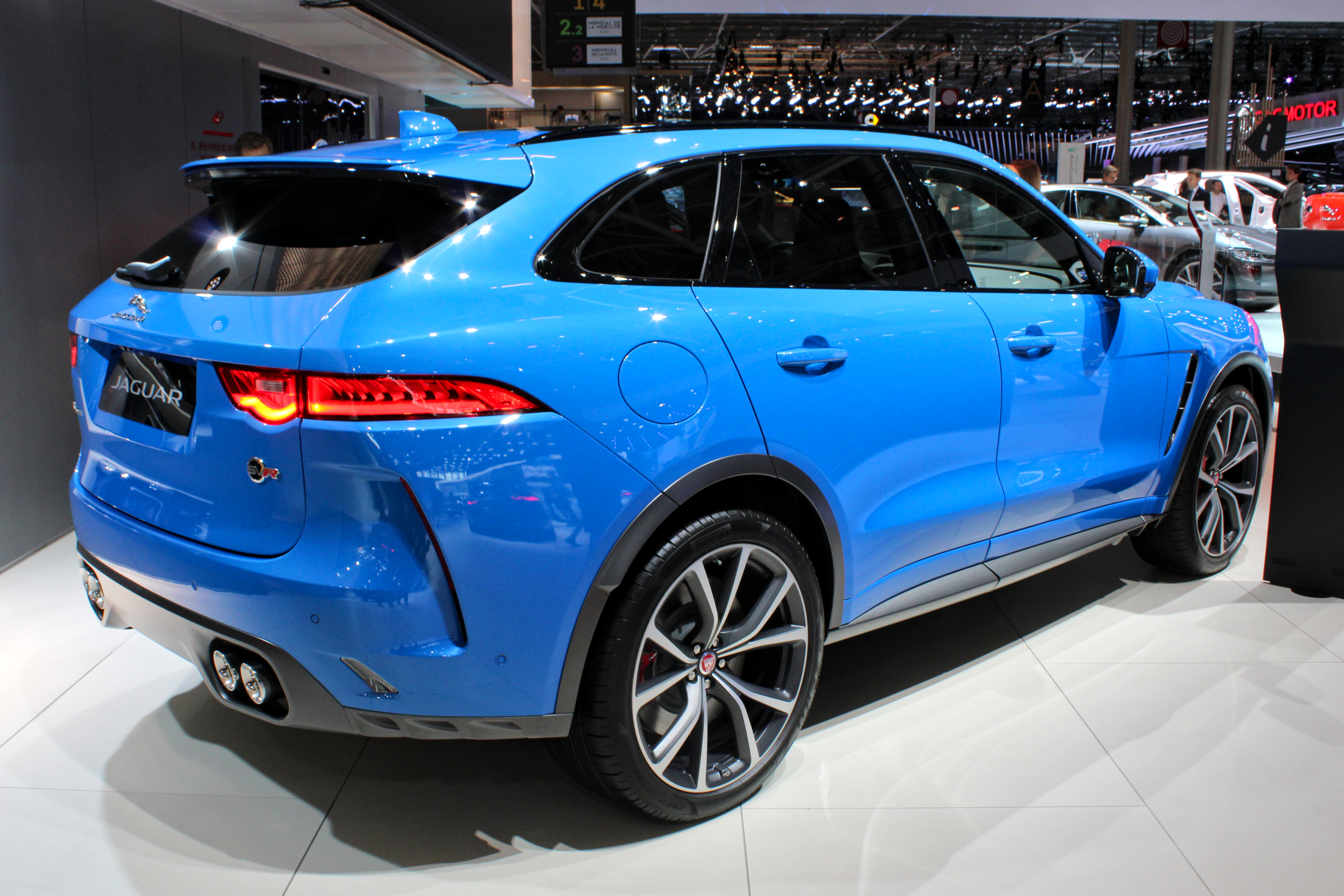
2018 F-Pace SVR

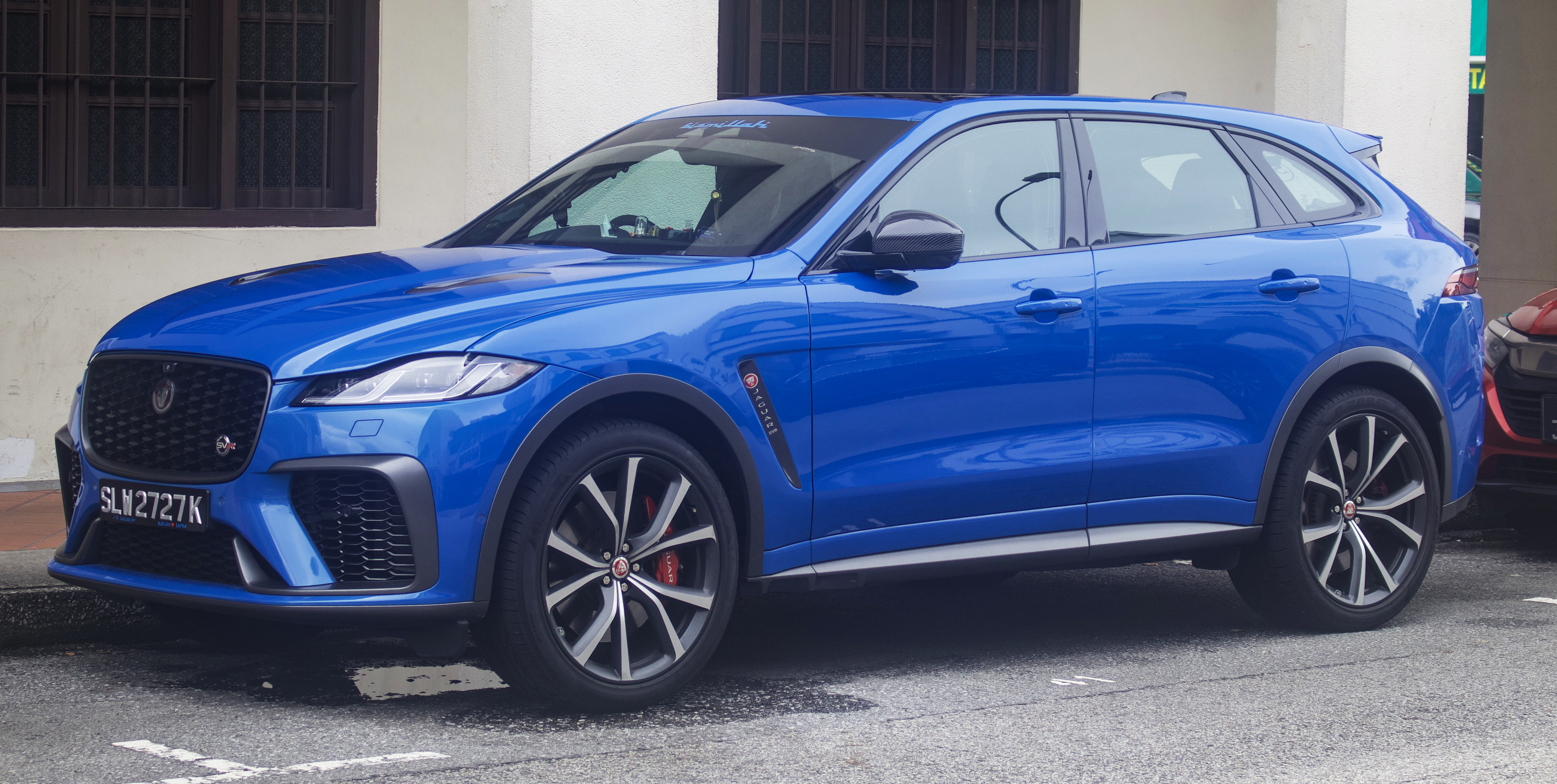
Jaguar F-Pace SVR (facelift)

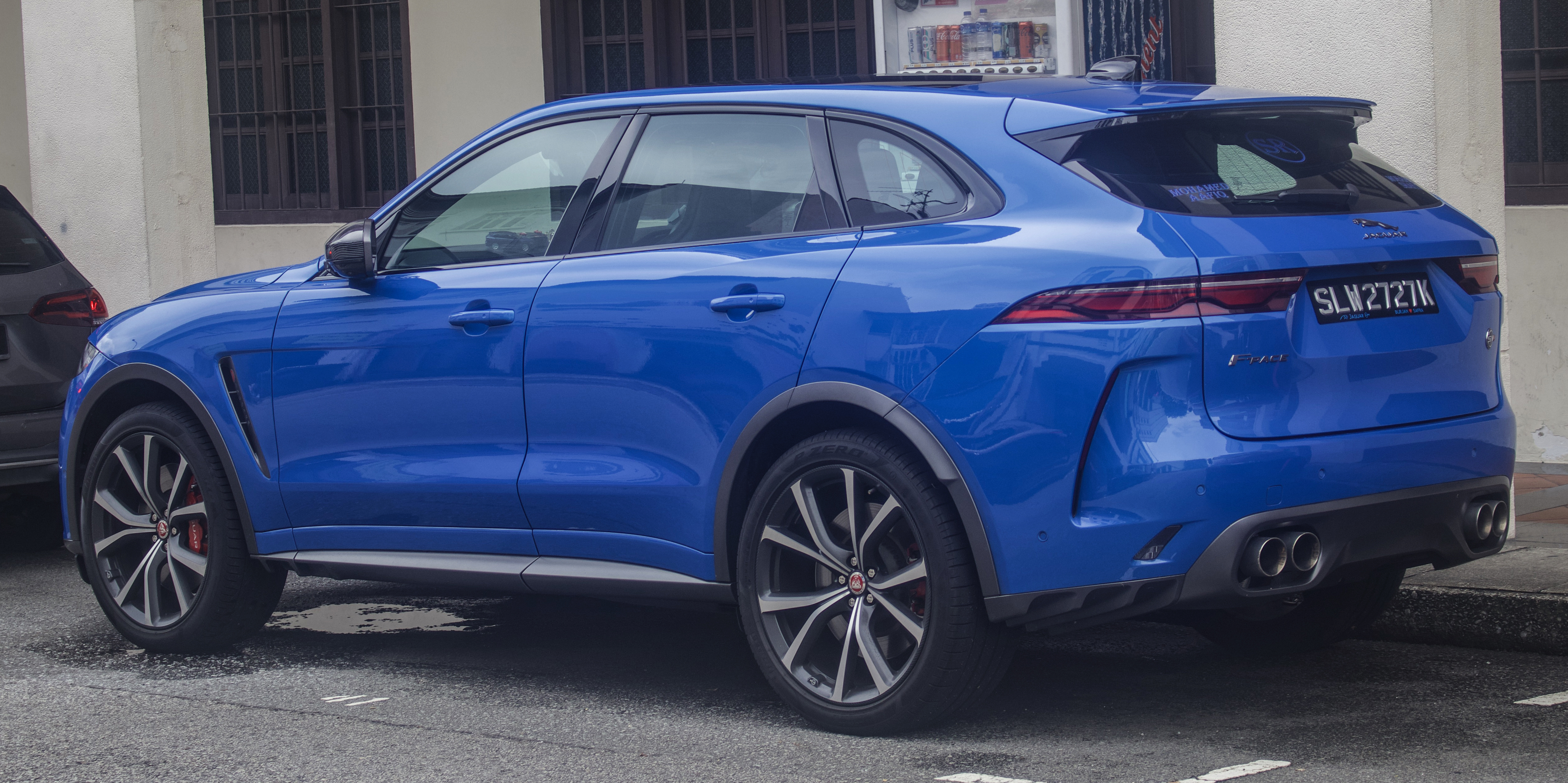
Jaguar F-Pace SVR (facelift)

== Chassis ==
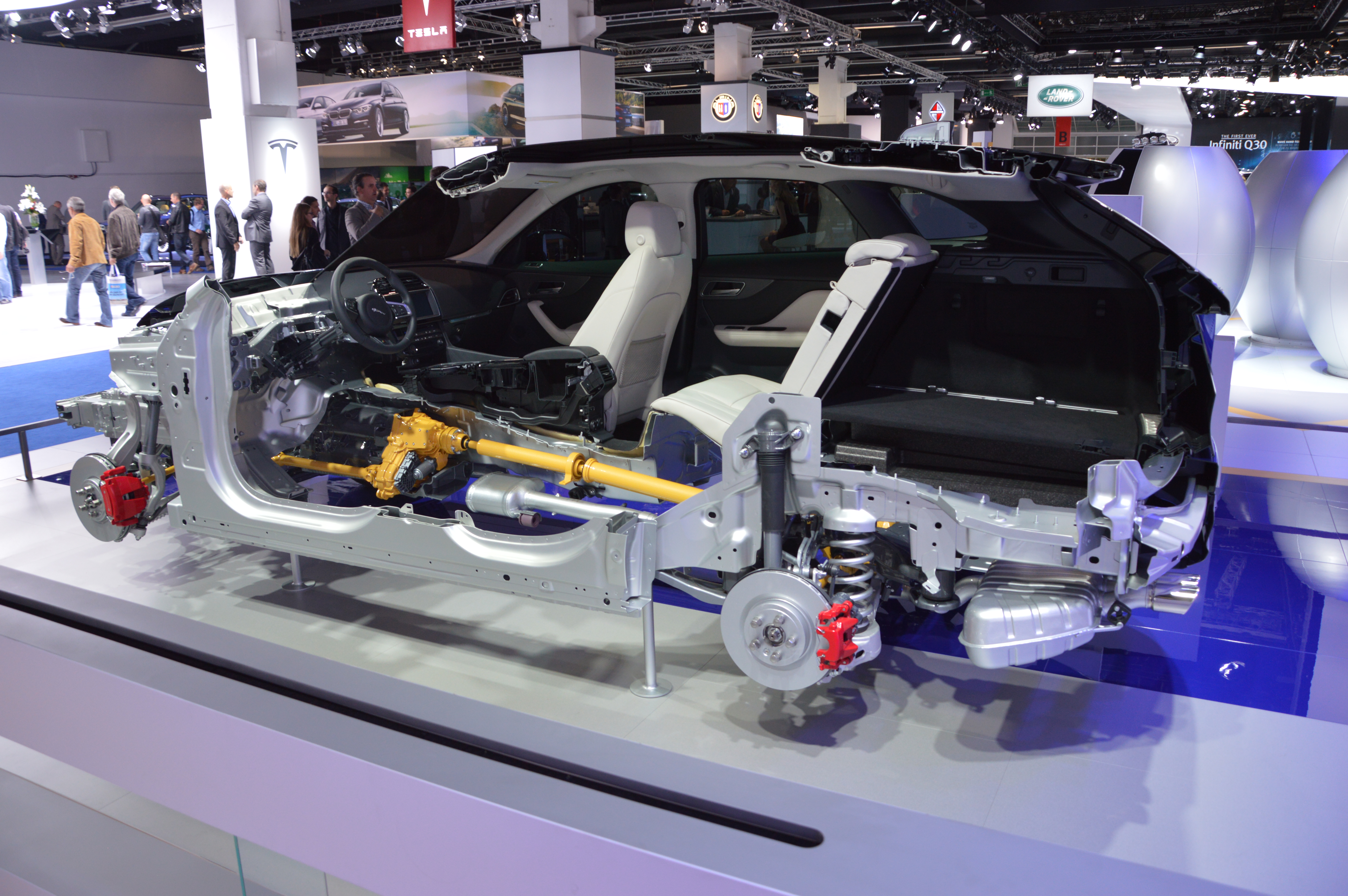
F-Pace cutaway

The F-Pace chassis was the third model to be built on Jaguar Land Rover's iQ-Al (D7a) modular platform, which was also used for the XE, the second generation XF, and the Range Rover Velar. The design features double wishbone suspension at the front, with similarities to the system fitted to the XF and F-Type models, and the rear features an entirely new subframe mounted multi-link suspension system, named by Jaguar as Integral Link. This system was a more costly combination to manufacture but allowed for a greater tuning to provide a good balance between handling and ride quality.

== Interior ==
The interior of the F-Pace features several existing Jaguar design cues, including the rotary gear selector which rises when the car is started. The central console, when equipped with the upgraded InControl Touch Pro system, features a 10.2 in (25.9 cm) touch screen allowing access to in-car entertainment, satellite navigation, and various vehicular settings, such as the G-Meter and engine/gear shift/steering/suspension parameters. Navigation can also be shown full-screen in 3D on an additional 12.3-inch HD virtual instrument cluster. The F-Pace features smartphone connectivity with Wifi Hotspot, and some models allow the owner to control the vehicle remotely, pre-heating the interior or unlocking the car using a smartphone application. The F-Pace was also the first vehicle in Jaguar's range to feature the Activity Key, a waterproof wrist band that unlocks the F-Pace allowing the main keys to be left inside, thus preventing possible water damage.

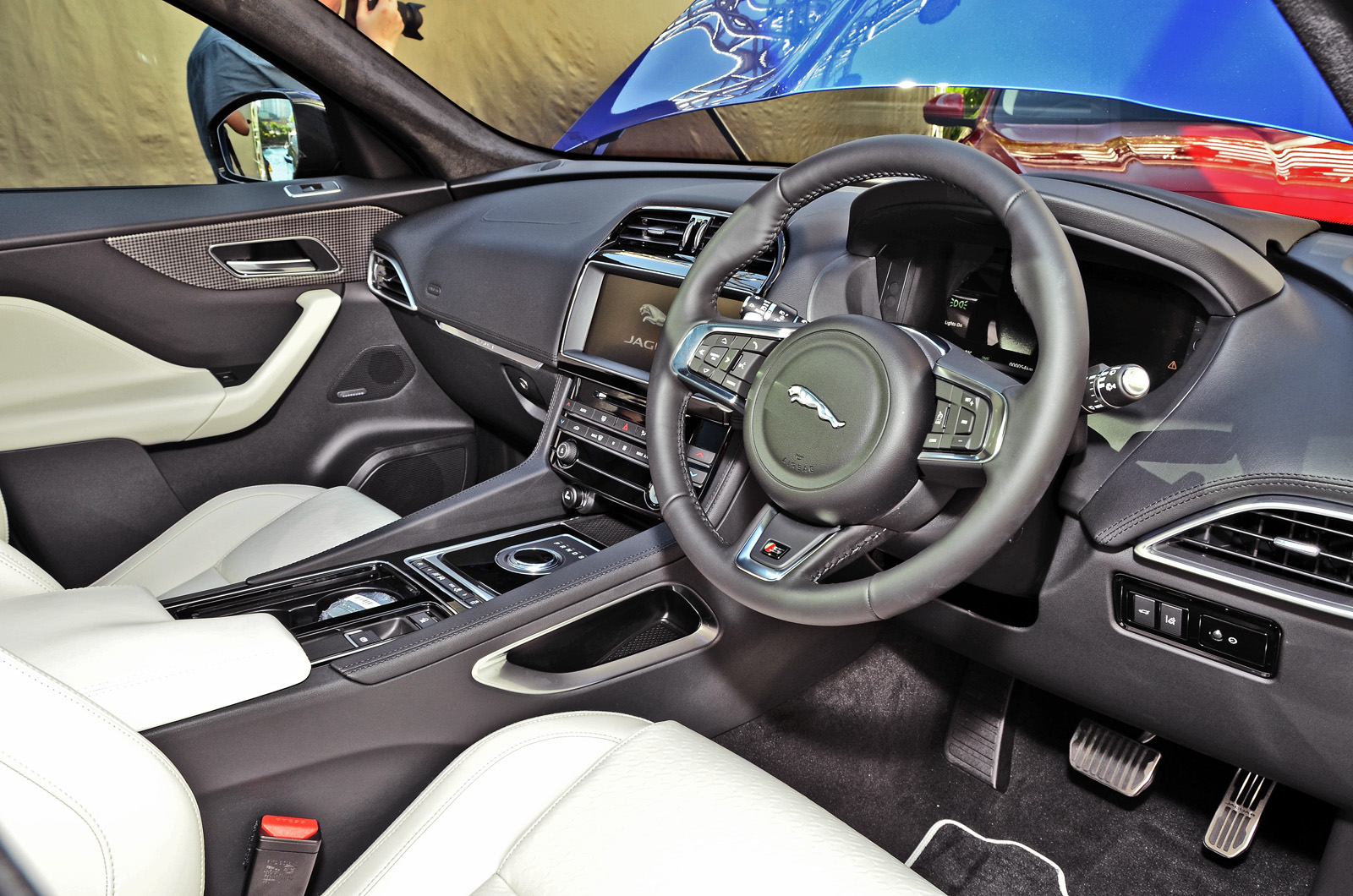
S First Edition's interior, front

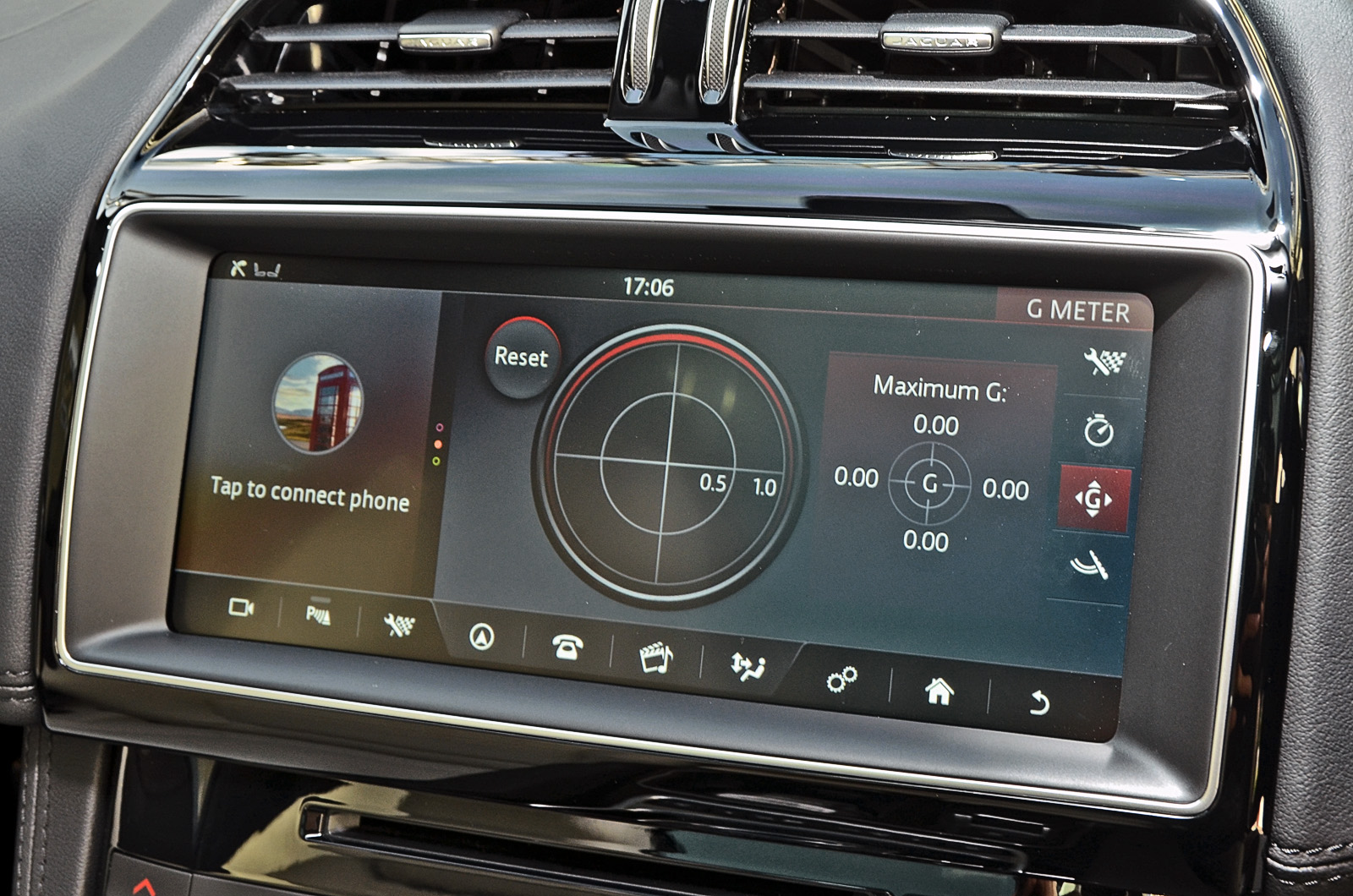
G-Meter interface

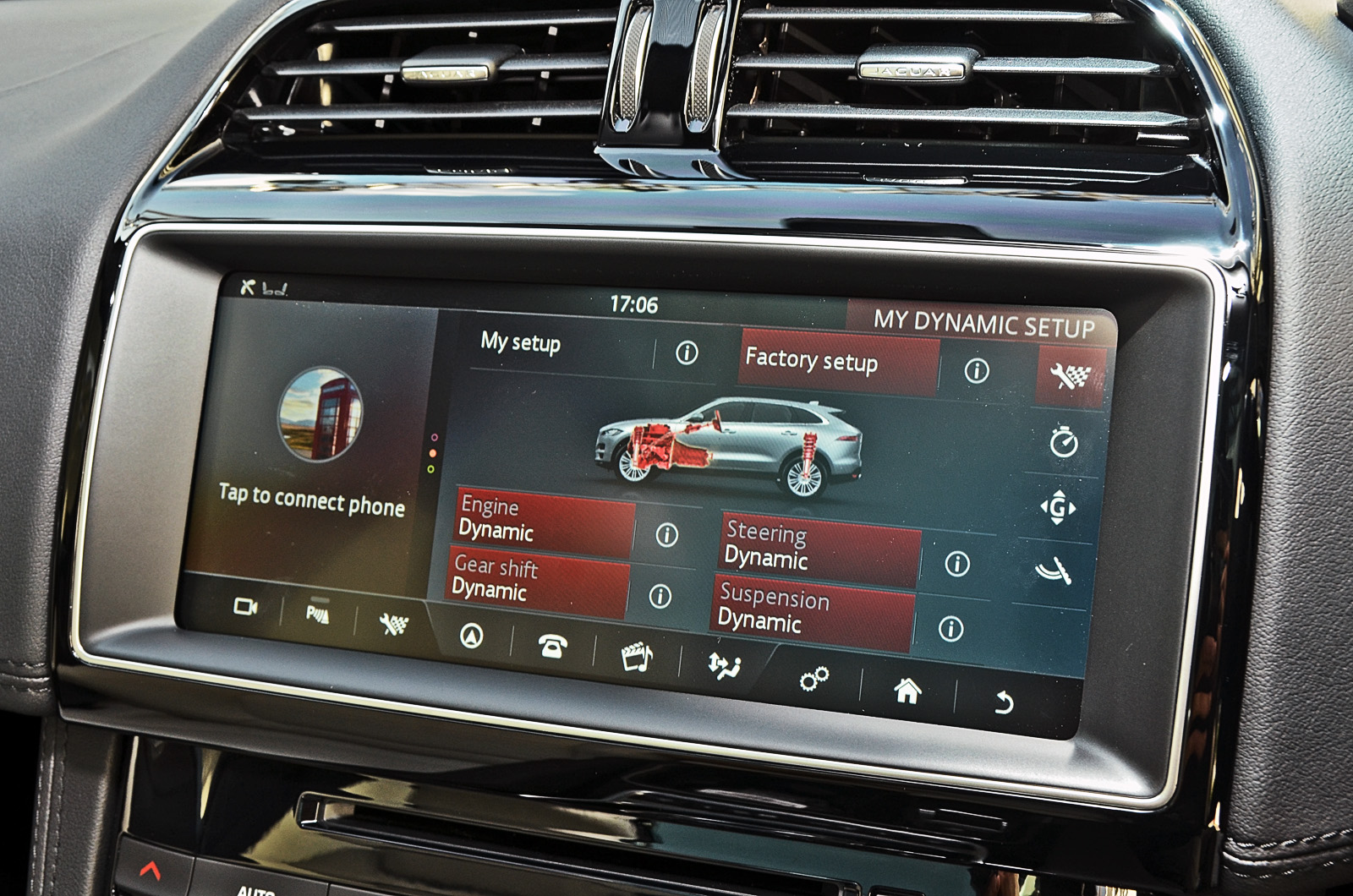
Vehicle dynamics settings interface

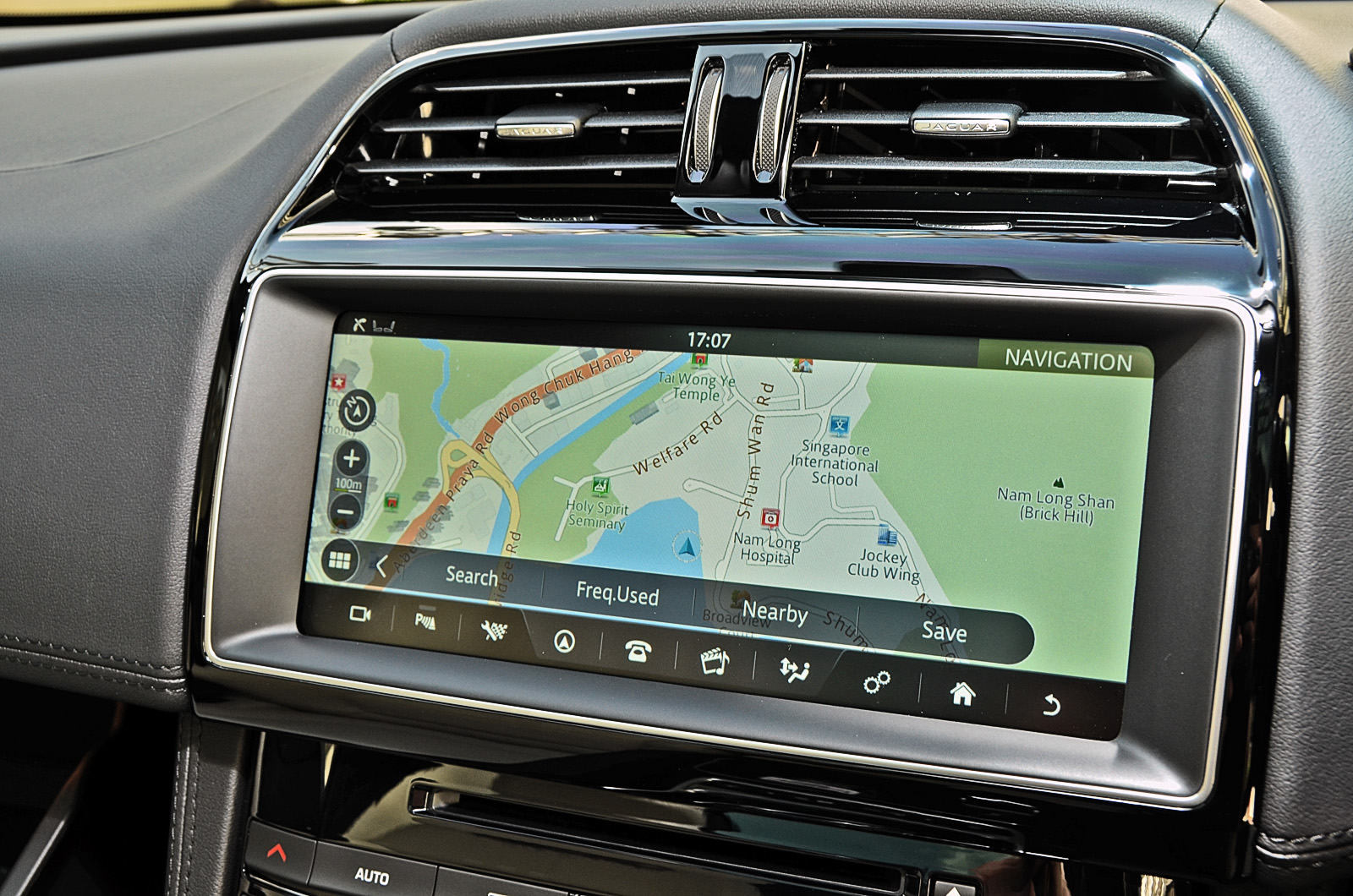
HKDM navigation map view

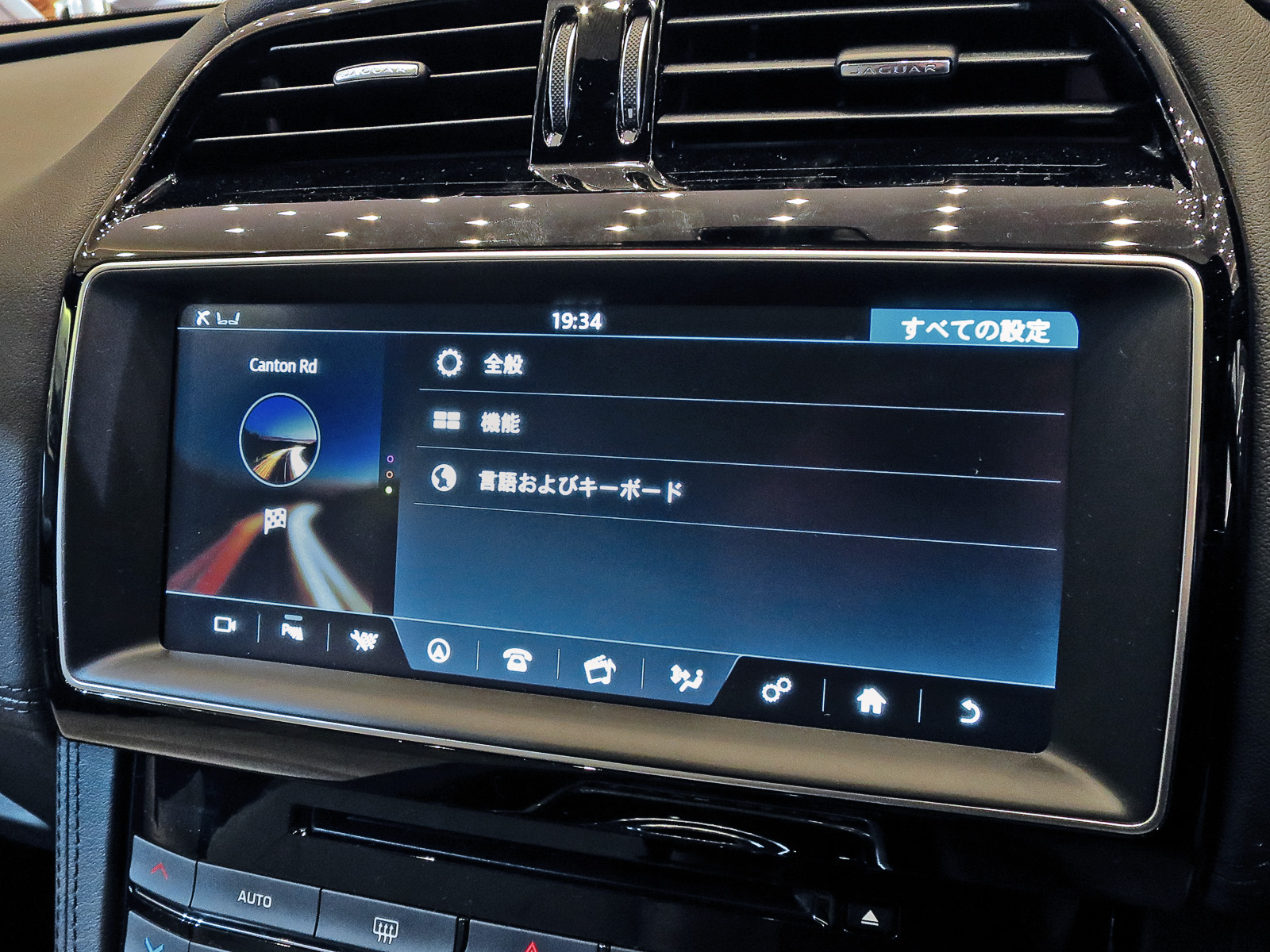
Japanese GUI and voice guidance

== Safety ==
ANCAP test results Jaguar F-Pace (2017, aligned with Euro NCAP)
Test	Points	%
Overall:	5 /5 stars	
Adult occupant:	35.5	93%
Child occupant:	41.9	85%
Pedestrian:	33.9	80%
Safety assist:	8.7	72%

== Worldwide sales ==
Although its 2016 sales were for a partial year only, it became the best selling Jaguar model for the year.

Worldwide sales
Year	Sales
2016	45,973
Total	45,973

China sales
Year	Sales
2023	2,055
2024	2,297
2025	238
