= Jaguar C-X17 =

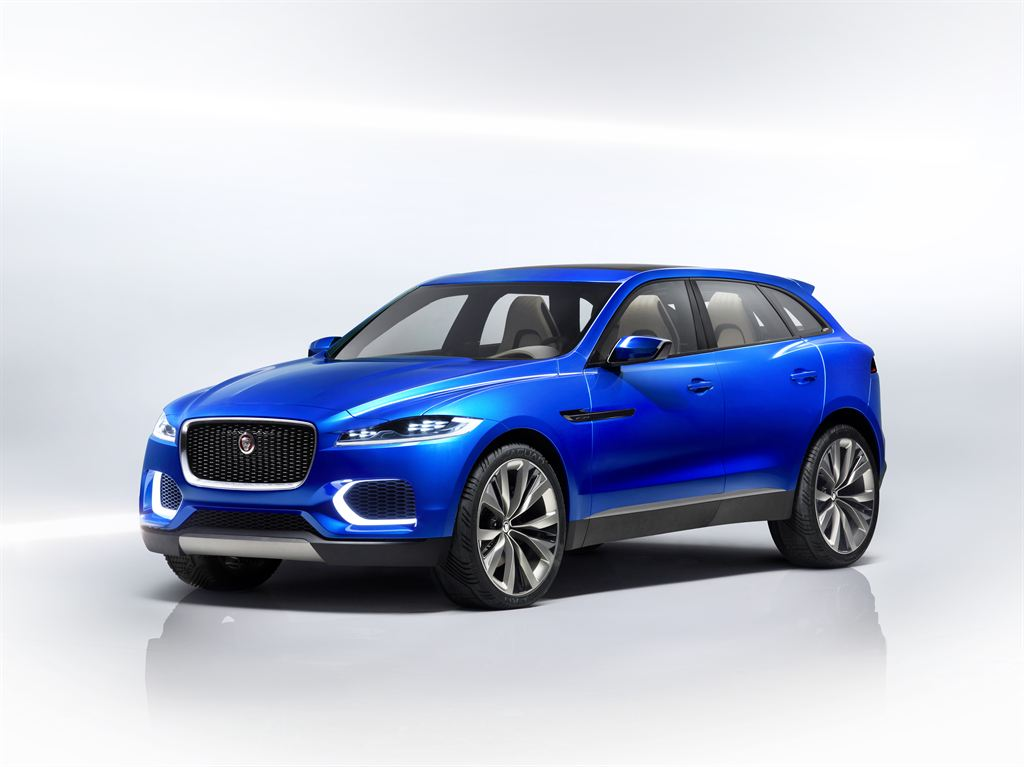

Overview
- Manufacturer: Jaguar Land Rover
- Production: 2013
- Designer: Ian Callum

Body and chassis
- Class: Concept car
- Body style: 5-door SUV
- Layout: Front engine, four-wheel drive
- Platform: iQ[Al]
- Related: Jaguar XE; Jaguar F-Pace

Powertrain
- Engine: 3.0-litre AJ126 340PS 6-cylinder (V6) supercharged petrol
- Transmission: 6 Speed Automatic

Dimensions
- Wheelbase: 2,905 mm (114.4 in)
- Length: 4,718 mm (185.7 in)
- Width: 1,959 mm (77.1 in)
- Height: 1,649 mm (64.9 in)

Chronology
- Successor: Jaguar F-Pace

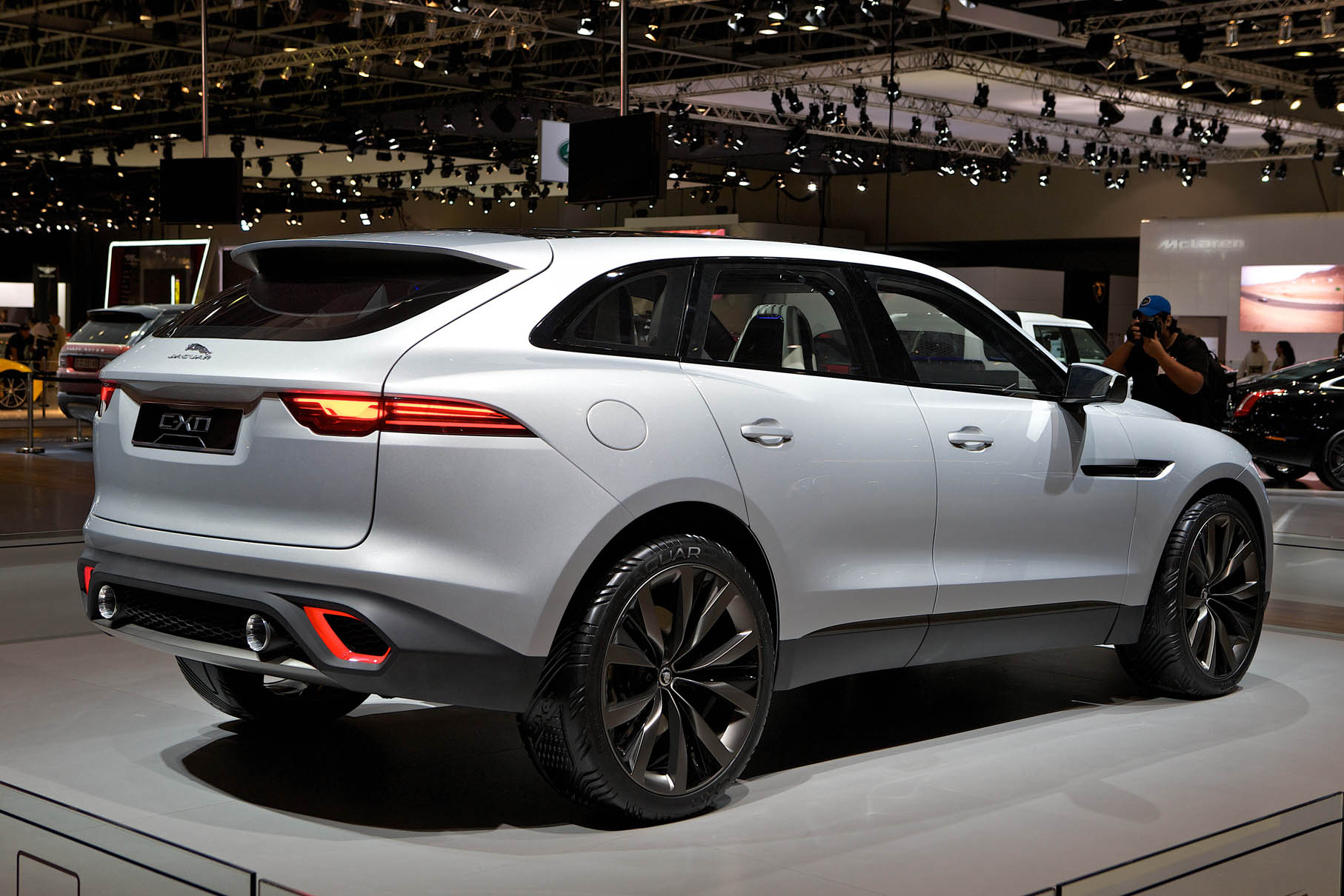
C-X17 at the 2013 Dubai Motor Show

The Jaguar C-X17 is a concept crossover SUV designed by Jaguar Land Rover and unveiled at the 2013 Frankfurt Motor Show. It is the first ever Jaguar crossover SUV.

It was expected that the C-X17 concept would evolve into a production model, and at the 2015 North American International Auto Show it was announced that the production version for 2016 would be called the F-Pace.

== Design ==
The C-X17 features an advanced aluminium monocoque architecture on to which future models will be based on, branded as iQ[Al].

The C-X17 is powered by the 3.0-litre 6-cylinder petrol engine found in the Jaguar XF, Jaguar XJ and Jaguar F-Type and is equipped with a rear-biased intelligent all-wheel drive system. The all-aluminium suspension is complemented by torque vectoring, which brakes the inside wheel. The platform is designed to handle a new range of 2.0-litre four-cylinder engines designed by Jaguar Land Rover as well as the current six-cylinder engine range.
