= Jaguar R and SVR models =

Jaguar R, Jaguar R-S/SVR

Overview
- Manufacturer: Jaguar
- Production: 1995–2025
- Assembly: Jaguar Land Rover; Castle Bromwich Assembly

Body and chassis
- Class: Sports cars (S)
- Layout: Front-engine, all-wheel-drive
- Related: Jaguar XJ220

Jaguar R and R-S/SVR models are a range of high performance versions of certain car models from the British automotive marque Jaguar Cars, part of parent business Jaguar Land Rover. These cars primarily focus on enhanced "sport" performance. Jaguar began producing R models in 1988 with the introduction of the first XJR, and began producing R-S models in limited production numbers and input from Jaguar SVO (Special Vehicle Operations) with the introduction of the 2012 XKR-S. The R-S mark has since been replaced by the SVR (Special Vehicle Racing) designation, which was first introduced on the 2017 Jaguar F-Type SVR, effectively making the XFR-S the last Jaguar SVO car not to carry the SVR moniker.

== History ==
The 1995 XJR was powered by a supercharged 6-cylinder engine, the car produced approximately 322 horsepower. With the revamped line of engines, the powerplant would be based on an eight-cylinder engine with supercharger from 1997 to present. The 1997–2003 XJR produced 370 horsepower (276 kW) and 385 pound-feet (522 N⋅m) of torque, taking the car to 60 mph (97 km/h) in 5 seconds. The new aluminium bodyshell from 2004 to 2009 and increased power to 400 hp (298 kW) and enhanced computer systems decreased the time to 60 mph (97 km/h) to 4.8 seconds. Starting after year 2000, XJRs were equipped with Jaguar's CATS (Computer Active Technology Suspension), which helped firm up the ride in sporty driving without compromising comfort during day-to-day use.

The first XKR was introduced in 1997 and kept with the same power increases as the XJR except for after 2006 the power in the XKR was boosted to 420 hp (313 kW). The S-Type R had a short production run from 2003 to 2008, and came equipped with the same 400 horsepower (298 kW) supercharged V8 as the other R models. It was replaced by the XFR, featuring a 5.0 L supercharged V8 producing 510 hp (380 kW) R-S models were then added to the range starting with the XKR-S in 2012 and later in 2014, the XFR-S. Both these cars produced 550bhp, boasting zero to sixty times of sub 4 seconds. With the introduction of the F Type R some two years later, the then-to-be called Jaguar F-Type R-S was renamed the F-Type SVR along with the all future Special Vehicle Operations (SVO) cars in the model range.

The SVO (Special Vehicles Operations) mark is used on several high performance Jaguar models

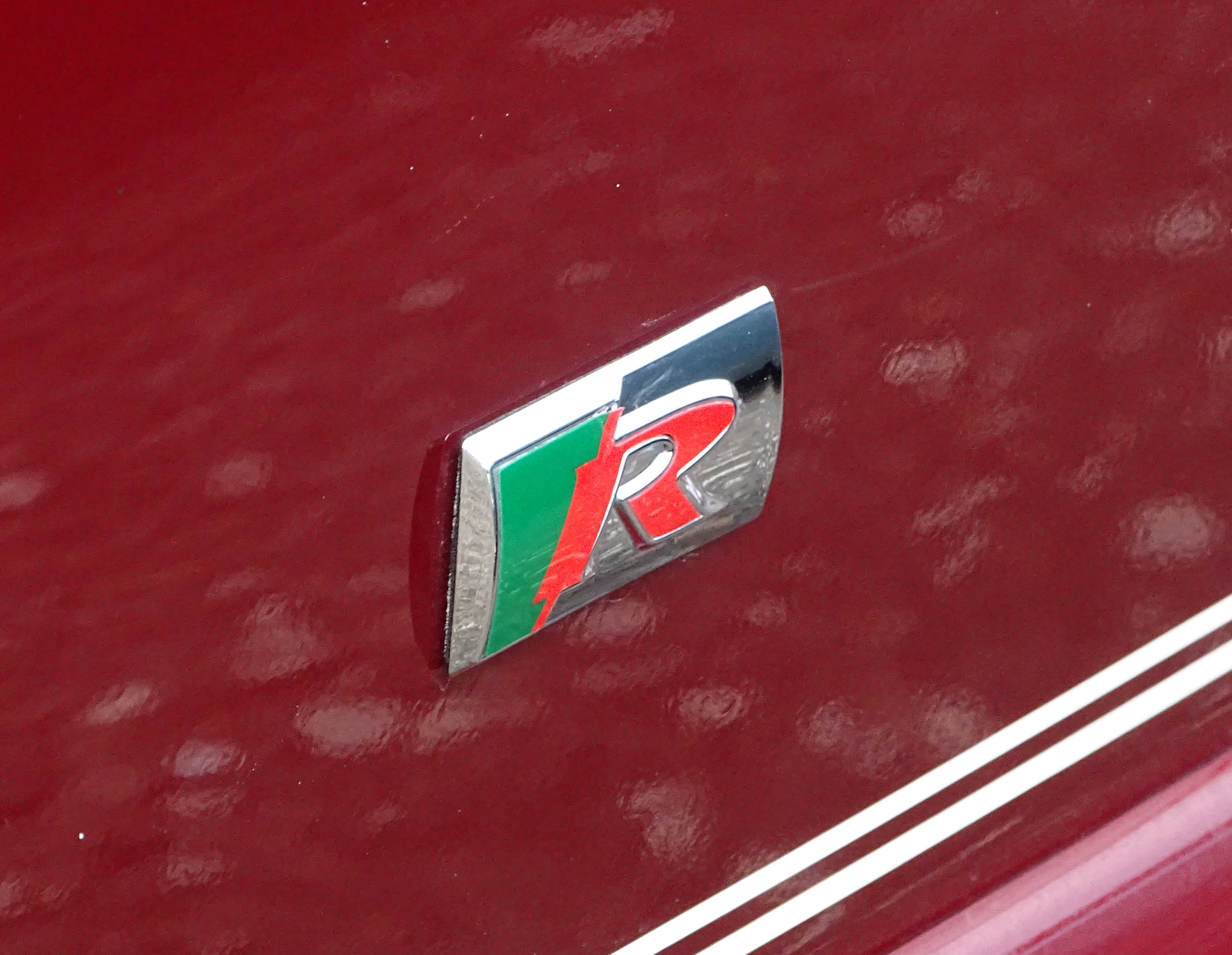
Old Jaguar R logo

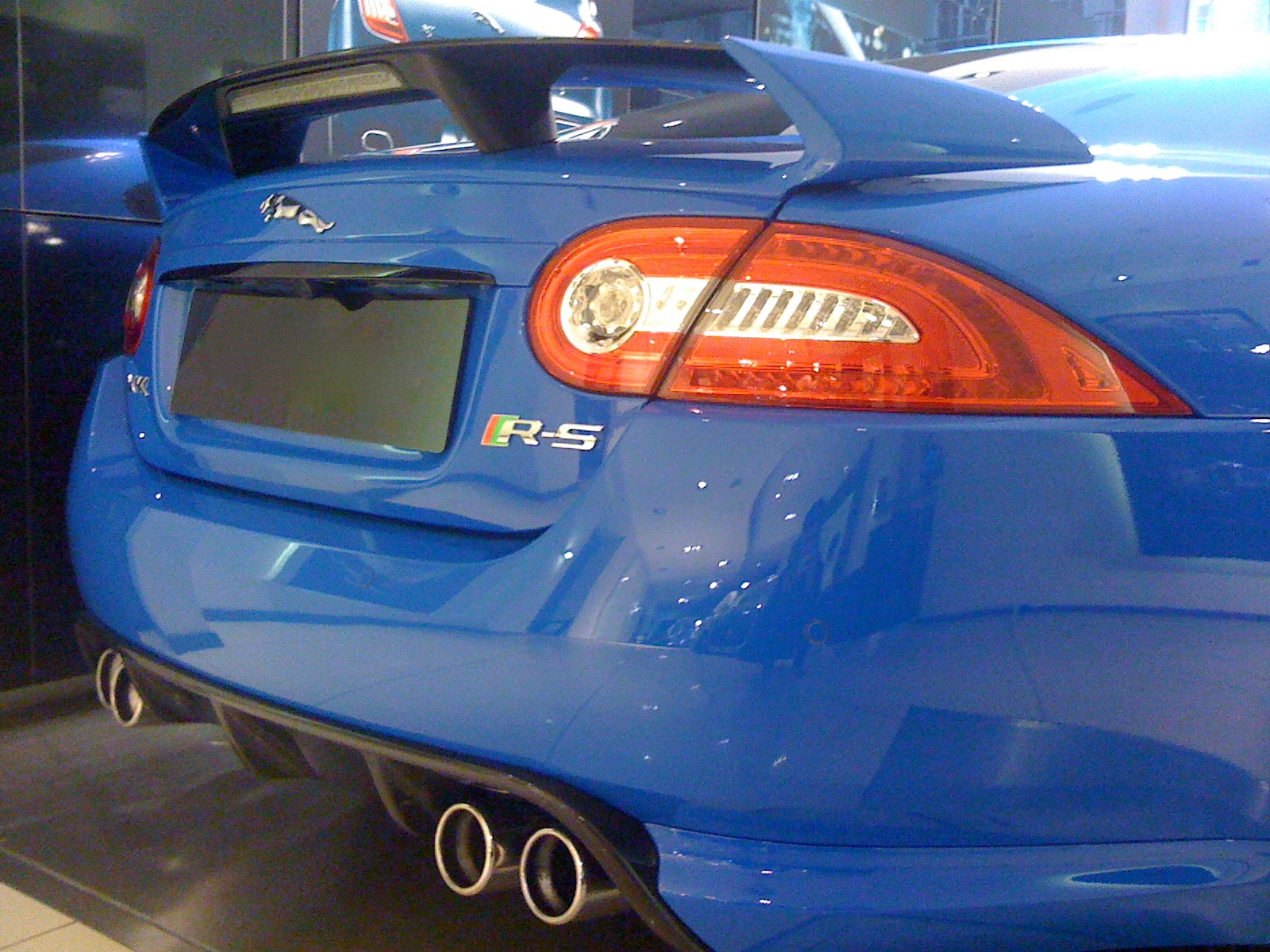
Closeup of the Jaguar XKR-S, showing the R-S logo

== Models ==
Years of Production	Model	Generation Codename	Engine Displacement	Engine Format	Engine Power	Body	Front	Rear
1988–1993	XJR	XJ40	3.6-litre 4.0-litre	I6	251 hp (187 kW)	Full-size luxury saloon		
1988–1993	XJR-S	HE	5.3-litre 6.0-litre	V12	318 hp (237 kW); 328 hp (245 kW)	Coupé		
1994–1997	XJR	X306	4.0-litre	I6	321 hp (239 kW)	Full-size luxury saloon		
1997–2002	Jaguar XKR	X100	4.0-litre	V8	400 hp (298 kW)	Coupé and cabriolet		
1997–2003	XJR	X308	4.0-litre	V8	370 hp (276 kW)	Full-size luxury saloon		
2002–2007	S-Type R	X308	4.2-litre	V8	400 hp (298 kW)	Executive saloon		
2003–2009	XJR	X350	4.2-litre	V8	400 hp (298 kW)	Full-size luxury saloon		
2006–2014	Jaguar XKR	X150	4.2-litre 5.0-litre	V8	410 hp (306 kW); 510 hp (380 kW)	Coupé and cabriolet		
2009–2014	Jaguar XKR-S	X150	4.2-litre 5.0-litre	V8	420 hp (313 kW); 550 hp (410 kW)	Coupé and cabriolet		
2009–2015	XFR	X250	5.0-litre	V8	510 hp (380 kW)	Executive saloon		
2012–2015	XFR-S	X250	5.0-litre	V8	550 hp (410 kW)	Executive saloon and Sportbrake		
2013–2019	XJR	X351	5.0-litre	V8	550 hp (410 kW); 575 hp (429 kW) (XJR575)	Full-size luxury saloon		
2013–2020	F-Type R	X152	5.0-litre	V8	550 hp (410 kW)	Coupé and cabriolet		
2016–2020	F-Type SVR	X152	5.0-litre	V8	575 hp (429 kW)	Coupé and cabriolet		
2017–2019	XE SV Project 8	X760	5.0-litre	V8	600 hp (447 kW)	Super saloon		
2018–2025	F-Pace SVR	X761	5.0-litre	V8	550 hp (410 kW); 575 hp (429 kW) (575 Edition)	Luxury compact crossover SUV		
2020–2023	F-Type R P575	X152	5.0-litre	V8	575 hp (429 kW)	Coupé and cabriolet		

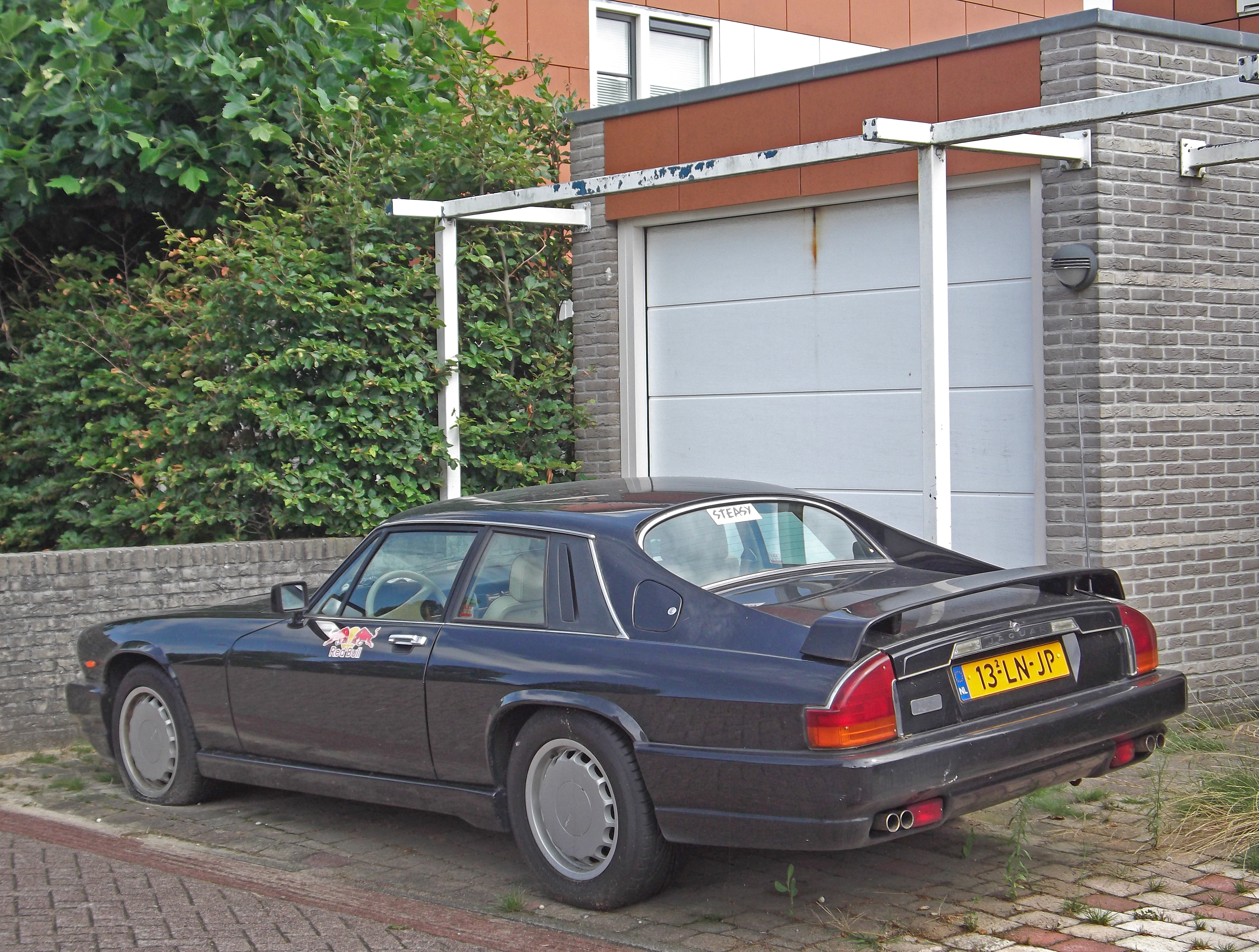
Pre-facelift 1988-1990 XJR-S

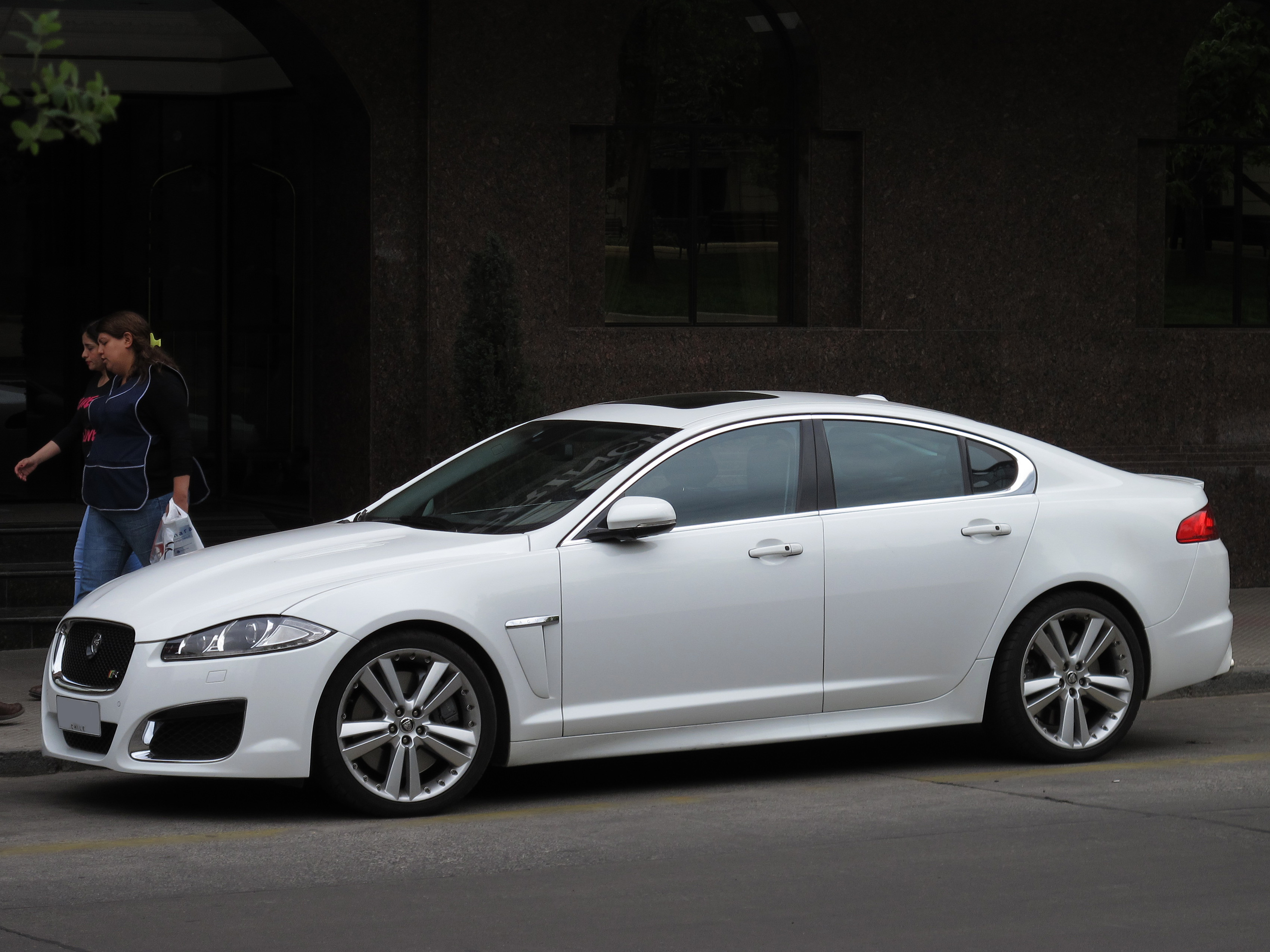
Post-facelift 2011-2015 XFR

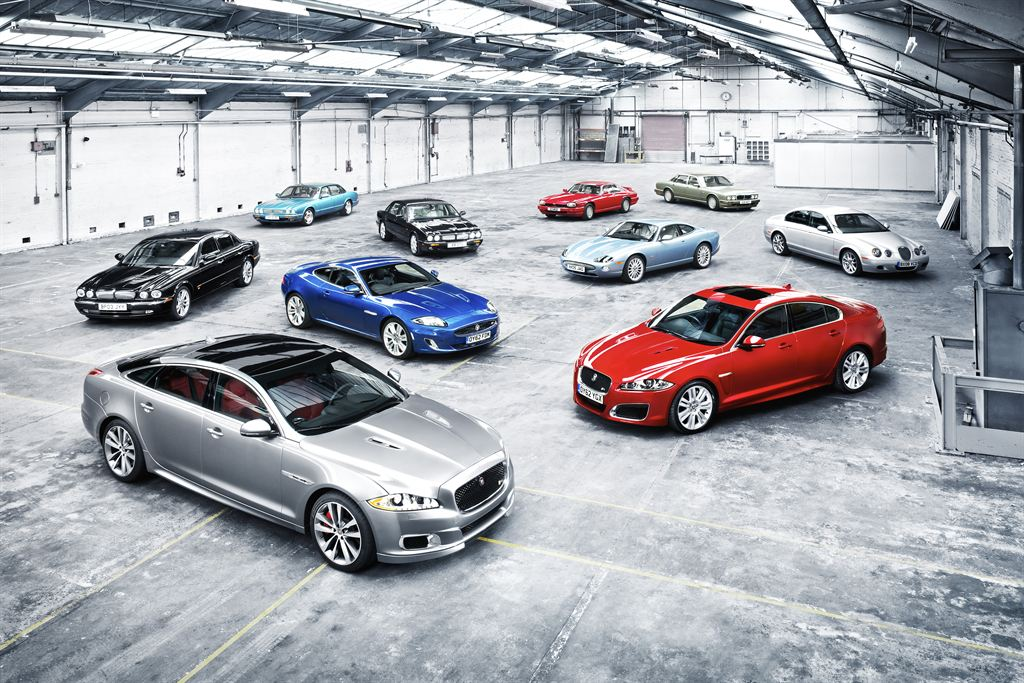
Promotional image released in 2013 for the 25th anniversary celebrations for the R division

== S Models ==
Positioned below the R and SVR ranges, Jaguar offers an S variant on many of their vehicles, which includes sportier styling on both the exterior and interior, more horsepower and a firmer suspension.

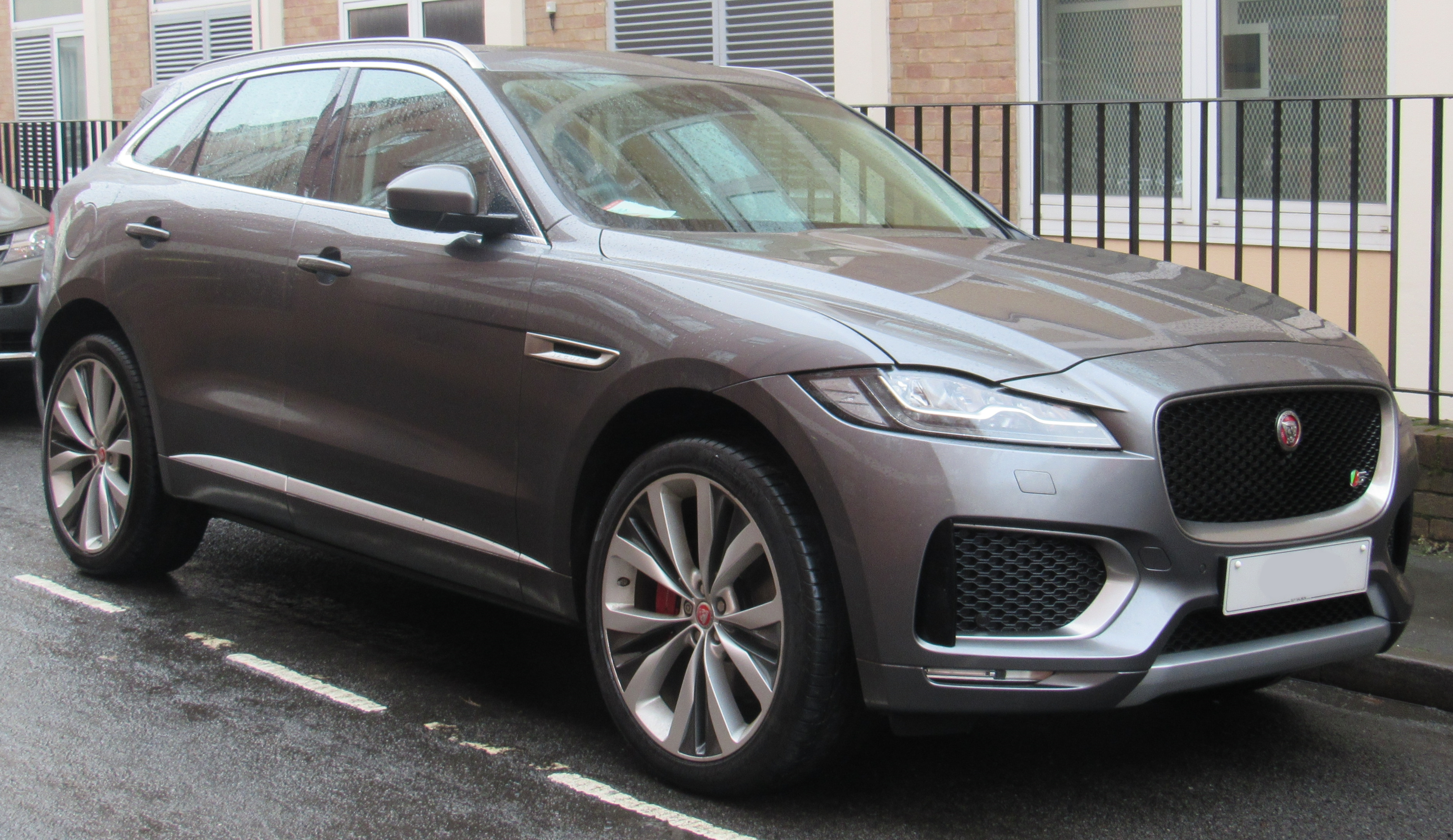
Jaguar F-Pace S (UK)

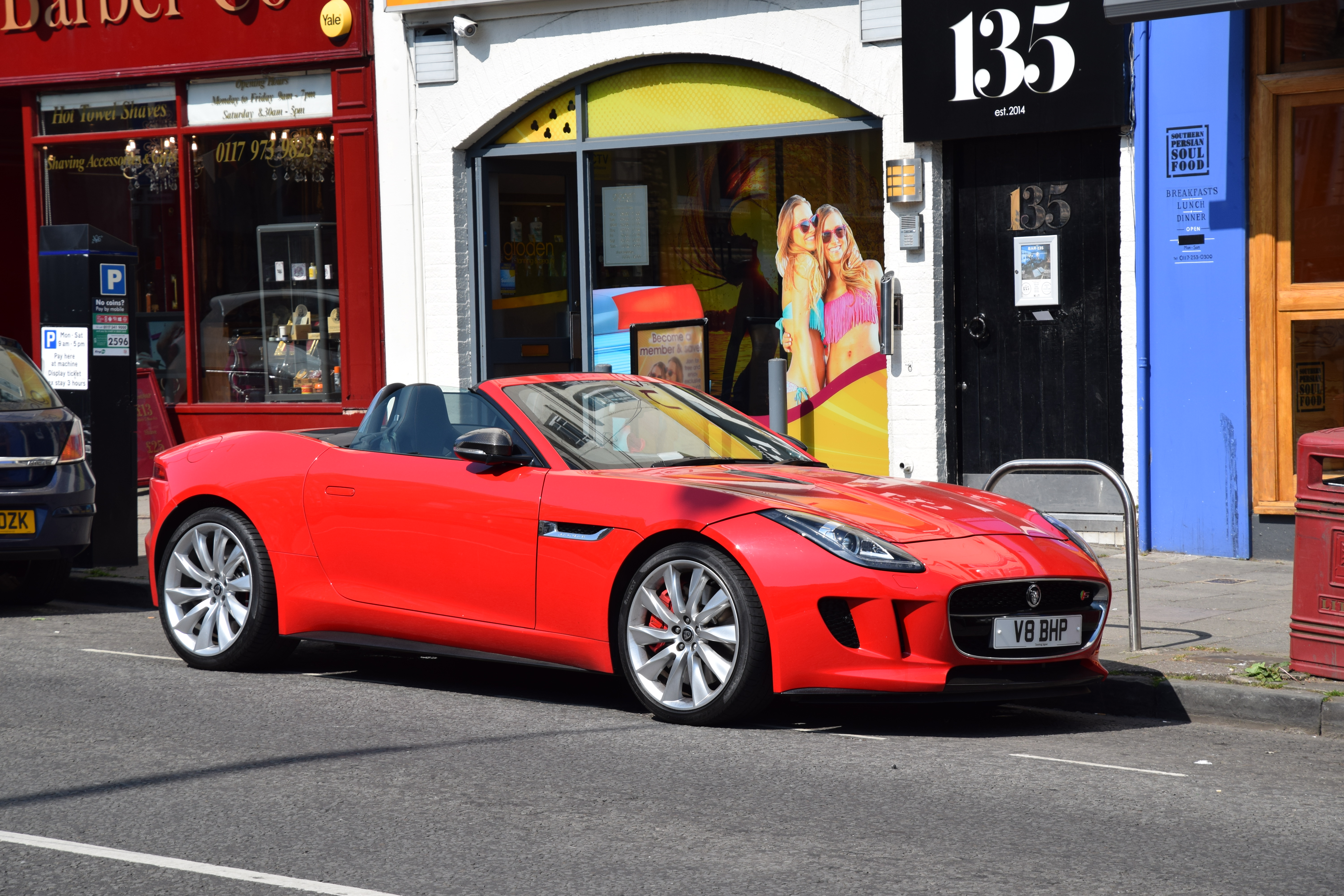
Jaguar F-Type S convertible (UK) - 2013 V8 model

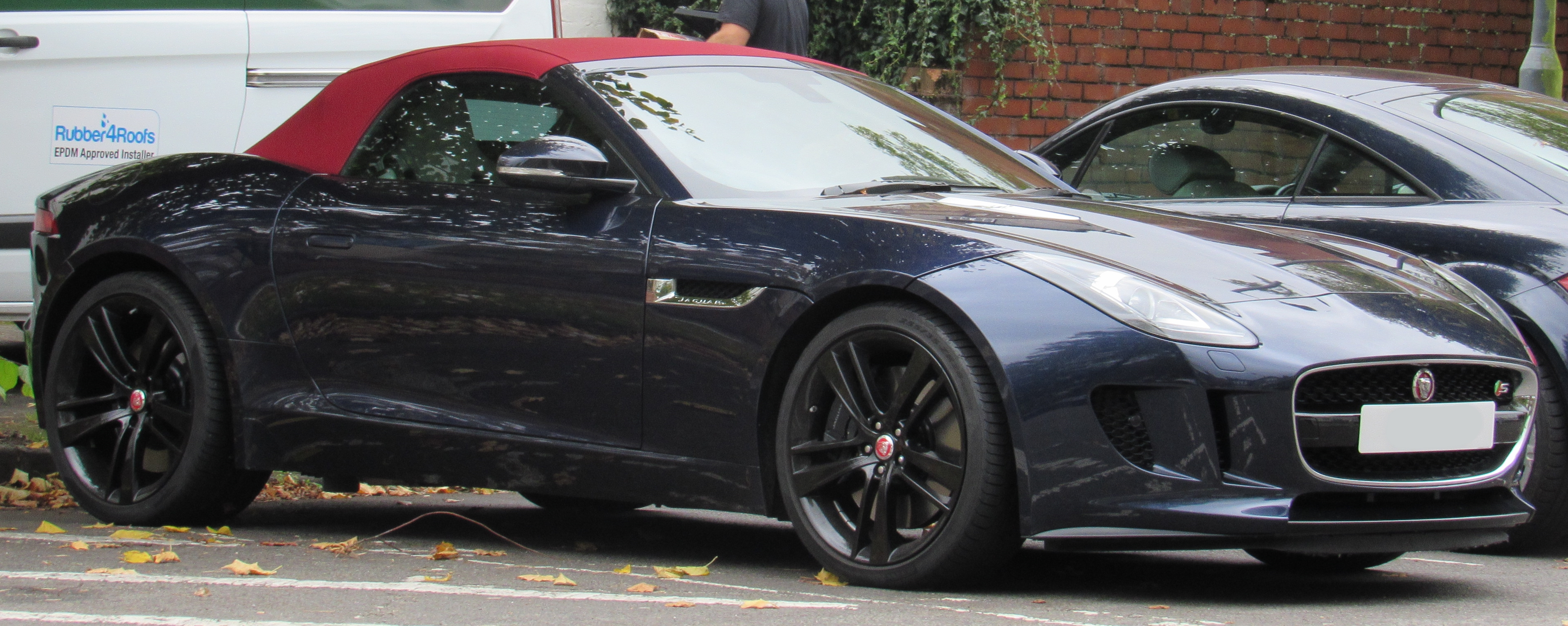
Jaguar F-Type S convertible (UK)

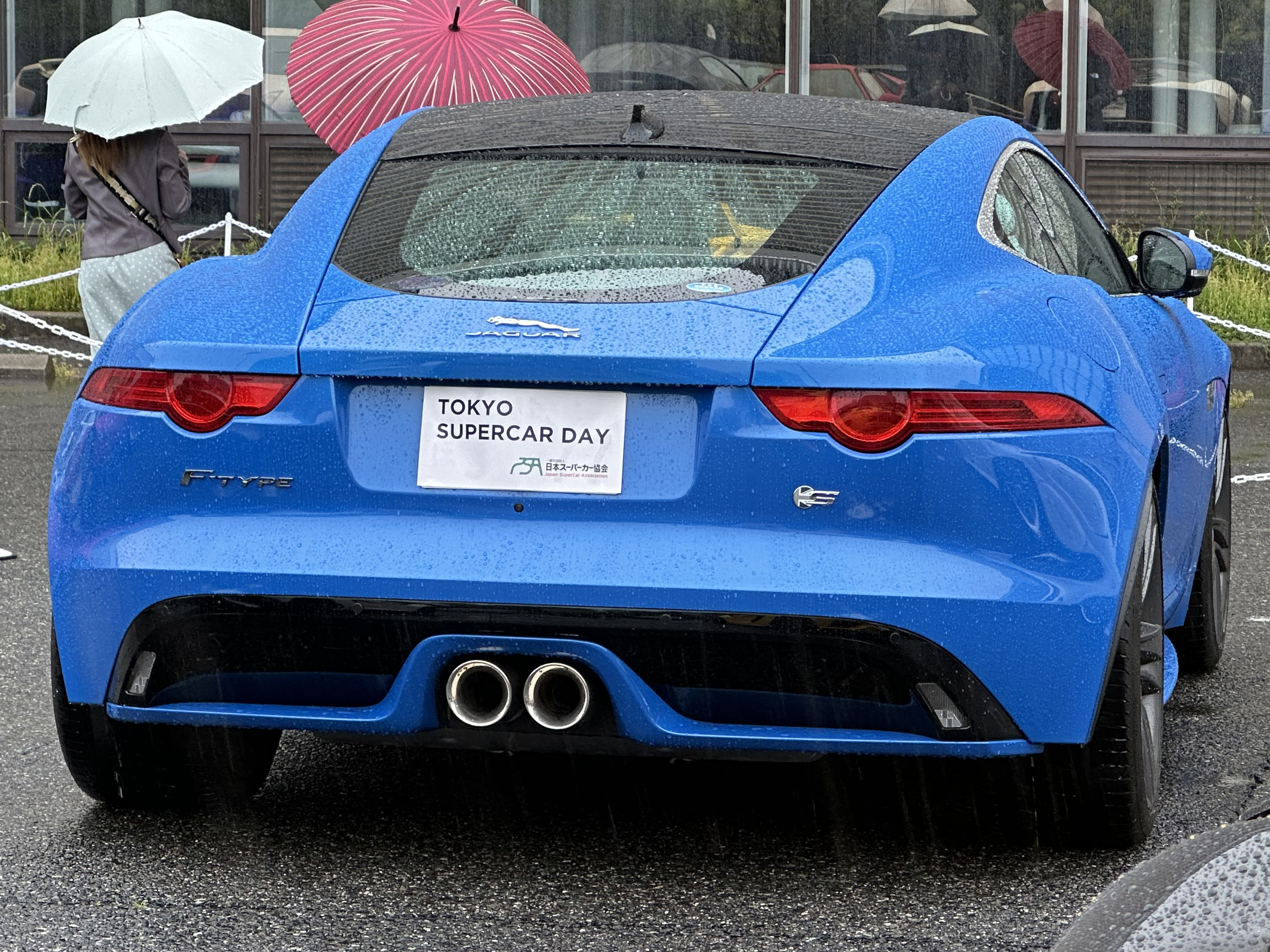
F-Type S coupé (Japan)

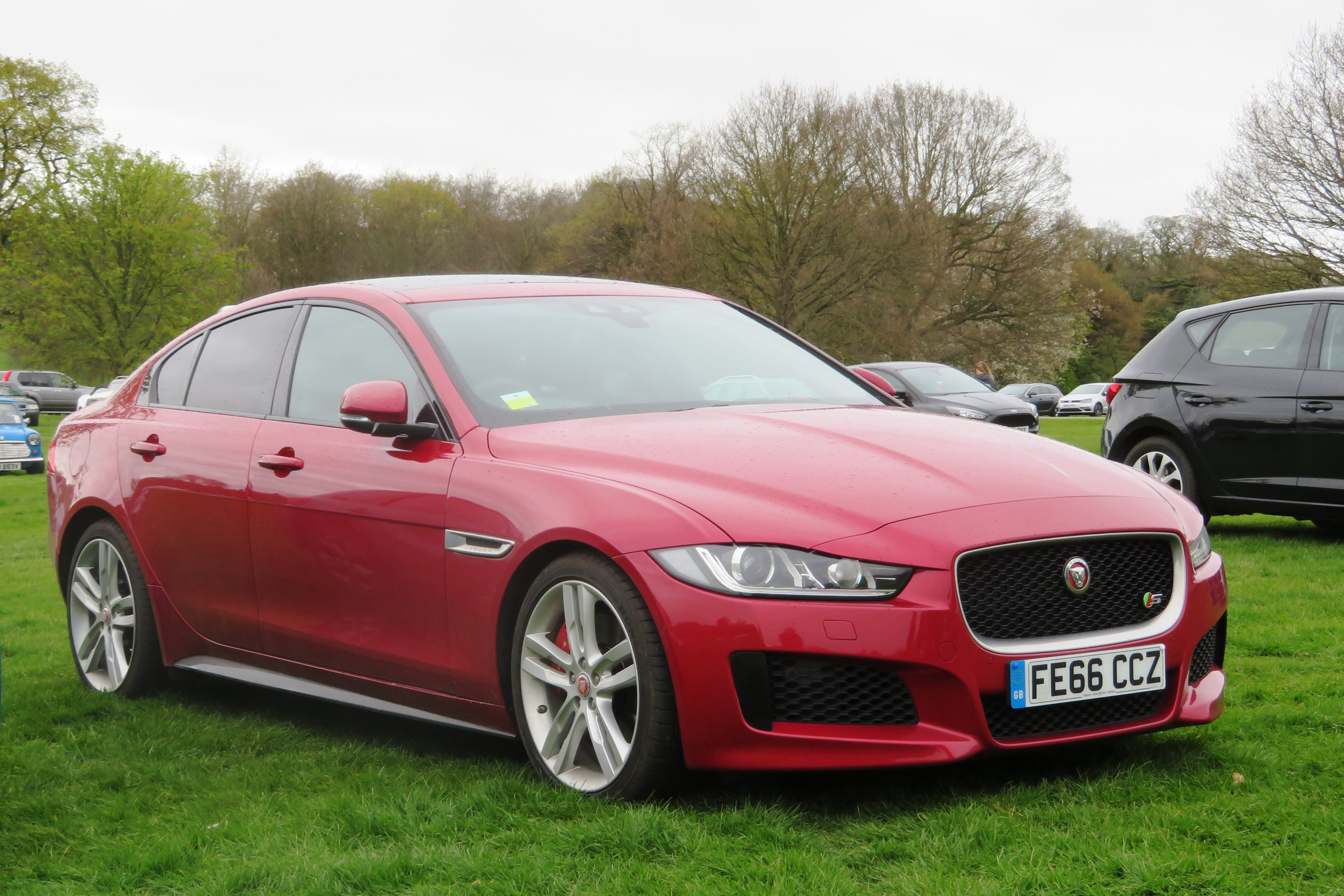
Jaguar XE S (UK)

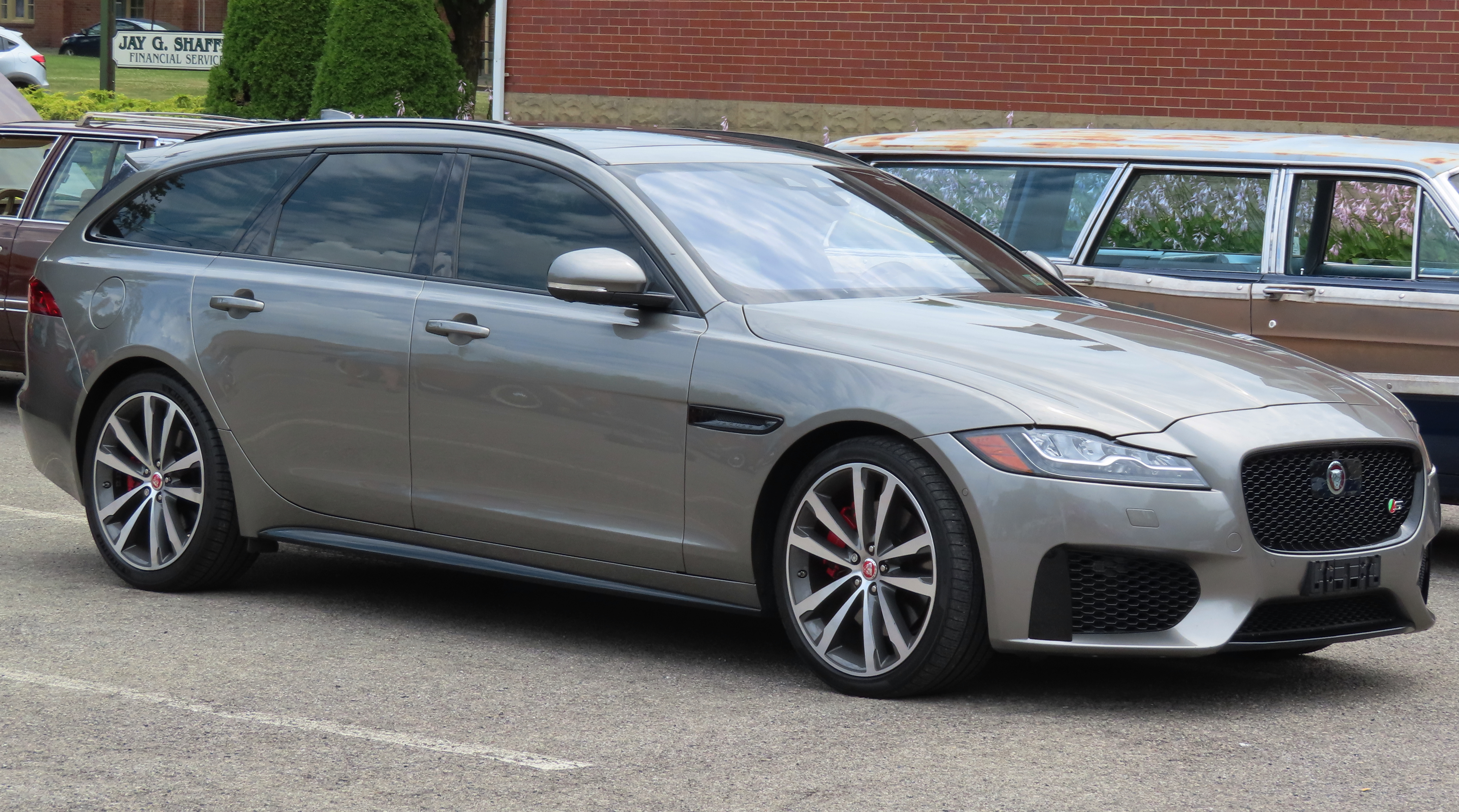
Jaguar XF (X260) S Sportbrake (US)

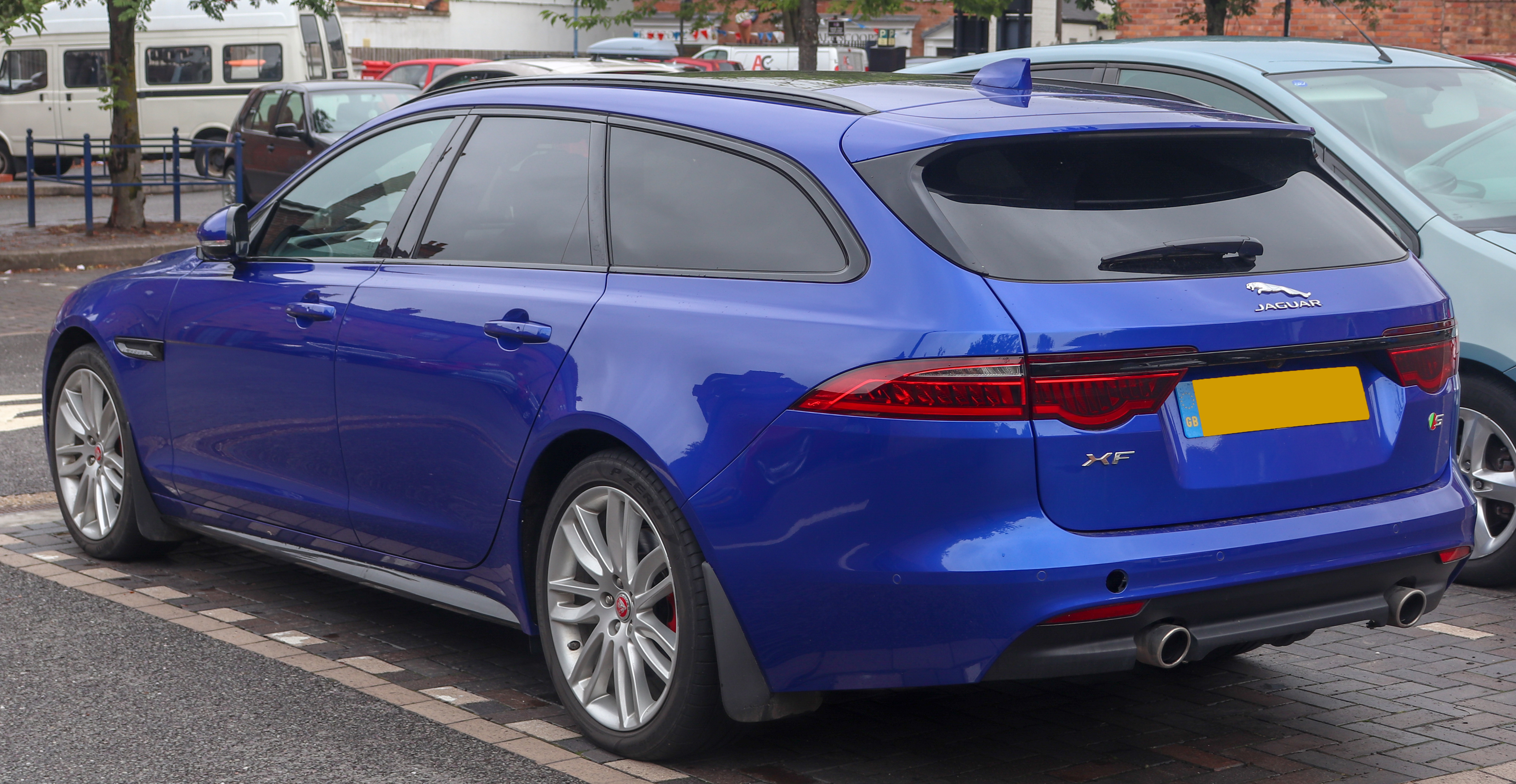
XF S Sportbrake (UK)

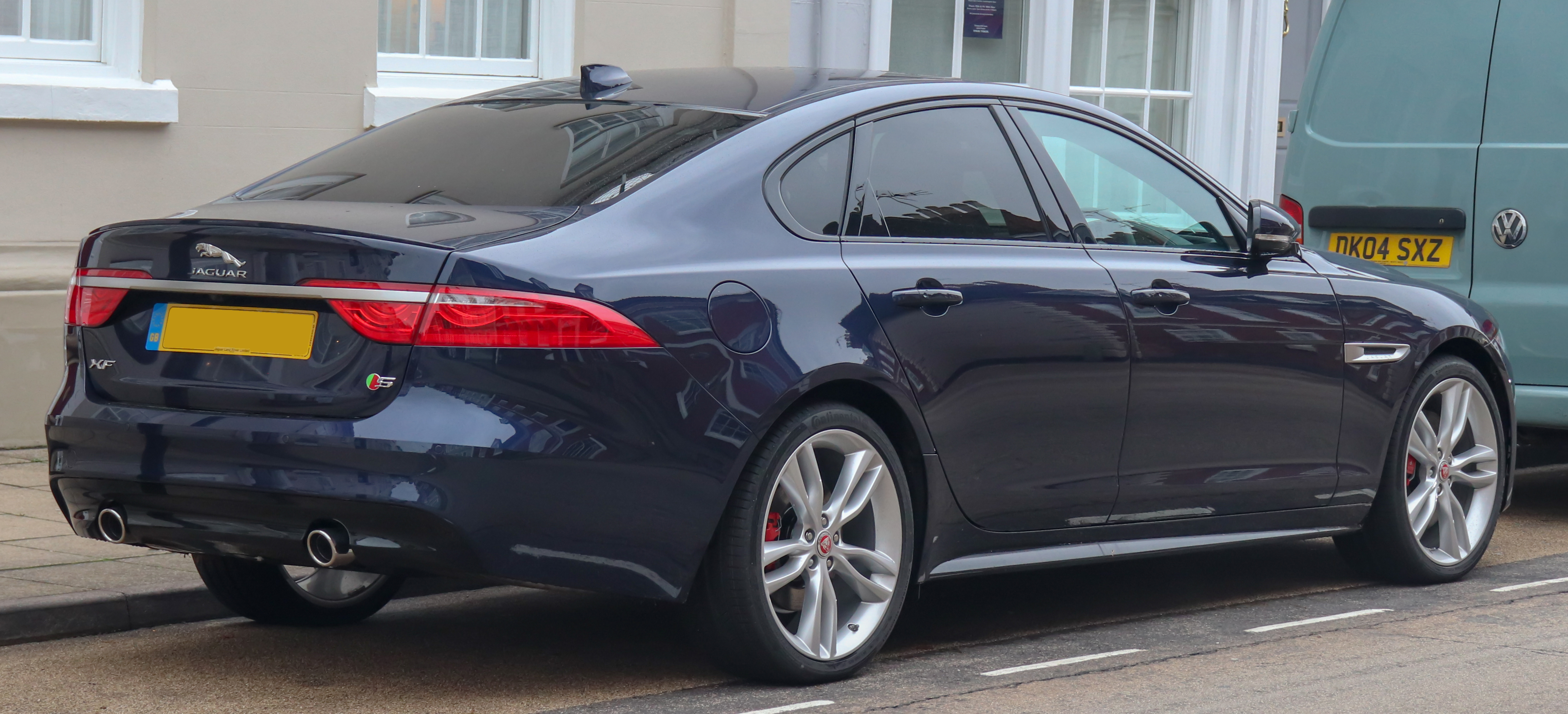
XF S diesel saloon (UK)

== F-Type Project 7 ==
Although not carrying SV in its name - unlike the later SV Project 8 - this limited edition speedster variant of the F-Type was developed for production by SVO. It began life as a skunkworks design penned by Italian-Brazilian designer César Pieri. It was discovered by chance when Pieri accidentally showed it to Jaguar then chief designer Ian Callum. The concept then became a functional prototype and eventually reached production.

Powered by the same 5.0-litre supercharged V8 engine as the F-Type SVR, both sharing a maximum power output of 575 hp (429 kW), it was the joint most powerful Jaguar ever at the time.

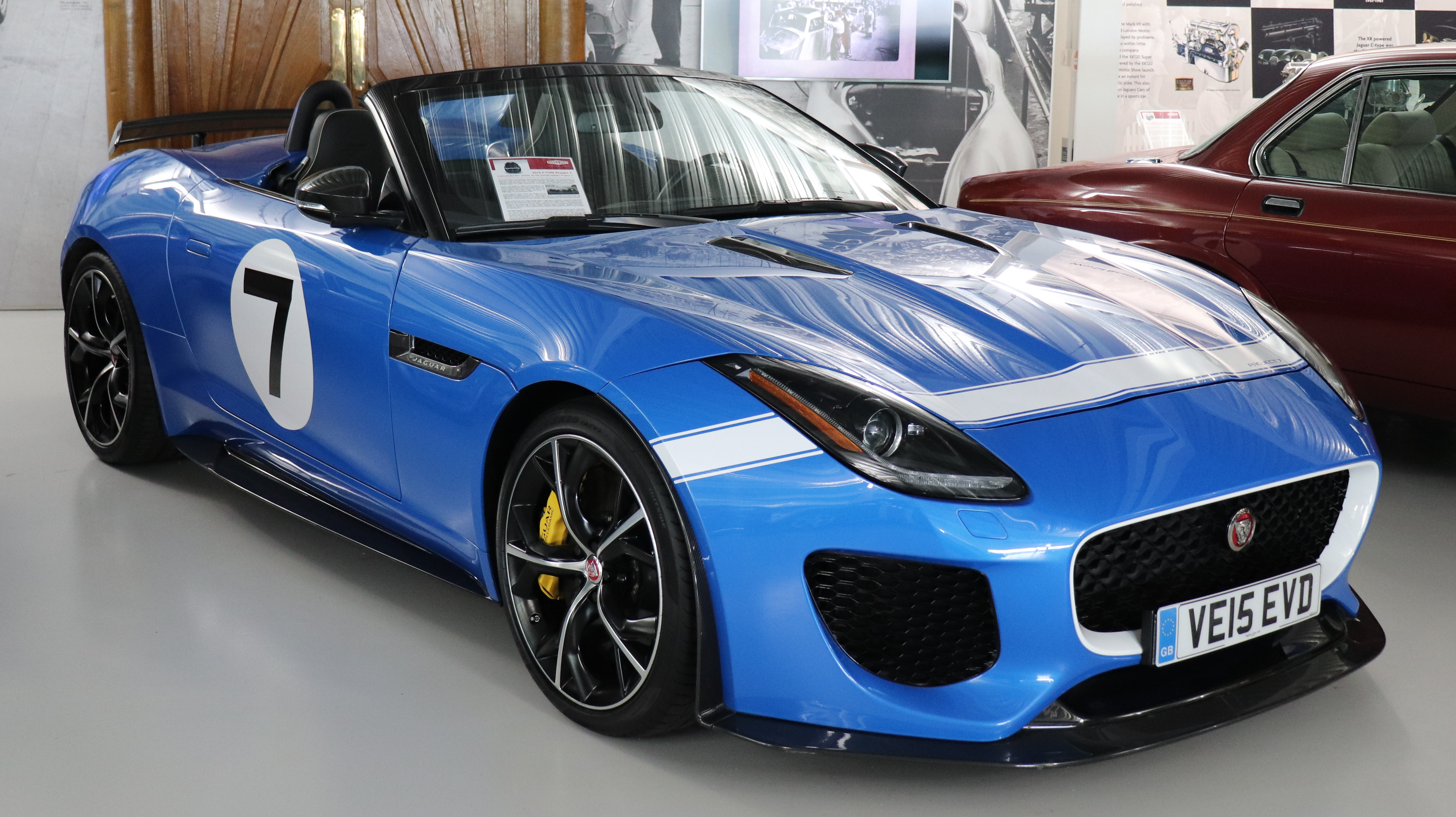
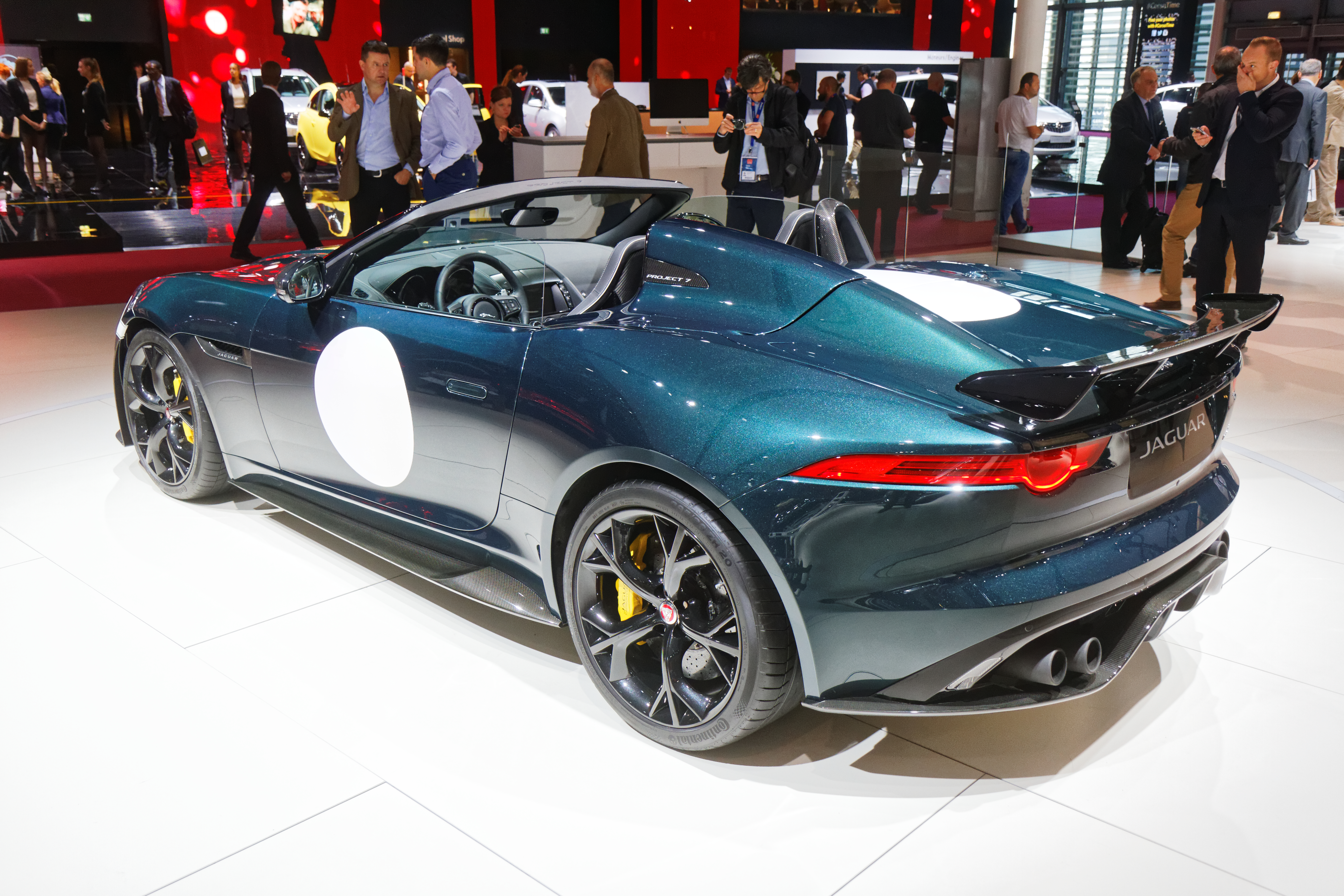

== Competition ==
BMW's M models, Audi's RS models, Mercedes-Benz's AMG models are often reviewed in direct competition to a similarly-positioned R, R-S or SVR car, as well as models from other manufacturers such as Porsche and Maserati - also being comparable to Alfa Romeo's Quadrifoglio and Lexus' F model ranges.

S models compare closely with BMW's M Sport range, Audi's S models, Mercedes-Benz's lower AMG models in addition to sporting versions of many cars by a variety of makes.
