= Jaguar C-X75 =

British concept car

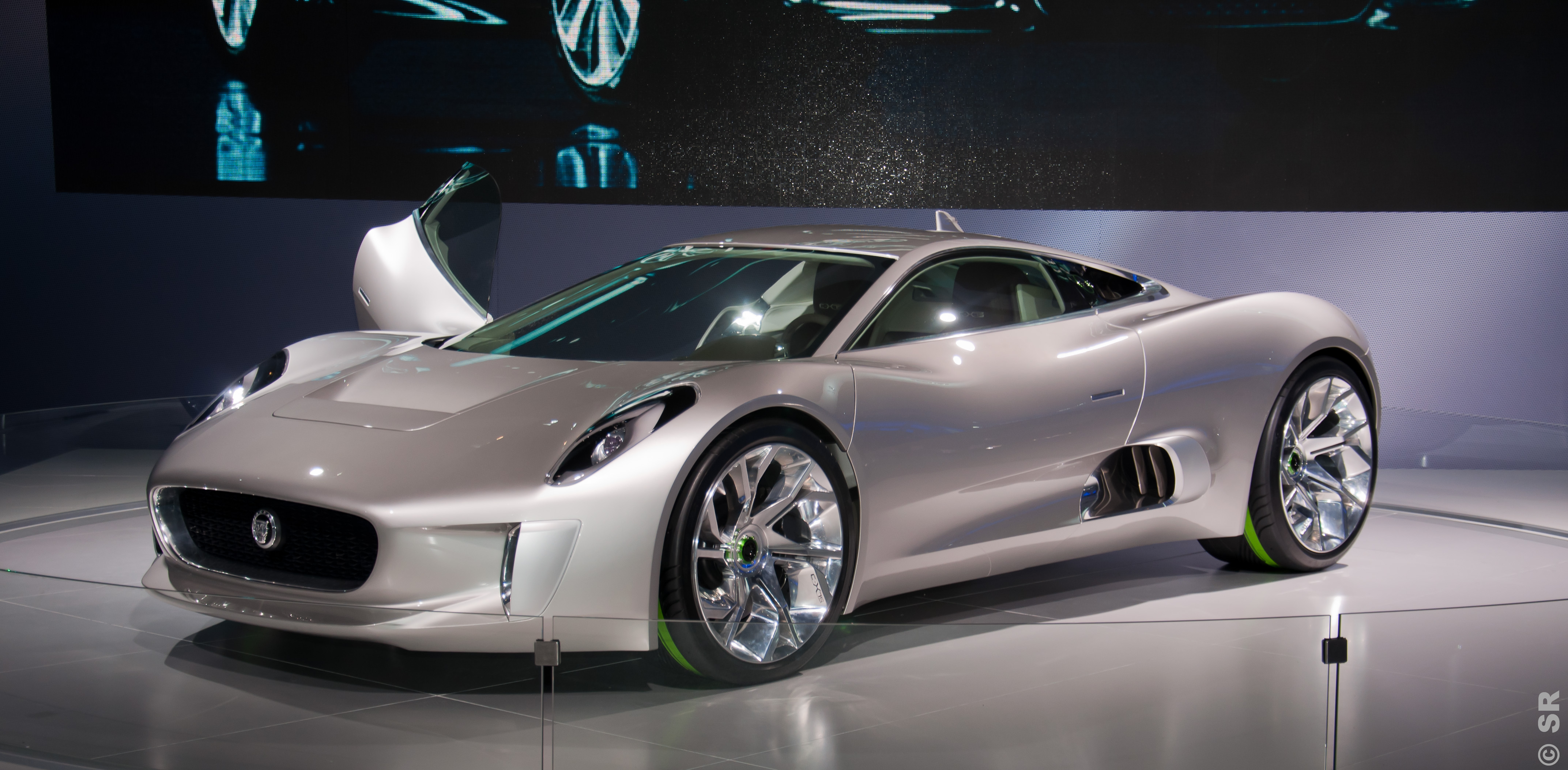

Overview
- Manufacturer: Jaguar Cars
- Production: 2010–2013
- Designer: Ian Callum

Body and chassis
- Class: Sports car (S)
- Body style: 2-door coupé
- Layout: Rear mid-engine, all-wheel drive
- Doors: Swan (concept); Butterfly (prototypes)

Powertrain
- Engine: Concept: 2 diesel micro gas turbines; Developmental prototypes: 1.6 L (98 cu in) twincharged I4
- Electric motor: Concept: 4 YASA electric motors; Developmental prototypes: 2 YASA electric motors
- Power output: Concept: 778 hp (789 PS; 580 kW); Developmental prototypes: 500 hp (507 PS; 373 kW) (engine); 390 hp (395 PS; 291 kW) (electric motors); 850 hp (860 PS; 630 kW) (combined)
- Transmission: Concept: Direct drive; Developmental prototypes: 7-speed automated manual
- Hybrid drivetrain: Concept: Series Hybrid; Developmental prototypes: Plug-in Parallel Hybrid (PHEV)
- Battery: 19 kWh liquid-cooled lithium-ion battery
- Range: Concept: 110 km (68 miles); Developmental prototypes: 60 km (37 miles)

Dimensions
- Wheelbase: 2,725 mm (107 in)
- Length: 4,646 mm (183 in)
- Width: 2,040 mm (80 in)
- Height: 1,160 mm (46 in)
- Kerb weight: 1,700 kg (3,748 lb)

Chronology
- Predecessor: Jaguar XJ220 (spiritual)

The Jaguar C-X75 is a hybrid-electric, 2-seat, concept car produced by British automobile manufacturer Jaguar Cars in partnership with the derivative of the Formula One team, Williams Advanced Engineering, which debuted at the 2010 Paris Motor Show. The powertrain of the C-X75 concept is rated at 778 hp (789 PS; 580 kW) through four YASA electric motors, each of which drives one of the four wheels. The batteries driving these motors are recharged using two diesel-fed micro gas turbines instead of a conventional four-stroke engine. It was described as a design study that would influence future design and technology.

In May 2011 Jaguar announced a limited production of the C-X75 from 2013 to 2015, with a compact, forced induction petrol engine combined with electric motors instead of the micro gas turbines in the concept car. A maximum of 250 cars were planned to be built in partnership with Williams Advanced Engineering. The production version was expected to have an all-electric range of 50 km (31 miles). In December 2012, the company announced the cancellation of production due to the Great Recession. Five developmental prototypes were produced in the production car specifications in 2013. The car was featured in the 2015 film Spectre, the twenty-fourth James Bond film in which seven cars were supplied to the filmmakers.

== Engine and performance ==
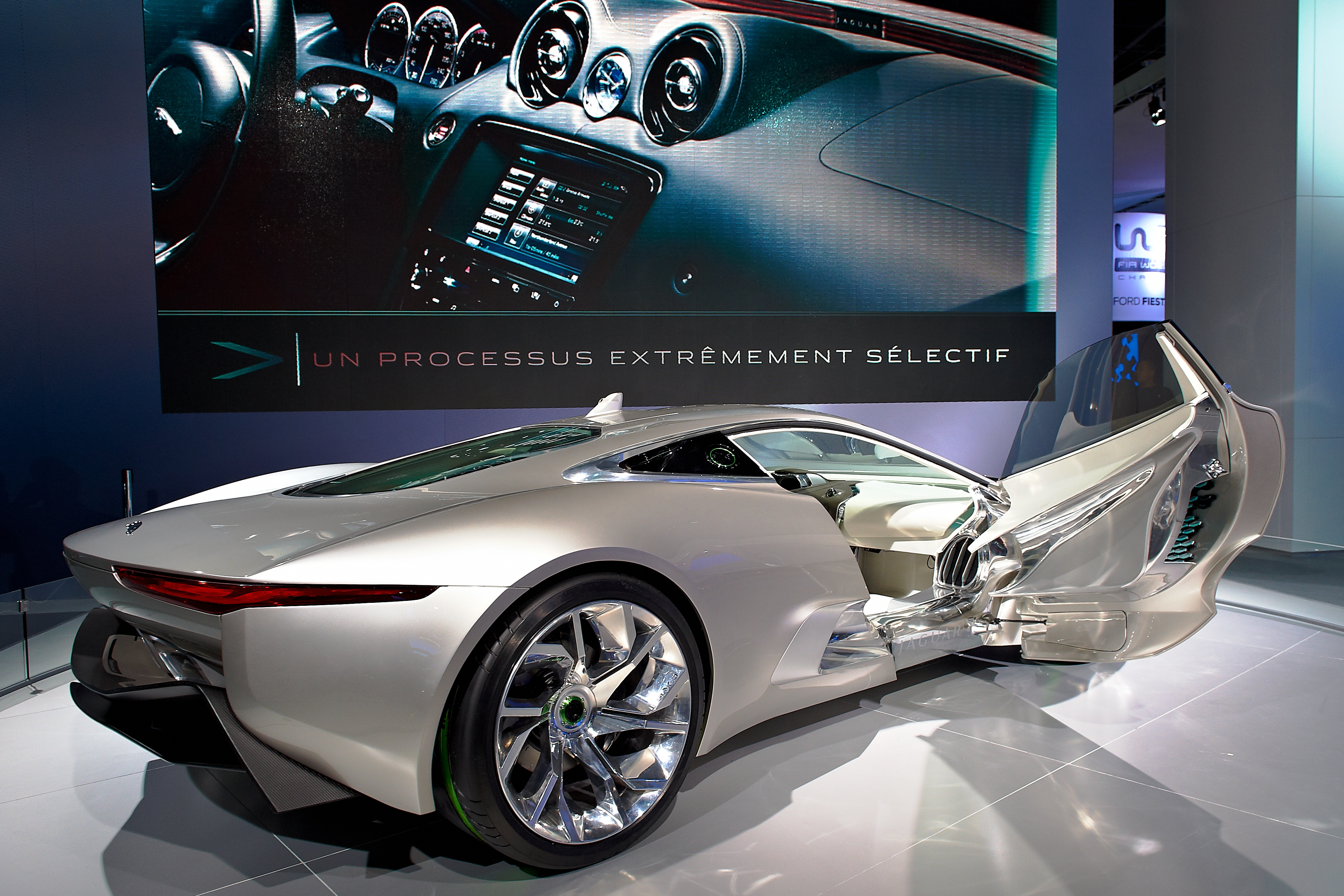
Jaguar C-X75 concept rear view (doors open)

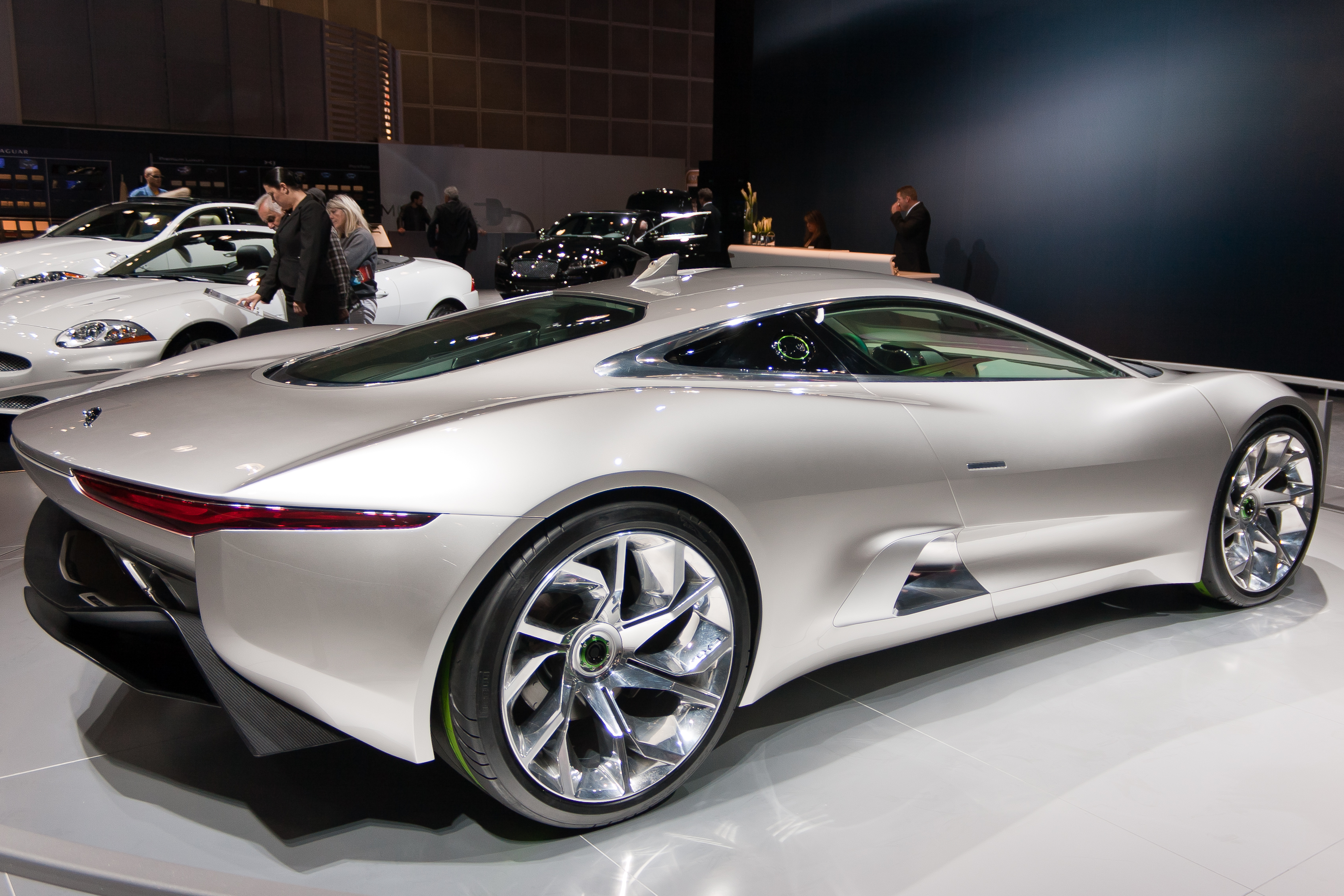
Jaguar C-X75 concept rear view (doors closed)

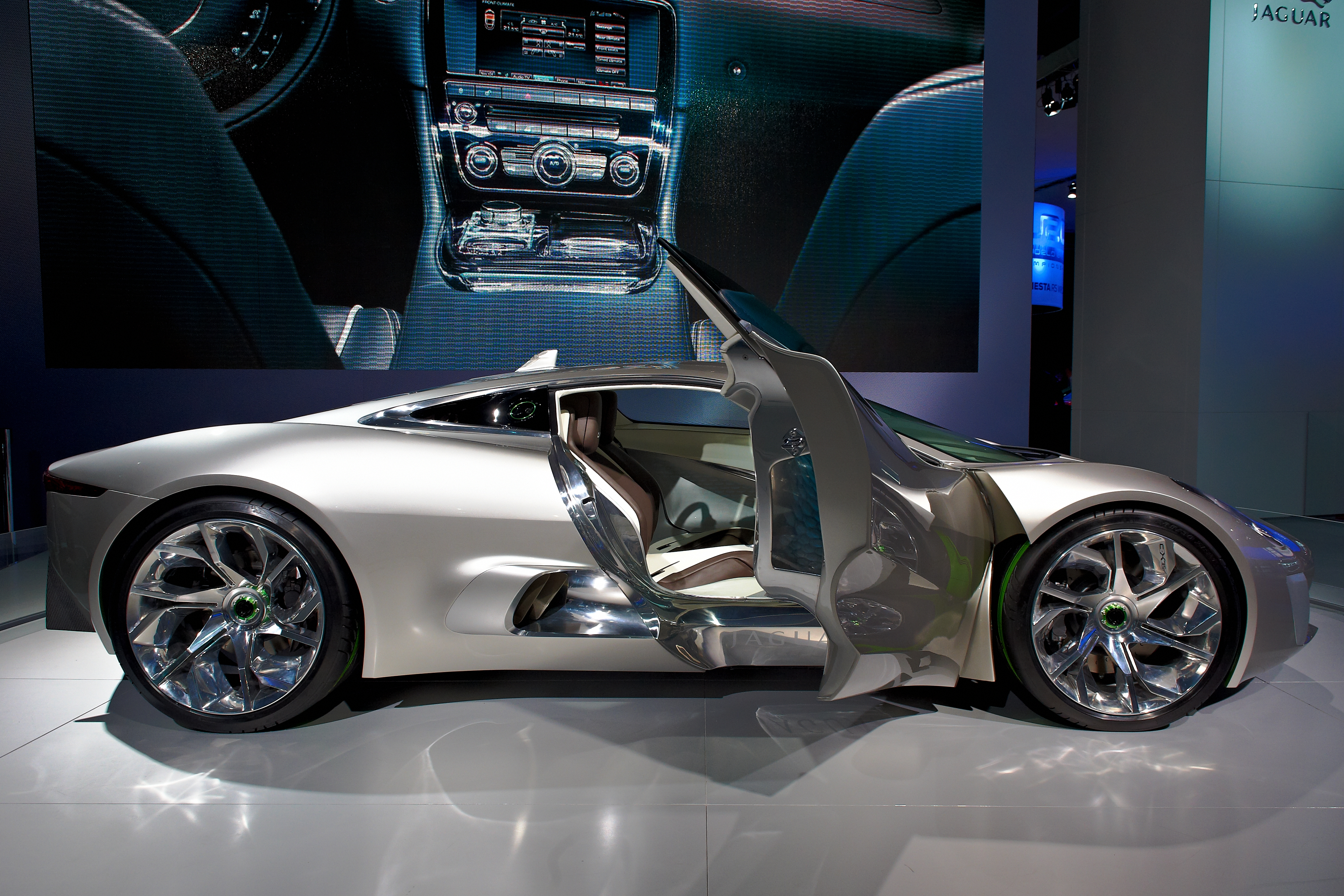
Jaguar C-X75 concept side view

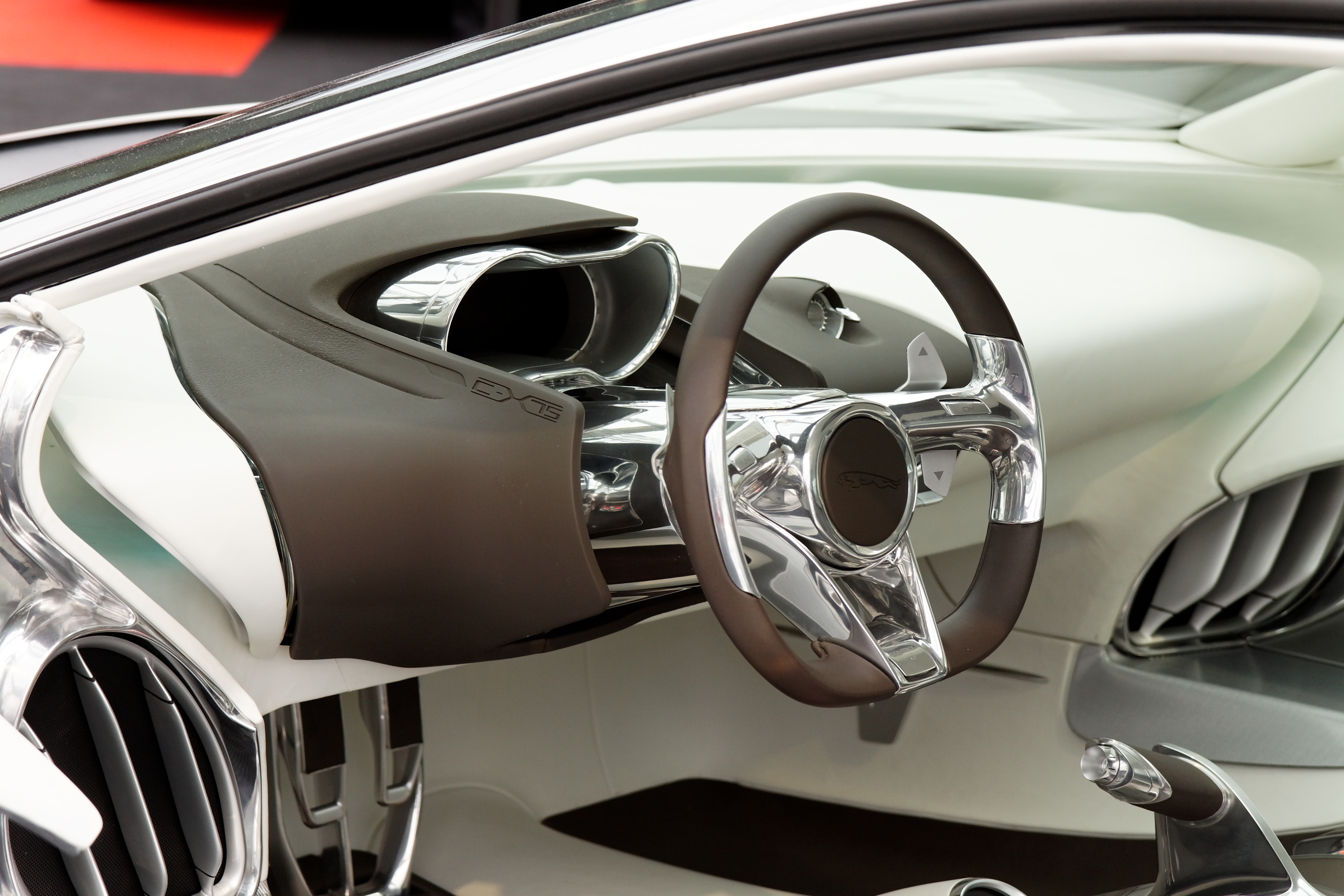
Jaguar C-X75 concept interior

In terms of performance, Jaguar envisioned a goal of their future sports car reaching 330 km/h (205 mph) and accelerating from 0 to 100 km/h (0 to 62 mph) in 2.9 seconds and 80 to 145 km/h (50 to 90 mph) in 2.3 seconds. It is powered by four 145 kW (194 hp) electric motors – one for each wheel – which have a total of 780 hp (582 kW) and a total torque output of 1,600 N⋅m (1,180 lbf⋅ft). Inherent in the drivetrain is the ability to independently drive each wheel across the full speed range, known as Torque Vectoring. Each motor weighs 50 kg (110 lb).

The micro gas turbines from Bladon Jets generate enough electricity to extend the range of the car to 900 km (559 miles) while producing 28 grams of CO_{2} per kilometre on the EU test cycle. While running solely on battery power, the C-X75 has an all-electric range of 110 km (68 miles). Among other advantages, the micro turbines used in the C-X75 can be run on a range of fuels including diesel, biofuels, compressed natural gas and liquid petroleum gas. The 15 kWh lithium-ion battery pack weighs 185 kg (408 lb). Jaguar estimated an average carbon emission of 28 g/km on European test cycle, however, the carbon emission is around 150 g/km if the turbines are running.

Jaguar also focused on the aerodynamics in order to improve performance. For example, the carbon-fibre rear diffuser that guides airflow from under the car creates down-force, and includes an active aerofoil that is lowered automatically as speed increases, creating over 200 kg (440 lb) of downforce at 321 km/h (199 mph). Moreover, the C-X75 features an extruded and bonded, aerospace-inspired, aluminium chassis, saving weight and improving sustainability and performance.

== Production ==
In May 2011 Jaguar unveiled plans to produce the C-X75; the company had planned to produce a maximum of 250 cars in partnership with Williams Advanced Engineering. The decision was part of a £5 billion investment plan, announced by Jaguar Land Rover (JLR) in March 2011 at the Geneva Motor Show, to launch 40 "significant new products" over the next five years. The model was scheduled to be built from 2013 until 2015, although it had not yet been decided where the production would take place.

The C-X75 was to be built without the micro-turbines, instead, the production version would use a downsized, forced induction petrol engine, with one electric motor at each axle. In order to create a lightweight strong structure, the chassis was planned to be made of carbon-fibre, and the engine was to be mid-mounted for optimum weight distribution and to retain the concept's silhouette. The C-X75 production version was expected to deliver CO_{2} emissions of less than 99 g/km, a sub-three second 0–60 mph acceleration time, a top speed in excess of 320 km/h (200 mph) and a reduced all-electric range of 50 km (31 miles) as compared to the 110 km (68 miles) for the concept car.

== Cancellation ==
In December 2012, Jaguar's Global Brand Director announced the cancellation of production due to the Great Recession, as the carmaker considered that "it seems the wrong time to launch an £800,000 to £1 million supercar". The company expected to take advantage of part of the investment in the C-X75 development by using the C-X75 technology in future Jaguar cars. The Jaguar F-Type and the Jaguar I-Pace were heavily influenced from the C-X75 and carried over many design cues and technological features from it. Jaguar announced its decision to continue working on five prototypes to be developed until May 2013. These prototypes featured a 1.6-litre turbocharged and supercharged inline-4 engine coupled with two YASA electric motors placed on each axle of the car. The powertrain had a combined power output of 850 hp (862 PS; 634 kW), with the combustion engine alone generating 502 hp (509 PS; 374 kW) at 10,000 rpm, and helped the car achieve speeds up to 200 mph (322 km/h) in testing, with a theoretical maximum of 220 mph (354 km/h). Up to three of these prototypes were then sold at auction, while one went to a future Jaguar museum, and one was kept by Jaguar for running demonstrations. One of these prototypes was also featured in the 2015 James Bond film, Spectre.

== Appearance in Spectre ==
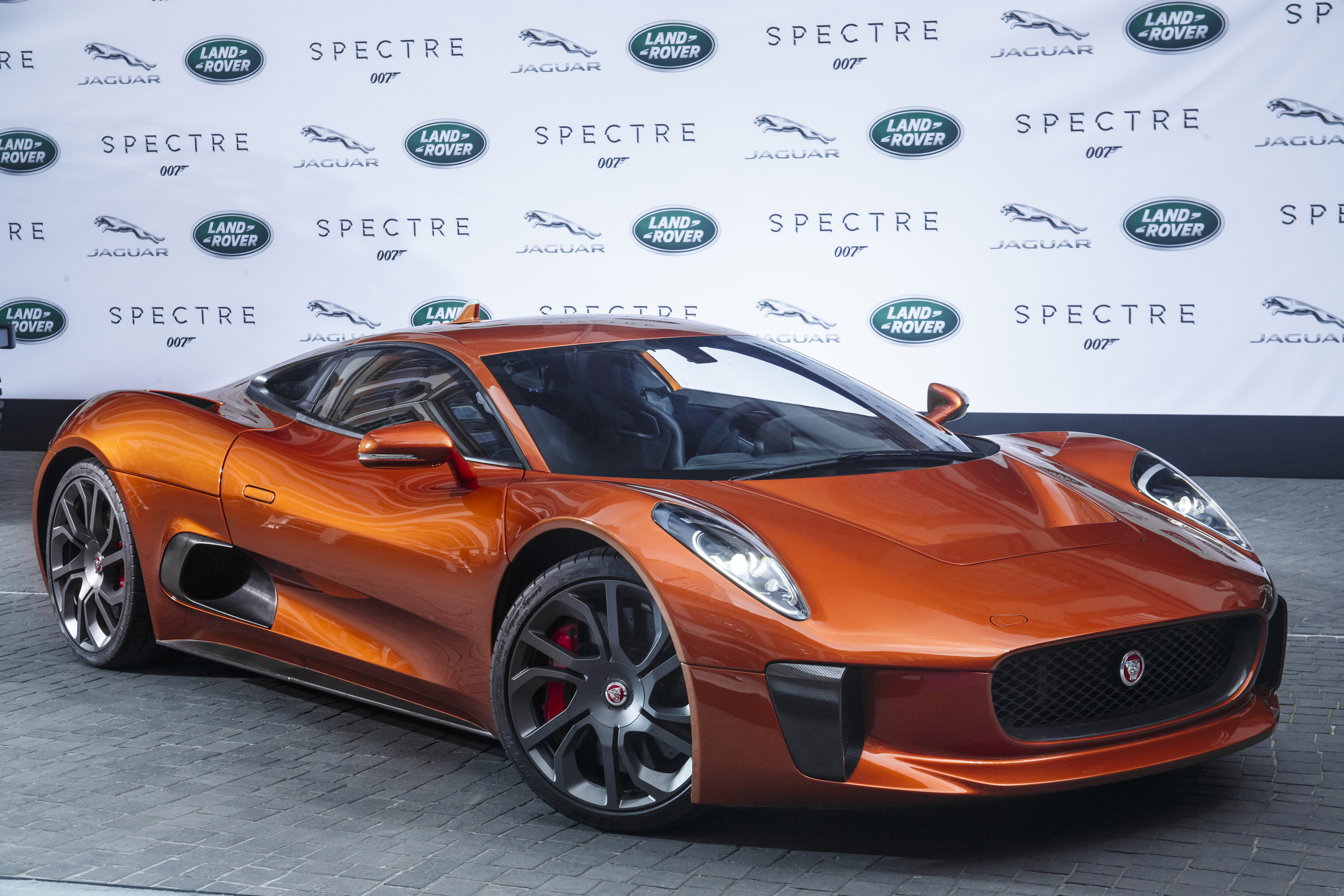
One of the seven C-X75s used in filming Spectre

A Jaguar C-X75 (painted in dark orange) appears in the 2015 James Bond film Spectre as Mr. Hinx's car (licensed ROMA 860K). It takes part in a car chase around Rome against James Bond, who drives an Aston Martin DB10. Jaguar supplied seven examples to the filmmakers. Although the cars are visually faithful to the original C-X75 concept, they are mechanically unrelated. According to JLR Special Vehicle Operations chief John Edwards, the cars are "constructed around a spaceframe built to World Rally Championship spec" and powered by a dry sump V8 engine. Although this new appearance of the C-X75 led to speculation that production plans for the car were being revived, Edwards was quoted as saying "The film was an opportunity to showcase C-X75, but it doesn't mean a change in strategy." The car was built in collaboration with Williams Advanced Engineering.

== Confusion of how many C-X75 exist ==
There is confusion of how many C-X75 exist. WAE (who worked on the cars) say on their website that six stunt cars were commissioned and seven cars were produced. However an official photo taken by Jaguar shows only 6 cars to exist. Kaaimans International (who are selling one of the cars), says only 4 stunt cars had been produced. Furthermore, this is an agreed upon number by the car's designer, Ian Callum, in a two part article where he states four were built specifically for the film. However, in the book Bond Cars: The Definitive History it says there are 7 cars but doesn't distinguish between V8-powered stunt cars and the engineering prototypes. Octane also agrees on 7 cars along with a Top Gear magazine article that states "They built seven. Two are ‘star cars’, cosmetically perfect specimens with proper glitzy interiors; the other five are grafters, used for skidding about and doing the fun stuff".

== See also ==
- Jaguar C-X16 – Jaguar's smaller 2011 hybrid 2-seat sports car concept
- List of modern production plug-in electric vehicles
