= Jaguar C-X16 =

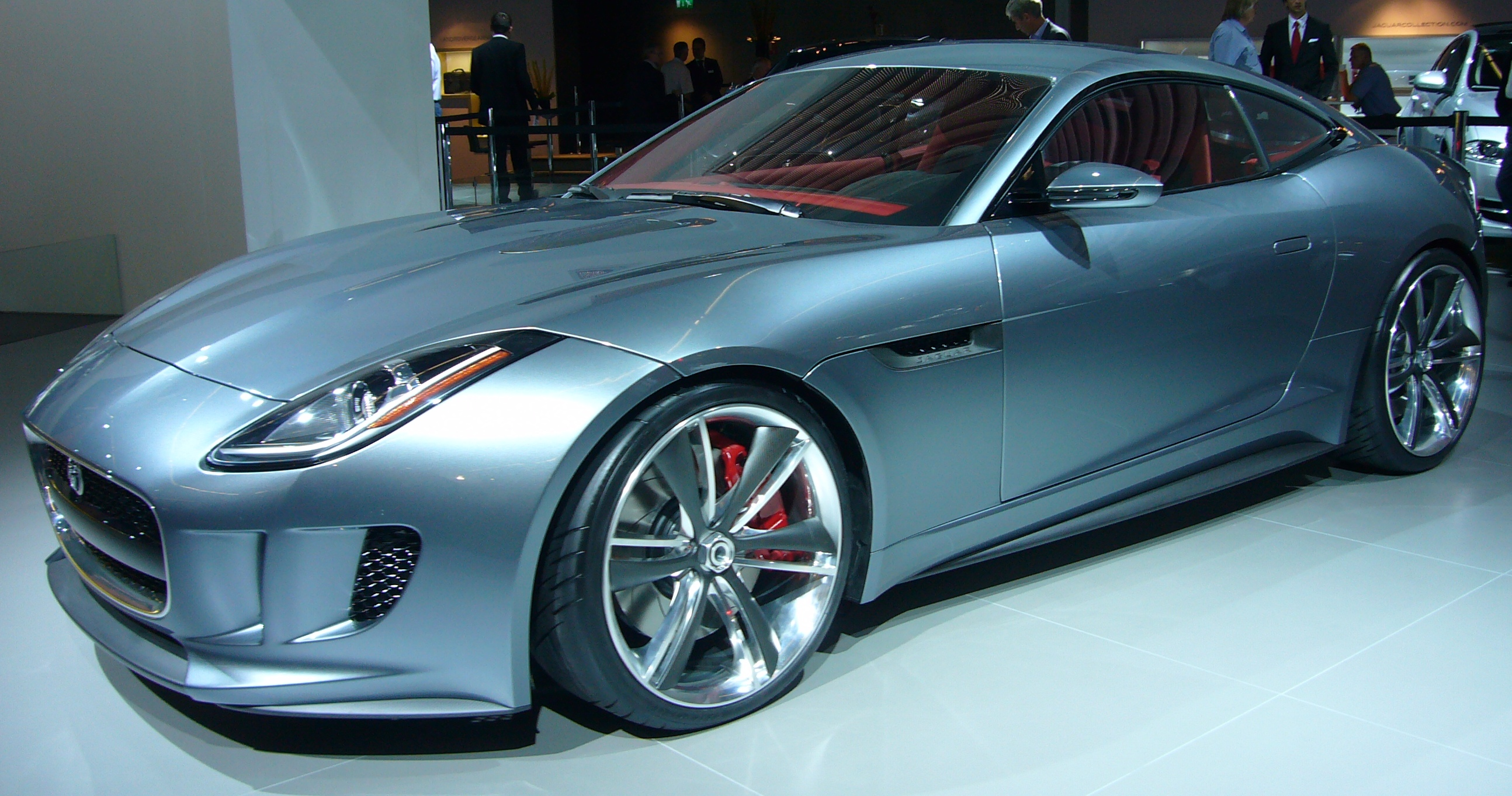

Overview
- Manufacturer: Jaguar Cars
- Production: 2011 (concept car)
- Designer: Ian Callum

Body and chassis
- Class: Sports car (S)
- Body style: 2-doors Coupe
- Layout: Front-engine, rear-wheel-drive
- Related: Jaguar F-Type

Powertrain
- Engine: 3-litre supercharged Jaguar AJ126 V6 petrol engine (375 bhp (280 kW) 332 lb⋅ft (450 N⋅m))
- Electric motor: (92 bhp (69 kW) 173 lb⋅ft (235 N⋅m)) Permanent Magnet (PMAC) Motor
- Transmission: 8-speed ZF automatic
- Hybrid drivetrain: Parallel Hybrid
- Battery: 1.6 kWh lithium-ion battery pack

Dimensions
- Length: 4,445 mm (175.0 in)
- Width: 2,048 mm (80.6 in)
- Height: 1,297 mm (51.1 in)
- Kerb weight: 1,600 kg (3,527 lb)

Chronology
- Successor: Jaguar F-Type

The Jaguar C-X16 is a concept hybrid electric sports car that was unveiled by Jaguar Cars at the 2011 Frankfurt Motor Show on 13 September. In April 2012, Jaguar announced that they will be manufacturing a new sports car based on the Jaguar C-X16 called the F-Type, which was subsequently shown to the public (in non-hybrid form) at the Paris Motor Show in September 2012.

== Design ==
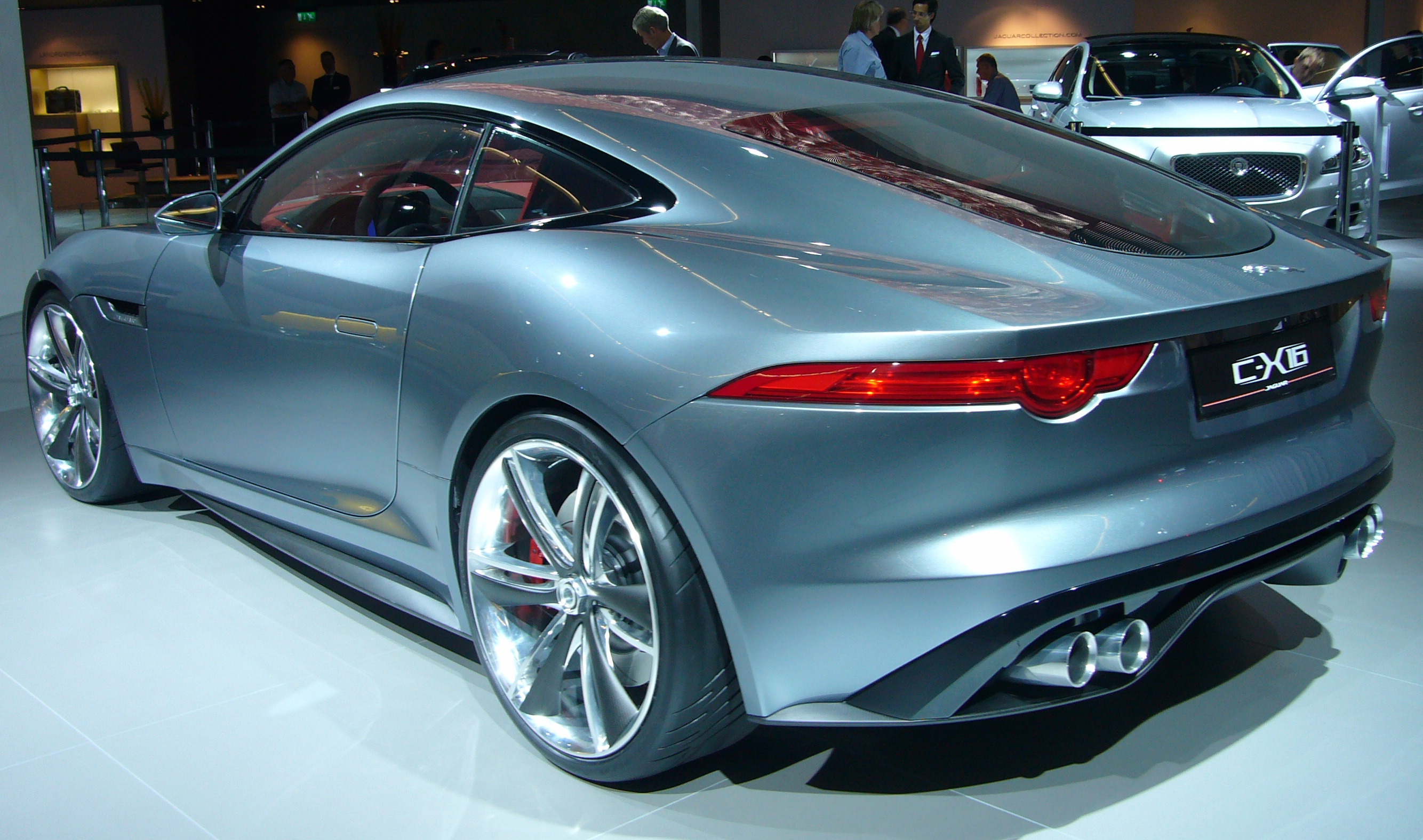
Rear view

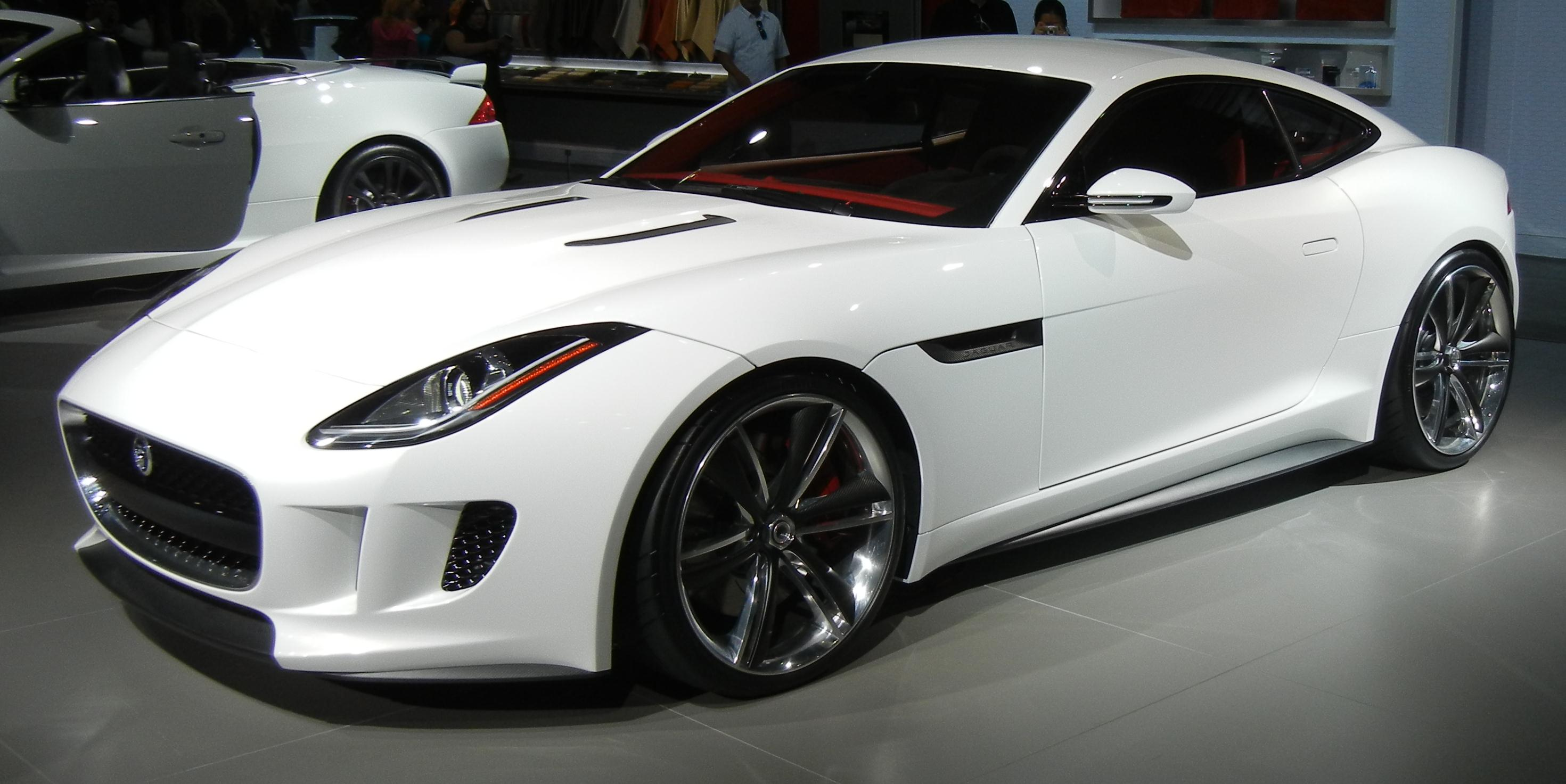
Jaguar C-X16 at the 2011 LA Auto Show

The car body is constructed from aluminium, and is said by Jaguar to be the smallest car that they have made since the XK120 of 1954. The drivetrain comprises a hybrid unit, combining a 375 bhp (280 kW; 380 PS) 332 lb⋅ft (450 N⋅m) supercharged 3-litre V6 petrol engine with a 92 bhp (69 kW; 93 PS) 173 lb⋅ft (235 N⋅m) electric motor and an eight-speed ZF automatic transmission. The battery pack, which is mounted behind the front seats, is charged using a brake regeneration system. The car can run on engine alone, motor alone or on both in combination. Under engine power, the electric motor can also be activated to boost acceleration, in a similar way to the KERS system used in Formula 1 cars, by using a switch on the steering wheel.

== Styling ==
The C-X16 form takes cues from Jaguar's 2010 C-X75 plug-in hybrid concept supercar, including the shape of the front grille and the wrap-around rear lights, and has a side-hinged opening rear window reminiscent of the 1961 E-Type.

== Performance ==
Jaguar's figures give a 0 - 62 mph (100 km/h) acceleration time of 4.4 seconds and a top speed limited to 186 mph (300 km/h). The CO_{2} rating is 165 g/km. Powered by the electric motor alone, the top speed is 50 mph (80 km/h).
