= Jaguar F-Type =

Sports car

Jaguar F-Type (X152)
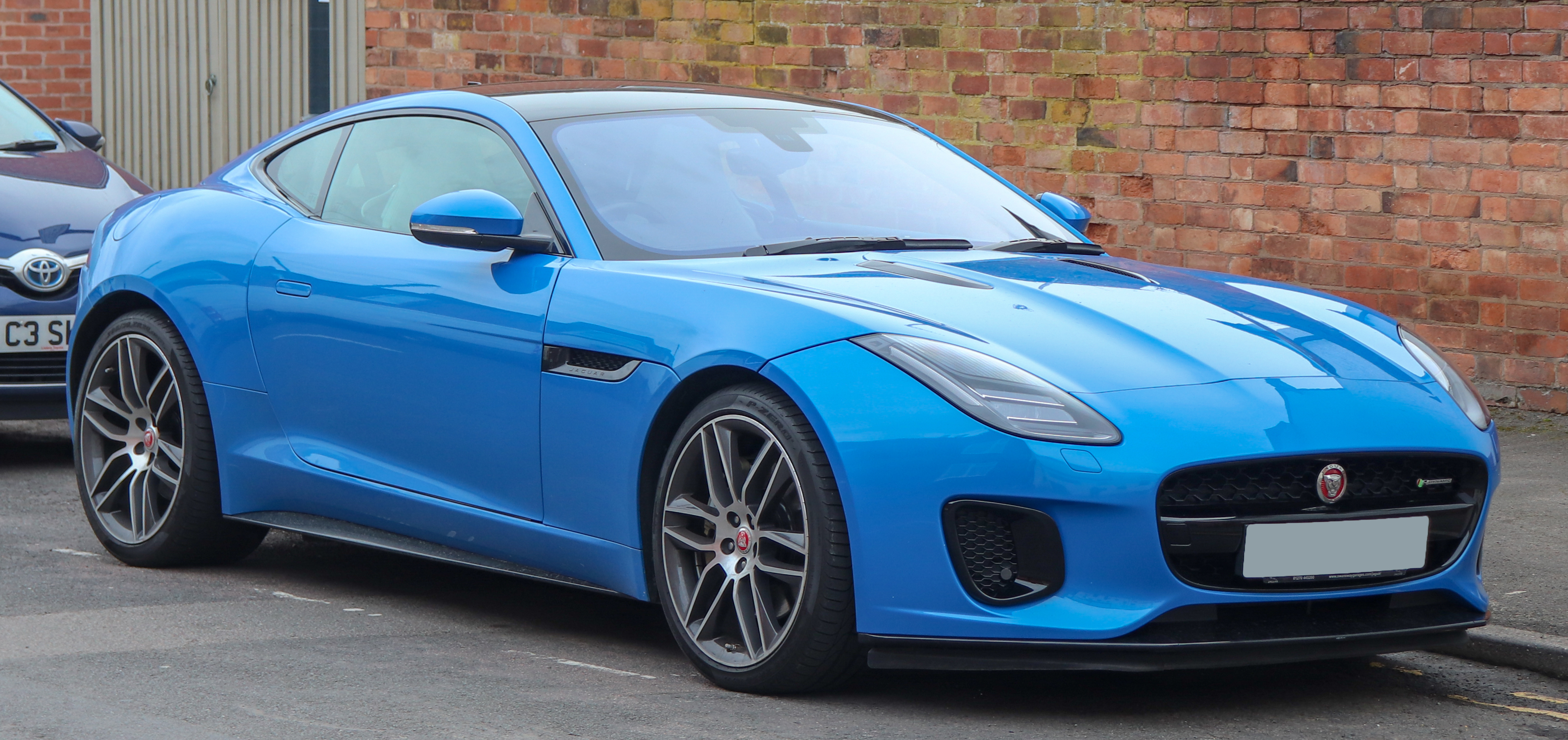
- Jaguar F-Type R-Dynamic coupé

Overview
- Manufacturer: Jaguar Land Rover
- Model code: X152
- Also called: Lister LFT
- Production: December 2012 – June 2024
- Model years: 2013–2025
- Assembly: United Kingdom: Birmingham (Castle Bromwich Assembly)
- Designer: Ian Callum; César Pieri (Project 7)

Body and chassis
- Class: Sports car (S)
- Body style: 2-door roadster; 2-door fastback coupé
- Layout: Front-engine, rear-wheel-drive / all-wheel-drive
- Platform: JLR D6a
- Related: Jaguar C-X16

Powertrain
- Engine: 2.0 L Ingenium turbocharged I4; 3.0 L supercharged Jaguar AJ126 V6; 5.0 L supercharged Jaguar AJ133 V8
- Power output: 300 PS (221 kW) (F-Type I4); 340 PS (250 kW) (F-Type V6); 380 PS (279 kW) (F-Type S / F-Type P380); 400 PS (294 kW) (F-Type 400 Sport); 450 PS (331 kW) (F-Type P450); 495 PS (364 kW) (F-Type V8 S); 550 PS (405 kW) (F-Type R); 575 PS (423 kW) (F-Type SVR / Project 7 / F-Type R P575)
- Transmission: 6-speed ZF S6-45 manual; 8-speed ZF 8HP automatic

Dimensions
- Wheelbase: 2,622 mm (103.2 in)
- Length: 4,470 mm (176 in)
- Width: 1,923 mm (75.7 in)
- Height: 1,308 mm (51.5 in)
- Kerb weight: 1,597–1,665 kg (3,521–3,671 lb)

Chronology
- Predecessor: Jaguar XK

The Jaguar F-Type (X152) is a series of two-door, two-seater sports cars manufactured by British car manufacturer Jaguar Land Rover under their Jaguar Cars marque from December 2012 to June 2024 at Jaguar's Castle Bromwich assembly plant in the UK. The car's JLR D6a platform is based on a shortened version of the XK's platform. It is the so-called "spiritual successor" to the E-Type.

The car was launched initially as a 2-door soft-top convertible, with a 2-door fastback coupé version launched in 2013. The F-Type underwent a facelift for the 2021 model year. It was unveiled in December 2019, featuring a significantly restyled front end and dashboard, and simplified drivetrain options. Jaguar discontinued the F-Type after the 2024 model year. Production ended in June 2024, by which time 87,731 examples had been built.

== F-Type concept (2000) ==
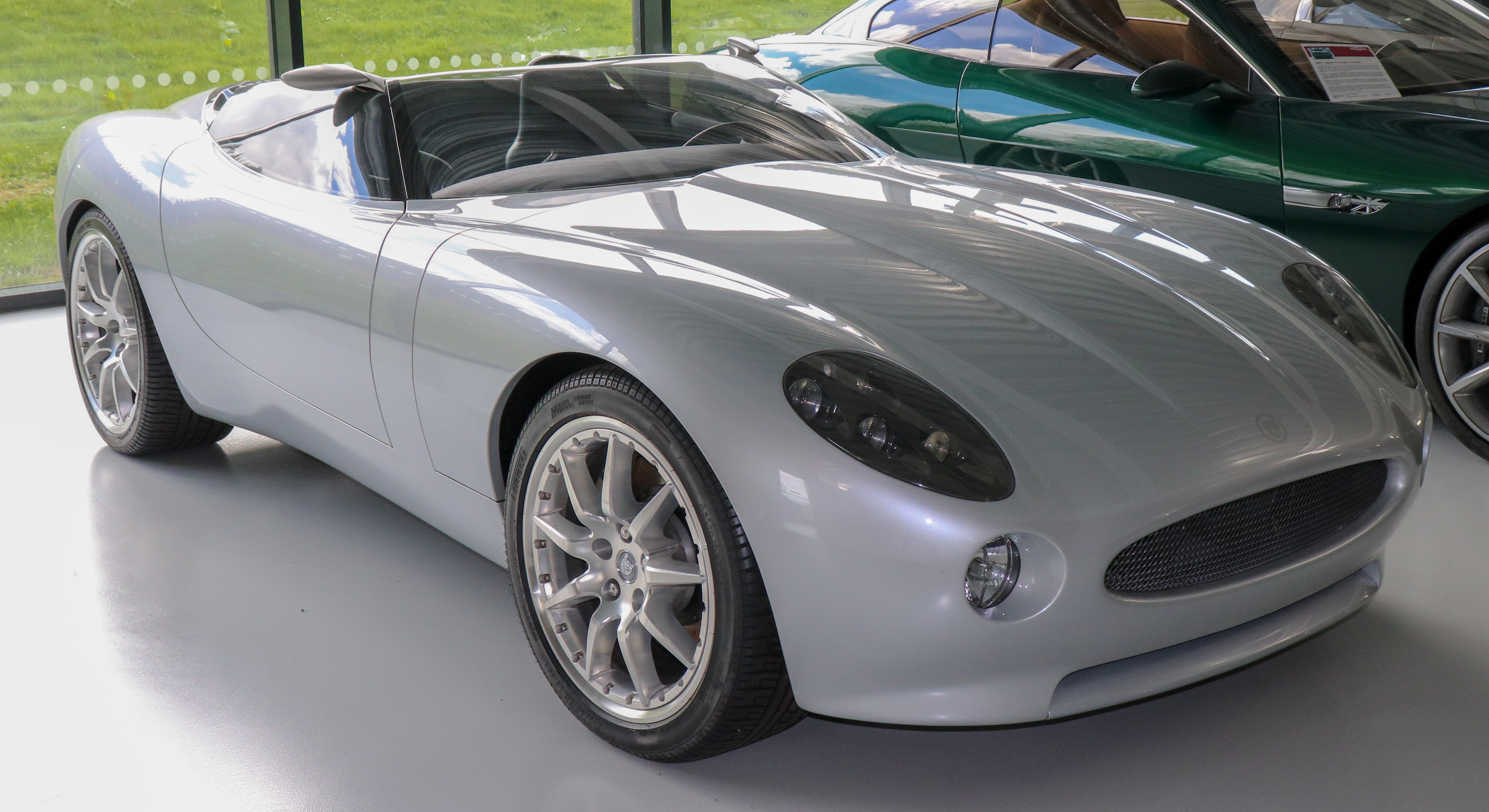
2000 Jaguar F-Type concept displayed in the British Motor Museum, Gaydon

The first F-type project at Jaguar was the XJ41/XJ42, begun in 1980 to produce a new sports car, inspired by the E-type, but with a modern interpretation. "The project was canned in March 1990, after management decided the project was ready to slip further back (into the 1995 model year), and this would put it into direct conflict with the upcoming X300 Project (at the time, known as XJ90)." The new F-Type in concept in 2000 was a two-seat speedster with a 3.0-litre V6 engine from the S-Type saloon conceived to compete against light weight sports cars, such as the Porsche Boxster. Geoff Lawson, Jaguar's Head of Design, had been working on the development of the car, leading a team of three designers namely Keith Helfet, Adam Hatton and Pasi Pennanen. His sudden death in 1999 led Ian Callum, the new Head of Design, to continue the project who would present the finalised concept car to the general public at the 2000 Detroit Auto Show to a positive response due to its retro styling which recalled Jaguar automobiles of the 1950s and 60s. At its introduction, the car was quoted to be available with a manual or automatic transmission and an optional all-wheel-drive system. Budget cuts by parent company Ford led Jaguar to pursue its efforts in Formula-One and by 2002, the F-Type project was cancelled due to its failure to meet production feasibility.

== C-X16 concept (2011) ==
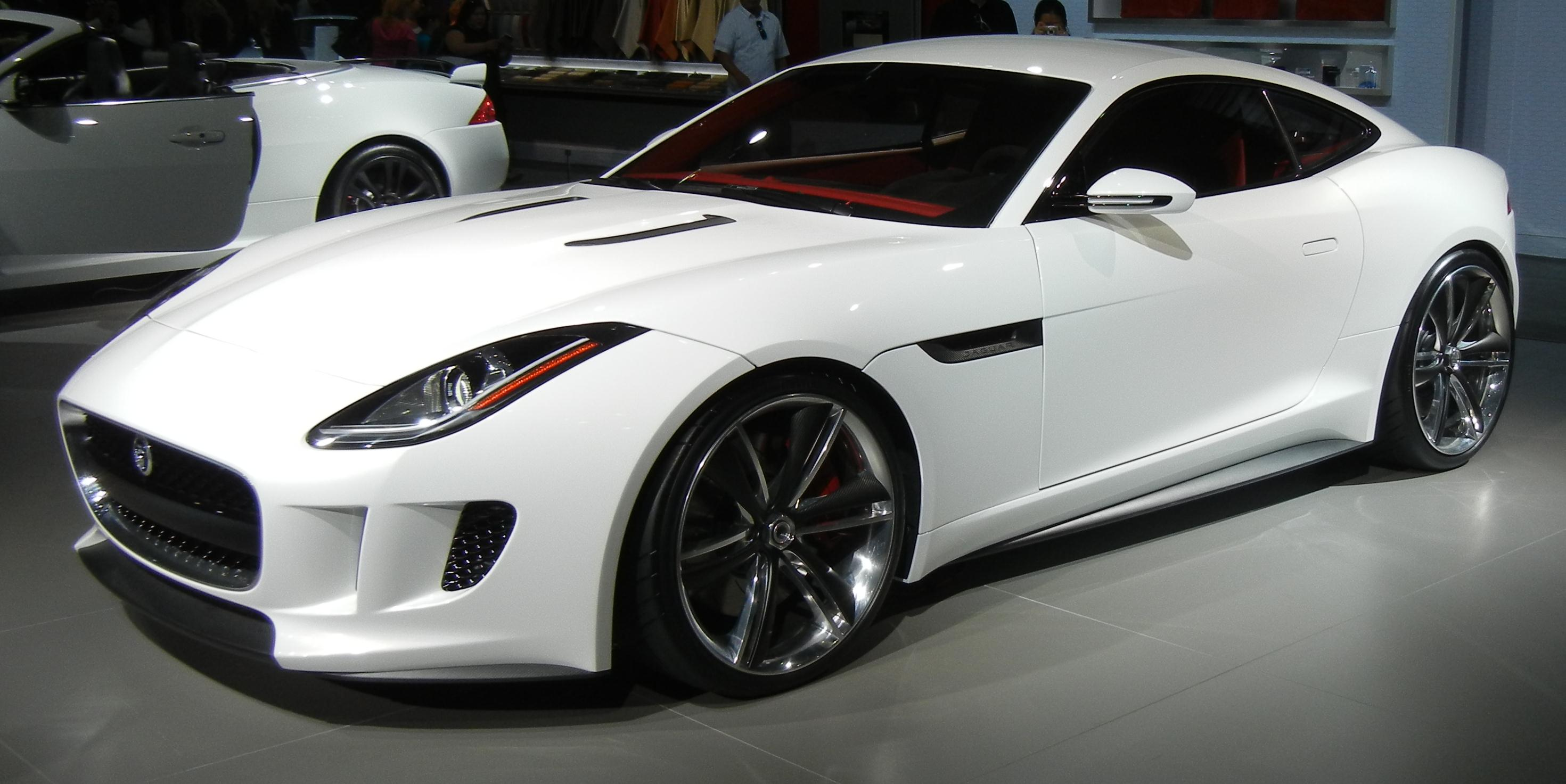
Jaguar C-X16

The C-X16 concept takes cues from the 2010 C-X75 plug-in hybrid concept sports car, including the shape of the front grille and the wrap-around rear lights, along with a side-hinged opening rear window reminiscent of the 1961 E-Type fastback coupé.

The concept car was unveiled at the 2011 Frankfurt Motor Show. Jaguar stated that the C-X16 was their smallest car since the 1954 Jaguar XK120, at: 4,445 mm (175.0 in) length; 2,048 mm (80.6 in) width; 1,297 mm (51.1 in) height.

The F-Type which was previewed stylistically by the C-X16, was developed under the project code "X152".

== Production variants ==
=== F-Type Convertible (2013–2023) ===
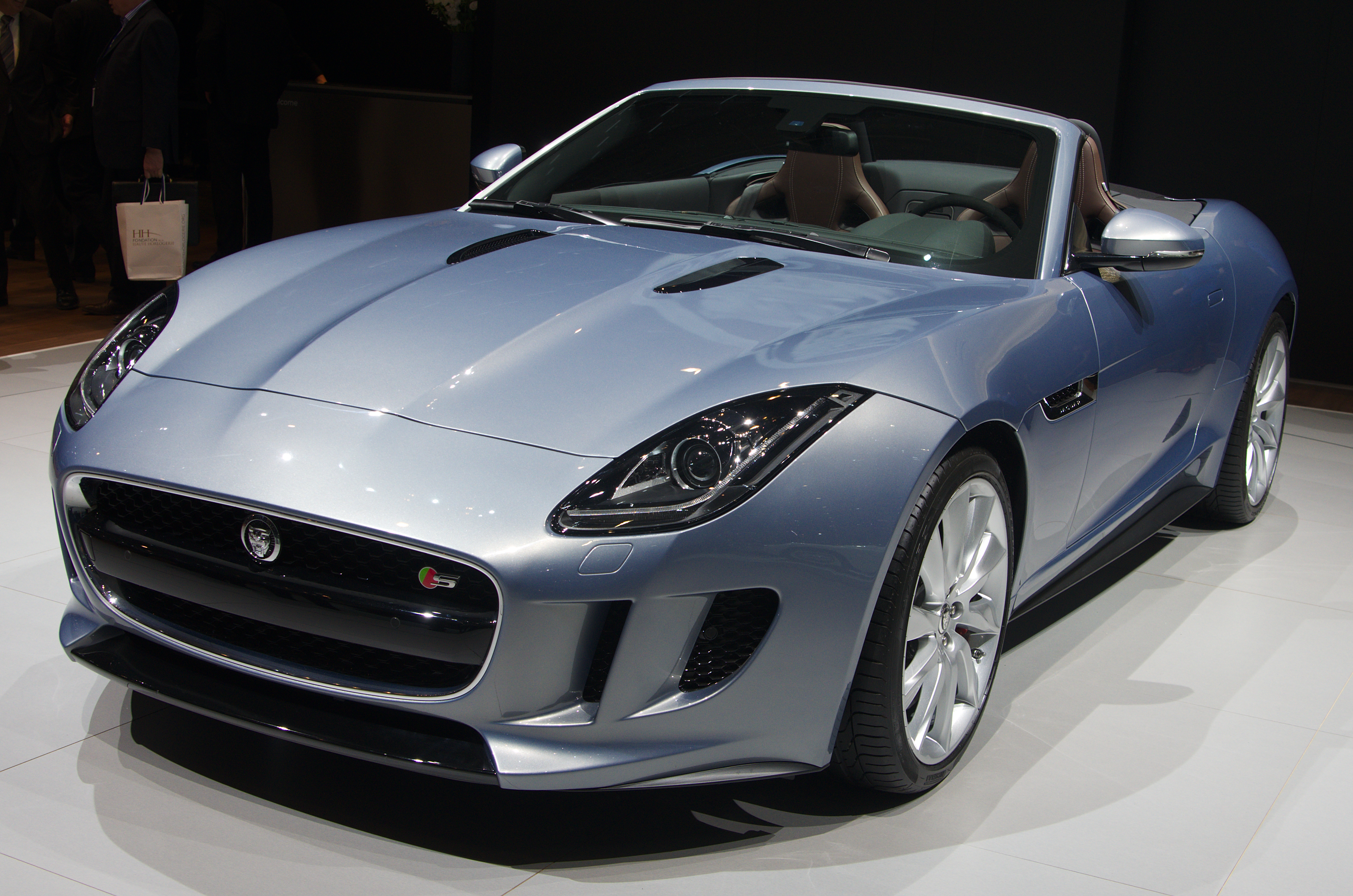
Jaguar F-Type convertible at the 2013 Geneva Motor Show

The convertible version of F-Type was first unveiled at Sundance, London which was followed by a presentation at the 2012 Paris Motor Show and the 2013 Goodwood Festival of Speed (with a bare chassis).

=== F-Type Coupé (2014–2023) ===
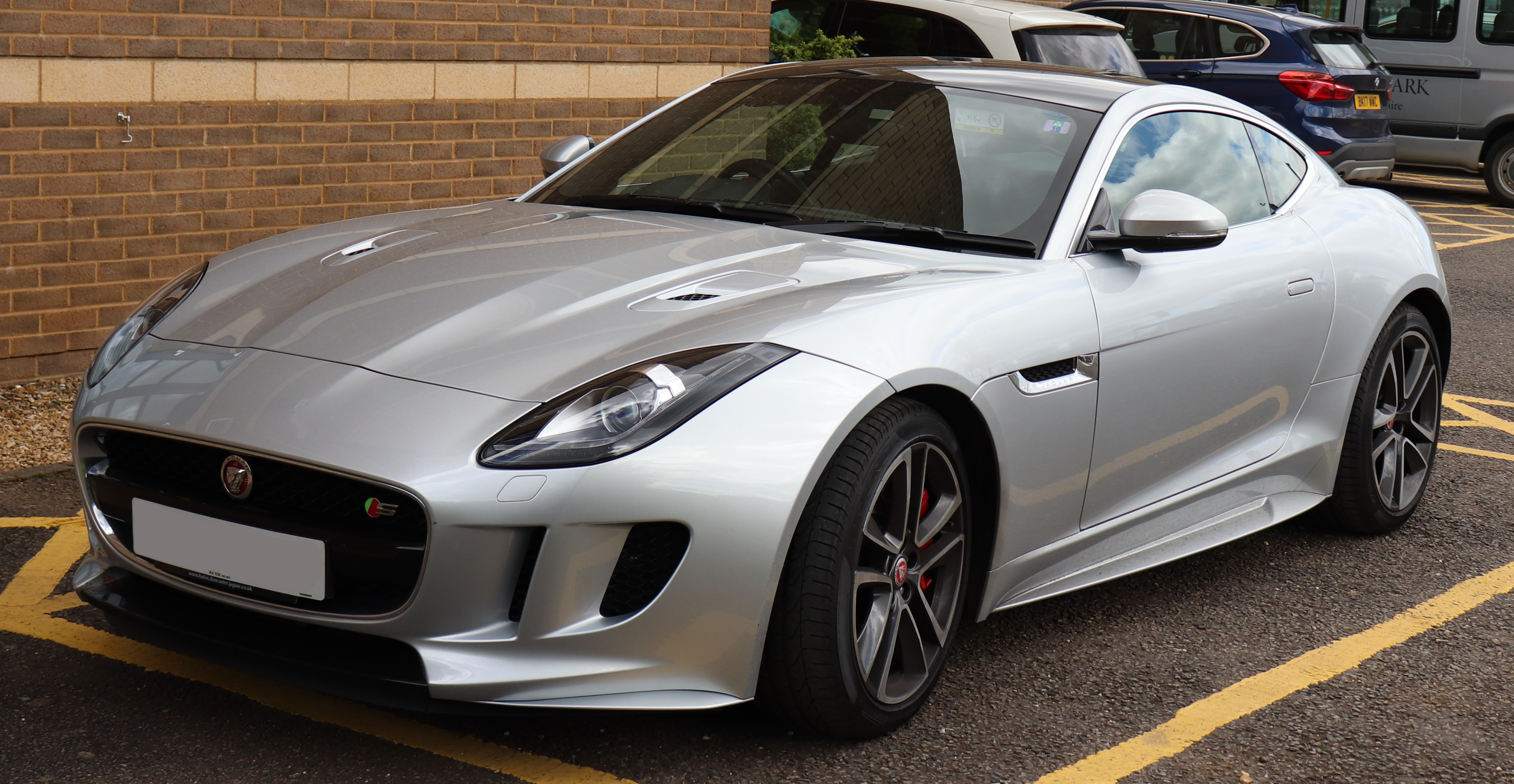

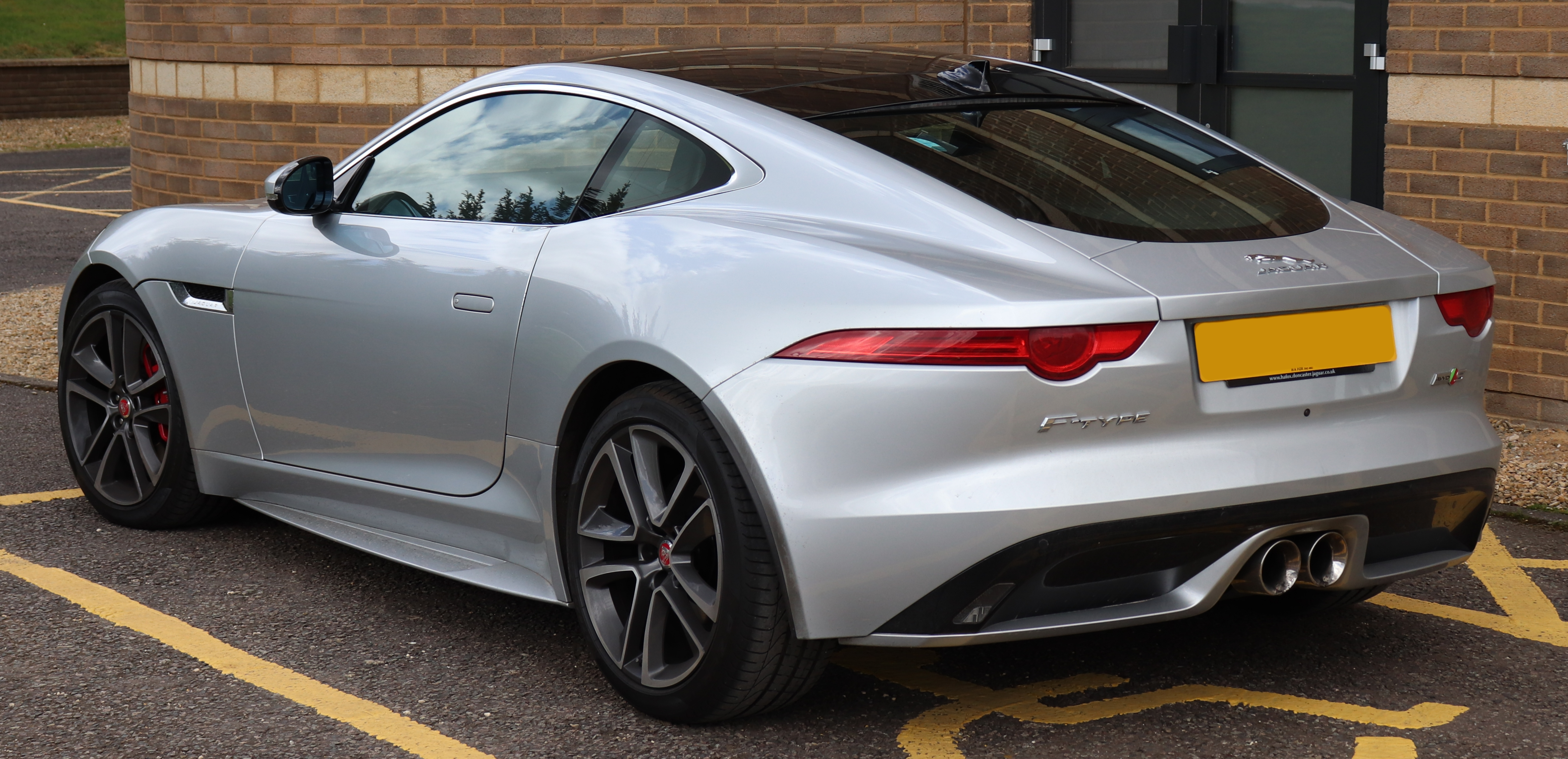
Jaguar F-Type S coupé

The coupé variant of the F-Type was unveiled at the 2013 Los Angeles Auto Show (F-Type R Coupé) and 2013 Tokyo Motor Show, followed by 2013 Jaguar Academy of Sport Annual Awards, an exclusive event in Canary Wharf, London.

The coupé went on sale in spring 2014. Launch models scheduled include the F-Type, F-Type S and F-Type R. Factory production of the all-new F-Type R commenced on 13 November 2013.

=== F-Type SVR (2016–2020) ===
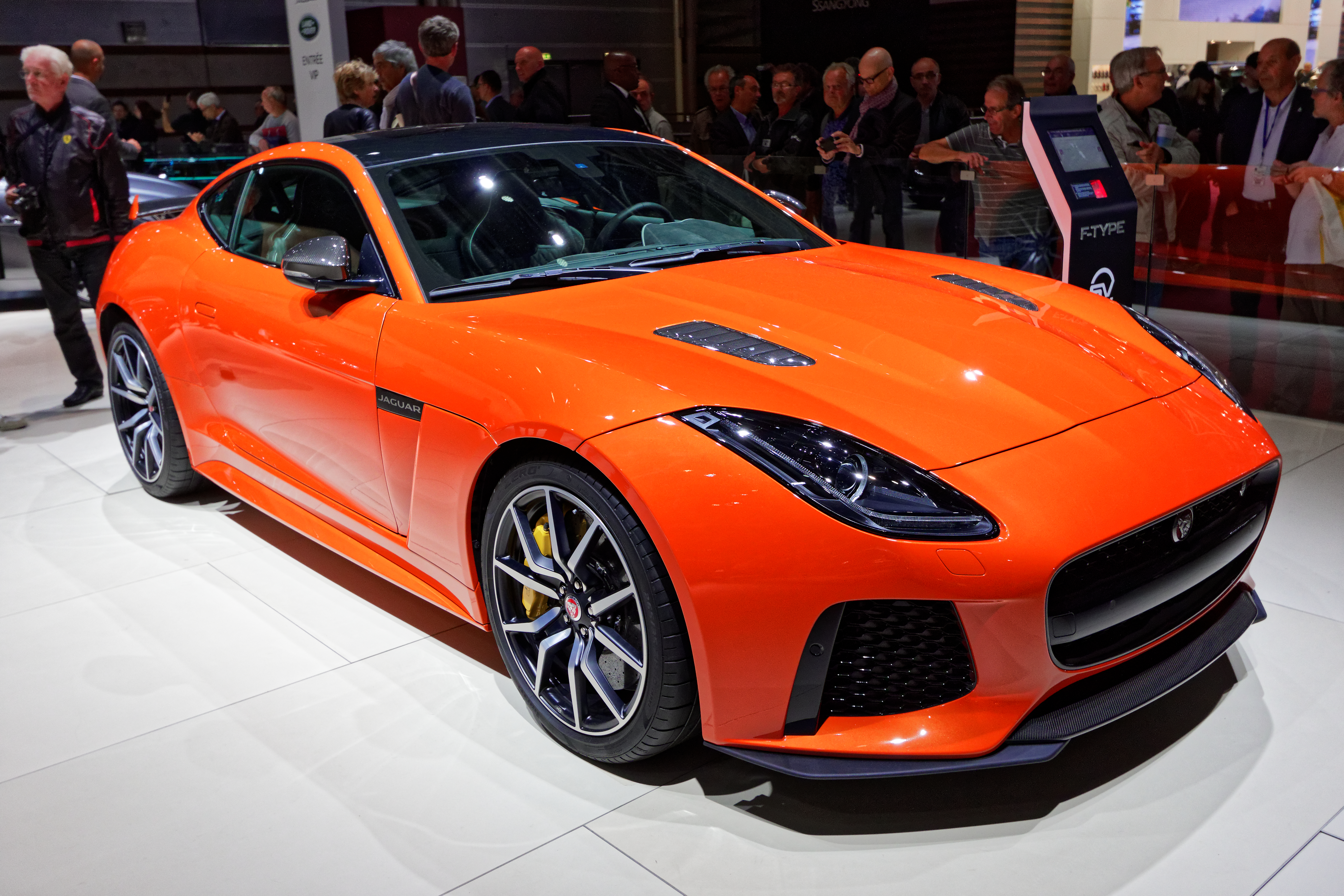
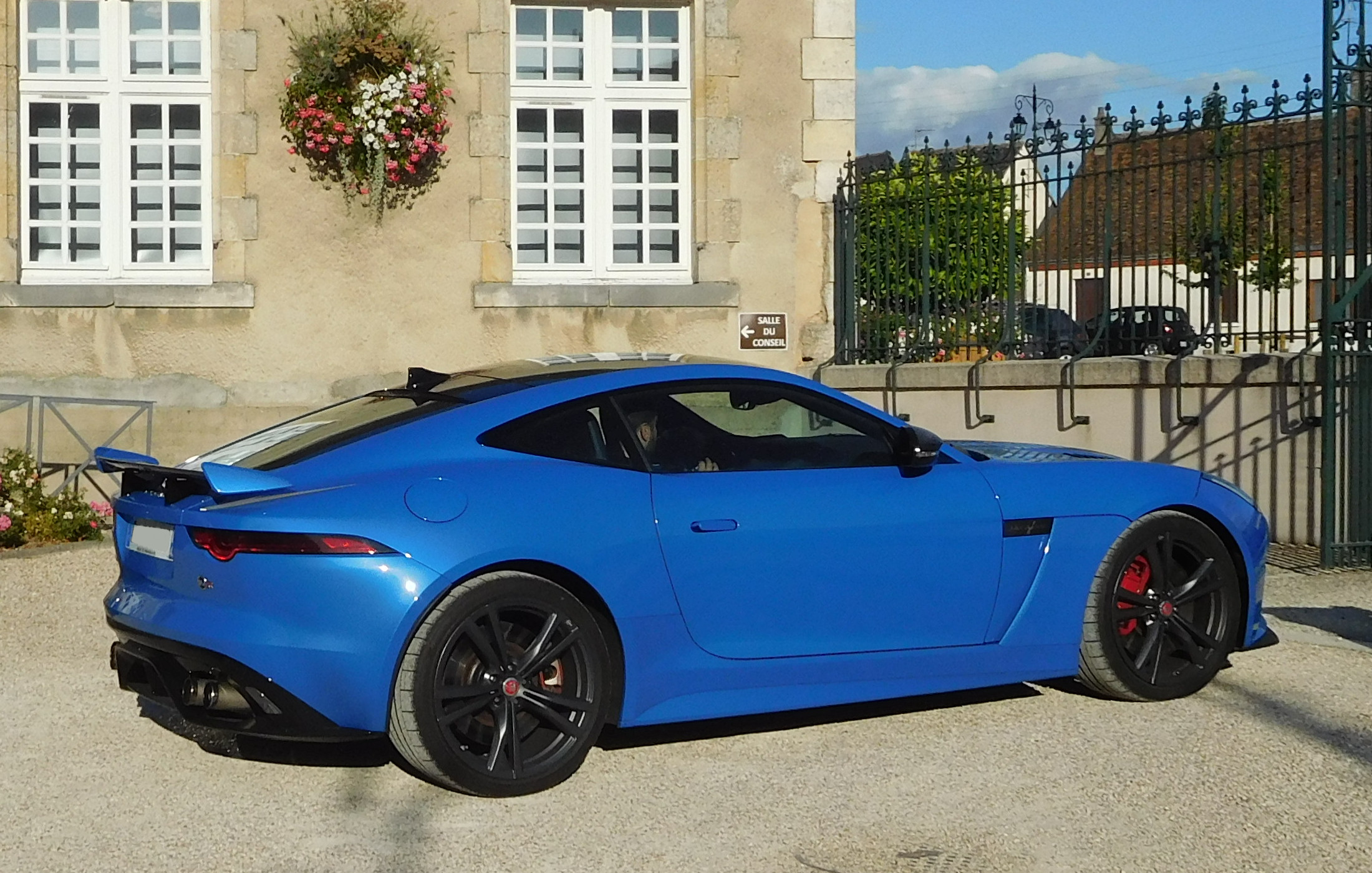
Jaguar F-Type SVR coupé

At the Geneva Motor Show in March 2016, Jaguar unveiled the F-Type SVR. Available in both coupé and convertible body styles along with having all-wheel-drive, it features the same 5.0-litre supercharged V8 engine from the V8 S and R, but has a maximum power output of 575 PS (567 hp; 423 kW) at 6,500 rpm and 700 N⋅m (516 lb⋅ft) of torque at 3,500-5,000 rpm, the car can accelerate from 0–100 km/h (0–62 mph) in 3.5 seconds and can reach a top speed of 322 km/h (200 mph), making it the first Jaguar road car since the XJ220 to reach 322 km/h (200 mph). The SVR convertible can reach a top speed of 312 km/h (194 mph). The F-Type SVR was discontinued in 2020. A total of 1,875 F-Type SVRs were produced.

North America Allocations
Country	Coupes	Convertibles	Total
USA	461	215	676
Canada	102	46	148
Mexico	4		4
Totals	567	261	828

== Facelift (2019) ==
The facelifted F-Type was unveiled in December 2019 (with the model-year 2021 vehicle) with design and technological updates, making model-year 2020 F-Types the last featuring Ian Callum's original design. On the exterior, it received new Pixel LED headlamps, new slender taillamps, 10-spoke 20-inch wheels, and a choice of new exterior paint finishes. Interior features include a new 12.3-inch reconfigurable TFT instrument cluster and a 10-inch Touch Pro infotainment system. The V6 engine option is now only available in North American markets, with the SVR variant discontinued. The lineup now consists of the following models:

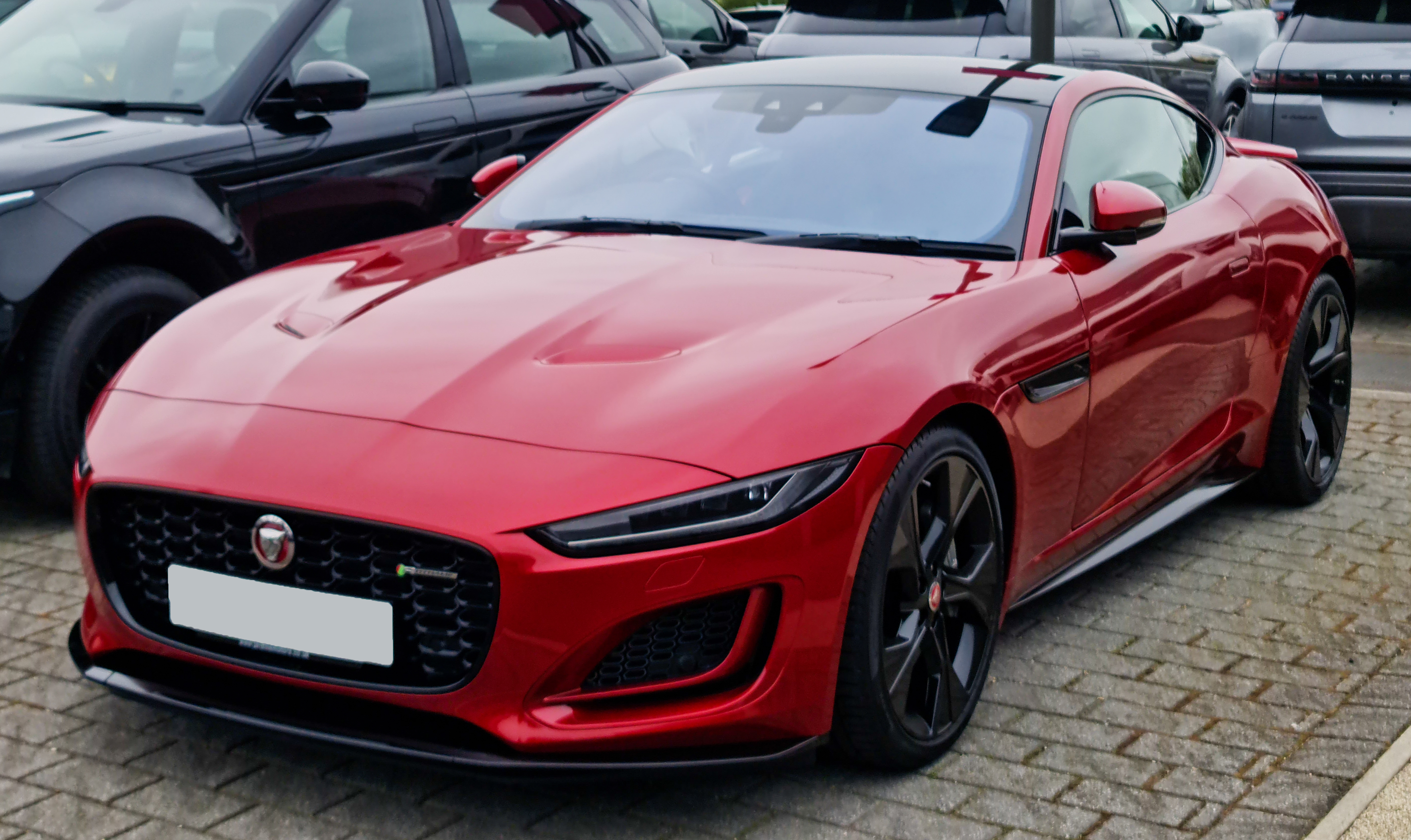
F-Type R-Dynamic coupe facelift

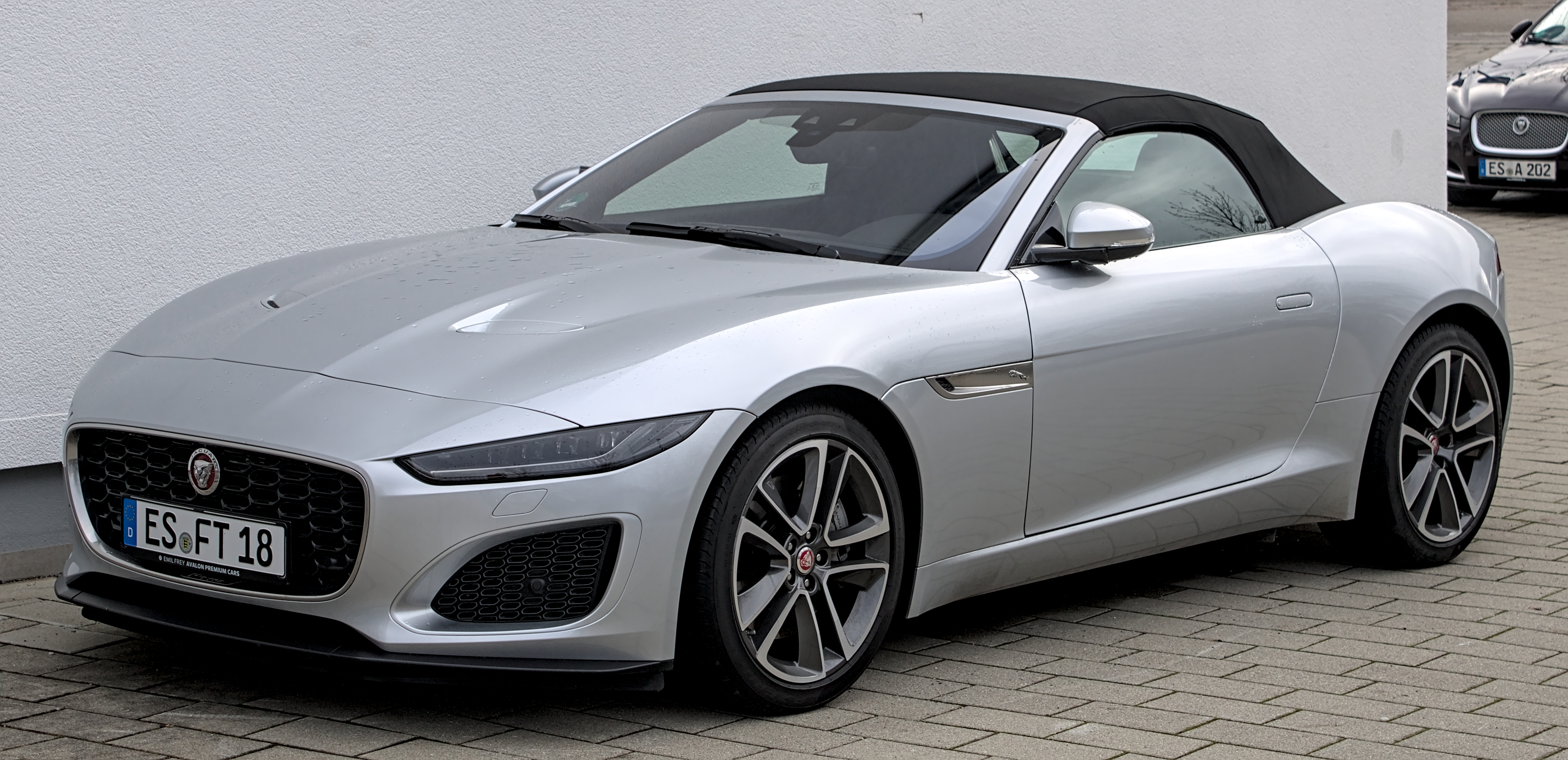
F-Type convertible facelift

=== F-Type P300 ===
The Jaguar F-Type P300 is the entry-level model having a 2.0 L turbocharged inline-4 engine rated at 300 PS (221 kW; 296 hp). It accelerates to 97 km/h (60 mph) in 5.7 seconds and has a top speed of 250 km/h (155 mph). P300 sales in the U.S. were discontinued after model year 2021.

=== 2021 F-Type P380 (North America) ===
This variant of the F-Type is exclusive to North American market and remains the same power wise with a V6 at 380 PS (279 kW; 375 hp). It was only produced for one model year, 2021, after that the P450 replaced it at its price point.

=== F-Type P450 ===
The Jaguar F-Type P450 shares the same 5.0 L supercharged V8 with the F-Type R, but detuned to 450 PS (331 kW; 444 hp). It accelerates to 97 km/h (60 mph) in 4.4 seconds and has a top speed of 285 km/h (177 mph).

=== F-Type R P575 ===
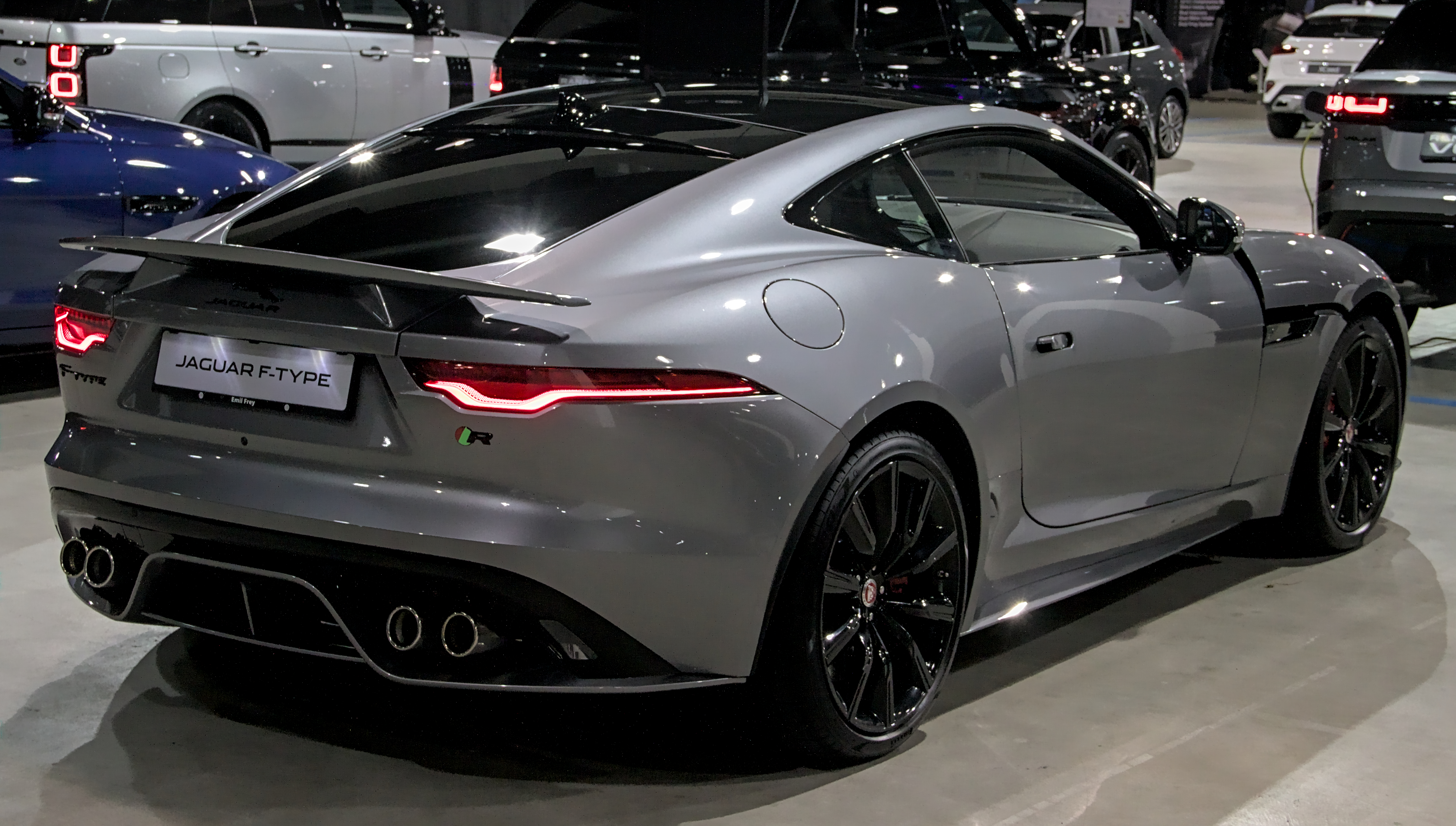
F-Type R P575 coupe facelift

The Jaguar F-Type R has a 5.0 L supercharged V8 rated at 575 PS (423 kW; 567 hp), 25 PS more than the outgoing model. It accelerates to 97 km/h (60 mph) in 3.5 seconds and has an electronically limited top speed of 300 km/h (186 mph).

== Technical details ==
=== Chassis ===
The F-Type utilises an all-aluminium unitary chassis, assembled with flush rivets and glue. Sound and vibration insulation is provided by the addition of a special underbody tray and engine mounts, and a double bulkhead between the engine bay and passenger compartment. The convertible roof is an electrically operated retractable fabric piece. Jaguar says by eschewing metal it can keep the car's centre of gravity low, while a Thinsulate layer means thermal and sound insulation is akin to a solid roof.

=== Powertrain ===
At launch, the entry-level model used Jaguar's new 3.0-litre V6 supercharged petrol engine, producing a maximum power output of 340 PS (250 kW; 335 hp), enabling the car to accelerate from 0 to 97 km/h (0 to 60 mph) in 5.1 seconds, and reach a top speed of 259 km/h (161 mph). The F-Type V6 S has the same engine uprated at 380 PS (279 kW; 375 hp), allowing the car to reach a top speed of 275 km/h (171 mph), and achieve acceleration from 0 to 97 km/h (0 to 60 mph) in 4.8 seconds. Next in the range is the V8 S with 495 hp and then the F-Type R, with Jaguar's 5.0-litre, 550 PS (405 kW; 542 hp) supercharged V8 petrol engine, allowing the car to reach a top speed of 299 km/h (186 mph) and accelerate from 0 to 97 km/h (0 to 60 mph) in 4.0 seconds. Topping the range is the F-Type SVR, with the same engine as the F-Type R uprated at 575 PS (423 kW; 567 hp) enabling the car to reach a top speed of 322 km/h (200 mph) and accelerate from 0 to 97 km/h (0 to 60 mph) in 3.5 seconds. The layout is front-engine, rear-wheel-drive, or all-wheel drive which is standard on the F-Type SVR and P575, optional on the P380 and P450. The gearbox is an eight-speed automatic with paddle-shifters offering manual override. In 2015, a ZF six-speed manual became available as an option on the V6 models. There is a mechanical limited-slip differential on the V6 S and an electronic limited-slip differential on the V8.

In 2018, a 2.0 L turbocharged Inline-4 engine was added as the new entry-level powertrain, which is Jaguar's first four-cylinder sports car and its most powerful on the basis of horsepower per cylinder.

Engine type	Years	Models	Displacement	Power, Torque
2.0-litre turbocharged I4 petrol	2018–	Coupé & Convertible, P300	1,999 cc (122 cu in) (Ingenium AJ200)	300 PS (221 kW; 296 hp) at 5,500 rpm, 400 N⋅m (295 lb⋅ft) at 1,500 rpm
3.0-litre supercharged V6 petrol	2013–2017	Coupé & Convertible	2,995 cc (183 cu in) (AJ126)	340 PS (250 kW; 335 hp) at 6,500 rpm, 450 N⋅m (332 lb⋅ft) at 3,500–5,000 rpm
3.0-litre supercharged V6 petrol	2013–	S Coupé & Convertible, P380	2,995 cc (183 cu in) (AJ126)	380 PS (279 kW; 375 hp) at 6,500 rpm, 460 N⋅m (339 lb⋅ft) at 3,500–5,000 rpm
3.0-litre supercharged V6 petrol	2018–2019	400 Sport Coupé & Convertible	2,995 cc (183 cu in) (AJ126)	400 PS (294 kW; 395 hp) at 6,500 rpm, 460 N⋅m (339 lb⋅ft) at 3,500–5,000 rpm
5.0-litre supercharged V8 petrol	2020–	V8 P450 Coupé & Convertible, P450 R-Dynamic	5,000 cc (305 cu in) (AJ133)	450 PS (331 kW; 444 hp) at 6,000 rpm, 580 N⋅m (428 lb⋅ft) at 2,500 rpm
5.0-litre supercharged V8 petrol	2013–2015	V8 S Convertible	5,000 cc (305 cu in) (AJ133)	495 PS (364 kW; 488 hp) at 6,500 rpm, 625 N⋅m (461 lb⋅ft) at 2,500–5,500 rpm
5.0-litre supercharged V8 petrol	2014–2019	R Coupé & Convertible (R Convertible not available until 2016)	5,000 cc (305 cu in) (AJ133)	550 PS (405 kW; 542 hp) at 6,500 rpm, 680 N⋅m (502 lb⋅ft) at 2,500–5,500 rpm
5.0-litre supercharged V8 petrol	2014–	Project 7, SVR Coupé & Convertible, R P575 Coupé & Convertible	5,000 cc (305 cu in) (AJ133)	575 PS (423 kW; 567 hp), 700 N⋅m (516 lb⋅ft)

=== Suspension ===
The F-Type has a double-wishbone front and rear suspension with adaptive dampers and adjustable suspension settings to allow the driver to adjust ride and handling. The car has a total of 25 different driving modes programmed to suit different road conditions and driving styles.

=== Interior ===
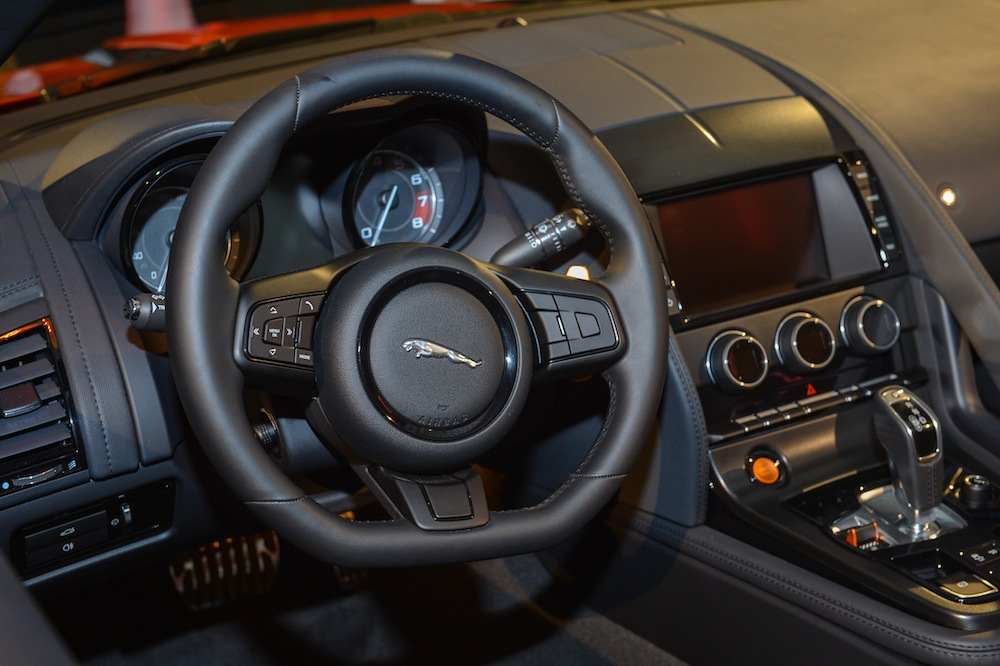
Interior

The interior of the F-Type has a two-seater setup with leather upholstery and control buttons finished in aluminium. There is a touchscreen display in the centre console and another TFT display between the dials in the instrument panel. There is also a choice of flat-bottom or Alcantara finish for the three-spoke steering wheel and buttons finished in soft-feel matte black.

=== Equipment ===
The F-Type debuted a stop-start engine shutoff function, which Jaguar claims boosts economy by 5 percent.

The F-Type features bi-xenon headlights with integrated LED daytime running lights, along with full LED lighting at the rear. The S and V8 S versions come equipped with an "active exhaust system" which opens special valves over 3,000 rpm to intensify the sound profile.

There is a retractable rear wing and door handles that are left hidden with the bodywork until needed. The fabric roof on the convertible raises or lowers in 12 seconds, and can be used when the car is moving at up to 48 km/h (30 mph).

The audio systems offered, use Meridian technology with either 380 W spread across ten speakers or 770 W across twelve speakers.

=== Worldwide sales ===
Year	Sales
2013	2,250
2014	4,112
2015	4,659
2016	4,069
Total	15,090

Source: Tata Motors

Year	China
2023	305
2024	332
2025	14

=== Marketing ===
In August 2012, it was announced that American singer-songwriter Lana Del Rey would be the face of the F-Type, which premiered at the Paris Motor Show in September 2012. The car won Car of The Year at the 2013 Middle East Motor Awards.

In April 2013 a short film called Desire was launched at the 2013 Sundance Film Festival to promote the Jaguar F-Type. Directed by Adam Smith from Ridley Scott Associates, starring Damian Lewis, Jordi Molla and Shannyn Sossamon.

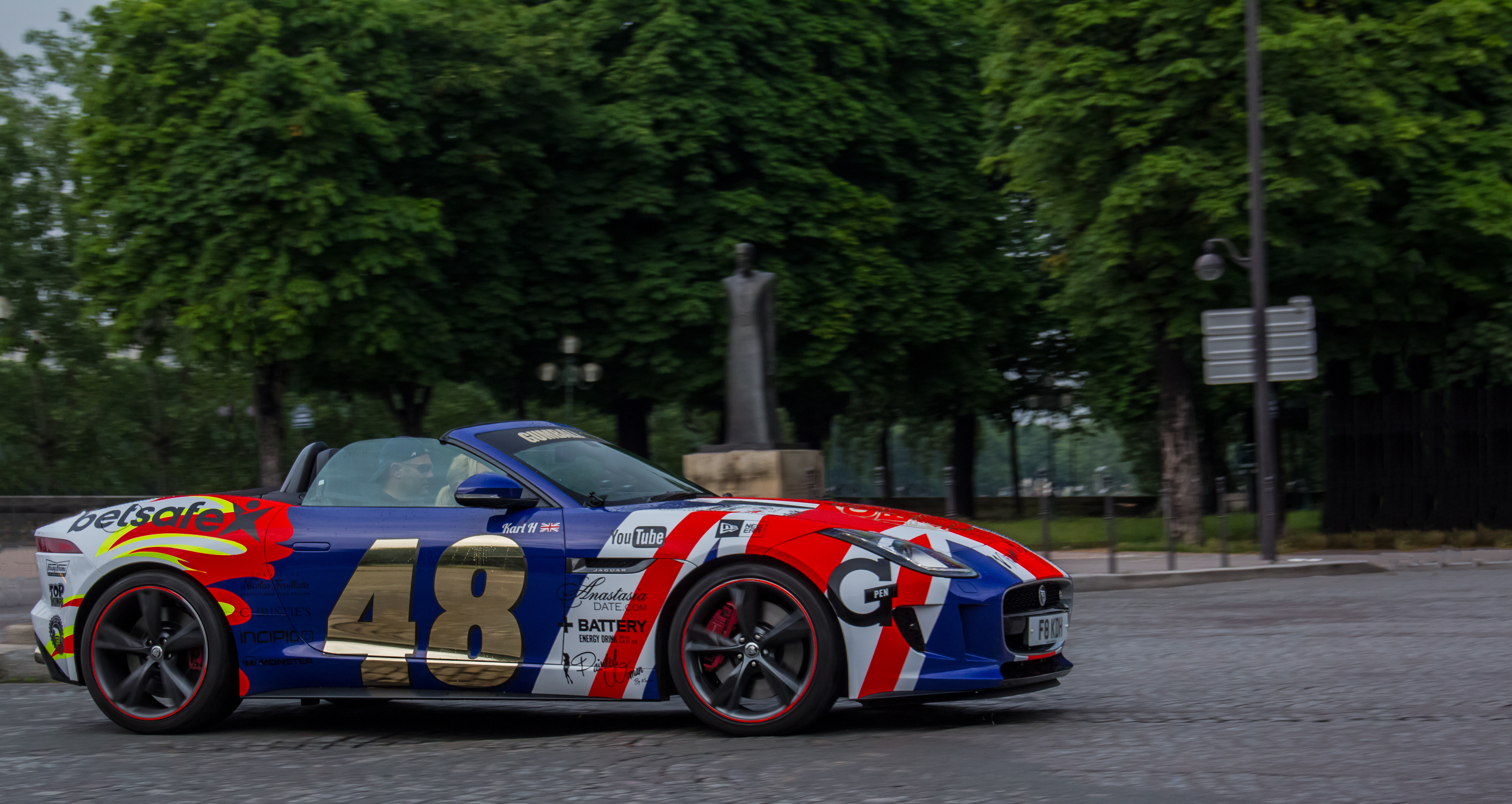
An F-Type in the Union Jack livery, part of Jaguar's promotional campaign

As part of the convertible launch celebration in the UK, Jaguar launched its #YourTurnBritain campaign; inviting people to share photos that encapsulate the best of modern Britain through social media. The best images would win one of four F-Type driving experiences. A fleet of Union Jack liveried F-Types embarked on a 'Best of British' promotional tour as part of the car's launch and the campaign.

David Gandy was featured in a film titled 'Escapism' featuring a Jaguar F-Type convertible. In the film, Gandy gave the viewers insight into his life as he invited them on a road trip that started at dusk as he escaped 'the craziness of London'. David Gandy: Escapism features the style icon driving his favourite British heritage cars from the C-Type, E-Type and XKSS, through to the very latest F-Type. The film was previewed at the 2013 Goodwood Revival.

As part of the F-Type coupé launch in the US, a 60-second TV commercial titled 'Rendezvous' was premiered the fourth quarter of Super Bowl XLVIII. In addition, a dozen New York City Subway trains were wrapped with ads advertising the F-TYPE in preparation for the Super Bowl XLVIII. On 2 February 2014, Jaguar unveiled the new coupé through a Super Bowl advertisement.

As part of the Jaguar F-Type Coupé launch in China, David Beckham joined Jaguar as a brand ambassador. The print creative material used in this campaign was produced by fashion photographer and filmmaker Peter Lindbergh.

== Limited editions ==
=== 400 Sport ===
The Jaguar F-Type 400 Sport, a special-edition model that would remain on sale for just one year, was launched as part of a raft of revisions to the British sports car. The F-Type 400 Sport launch edition is powered by an upgraded version of the 3.0-litre supercharged V6 engine producing a power output of 400 PS (294 kW; 395 hp) (hence the name) and the addition of the Super Performance braking system (which features 380 mm front and 376 mm rear discs and black callipers with 400 Sport logo) and a Configurable Dynamics system which allows drivers to select individual settings for the throttle, transmission, steering and dampers. The F-Type 400 Sport features unique 20-inch alloy wheels.

The car features '400 Sport' badges on the front splitter and rear of the car, as well as the centre console, steering wheel, tread plates and embroidered headrests. The F-Type 400 is available as either a coupé or convertible and in either rear or all-wheel drive.

=== Project 7 ===
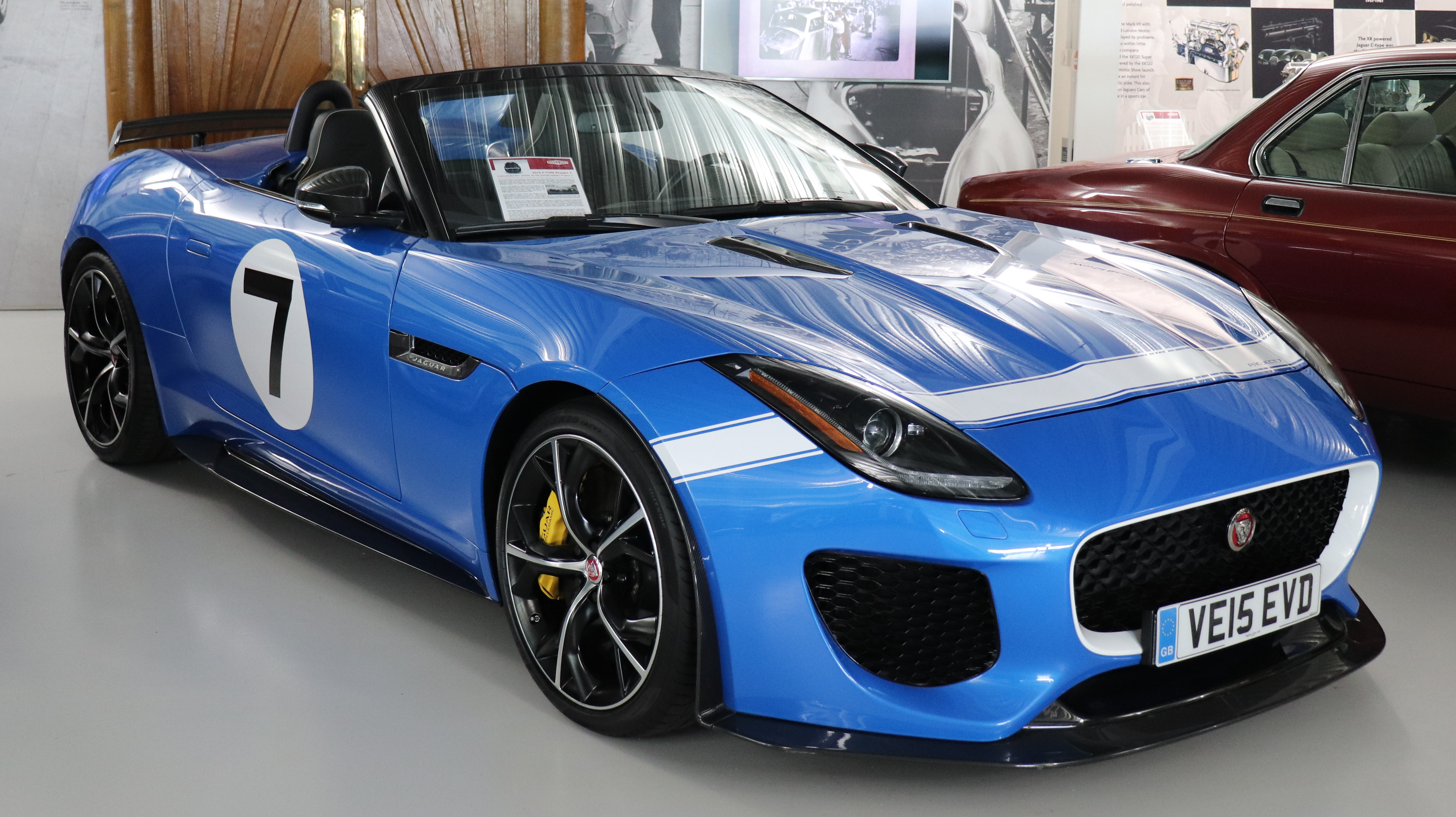
The Jaguar F-Type Project 7

The Project 7 is based on the F-Type Convertible, and is powered by a 5.0-litre supercharged V8 engine, generating a maximum power output of 575 PS (423 kW). The engine is shared with the F-Type SVR. Only up to 250 units were made and the car is considered to be Jaguar's most powerful production car ever, alongside the F-Type SVR. The body shell of the car is made from aluminium, reminiscing the historical D-Type LeMans winner. Visually, it features an 'Aero Haunch' behind the driver, similar to 1950s D-Type, a quad exhaust and a fixed rear spoiler. The Project 7 has a claimed 0–97 km/h (0–60 mph) acceleration time of 3.8 seconds and a top speed of 299 km/h (186 mph).

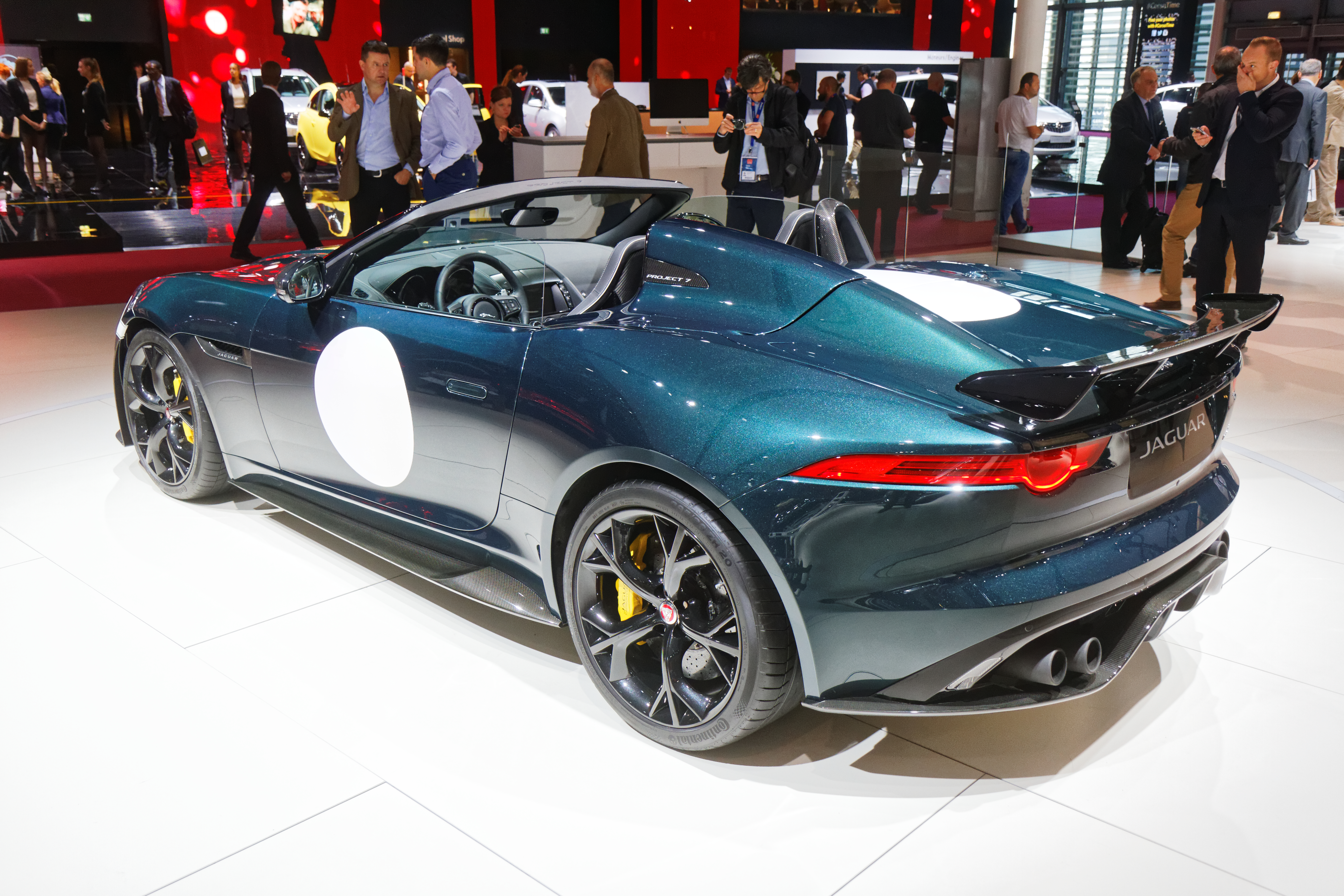
Rear view with the Aero Haunch visible

The Project 7 is a skunkworks design penned by Italian-Brazilian designer César Pieri. It was discovered by chance when Pieri accidentally showed it to Jaguar chief-designer Ian Callum. The concept then became a functional prototype and eventually reached production.

=== ZP Edition ===
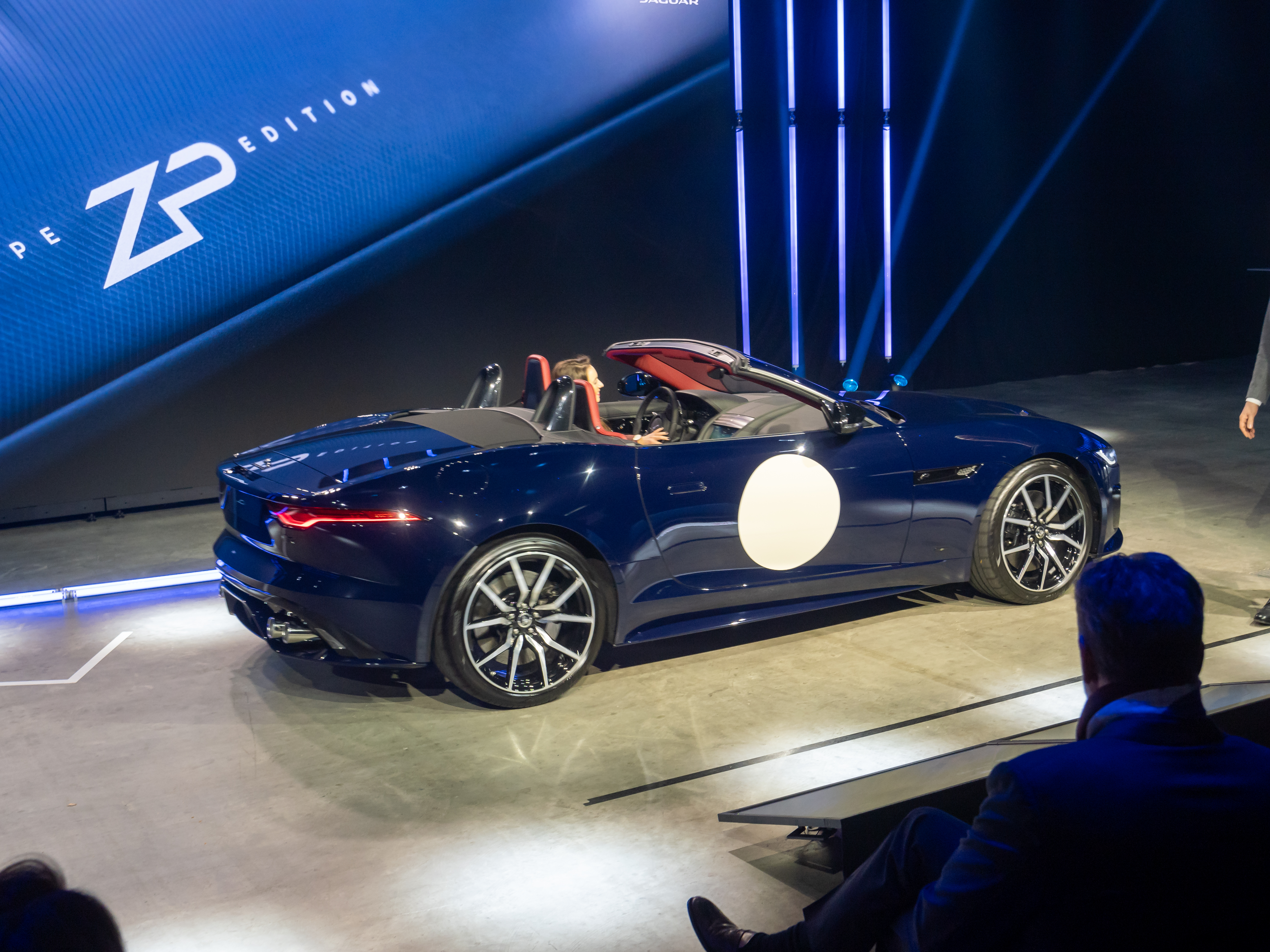
ZP Edition convertible in Oulton Blue

To commemorate the end of the E-Type production and the end of internal combustion drivetrains at Jaguar, the ZP edition was launched in late 2024. Based on the F-Type R P575, 150 vehicles were offered in coupe or convertible body style with special color schemes like "Oulton Blue" and "Crystal Grey" and exclusive SV upgrades.

== Motorsport ==
=== F-Type SVR GT4 ===
On 11 January 2018, it was formally announced that the F-Type SVR would be entered into GT4 competition, competing in the 2018 British GT Championship with Invictus Games Racing. The team was established in 2018 to offer wounded, injured, or sick members of the armed forces the opportunity to compete in motorsport. The cars were commissioned by James Holder, co-founder of the clothing brand Superdry, and developed by Jaguar's Special Vehicle Operations division.

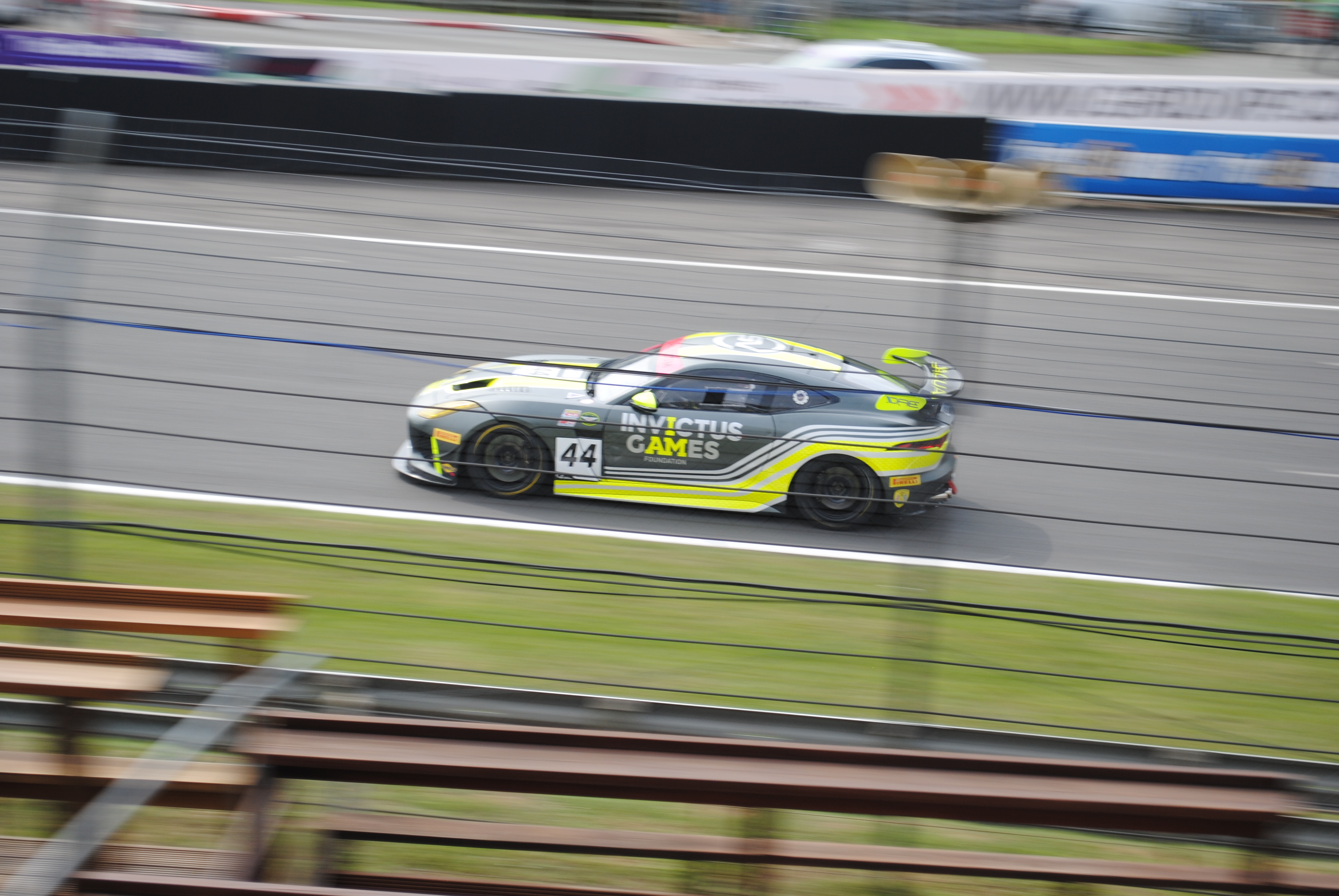
The Jaguar F-Type SVR GT4 at Brands Hatch.

The F-Type SVR GT4 would fail to find much success in its two years of competition in the British GT Championship. Invictus Games Racing fielded two cars for the 2018 season but finished last in the GT4 team standings. Only one car was entered for the 2019 season, with the other relegated to testing duties. The team achieved its sole podium finish at Oulton Park and finish 12th out of 15 classified entrants. The F-Type SVR GT4 saw no further action after the season, with both cars being put up for auction on 21 and 22 February 2020.
