= Bladon Jets =

Bladon Micro Turbine (UK)
- Company type: Private limited company
- Founded: 2002
- Founder: Chris and Paul Bladon
- Headquarters: Coventry, United Kingdom, England
- Products: Micro Gas Turbines, Heat Exchangers, Micro Air Bearings and Automotive Range Extenders
- Website: bladonmt.com

Bladon or Bladon Micro Turbine (formerly called Bladon Jets) is a pioneer in the design, development and manufacture of Micro Turbine Gensets (MTGs) - using high-speed, ultra reliable and clean-burning microturbines. This British company designs the microturbine to provide electric power up to 12 kW. Bladon is a British company and was also involved in the development of Automotive Range Extenders in a special project with Jaguar Land Rover.

Bladon is now focused on designing, manufacturing and selling microturbine generator sets (MTGs) to the telecommunications market. More specifically, the MTGs are designed to provide reliable power to mobile telecommunications towers, especially those that are located in remote areas or are connected to unreliable electric networks.

== History ==
In 2012 the company won a £3.1m Regional Growth Fund award to assist in its development of a research and development facility in Coventry, UK.

Jaguar Cars chose Bladon Jets to supply the turbines used in its C-X75 concept electric sports car to generate electricity to extend the range of its battery.

The company was founded by twin brothers Chris and Paul Bladon who are closely associated with the Isle of Man TT races, with the Paul Bladon Trophy awarded annually to the rider who completes the fastest lap in their class in the Post Classic event at the Manx Grand Prix. Paul Bladon died in 2008 after a long battle with cancer.
