= Middle East Motor Awards =

Auto award

Middle East Motor Awards (MEMA) is an auto award in the Middle East, with a ‘Car of the Year' honor as well as individual category winners. The awards are given to newly released or redesigned vehicles released to the regional car market, annually since 2010. The awards are judged by a panel of distinguished and expert automotive journalists.

== 2010 Winners ==
Best Small Saloon: Chevrolet Cruze
Best Midsize Saloon: Hyundai Sonata
Best Large Saloon: Nissan Maxima
Best Premium Saloon: Mercedes-Benz E-Class
Best Luxury Saloon: Mercedes S500
Best Luxury Sports Saloon: Porsche Panamera Turbo
Best Premium Luxury Saloon: Rolls-Royce Ghost
Best Midsize SUV: Volvo XC60
Best Large SUV: Toyota Land Cruiser
Best Premium Sports SUV: Mercedes-Benz ML63 AMG
Best Premium Luxury SUV: Range Rover Vogue
Best Compact Car: Volkswagen Scirocco
Best Sports Car: Porsche Cayman S
Best Premium Sports Car: Porsche 911 Turbo
Best Exotic Car: Ferrari 458 Italia
Best Hybrid Saloon: Lexus LS 600h L
Best Hybrid SUV: BMW X6 Active Hybrid

== 2011 Winners ==
Car of the year: Volvo S60
Best Sub Compact: Hyundai Accent
Best Small Sedan: Hyundai Elantra
Best Midsize Sedan: Kia Optima
Best Large Sedan: Dodge Charger
Best Executive Sedan: Audi A6
Best Performance Sedan: BMW M3
Best Premium Sports Sedan: Mercedes-Benz CLS-Class (W218)
Best Luxury Car: Jaguar XJ
Best Premium Luxury Car: Rolls-Royce Ghost Extended Wheelbase
Best Compact SUV: Kia Sportage
Best Midsize SUV: Jeep Grand Cherokee
Best Luxury SUV: Land Rover Range Rover
Best Performance SUV: Porsche Cayenne Turbo
Best Truck: Ford F-150
Best Premium Sub Compact: Volkswagen Golf R
Best Sports Car: Ford Mustang
Best Premium Sports Car: Porsche 911 GTS
Best Sports Convertible: Nissan 370Z
Best Premium Sports Convertible: Audi R8 Spyder
Best Supercar: Lamborghini Aventador

== 2012 Winners ==
Car of the year: McLaren MP4-12C
Best Small Sedan: Kia Rio Sedan
Best Midsize Sedan: Volkswagen Passat
Best Executive Sedan: Lexus GS 350
Best Performance Sedan: BMW M5
Best Crossover: Honda CR-V
Best Midsize SUV: Ford Explorer
Best Premium Midsize SUV: Range Rover Evoque
Best Premium Large SUV: Mercedes-Benz ML-Class
Best Performance SUV: Mercedes-Benz ML63 AMG
Best Hatchback: Hyundai Veloster
Best Premium Hatchback: Volkswagen Scirocco R
Best Sports Coupe: Toyota 86
Best Premium Sports Coupe: Porsche 911 Carrera
Best Sports Convertible: Porsche Boxster
Best Premium Sports Convertible: Porsche 911 Carrera Cabrio
Best Premium Luxury Coupe: Bentley Continental GT V8
Best Supercar: McLaren MP4-12C

== 2013 Winners ==
Car of the year: Jaguar F-Type
Best Small Sedan: Peugeot 301
Best Midsize Sedan: Honda Accord
Best Large Sedan: Chevrolet Impala
Best Executive Sedan: Cadillac ATS
Best Luxury Sedan: Lexus LS 460
Best Luxury Performance Sedan: BMW M6 Gran Coupe
Best Crossover: Toyota RAV4
Best Midsize SUV: Jeep Grand Cherokee
Best Luxury SUV: Land Rover Range Rover
Best Performance SUV: Porsche Cayenne Turbo S
Best Small Hatchback: Volkswagen Golf
Best Performance Hatchback: Ford Focus ST
Best Premium Hatchback: Mercedes-Benz A 250
Best Sports Coupe: Porsche Cayman
Best Premium Sports Coupe: Maserati GranTurismo Sport
Best Premium Sports Convertible: Jaguar F-Type
Best Premium Luxury Convertible: Bentley Continental GTC Speed
Best Supercar: McLaren 12C Spider
