= List of Fifth Gear episodes =

Fifth Gear is a British motoring television magazine series. Originally shown on Channel 5 from 2002 to 2011, Discovery from 2012 to 2014, History in 2015 and Quest since 2018. The show is currently presented by Jason Plato, Vicki Butler-Henderson, Jonny Smith and Jimmy de Ville with occasional appearances from Karun Chandhok. Fifth Gear's rival show is BBC Two's Top Gear.

Fifth Gear has been broadcast since 8 April 2002. Since then, 28 series have been produced with 271 episodes.

== Series overview ==
Series	Episodes	Originally released	
Series	Episodes	First released	Last released
1	11	8 April 2002	17 June 2002
2	10	7 October 2002	16 December 2002
3	10	12 March 2003	28 May 2003
4	10	13 October 2003	15 December 2003
5	10	29 March 2004	31 May 2004
6	10	11 October 2004	13 December 2004
7	10	21 March 2005	23 May 2005
8	10	10 October 2005	19 December 2005
9	13	10 April 2006	24 July 2006
10	13	25 September 2006	18 December 2006
11	10	30 April 2007	2 August 2007
12	8	3 September 2007	22 October 2007
13	10	21 January 2008	24 March 2008
14	8	11 August 2008	29 September 2008
15	8	5 January 2009	23 February 2009
16	8	8 June 2009	27 July 2009
17	10	3 June 2010	12 August 2010
18	10	8 October 2010	10 December 2010
19	10	15 April 2011	15 July 2011
20	10	14 October 2011	30 December 2011
21	9	3 September 2012	29 October 2012
22	9	11 February 2013	8 April 2013
23	9	13 September 2013	11 November 2013
24	9	24 February 2014	21 April 2014
25	6	6 March 2015	9 April 2015
26	6	2 July 2015	13 August 2015
27	8	2 September 2018	25 October 2018
28	10	3 October 2019	5 December 2019
29	6	12 September 2024	17 October 2024

== Episodes ==
=== Series 1 (2002) ===
No. overall	No. in season	Title	Reviews/Drives	Original release date
1	1	"Series 1, Episode 1"	Lamborghini Murciélago • Quentin Willson Talks about speed camera • Tuned Nissan Sunny GTi-R vs. Dodge Viper GTS • Citroën C3	8 April 2002
2	2	"Series 1, Episode 2"	Quentin Talks about Classic Cars • Jaguar S-Type • Maserati Ghibli • Morris Minor • Nissan Primera • Tuned Citroën Saxo • Range Rover Vogue vs. BMW X5 4.6is vs. Mercedes-Benz ML 500	15 April 2002
3	3	"Series 1, Episode 3"	Mercedes-Benz E320 CDI • Vicki’s Off-Road Motorcycle Training with Chief Instructor Simon Pavey • BMW F650 • Rolls-Royce Silver Shadow • Subaru Impreza WRX STI vs. Mitsubishi Lancer Evo VII	22 April 2002
4	4	"Series 1, Episode 4"	Ford Focus ST170 • Quentin Talks about Road safety • Ford Model T • Tiff Drives Tiger Z100 to break the 0-60mph record	29 April 2002
5	5	"Series 1, Episode 5"	Pagani Zonda S • BMW 318i (E36) • Britain’s Loudest Car • VW Golf Mk2 • Honda Jazz • American SUVs	6 May 2002
6	6	"Series 1, Episode 6"	MG TF • Quentin Talks about speeding tickets • BMW 745i • Vicki at Locost racing series	13 May 2002
7	7	"Series 1, Episode 7"	Vauxhall Vectra • Mazda6 • Mini Cooper JCW Club Sport • Mercedes-Benz 500SL • Jaguar XK8	20 May 2002
8	8	"Series 1, Episode 8"	Renault Vel Satis • Quentin test drives a LPG converted car • Tiff Talks to Tom Chilton • Alfa Romeo 156 GTA	27 May 2002
9	9	"Series 1, Episode 9"	Audi A4 Cabriolet 2.4 V6 • Ford Ka • Tom Ford talks about Hot Rods • Jaguar S-Type R vs. BMW M5 (E39)	3 June 2002
10	10	"Series 1, Episode 10"	Hyundai Coupe • Quentin Investigate the effects of cannabis while driving • Tiff and Vicki participate in 2H Endurance Radical race • Diesel Superminis: VW Polo & SEAT Ibiza & Ford Fiesta	10 June 2002
11	11	"Series 1, Episode 11"	VW Phaeton • Racetorations Triumph TR5 • Quentin Talks more about speed cameras • LDV Convoy • Mini Cooper S	17 June 2002

=== Series 2 (2002) ===
No. overall	No. in season	Title	Reviews/Drives	Original release date
12	1	"Series 2, Episode 1"	Audi A8 4.2 quattro • Quentin and Tiff help billionaire John Caudwell choose new cars (Town Car: Honda Jazz & Mini Cooper & Ford Focus 1.8 Zetec • Track Car: Ariel Atom & Caterham R300 & Noble M12 • Luxury Car: Range Rover Vogue & BMW X5 & Ferrari 456 & Mercedes-Benz SL55 AMG & BMW M5 • Pagani Zonda S 7.3) • Vicki Rides the Ducati 999	7 October 2002
13	2	"Series 2, Episode 2"	Tiff test drive Mercedes-Benz SL55 AMG & Porsche 911 Turbo (996) • Smart Crossblade • Aston Martin Lagonda Series 2 & 4 • Dutton Commander	14 October 2002
14	3	"Series 2, Episode 3"	Volvo XC90 • Vicki talks about parking tickets • Modified cars at Silverstone TRAX • BMW 635CSi • Vicki and Tiff Race in Scottish Rally Championship with a Peugeot 206 Super Cup	21 October 2002
15	4	"Series 2, Episode 4"	Honda Civic Type R • SEAT León Cupra R • Ford Focus RS • Vicki advice on should you buy a second hand Lotus Elise • Personal license plates • Renault Espace	28 October 2002
16	5	"Series 2, Episode 5"	Paris Motor Show (Ford StreetKa • Smart Roadster • BMW Z4 Roadster • Nissan Micra • Citroën C3 Pluriel • Renault Mégane • Porsche Cayenne • Chrysler Crossfire • Citroën C-Airdream • Renault Ellipse • Opel ECO Speedster • Jaguar XJ • Maybach 62 • Bentley Continental GT • Alfa Romeo Brera Concept) • Tiff drives a Ferrari Enzo at Fiorano	4 November 2002
17	6	"Series 2, Episode 6"	Nissan 350Z • Handbrake Parallel Parking with Instructor Russ Swift • Tom enter the Caterham Academy in a Caterham Seven Roadsport • How to find cheap cars	11 November 2002
18	7	"Series 2, Episode 7"	Behind a Scene of James Bond movie Die Another Day and Bond’s Aston Martin Vanquish • Nissan Micra • Haunted cars and the devil's Ford Capri • Vicki takes a Bentley Arnage T to the Santa Pod Raceway	25 November 2002
19	8	"Series 2, Episode 8"	British Motor Show • BMW Z4 3.0i Roadster • Ford Fusion • Vicki talk about all variation of road side cameras • Hummer H2	2 December 2002
20	9	"Series 2, Episode 9"	TBA	9 December 2002
21	10	"Series 2, Episode 10"	TBA	16 December 2002

=== Series 3 (2003) ===
No. overall	No. in season	Title	Original release date
22	1	"Ultimate Crash Test"	12 March 2003
23	2	"Exploding Cars"	19 March 2003
24	3	"Roll-Over"	26 March 2003
25	4	"Series 3, Episode 4"	2 April 2003
26	5	"Bullet Proof Cars"	14 April 2003
27	6	"Road Rage"	30 April 2003
28	7	"Series 3, Episode 7"	7 May 2003
29	8	"World's Greatest Sports Car"	14 May 2003
30	9	"Series 3, Episode 9"	21 May 2003
31	10	"Series 3, Episode 10"	28 May 2003

=== Series 4 (2003) ===
No. overall	No. in season	Title	Original release date
32	1	"Pile-Up"	13 October 2003
33	2	"Ultimate Stealth Car"	20 October 2003
34	3	"Ultimate New Car Bargain"	27 October 2003
35	4	"Best Cars of the 80s"	3 November 2003
36	5	"Drifting"	10 November 2003
37	6	"Motorway Truck Side-Swipe"	17 November 2003
38	7	"Ultimate Shoot Out"	24 November 2003
39	8	"Confronting the Clampers"	1 December 2003
40	9	"Killer Luggage"	8 December 2003
41	10	"The Nation's Favourite Ferrari"	15 December 2003

=== Series 5 (2004) ===
No. overall	No. in season	Title	Original release date
42	1	"When New Cars Hit Old Cars"	29 March 2004
43	2	"Cars V Planes"	5 April 2004
44	3	"Scared Drivers"	12 April 2004
45	4	"High-Speed Blow-out"	19 April 2004
46	5	"Ultimate Minis"	26 April 2004
47	6	"Buying Schumacher's Car"	3 May 2004
48	7	"Britain's Best 4x4"	10 May 2004
49	8	"The Science of Car Jumps"	17 May 2004
50	9	"Celebrity Cars"	24 May 2004
51	10	"Motor Show Special"	31 May 2004

=== Series 6 (2004) ===
No. overall	No. in season	Title	Original release date
52	1	"The Jenson Button Racing Challenge"	11 October 2004
53	2	"The Ultimate Supercar?"	18 October 2004
54	3	"Ultimate Economy Cars"	25 October 2004
55	4	"High Speed Smart Crash"	1 November 2004
56	5	"Best of British"	8 November 2004
57	6	"Driving Chris Ryan"	15 November 2004
58	7	"Ultimate MPVs"	22 November 2004
59	8	"Caravan Racing"	29 November 2004
60	9	"Hitting Pedestrians"	6 December 2004
61	10	"Awards 2004"	13 December 2004

=== Series 7 (2005) ===
No. overall	No. in season	Title	Reviews/Drives	Original release date
62	1	"Series 7, Episode 1"	Porsche Boxster • Free Speed Camera Database • BMW Z4 • Vicki's Stunt Training	21 March 2005
63	2	"Series 7, Episode 2"	BMW 320d • Mercedes-Benz SLK55 AMG vs. Mercedes-Benz SL55 AMG • Winter Testing Safety Systems in Sweden	28 March 2005
64	3	"Series 7, Episode 3"	Mercedes A-Class • GT4 Launch Party • A1 Grand Prix	4 April 2005
65	4	"Series 7, Episode 4"	TVR Tuscan 2 & TVR Sagaris • Fiat Panda 4x4 • Lotus Esprit 200mph Project • V-Max Car Club	11 April 2005
66	5	"Series 7, Episode 5"	Range Rover Sport • Lamborghini Murcielago • Maserati MC12	18 April 2005
67	6	"Series 7, Episode 6"	Chevrolet Corvette C6 vs. Dodge Viper SRT-10 • Volkswagen Beetle • Ariel Atom 2 • Lamp Post Safety Crash Test	25 April 2005
68	7	"Series 7, Episode 7"	Peugeot 1007 • Mitsubishi Lancer Evolution 8 MR FQ400 vs. Noble M400 • Diesel vs. Petrol Car Prices • Jodie Kidd Racing in the Maserati Trofeo World Series	2 May 2005
69	8	"Series 7, Episode 8"	Jeep Grand Cherokee • Superformance LeMans Coupe • Renaultsport Clio 182 vs. Honda Civic Type-R • Large vs. Small Car Crash Test	9 May 2005
70	9	"Series 7, Episode 9"	Porsche Cayenne S vs. BMW X5 • Compact Executive Car Prestige Survey • Citroën C4 VTS Coupe • Altran Engineering Academy	16 May 2005
71	10	"Series 7, Episode 10"	BMW M5 • MG Rover Car Bargains • Monaco Motor Show	23 May 2005

=== Series 8 (2005) ===
No. overall	No. in season	Title	Reviews/Drives	Original release date
72	1	"Series 8, Episode 1"	Aston Martin V8 Vantage • Sotheby's at Ferrari Auction • Mazda Sassou Concept Car • Porsche 911 Carrera S vs. Lotus Exige Sports 240R • Ford GT • Fighter Pilot vs. Driver	10 October 2005
73	2	"Series 8, Episode 2"	Pagani Zonda F • Sign Post Safety Test • Lexus RX400h • Mitsubishi Lancer Evolution 9 FQ320 vs. Mitsubishi Lancer Evolution 6 • Williams FW25 vs. BMW M5	17 October 2005
74	3	"Series 8, Episode 3"	Bentley Continental Flying Spur • What Can You Buy For The Price of an Average Car • Koenigsegg CCR • Westfield XTR4 vs. Suzuki GSX-R1000 • Racing a Honda Accord Euro R at the Silverstone 24 Hour	24 October 2005
75	4	"Series 8, Episode 4"	Mercedes-Benz S-Class • Goodwood Festival of Speed • Bollard Crash Test • Ford Fiesta ST vs. Mitsubishi Colt CZT • Eco-marathon • Michael Schumacher Interview	31 October 2005
76	5	"Series 8, Episode 5"	Honda NSX • Modified Cars • Aston Martin DB9 Volante • Citroën C-SportLounge • Mazda RX8 vs. Alfa Romeo GT • Lotus Esprit 200MPH Project	7 November 2005
77	6	"Series 8, Episode 6"	Print	14 November 2005
78	7	"Series 8, Episode 7"	Print	21 November 2005
79	8	"Series 8, Episode 8"	Ford Focus ST • Design the London Street Circuit • Studio-G G350 Roadster • Lexus IS220d • Modified Ford Coupe vs. Dodge Ram SRT-10 • Mercedes-Benz CLS55 AMG vs. Jaguar XJR • Jon's Car Stunt	28 November 2005
80	9	"Series 8, Episode 9"	Porsche Cayman S • Honda Civic • Make a Profit at a Car Auction • Volvo V50 T5 vs. Subaru Legacy 3.0R Spec. B • Number Plate Security • Airbag Safety	5 December 2005
81	10	"Series 8, Episode 10"	Lamborghini Gallardo SE • Nissan Micra C+C • Seat Leon • Mercedes-Benz ML • Sat-Nav Systems • BMW E30 M3 vs. Lancia Delta HF Integrale • Fifth Gear Awards • Porsche Boxster vs. BMW Z4	12 December 2005

=== Series 9 (2006) ===
No. overall	No. in season	Title	Reviews/Drives	Original release date
82	1	"Series 9, Episode 1"	Jaguar XK • Jaguar XK Cabriolet • Jaguar E-Type • Pay-as-you-go Car Hire • Mazda NC MX5 vs. Mazda NA MX5 • Geneva Motor Show • Choosing a Supercar for £100,000	10 April 2006
83	2	"Series 9, Episode 2"	MPV Crash Test • Audi Q7 • World's Best Car Cleaner • Subaru Impreza WRX STi vs. Subaru Forester STi • Technic 550 Spider vs. Westfield 11 • Geneva Motor Show Concept Cars	17 April 2006
84	3	"Series 9, Episode 3"	Land Rover G4 Challenge • Ferrari F430 Challenge • BMW Z4 M Roadster • Vauxhall Astra VXR vs. Ford Focus ST • Buying a Maybach	24 April 2006
85	4	"Series 9, Episode 4"	BMW M3 CS vs. Audi RS 4 • Van Horssen Group Car Club • Mazda 3 MPS • Alfa Romeo Brera • How to J-Turn • Mercedes A-Class vs. Toyota Corolla Verso • Pipeline Fuel Saving Card	1 May 2006
86	5	"Series 9, Episode 5"	Volkswagen Fox vs. Toyota Aygo vs. Kia Picanto • Audi S6 • SPF GT (Ford GT replica) • Peugeot 207 • Private Supercar Collection	8 May 2006
87	6	"Series 9, Episode 6"	Maserati Quattroporte • Teaching Girls Aloud to drive • Insurance for youths • BMW M5 vs. BMW M6 • Drifting in a Nissan 350Z Roadster	15 May 2006
88	7	"Series 9, Episode 7"	Car Spy Photography • Volkswagen EOS • Gumball Rally • Golf GTI vs. Skoda Octavia vRS • Honda FCX Clarity Prototype • Chevrolet Corvette Z06	22 May 2006
89	8	"Series 9, Episode 8"	Scenes Behind Mission Impossible 3 • Ferrari 599 GTB Fiorano • Destroy a 16-year-old Mercedes	29 May 2006
90	9	"Series 9, Episode 9"	N/A	5 June 2006
91	10	"Series 9, Episode 10"	BMW 130i VS VW Golf R32 • Citroën C6 Review • Rallycross • Honda Legend VS Audi A6 and BMW 530i Sport • £35000 Mini Radford • Toyota Mega Web Showroom(The World's Biggest Car Dealership)	3 July 2006
92	11	"Series 9, Episode 11"	N/A	10 July 2006
93	12	"Series 9, Episode 12"	N/A	17 July 2006
94	13	"Series 9, Episode 13"	N/A	24 July 2006

=== Series 10 (2006) ===
No. overall	No. in season	Title	Reviews/Drives	Original release date
95	1	"Series 10, Episode 1"	TBA	25 September 2006
96	2	"Series 10, Episode 2"	TBA	2 October 2006
97	3	"Series 10, Episode 3"	TBA	9 October 2006
98	4	"Series 10, Episode 4"	TBA	16 October 2006
99	5	"Series 10, Episode 5"	TBA	23 October 2006
100	6	"Series 10, Episode 6"	TBA	30 October 2006
101	7	"Series 10, Episode 7"	TBA	6 November 2006
102	8	"Series 10, Episode 8"	TBA	13 November 2006
103	9	"Series 10, Episode 9"	TBA	20 November 2006
104	10	"Series 10, Episode 10"	TBA	27 November 2006
105	11	"Series 10, Episode 11"	TBA	4 December 2006
106	12	"Series 10, Episode 12"	TBA	11 December 2006
107	13	"Series 10, Episode 13"	TBA	18 December 2006

=== Series 11 (2007) ===
No. overall	No. in season	Title	Original release date
108	1	"Series 11, Episode 1"	30 April 2007
109	2	"Series 11, Episode 2"	7 May 2007
110	3	"Series 11, Episode 3"	14 May 2007
111	4	"Series 11, Episode 4"	21 May 2007
112	5	"Series 11, Episode 5"	28 May 2007
113	6	"Series 11, Episode 6"	4 June 2007
114	7	"Series 11, Episode 7"	11 June 2007
115	8	"Series 11, Episode 8"	18 June 2007
116	9	"Series 11, Episode 9"	25 June 2007
117	10	"Series 11, Episode 10"	2 July 2007

=== Series 12 (2007) ===
No. overall	No. in season	Title	Original release date
118	1	"Series 12, Episode 1"	3 September 2007
119	2	"Series 12, Episode 2"	10 September 2007
120	3	"Series 12, Episode 3"	17 September 2007
121	4	"Series 12, Episode 4"	24 September 2007
122	5	"Series 12, Episode 5"	1 October 2007
123	6	"Series 12, Episode 6"	8 October 2007
124	7	"Series 12, Episode 7"	15 October 2007
125	8	"Series 12, Episode 8"	22 October 2007

=== Series 13 (2008) ===
No. overall	No. in season	Title	Reviews/Drives	Original release date
126	1	"Series 13, Episode 1"	Lotus Exige S, Caterham Seven, Renault Laguna 2.0L 150hp diesel, Cadillac BLS 1.9L 150hp diesel, Citroën C-Crosser, Citroën 2CV, Mercedes-Benz CLK63 AMG Black Series, Audi TT	21 January 2008
127	2	"Series 13, Episode 2"	RenaultSport Clio 197 R27, R180 RT Rage Buggy, Mitsubishi Colt CZC1, Vauxhall Tigra, Toyota Land Cruiser, Mazda2, Porsche Boxster S, Mercedes-Benz C63 AMG, BMW M3, Volkswagen Polo Bluemotion	28 January 2008
128	3	"Series 13, Episode 3"	Volkswagen Beetle (original), Maserati GranTurismo, Audi A3 Cabriolet 2.0 TDI, Vauxhall VXR8, Lotus Carlton, Subaru Impreza Turbo (first generation), London Taxi	4 February 2008
129	4	"Series 13, Episode 4"	Volkswagen Transporter Sportline VS Mercedes-Benz Vito Sports X, Daihatsu Materia, Nissan Note, Mercedes-Benz SLR McLaren, Porsche Carrera GT, Lamborghini LP640, BMW 635d, Volkswagen GTI (Mk5), Unimog U500, Aston Martin DBS	11 February 2008
130	5	"Series 13, Episode 5"	Renault Twingo GT, Fiat Panda 100HP, Skoda Fabia Estate 1.9L TDI, Peugeot 207 SW 1.6L HDI, Subaru WRX WRC car, BMW 135i, Porsche Cayman, Nissan X-Trail, Land Rover Freelander 2 TD4, Volkswagen GTI (Mk2), Ford Capri Laser 1.6L, Vauxhall Astra 1.6L (Mk4), how to do a motorcycle flip with Travis Pastrana	18 February 2008
131	6	"Series 13, Episode 6"	Mini One, Fiat 500, Nissan GT-R, Volkswagen Tiguan 2.0 TDI, Kia Sportage, Volkswagen Caravelle California camper, Nissan Skyline R33, Renault Laguna, Audi RS6 Avant	25 February 2008
132	7	"Series 13, Episode 7"	Lexus IS-F, Volvo XC70, Vauxhall Corsa SRi, Ford Fiesta ST, Mazda5, Citroën C4 Picasso, Volkswagen Polo BlueMotion, Mitsubishi L200, Nissan Figaro, Smart ForTwo petrol, Smart ForTwo electric	3 March 2008
133	8	"Series 13, Episode 8"	Citroën C5, Porsche Cayenne GTS, BMW X5 (E70) 4.8i, Nissan 350Z Convertible, Honda S2000, Ford Fiesta ST rally car, Behind the scenes at Daytona 500	10 March 2008
134	9	"Series 13, Episode 9"	Volkswagen GTI, Subaru WRX, Isuzu D-Max, Ford Ranger (international version) 3.0 TdCI, Peugeot 406 Coupe, Audi Coupe GT, Alfa Romeo GTV, Bentley Continental GT Speed, Farbio GTS, Jaguar XF 2.7L V6 Diesel, Lotus Elise Supercharged	17 March 2008
135	10	"Series 13, Episode 10"	Ford Focus RS, Ford Escort Cosworth 4x4, Subaru WRX STi, Hummer H3, Mini Cooper S John Cooper Works, Renault Clio Cup, Mazda6 TS2, Mitsubishi Lancer GS4, Lotus Elise (first generation)	24 March 2008

=== Series 14 (2008) ===
No. overall	No. in season	Title	Original release date
136	1	"Series 14, Episode 1"	11 August 2008
137	2	"Series 14, Episode 2"	18 August 2008
138	3	"Series 14, Episode 3"	28 August 2008
139	4	"Series 14, Episode 4"	1 September 2008
140	5	"Series 14, Episode 5"	8 September 2008
141	6	"Series 14, Episode 6"	15 September 2008
142	7	"Series 14, Episode 7"	22 September 2008
143	8	"Series 14, Episode 8"	29 September 2008

=== Series 15 (2009) ===
No. overall	No. in season	Title	Original release date
144	1	"Series 15, Episode 1"	5 January 2009
145	2	"Series 15, Episode 2"	12 January 2009
146	3	"Series 15, Episode 3"	19 January 2009
147	4	"Series 15, Episode 4"	26 January 2009
148	5	"Series 15, Episode 5"	2 February 2009
149	6	"Series 15, Episode 6"	9 February 2009
150	7	"Series 15, Episode 7"	16 February 2009
151	8	"Series 15, Episode 8"	23 February 2009

=== Series 16 (2009) ===
No. overall	No. in season	Title	Reviews/Drives	Original release date
152	1	"Series 16, Episode 1"	Ford Focus RS • Mitsubishi Lancer Evolution X • Audi R8 V10 • Citroën C3 Picasso • Toyota Aygo	8 June 2009
153	2	"Series 16, Episode 2"	Porsche Cayman Manual • Porsche Cayman PDK • Maserati GranTurismo S • Mercedes-Benz SL63 AMG	15 June 2009
154	3	"Series 16, Episode 3"	Porsche Boxster S PDK • BMW Z4 (E89) • Peugeot 308 CC • Volkswagen Eos • Volkswagen Golf GTI • Lotus Evora	22 June 2009
155	4	"Series 16, Episode 4"	Mazda MX-5 2.0i • Mini Cooper S Convertible • Aston Martin V12 Vantage • Smart ForTwo • Toyota MR2	29 June 2009
156	5	"Series 16, Episode 5"	Mazda3 1.6 Sport • Ford Focus 2.0 Zetec • Tramontana R • Military D2B48Ck	6 July 2009
157	6	"Series 16, Episode 6"	Renaultsport Clio 197 Cup • Renaultsport Clio 182 Cup • Toyota Prius • Volkswagen Caddy	13 July 2009
158	7	"Series 16, Episode 7"	Aston Martin DBS Volante • Mercedes-Benz E-Class • Drifting double-decker buses	20 July 2009
159	8	"Series 16, Episode 8"	Mercedes-Benz 190E 16v Cosworth • Ford Sierra RS Cosworth • Toyota Urban Cruiser • Nissan 370Z	27 July 2009

=== Series 17 (2010) ===
No. overall	No. in season	Title	Reviews/Drives	Original release date
160	1	"Series 17, Episode 1"	Ferrari 458 Italia • Ford Focus RS • Renaultsport Megane 250 Cup • Porsche Boxster • Smart ForTwo • Original Austin Mini • Toyota IQ • McLaren MP4-12C	3 June 2010
161	2	"Series 17, Episode 2"	Porsche 911 Turbo Convertible • Audi R8 V10 Convertible • Lamborghini Gallardo LP570-4 Superleggera • Nissan Cube • Volvo S80 1.6 TD	10 June 2010
162	3	"Series 17, Episode 3"	Maserati GranCabrio • Noble M600 • Alfa Romeo MiTo Cloverleaf • Citroën DS3 DSport • Mitsubishi i-MiEV	17 June 2010
163	4	"Series 17, Episode 4"	Rolls-Royce Ghost • Aston Martin Rapide • Nissan 370Z GT Convertible • BMW Z4 (E89) 35i • Skoda Superb Estate	24 June 2010
164	5	"Series 17, Episode 5"	Porsche 911 GT3 RS • Mercedes-Benz E-Class Convertible • Audi A8 TDI • BMW GS	1 July 2010
165	6	"Series 17, Episode 6"	Lexus LFA • BMW 535i • Mercedes-Benz E63 AMG • Audi RS6 • Volvo S60	8 July 2010
166	7	"Series 17, Episode 7"	Lotus Elise • Mercedes-Benz SLS • Ferrari 599 GTO • Land Rover Discovery TDV6 HSE • Toyota Land Cruiser LC5	15 July 2010
167	8	"Series 17, Episode 8"	Chevrolet Camaro SS • Honda CR-Z • Peugeot RCZ 1.6 • Volkswagen Scirocco 1.4 TSI • Volkswagen Golf • Trial driving	22 July 2010
168	9	"Series 17, Episode 9"	Morgan Aero 8 SuperSports • Nissan Juke • VW Golf R • Seat Leon Cupra R • T.25	5 August 2010
169	10	"Series 17, Episode 10"	Nissan GT-R • Mitsubishi Lancer Evolution FQ400 • Audi A1 • Tesla Roadster S	12 August 2010

=== Series 18 (2010) ===
No. overall	No. in season	Title	Reviews/Drives	Original release date
170	1	"Series 18, Episode 1"	BMW M3 • Mercedes-Benz C63 AMG • Bentley Continental Supersports Convertible • Skoda Fabia vRS	8 October 2010
171	2	"Series 18, Episode 2"	Aston Martin V8 Vantage N400 Roadster • Porsche Cayman • Lotus Evora	15 October 2010
172	3	"Series 18, Episode 3"	Pagani Zonda R • Renault Wind • Audi RS5	22 October 2010
173	4	"Series 18, Episode 4"	Noble M600 • Infiniti FX30d • BMW 320d • Alpina D3 BiTurbo • Porsche 944S2	29 October 2010
174	5	"Series 18, Episode 5"	Porsche Panamera Turbo • Mercedes-Benz CL63 AMG • Vauxhall Meriva	5 November 2010
175	6	"Series 18, Episode 6"	Aston Martin DB5 • Audi S4 • Vauxhall Insignia VXR	12 November 2010
176	7	"Series 18, Episode 7"	Porsche Cayenne Turbo • Audi Q7 V12 TDI • Lotus Evora S • Jaguar XJ • Porsche 911 GT2 RS	19 November 2010
177	8	"Series 18, Episode 8"	Chevrolet Camaro SS • Dodge Challenger SRT8 • Volvo S60 • Nissan Leaf • Westfield Sport Turbo	26 November 2010
178	9	"Series 18, Episode 9"	Audi R8 V10 Spyder • Mini Countryman • Honda CR-Z • Citroën DS3 HDi	3 December 2010
179	10	"Series 18, Episode 10"	Audi TT RS • Porsche Boxster S • Nissan 370Z Roadster • Fifth Gear Cars of the Year	10 December 2010

=== Series 19 (2011) ===
No. overall	No. in season	Title	Team Test	Reviews/Drives	Original release date
180	1	"Series 19, Episode 1"	BMW X3 (29/40)	Nissan GT-R • Audi RS3	1 April 2011
181	2	"Series 19, Episode 2"	N/A	Porsche 911 GT3 • Aston Martin Virage • BMW M3 GTS • Citroën DS3 Racing	8 April 2011
182	3	"Series 19, Episode 3"	Nissan Micra (13/40)	Ferrari FF • BMW 535d • Jaguar XF 3.0 SDV6 • Top Fuel Dragster	15 April 2011
183	4	"Series 19, Episode 4"	Peugeot 508 (27.5/40)	Nissan GT-R vs Porsche 911 Turbo S • BMW 6-Series Convertible	6 May 2011
184	5	"Series 19, Episode 5"	Audi A7 (31.5/40)	Ariel Atom • Lotus Evora S • Porsche 911 Carrera S	13 May 2011
185	6	"Series 19, Episode 6"	Lexus CT 200h (23/40)	Aston Martin V8 Vantage S • Mercedes-Benz SLS AMG	20 May 2011
186	7	"Series 19, Episode 7"	Ford Focus (32/40)	Allard J2X MkII • BMW 1M Coupé • Jaguar E-Type	10 June 2011
187	8	"Series 19, Episode 8"	Mercedes-Benz CLS350 CDI Sport (34.5/40)	McLaren MP4-12C vs Ferrari 458 Italia • Nissan 370Z	24 June 2011
188	9	"Series 19, Episode 9"	Volkswagen Phaeton W12 (18/40)	Porsche Cayman R • Lamborghini Gallardo LP 570-4 Spyder Performante	8 July 2011
189	10	"Series 19, Episode 10"	N/A	BMW M3 GTS vs Porsche 911 GT3 RS • Piaggio MP3	15 July 2011

=== Series 20 (2011) ===
No. overall	No. in season	Title	Team Test	Reviews/Drives	Original release date
190	1	"Series 20, Episode 1"	Range Rover Evoque (27.5/30)	Jaguar XJ220 vs Jaguar XKR-S • Bentley Continental GTC	14 October 2011
191	2	"Series 20, Episode 2"	Mercedes-Benz SLK200 (16/30)	Ford Mustang Boss 302 • Lada Niva • Audi RS3 vs BMW 1M Coupé	21 October 2011
192	3	"Series 20, Episode 3"	Porsche Panamera Diesel (11/30)	Mini Coupé JCW • Lamborghini Aventador LP 700-4	28 October 2011
193	4	"Series 20, Episode 4"	Kia Rio 1.1 CRDi (12/30)	Ferrari 458 Spider • Audi RS5 vs Mercedes-Benz C63 AMG Coupé • Citroën DS5	4 November 2011
194	5	"Series 20, Episode 5"	Hyundai i40 (14/30)	Porsche 911 GT3 RS 4.0 • Renault Fluence Z.E. • Honda CR-Z Mugen	18 November 2011
195	6	"Series 20, Episode 6"	BMW 118i (22/30)	Jaguar XKR-S • Volkswagen Amarok • Dacia Duster	25 November 2011
196	7	"Series 20, Episode 7"	Volkswagen Golf Cabriolet (24/30)	Jaguar XFR • Aston Martin Virage Volante	2 December 2011
197	8	"Series 20, Episode 8"	Jeep Grand Cherokee (21/30)	Jaguar XKR-S • Honda Civic • Skoda Fabia vRS	9 December 2011
198	9	"Series 20, Episode 9"	Mercedes-Benz G350 BlueTEC (21/30)	BMW M5 • SEAT Mii • Renault Mégane R.S. Trophy • Nissan 370Z	16 December 2011
199	10	"Series 20, Episode 10"	N/A	Mini Cooper SD • SEAT Ibiza FR TDI • Land Rover DC100 • Jaguar XKR-S	30 December 2011

=== Series 21 (2012) ===
No. overall	No. in season	Title	Team Test	Reviews/Drives	Original release date
200	1	"Series 21, Episode 1"	Volkswagen Beetle (A5) 1.4L TSI Sport (23.5/40)	Porsche 991 Carrera S • Iveco Dakar rally truck • RenaultSport Clio 200 • Nissan GT-R	3 September 2012
201	2	"Series 21, Episode 2"	Kia Optima 1.7L CRDI (26.6/40)	Aston Martin DBS Volante vs. Mercedes-Benz SLS Roadster vs. Jaguar XKR-S vs. Bentley Continental GTC • Audi A1 Quattro 2.0 TFSI • Armoured Toyota Land Cruiser	10 September 2012
202	3	"Series 21, Episode 3"	Suzuki Swift Sport (33/40)	Lotus Exige S V6 • Electronic Stability Control Test • Vauxhall Insignia Estate • Satellite Navigation Test • TX4 • Fisker Karma • Pagani Huayra • Hunton XRS 43 powerboat • Toyota Yaris Rollover Crash Test	18 September 2012
203	4	"Series 21, Episode 4"	Fiat Panda Twinair (24/40)	Lamborghini Gallardo LP 570-4 Super Trofeo Stradale • Toyota GT86 • Kia Sportage AWD Diesel • Premium Fuel Test • Volkswagen GTI Edition 35 • Tiff races in the first round of 2012 Lamborghini Super Trofeo Championships at Monza	24 September 2012
204	5	"Series 21, Episode 5"	Mini Roadster Cooper S (17/40)	Bentley Continental GT 4.0L V8 • Formula Offroad in Iceland • Gordon Murray Design T.27 • McLaren F1	1 October 2012
205	6	"Series 21, Episode 6"	Vauxhall Ampera (31.5/40)	BMW M3 GTS vs. Mercedes-Benz C63 AMG Black Series (with Mika Salo) • Land Rover Defender Prindiville • Ferrari F40 • Lamborghini Countach LP5000 QV • Second Hand Cars: BMW 728i & Jaguar XK8 & Volkswagen Phaeton	8 October 2012
206	7	"Series 21, Episode 7"	Ford Focus 1.0L Ecoboost (32/40)	Subaru BRZ • Jaguar XJ Supersport • Radical SR3 SL • Ariel Atom • Renault Twizy • Jonny meet John McGuinness	15 October 2012
207	8	"Series 21, Episode 8"	Peugeot 208 1.6e-HDi (27/40)	Ferrari California 30 • Nissan Juke-R • Stop/Start System Test	22 October 2012
208	9	"Series 21, Episode 9"	Vauxhall Astra VXR (30.5/40)	KTM X-Bow RR vs. KTM 1190 RC8 R • Power Big Meet car show • Car Hi-Fi Test • Chevrolet Corvette (C6) Grand Sport • Vicki enters the Formula Kart race	29 October 2012

=== Series 22 (2013) ===
No. overall	No. in season	Title	Team Test	Reviews/Drives	Original release date
209	1	"Series 22, Episode 1"	Lexus GS 450h (30/40)	Porsche Boxster S • Audi S8; Audi R8 • Ford Focus ST	11 February 2013
210	2	"Series 22, Episode 2"	Chrysler 300C (11/40)	Pagani Huayra • Porsche 911 Cabriolet vs Audi R8 Spyder • Bowler EXR	18 February 2013
211	3	"Series 22, Episode 3"	Volvo V40 (31/40)	Mercedes-Benz CLS63 AMG vs Porsche Panamera GTS; Savage Rivale Roadyacht GTR	25 February 2013
212	4	"Series 22, Episode 4"	BMW ActiveHybrid5 (25.5/40)	Volkswagen Golf GTI vs Ford Focus ST vs Renault Mégane R.S. 265 Cup vs Vauxhall Astra VXR • Audi RS 4 Avant	4 March 2013
213	5	"Series 22, Episode 5"	Audi S7 (31/40)	Mercedes-Benz SL • Suzuki Swift • Ferrari FF	11 March 2013
214	6	"Series 22, Episode 6"	Hyundai i30 (25/40)	BMW M6 Convertible • Nissan Juke vs Citroën DS3 vs Volkswagen Up! vs Audi A1 vs Mini Cooper D vs Skoda Fabia vRS	18 March 2013
215	7	"Series 22, Episode 7"	BMW 320d EfficientDynamics (34/40)	Suzuki Swift Sport vs Renault Twingo Renaultsport 133 • Ferrari F12; AEBS Test: Volkswagen up! • Volvo V40 • Mercedes-Benz S-Class	25 March 2013
216	8	"Series 22, Episode 8"	Volkswagen up! (26/30)	Mercedes-Benz ML63 AMG vs Porsche Cayenne Turbo (with Mark Higgins); Maserati GranTurismo MC Stradale • Morgan 3 Wheeler; Hands-free bluetooth headsets Test (Plantronics M50) • Pininfarina Cambiano	1 April 2013
217	9	"Series 22, Episode 9"	Range Rover Evoque (24.5/30)	Porsche 911 Carrera S vs BMW M6; Morgan Plus 8 • Fuel saving devices Test	8 April 2013

=== Series 23 (2013) ===
No. overall	No. in season	Title	Team Test	Reviews/Drives	Original release date
218	1	"Range Rover"	Range Rover Autobiography (34.5/40)	Mercedes-Benz SL63 AMG vs Maserati GranCabrio vs Audi R8 V10 Spyder; BMW M135i • BMW HP4 • Dacia Sandero	16 September 2013
219	2	"Jaguar F-Type"	Mazda6 (32/40)	Toyota GT86 vs RenaultSport Mégane 265 • Jaguar F-Type	23 September 2013
220	3	"McLaren 12C Spider"	Volkswagen Golf TDI (28/40)	McLaren 12C Spider • Porsche Cayman • Honda CR-V Crash Test	30 September 2013
221	4	"Aston Martin Vanquish"	Mercedes-Benz A250 Sport (32.5/40)	Porsche 911 STR II • Aston Martin Vanquish • ICON FJ40 • Porsche 911 by Singer Vehicle Design	7 October 2013
222	5	"Bentley Headquarters"	Jaguar XF Sportbrake (33/40)	RenaultSport Clio 200 vs Peugeot 208 GTI vs Ford Fiesta ST; Donkervoort D8 GTO • Bentley Mulsanne	14 October 2013
223	6	"Mercedes G63 AMG"	Hyundai Veloster Turbo (34/40)	Caterham 7 Supersport R vs Morgan 3 Wheeler vs Ariel Atom 3.5; Mercedes-Benz G63 AMG • Peugeot 205 GTI	21 October 2013
224	7	"Aston Martin 100th Anniversary"	Citroën DS3 Cabrio (23/30)	Aston Martin Rapide S • Land Rover Defender EV • Aston Martin DB5	28 October 2013
225	8	"Volvo S60 Polestar"	Ford B-Max (22.5/30)	Volvo S60 Polestar • Volkswagen Golf GTI; Mercedes-Benz CLS63 AMG Shooting Brake	4 November 2013
226	9	"The Flying Spur"	Škoda Octavia (22/30)	MAN TGA Racing Truck • Bentley Flying Spur; Shelby GT500 Super Snake by Galpin Auto Sports	11 November 2013

=== Series 24 (2014) ===
No. overall	No. in season	Title	Team Test	Reviews/Drives	Original release date
227	1	"Budget Bertone"	Mini John Cooper Works GP (27.5/40)	Porsche 911 Turbo S vs Nissan GT-R vs Noble M600; Aston Martin Rapide Bertone	24 February 2014
228	2	"Dakar Rally"	Kia Pro_Cee'd GT (34.5/40)	X-Raid Mini Dakar rally team • Lamborghini Aventador Roadster; Budget telemetry devices Test (Racelogic PerformanceBox)	3 March 2014
229	3	"Indy 500"	Lexus IS 300h (28/40)	Indianapolis 500 • Mercedes-Benz A45 AMG • Engine Oil Tests	10 March 2014
230	4	"Audi vs Mercedes"	SEAT León SC (33.55/40)	Audi RS 6 vs Mercedes-Benz E63 AMG; Range Rover Sport • Volvo V60 Plug-in Hybrid	17 March 2014
231	5	"Vikki Joins the Special Forces"	Renault Captur (28.5/40)	Special Forces Driving Test • Maserati Ghibli • Nissan GT-R	24 March 2014
232	6	"European NASCAR"	Vauxhall Adam (29.5/40)	NASCAR Whelen Euro Series • Rolls-Royce Wraith • Renault Zoe; Ramadan Rush (London supercar spotting) • Chevrolet Camaro	31 March 2014
233	7	"Smith, Bakkerud and Loeb"	Ford Transit Connect Sport (35.5/40)	Petter Solberg and Andreas Bakkerud • Tips on better MPG	7 April 2014
234	8	"Icon Showdown"	BMW 4 Series (35.5/40)	VW Golf GTi Mk.1 vs VW Golf Mk.7 2.0 TDI; Mercedes-Benz E55 AMG • Mercedes-Benz E250 CDI; Audi Quattro 20v • Audi A5 Sportback 2.0TDI	14 April 2014
235	9	"Rally Driving 101"	Audi SQ5 Quattro(32.5/40)	Special rally-based show in Porsche 911 with Mark Higgins and Nicky Grist; Budget Rally Cars	21 April 2014

=== Series 25 (2015) ===
No. overall	No. in season	Title	Team Test	Reviews/Drives	Original release date
236	1	"Episode 1"	Renault Twingo (21/30)	Ferrari F12 vs. Aston Martin Vanquish (with Karun Chandhok); Jaguar Mark 2 by Callum • Alfa Romeo 4C	5 March 2015
237	2	"Episode 2"	BMW 2-Series Active Tourer (13/30)	Porsche 911 Turbo S Cabriolet vs. Aston Martin V12 Vantage S Roadster; Tiff and Mark Higgins give driving lessons to Amy Williams and Samantha Murray, using Nissan 370Z NISMO; Fiat Panda Cross vs. Land Rover Defender	12 March 2015
238	3	"Episode 3"	Citroën C4 Cactus (26/30)	Jaguar XJR vs. Mercedes-Benz S63 AMG (with Karun Chandhok); BMW i8 • 45 years old Formula Ford car vs. new Lotus car	19 March 2015
239	4	"Episode 4"	Fiat 500X (21/30)	Poland Special; Tiff and Vicki enjoy Warsaw in December • Tiff participates in 52nd Barbórka Rally; Porsche 911 Turbo S Cabriolet vs. Bentley Continental GTC Speed	26 March 2015
240	5	"Episode 5"	Vauxhall Corsa (23/30)	Ferrari 458 Speciale vs. Porsche 911 GT3 at Castle Combe (with Chris Harris); Jonny tries to beat a fully automated Audi RS7 at Ascari Circuit in Spain; Bargain buy performance coupés	2 April 2015
241	6	"Episode 6"	Porsche Macan Turbo (26/30)	Tiff participates in Exeter Trial (with Rebecca Jackson); DB Speedback GT • Caterham 620R vs. Ariel Atom 3.5R	9 April 2015

=== Series 26 (2015) ===
No. overall	No. in season	Title	Team Test	Reviews/Drives	Original release date
242	1	"Episode 1 - Car vs. Plane"	Citroën C1 (21.5/30)	MX2 vs. Lamborghini Aventador Roadster • Subaru WRX STi vs. Volkswagen Golf R • Nürburgring tests of the new Kia Optima	2 July 2015
243	2	"Episode 2 - South Africa Special"	Infiniti Q50 (19/30)	Lamborghini Huracán • Toyota Hilux Dakar Rally • Mbombe Armoured Infantry Vehicles	9 July 2015
244	3	"Episode 3"	Ford Mondeo (20/30)	BMW M4 vs. Lexus RCF (with Karun Chandhok) • Second Hand Cars: Suzuki Cappuccino & Vauxhall VX220 & Renault Sport Spider • Bentley Mulsanne Speed vs. Bedford HA Viva Van	16 July 2015
245	4	"Episode 4"	Lexus NX (23/30)	Land Rover Discovery Sport • Ice Rally Racing With Porsche 911 • Audi TT 2.0 TFSI S Line vs. Peugeot RCZ R • Volvo XC90 Crash Test	23 July 2015
246	5	"Episode 5"	Mercedes-Benz C-Class (23.5/30)	Megane Sport Trophy R vs. Seat Leon SC Cupra vs. Audi S3 vs. VW Golf R (with Karun Chandhok, Bruno Senna and Nicolas Prost) • Alpina D3 Biturbo vs. Polestar V60 • Bowler Defender Rally Challenge	6 August 2015
247	6	"Episode 6 - Romania Special"	Mini Cooper D (22.5/30)	Ferrari California • Ghe-O All Terrain Rescue Vehicles • Restored Classic Cars: 1966 Mercedes-Benz 230 SL & 1969 MGC • Sinaia Hill Climb Challenge with Mitsubishi Evo & Dacia Logan	13 August 2015

=== Series 27 (2018) ===
No. overall	No. in season	Title	Team Test	Reviews/Drives	Original release date
248	1	"Episode 1"	DS 7 Crossback (21/40)	Mercedes AMG C63 vs. Alfa Romeo Giulia Quadrifoglio • Jonny tests the new London Taxi LEVC TX • Second Hand Cars: BMW M5 & Mercedes E 55 AMG & Audi RS 6	6 September 2018
249	2	"Episode 2"	Nissan Leaf Tekna 110kW (19/40)	Alfa Romeo Stelvio vs. Jaguar F-Pace • Jonny at Kia Proving Grounds in Kia Stinger GT • Bentley Continental GT	13 September 2018
250	3	"Episode 3"	Mercedes X250 d (22.5/40)	Honda Civic Type R vs. Audi S3 Sportback vs. Seat Leon Cupra R vs. Renault Mégane R.S. (with Karun Chandhok) • Second Hand Cars: Honda Civic Type R & Ford Focus ST & VW Golf GTI	20 September 2018
251	4	"Episode 4"	Dacia Duster Comfort SCe 115 4x2 (25/40)	Caravan vs. Campervan (Mercedes-Benz Marco Polo) • Audi S5 Coupe vs. Kia Stinger GT S • Ronnie O'Sullivan test drives a Hyundai Nexo	27 September 2018
252	5	"Episode 5"	Alpine A110 (27/40)	Range Rover Sport SVR vs. Bentley Bentayga • Jason investigates the Ultra Low Emission Zone • Second Hand Cars: Volvo XC90 & Land Rover Discovery 3 & Audi Q7	4 October 2018
253	6	"Episode 6"	Vauxhall Insignia GSi Sport Tourer (18/40)	Nissan GT-R NISMO vs. Porsche 911 GT3 RS • VW Polo GTI vs. Mini Cooper S • Second Hand Cars: Porsche Boxster & Mercedes SLK & BMW Z4 M Roadster	11 October 2018
254	7	"Episode 7"	Ford Fiesta ST (34.5/40)	Zenos E10 R vs. Radical SR1 vs. Caterham 620R vs. Ariel Atom 3.5R • Jaguar I-Pace • Second Hand Cars: Clio Renault Sport 182 Trophy & Mini Cooper S & Škoda Fabia vRS	18 October 2018
255	8	"Episode 8"	Volvo V60 (27/40)	Ford Mustang vs Chevrolet Camaro • Porsche 718 Cayman GTS vs BMW M2 • Second Hand Cars: Pontiac Firebird & Chevrolet Corvette & Ford Mustang GT	25 October 2018

=== Series 28 (2019) ===
No. overall	No. in season	Title	Team Test	Reviews/Drives	Original release date
256	1	"Episode 1"	Toyota Corolla Excel (15.5/30)	Porsche 911 Carrera 4S vs. McLaren 570S • Swind E Classic Mini & David Brown Mini Remastered • Lotus Elise S1 • Jonny checks the future of autonomous car in South Korea	3 October 2019
257	2	"Episode 2"	Lexus UX 250h F Sport (27/40)	Land Rover Defender 90 vs. Suzuki Jimny • Brabham BT62 • Second Hand Cars: Range Rover L322 & Toyota Land Cruiser J100 & Volkswagen Touareg MK2 V6 • Shoot-out: Volkswagen Up GTI vs. Suzuki Swift Sport	10 October 2019
258	3	"Episode 3"	Audi RS5 Sportback (33/40)	Aston Martin DBS Superleggera vs. Ferrari 812 Superfast • Jonny at Frankfurt Motor Show • Second Hand Cars: Mercedes-Benz CL500 & Maserati 3200 GT & Aston Martin DB7	17 October 2019
259	4	"Episode 4"	Cupra Ateca (23/30)	MS-RT Ford Transit Custom vs. Volkswagen Amarok Highline • Jonny test the Hyundai Ioniq Electric and Plug-in Hybrid in South Korea • Shoot-out: Ford Escort RS Cosworth vs. Ford Fiesta ST	24 October 2019
260	5	"Episode 5"	BMW 320d xDrive M Sport (32.5/40)	Jaguar F-Pace SVR vs. Alfa Romeo Stelvio Quadrifoglio • Morgan Plus Six • Jaguar XJ220 • Ford GT	31 October 2019
261	6	"Episode 6"	Mazda 3 GT Sport Tech (18/40)	Porsche 718 Cayman T vs. Audi TT RS Coupé vs. BMW Z4 M40i vs. Jaguar F-Type Coupé • Tesla Model 3 Performance • Second Hand Cars: BMW Z4 (E89) & Porsche Cayman S (987) & Audi TT RS (8J)	7 November 2019
262	7	"Episode 7"	Jeep Wrangler Sahara (13.5/40)	Tesla Model X vs. Audi e-tron • Ariel Atom 4 • Second Hand Cars: Nissan Leaf & Vauxhall Ampera & BMW i3	14 November 2019
263	8	"Episode 8"	Volvo XC40 T4 AWD (34.5/40)	VW Golf GTI TCR vs. Renault Mégane R.S. 300 Trophy vs. Hyundai i30 N • Porsche Panamera Turbo S E-Hybrid vs. Mercedes-AMG GT 63 4MATIC+ • Second Hand Cars: VW Golf R32 Mk5 & BMW 130i M Sport (E81) & Renault Sport Mégane 275 Trophy	21 November 2019
264	9	"Episode 9"	BMW X7 M50d (18/30)	Brand new car for 10,000 Pound: VW Up! vs. Toyota Aygo X vs. Fiat Panda Cross vs. Dacia Sandero vs. Kia Picanto vs. MG 3 • Lamborghini Urus • Honda NSX • Shoot-out: Škoda Superb Combi SportLine vs. Volvo V90 T5 R-Design	28 November 2019
265	10	"Episode 10"	Toyota GR Supra (21.5/30)	Jonny visit the Kia factory and Namyang R&D center • Audi R8 Performance • Bentley 4½ Litre Blower • Kia Proceed GT • Shoot-out: Lotus Elise Cup 250 vs. Alpine A110 Première Edition	5 December 2019

=== Series 29 (2024) ===
No. overall	No. in season	Title	Team Test	Reviews/Drives	Original release date
266	1	"Episode 1"	Peugeot 408GT 1.2 PureTech (19.5/30)	Lamborghini Urus Performante vs. Lamborghini Huracán LP 610-4 Sterrato • The Little Car Company Ferrari 250 Testa Rossa • Second Hand Cars: Renault Clio Williams & Ford Fiesta ST] • Shoot-out: Kia EV6 GT vs. Alfa Romeo Stelvio Quadrifoglio	12 September 2024
267	2	"Episode 2"	Ford Transit Custom (28.25/30)	Kia EV9 review in Iceland • Second Hand Cars: Jaguar XJ Series 3 & Maserati Quattroporte V • Shoot-out: Mazda MX-5 (ND) Homura vs. Abarth 500e Turismo Cabrio	19 September 2024
268	3	"Episode 3"	Omoda E5 (17/30)	Ferrari Purosangue vs. Bentley Bentayga S (V8) • Second Hand Cars: Mazda MX-5 (NA) & Porsche Boxster (987) • Shoot-out: Audi RS 3 Sportback vs. Mercedes-AMG A 45 S	26 September 2024
269	4	"Episode 4"	Dacia Jogger (15.5/30)	Land Rover Defender (L663) vs. Ineos Grenadier • Shoot-out: Porsche 911 GT3 Cup vs. Porsche 911 GT3 RS • Second Hand Cars: Peugeot 205 XS & Fiat Panda 100HP	3 October 2024
270	5	"Episode 5"	Jeep Avenger Summit (32.5/30)	Tesla Model 3 vs. BMW i4 vs. Volkswagen ID.7 vs. Hyundai Ioniq 6 • Second Hand Cars: Alfa Romeo GTV6 2.5 & BMW M3 (E46) • Shoot-out: Cupra Leon vs. Honda Civic Type R (FL5)	10 October 2024
271	6	"Episode 6"	Volvo EX30 Performance (17/30)	Ford Mustang Mk1 • Ford Mustang Dark Horse • Shoot-out: McLaren 750S vs. Ferrari 296 • Second Hand Cars: Subaru Impreza WRX Sport Wagon & VW Golf R Estate (Mk7)	17 October 2024
