= Mobberley (disambiguation) =

Mobberley is a village in Cheshire, England.

Mobberley or Mobberly may also refer to:

- 7239 Mobberley, a minor planet
- Mobberly Hotel, Longview, Texas
- Mobberley, a hamlet in Staffordshire, England

== People with the surname ==
- Alan Mobberley (born 1948), British car designer
- Andrew Mobberley (born 1992), Samoan footballer
- Herb Mobberley (1904–1988), Canadian football player
- James Mobberley (born 1954), American composer, music teacher and guitarist
- John Mobberly, (C. 1844–1865), Confederate guerrilla in the American Civil War
- Martin Mobberley (born 1958), British amateur astronomer
