= David Brown Speedback =

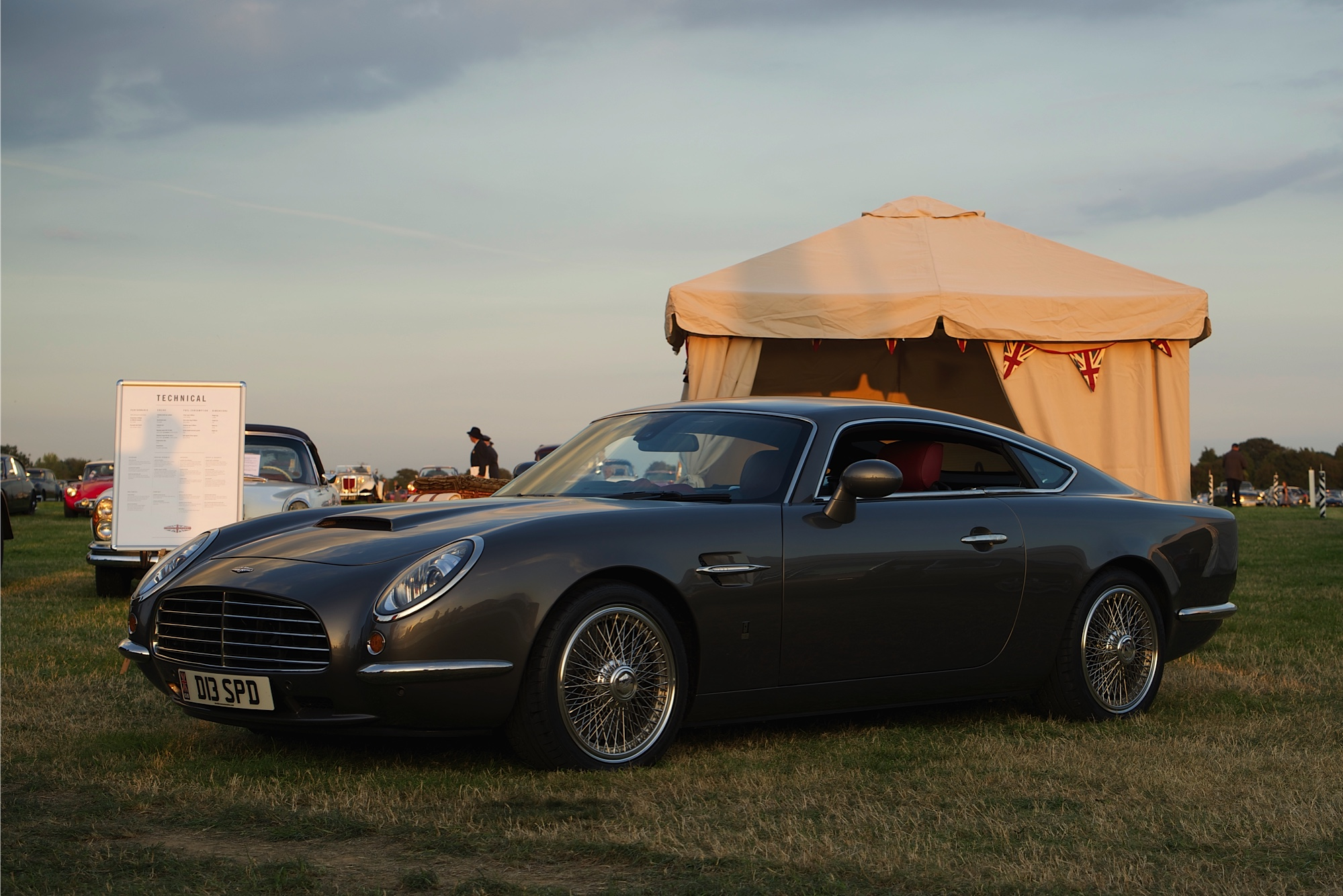

Overview
- Manufacturer: David Brown Automotive
- Production: 2014-2026

Body and chassis
- Class: Grand tourer
- Body style: 2-door 2 or 4-Seats coupé
- Layout: Longitudinally-mounted, Front-engine, rear-wheel-drive
- Platform: JLR D6a
- Related: Jaguar XKR

Powertrain
- Engine: 5.0-Litre Twin-scroll supercharged AJ-V8
- Power output: 375–448 kW (503–601 hp)
- Transmission: 6-speed ZF automatic

Dimensions
- Wheelbase: 2,750 mm (108.3 in)
- Length: 4,760 mm (187.4 in)
- Width: 1,860 mm (73.2 in)
- Height: 1,350 mm (53.1 in)

The David Brown Speedback is a grand tourer produced by the British car manufacturer David Brown Automotive. It is the company's first model and was presented in April 2014 at the "Top Marques" show in Monaco. The Speedback is built in Silverstone, England. David Brown Automotive was dissolved in 2026, thereby ending the production run for the Speedback.

== Specifications ==
The Speedback is based on the all-aluminum Jaguar XKR (XK150) platform and uses its V8 engine. The twin-scroll supercharged 5.0L AJ-V8 engine has a 92.5 mm × 93 mm (3.64 in × 3.66 in) bore and stroke, and produces 503 bhp (375 kW; 510 PS). Power is sent to the rear wheels through a 6-speed ZF automatic transmission. The top speed is electronically limited to 250 km/h (155 mph) and the car can accelerate from zero to 100 km/h (62 mph) in 4.8 seconds.

The Speedback is stylistically similar to the Aston Martin DB5 and DB6 and was designed by former Jaguar Land Rover designer Alan Mobberley. The bespoke body of each Speedback GT is produced using traditional coach building methods; the aluminium body panels are hand beaten and then rolled over an english wheel. The bucks over which the panels are beaten have been milled out using a 5-axis CNC milling machine from CAD data, obtained from the full-size design clay model.

The car is available with either 2 or 2+2 seats. In the luggage compartment there is an additional folding bench, which can be folded out to the picnic. The carriage is 4.77 m (188 in) long, including mirrors, 2.09 m (82 in) wide and 1.32 m (52 in) high.

No more than 100 Speedback GTs were to be built, priced at about £495,000.

At the 87th Geneva Motor Show in March 2017, the revised version of the Speedback GT was introduced.

== Silverstone Edition ==
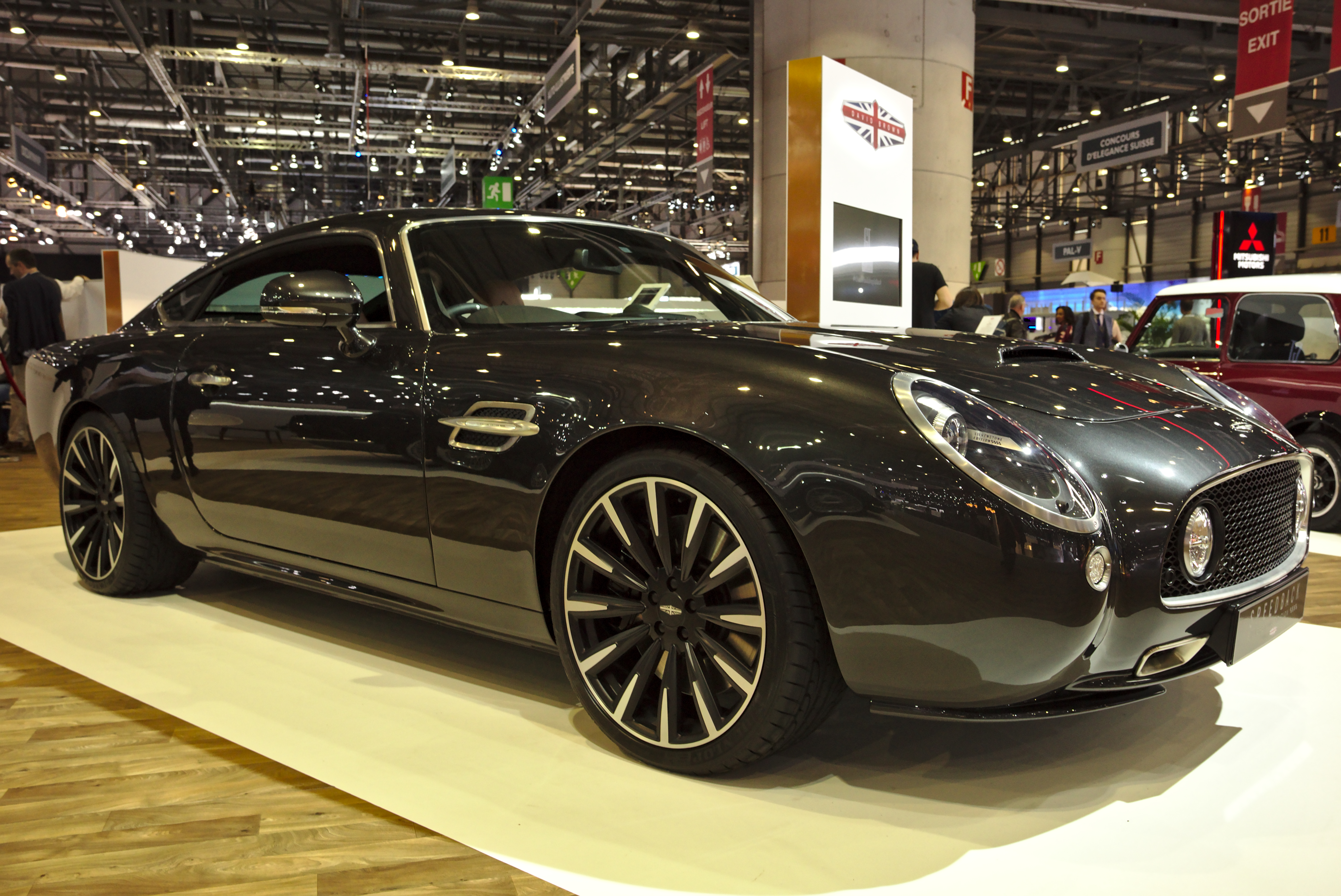
David Brown Speedback Silverstone Edition

Launched on 6 March 2018 at the Geneva International Motor Show, the Speedback Silverstone Edition is the third special edition model made by David Brown.

Limited to 10 examples globally, the Silverstone Edition is a performance-focused version of the Speedback GT, and celebrates the company's first anniversary of its move to the new Silverstone build facility and headquarters in April 2017.

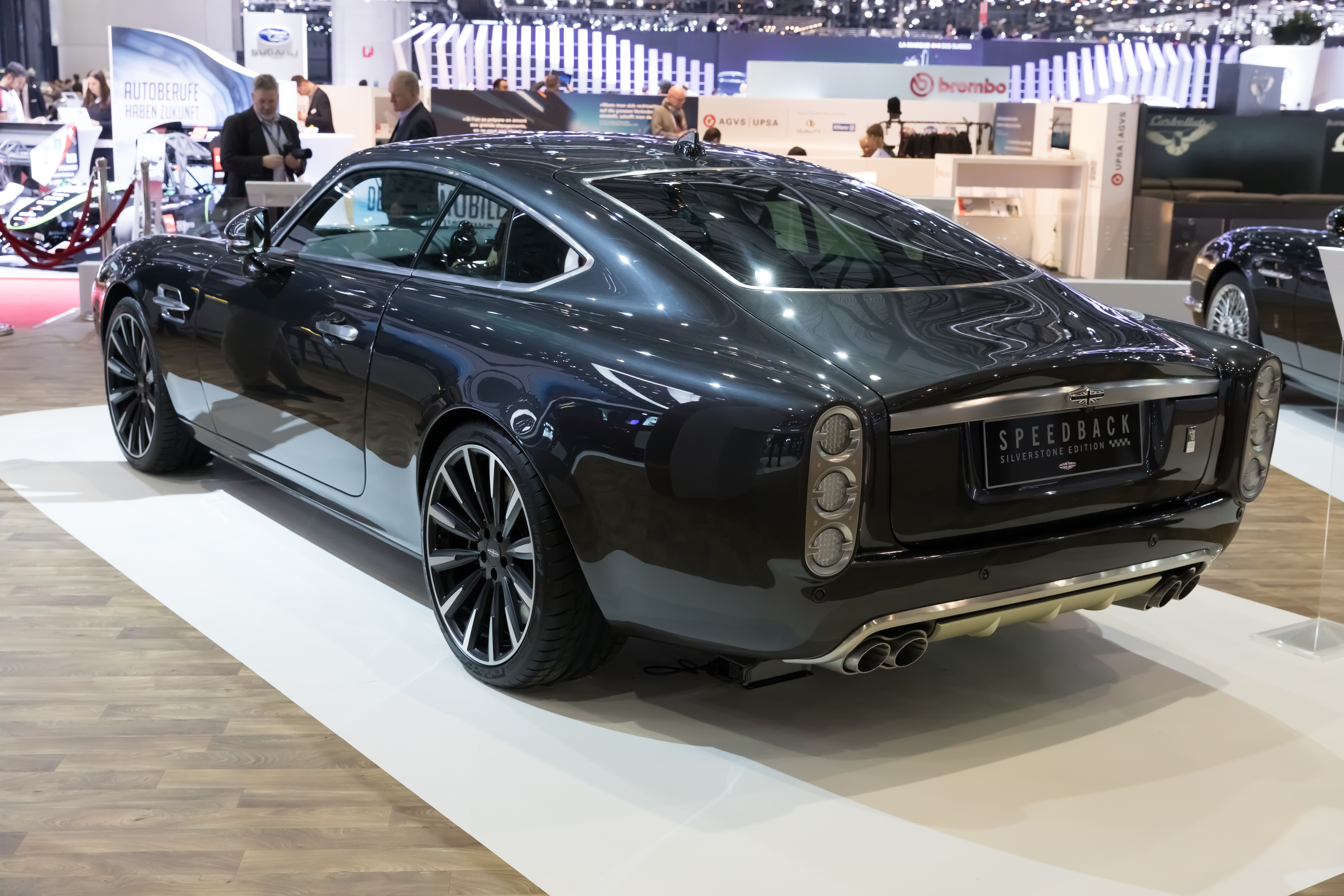
David Brown Speedback Silverstone Edition rear view

Taking design inspiration from classic 1960s racing grand tourers and British jet aircraft of the era, the Silverstone Edition uses the same traditional coachbuilding techniques to craft its bespoke, streamlined hand-rolled aluminium bodywork as the Speedback GT, with enhanced performance from the 5.0-litre Jaguar AJ-V8 engine, now developing 601 bhp (448 kW; 609 PS) and 565 lb⋅ft (766 N⋅m) of torque. The rear suspension is also updated over the existing set-up in the Speedback GT.

Each of the 10 Speedback Silverstone Edition examples will be built to the same specification, with just left-hand and right-hand drive and 2-seater or 2+2 configuration differences.

A bespoke 'Fly by Night' paint finish, applied over 8 weeks is offered on the Silverstone Edition, with a subtle, fading 'Black Night' painted stripe across the length of the body, while the interior cockpit is trimmed in 'Antique' tan leather, with brogueing and fluting to the seats, evocative of the 1960s cars and aircraft that the car is inspired by. Premium Kvadrat Remix fabrics and 'Scorched Ebony Macassar' wood veneers are also specified in the interior.

== Models ==
=== Petrol engines ===
Model	Years	Engine	Power	Torque	0–100 km/h (0-62 mph)
Speedback GT	2015-	5.0-Litre V8	375 kW (503 hp; 510 PS) at 6,000-6,500 rpm	625 N⋅m (461 lb⋅ft) at 6,000-6,500 rpm	4.8 s
Speedback Silverstone Edition	2018-	5.0-Litre V8	448 kW (601 hp; 609 PS) at 2,500-5,500 rpm	766 N⋅m (565 lb⋅ft) at 4,030 rpm	4.3 s
