= David Brown Automotive =

British Coach Builder (Aston Martin Mini)

David Brown Automotive Limited
- Type: Limited Company
- Industry: Automotive
- Founded: 2013
- Founder: David Brown
- Defunct: February 17, 2026
- Fate: Liquidated
- Headquarters: Silverstone, England
- Products: Limited production cars
- Website: davidbrownautomotive.com

David Brown Automotive is a British coachbuilder and manufacturer of limited production cars based in Silverstone, England. The company was founded in Coventry in 2013 by British businessman David Brown to create modern interpretations of classic vehicles. Its first model, the Speedback GT was launched in 2014. The company was dissolved on February 17, 2026, following a move from administration to dissolution.

== History ==
=== Founding (2013) ===
David Brown Automotive was founded in Coventry, England in 2013 to create coach-built classic-inspired cars featuring modern technologies and convenience. The company was founded by its eponymous David Brown, who bears no relation to Sir David Brown of Aston Martin and his companies. This was realised with the Aston Martin DB6-inspired Speedback GT, which was announced in March 2014. The car is based on a one-off example that had been custom built by Coventry-based Envisage, initially for Brown's personal use. The vehicle and consequently, the marque made its debut at the Top Marques show in Monaco in April of that same year.

=== Expansion (2017–2020) ===
On April 6, 2017, the company announced Mini Remastered, inspired by the classic Mini, launched in Shoreditch, London. Following the company's expansion to a second model, David Brown Automotive was relocated from its Binley factory to a new 18,000 sq. ft dedicated build facility and headquarters at Silverstone Park in April 2017. The Speedback GT and prototypes for the Mini Remastered and Speedback Silverstone Edition were showcased at the Geneva International Motor Show in 2017 and 2018. In July 2020, the company's eponymous founder announced the sale of his majority share to UK Advanced Industrials. The company was henceforth led by Eddie Kembery as CEO, formerly of Aston Martin and Ford, with Brown remaining as company director.

=== Financial issues and dissolution (2024–2026) ===
David Brown left his post as company director in 2023. Following financial issues faced by the company in the 2020s, David Brown Automotive was placed into administration in November 2024 with MB Insolvency appointed as administrators. After a year in administration, MB Insolvency filed a notice to move the company to dissolution on November 17, 2025. The company was liquidated and declared dissolved three months later, on February 17, 2026.

== Models ==
=== Speedback GT ===
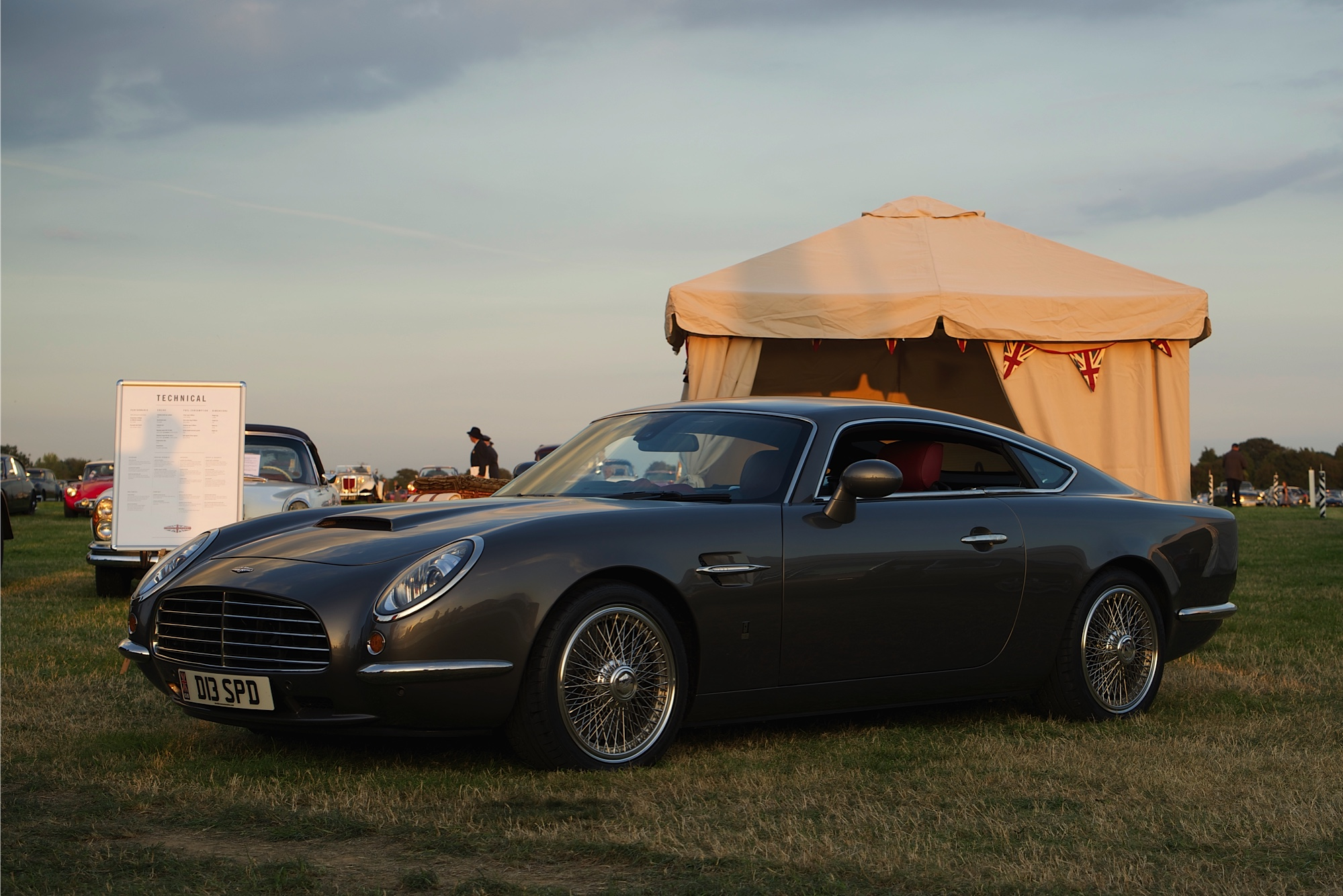
Speedback GT at Goodwood Revival September 2014

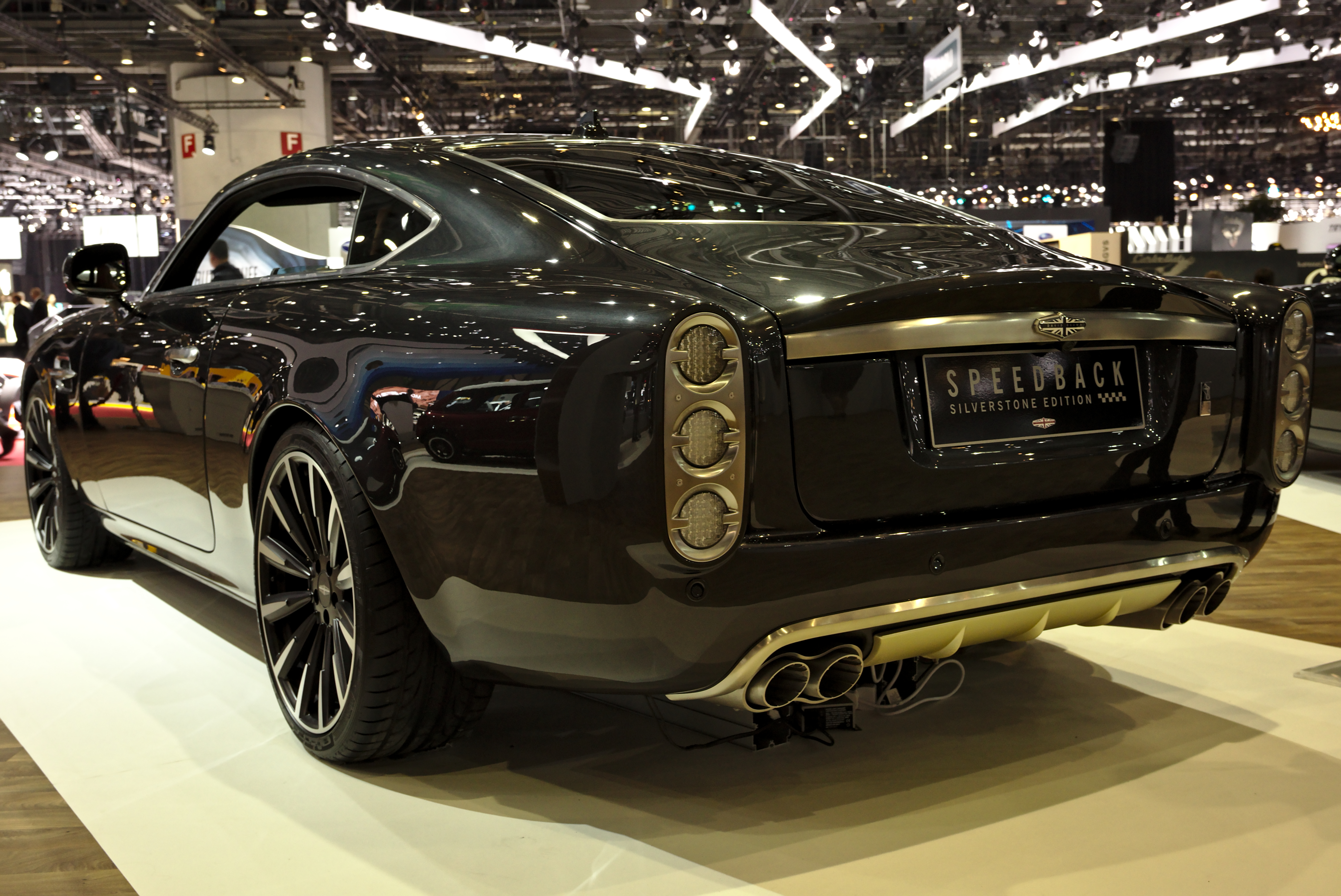
David Brown Automotive Speedback Silverstone Edition, launched at the Geneva International Motor Show 2018

Launched at the Top Marques Show in Monaco in April 2014, the Speedback GT is the marque's first model. Inspired by the 1960s and the Aston Martin DB6, the grand tourer was coach-built using the Jaguar XK all-aluminium platform. The company sources its production to British-based suppliers and builds the cars at their build facility in Silverstone, UK.

The Speedback GT was designed by former Jaguar Land Rover (JLR) designer Alan Mobberley. Its body is produced using traditional coach-building methods; the aluminium body panels are hand beaten and then rolled over an English wheel. The bucks over which the panels are beaten have been milled out using a 5-axis CNC milling machine from CAD data, obtained from the full-size design clay model. The car is powered by a 5.0-litre Jaguar AJ-V8 engine generating 503 bhp (375 kW; 510 PS) with a six-speed ZF automatic transmission. It can accelerate from 0 to 60 mph (0 to 97 km/h) in 4.6 seconds with further performance upgrades available.

At the Geneva International Motor Show in 2017, the Speedback GT was showcased in two specifications, one left-hand and one right-hand drive. These full-production specification examples encompassed over 230 engineering and design refinements from the original Speedback GT prototype, including soft-close doors and enhanced noise insulation.

=== Speedback Silverstone Edition ===
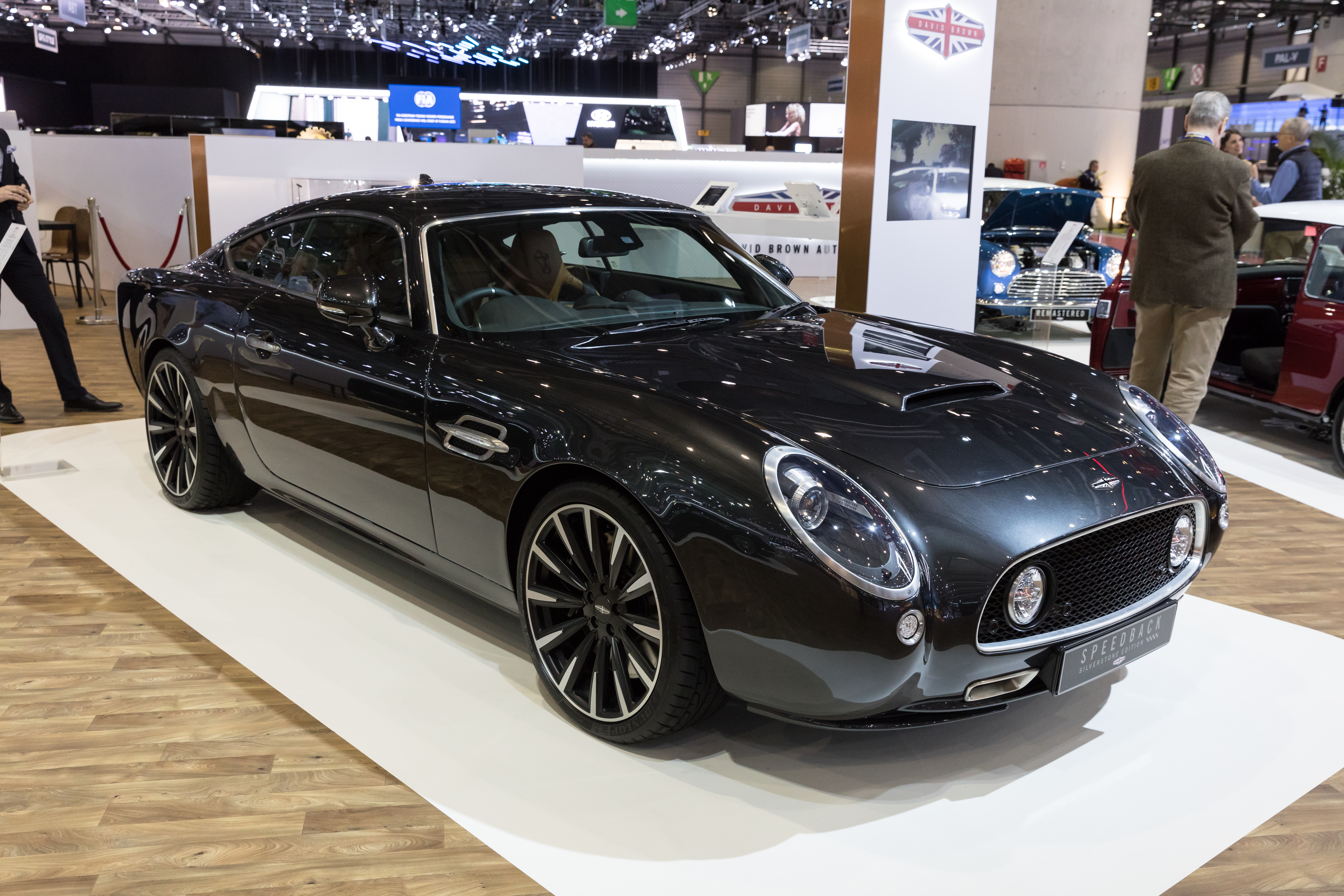
David Brown Automotive Speedback Silverstone Edition, launched at the Geneva International Motor Show 2018

Launched on March 6, 2018 at the Geneva International Motor Show, the Speedback Silverstone Edition is the third particular edition model made by David Brown after the Mini Remastered Café Racers Edition and Monte Carlo Edition. The model was launched to celebrate the company's first anniversary of its move to the new Silverstone build facility and headquarters in April 2017.

Limited to 10 examples, the Silverstone Edition is the performance version of the Speedback GT. The grand tourer features additional performance from a 5.0-litre Jaguar AJ-V8 engine, which generates 601 bhp (448 kW; 609 PS) and 565 lb⋅ft (766 N⋅m) of torque. Updated rear suspension adds further dynamic handling to the model over the existing set-up from the Speedback GT. The car features a bespoke 'Fly by Night' paint finish, applied over 8 weeks is offered with a fading dark painted stripe and a tan leather interior cockpit with brogued and fluted seats.

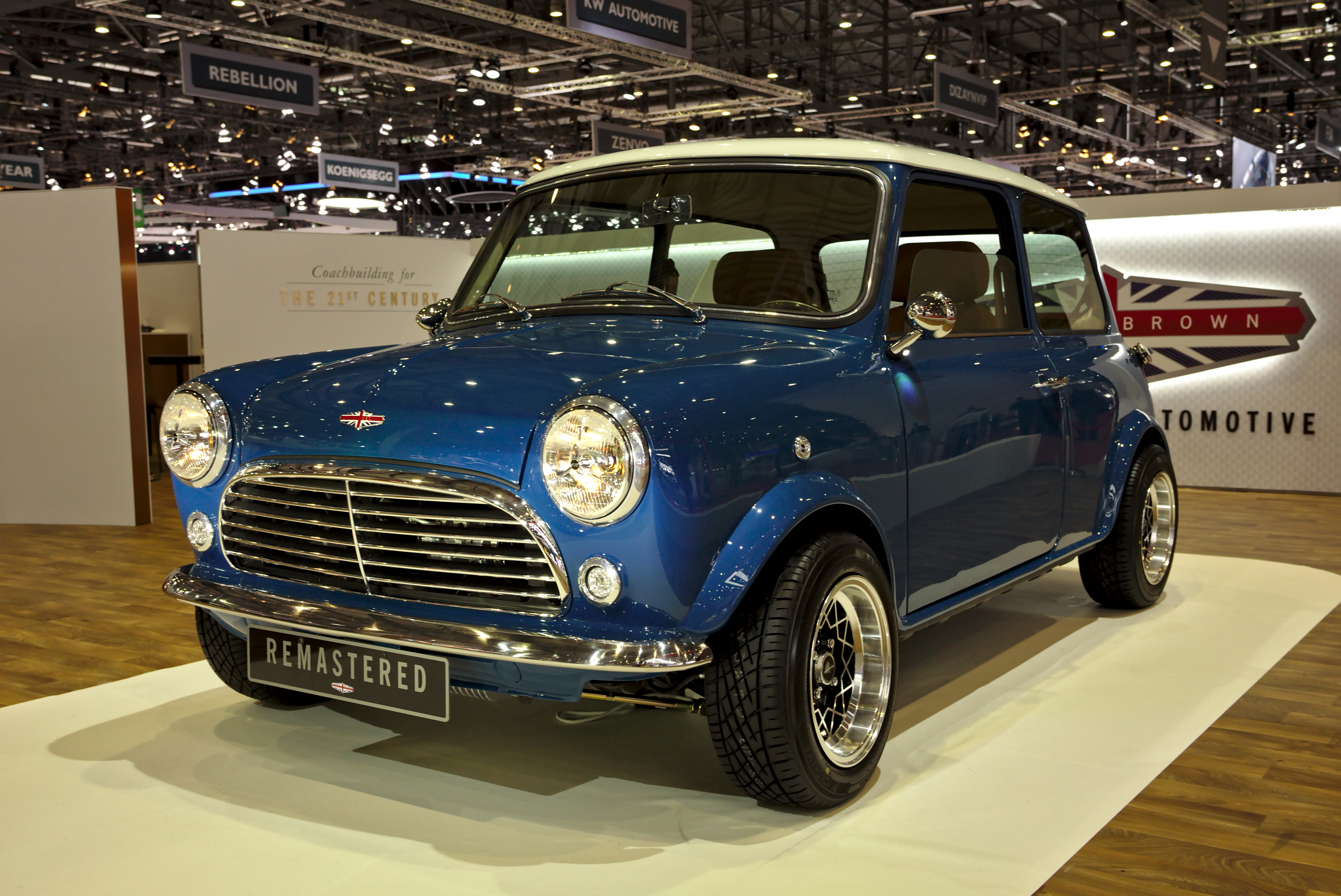
Mini Remastered at the Geneva International Motor Show 2018

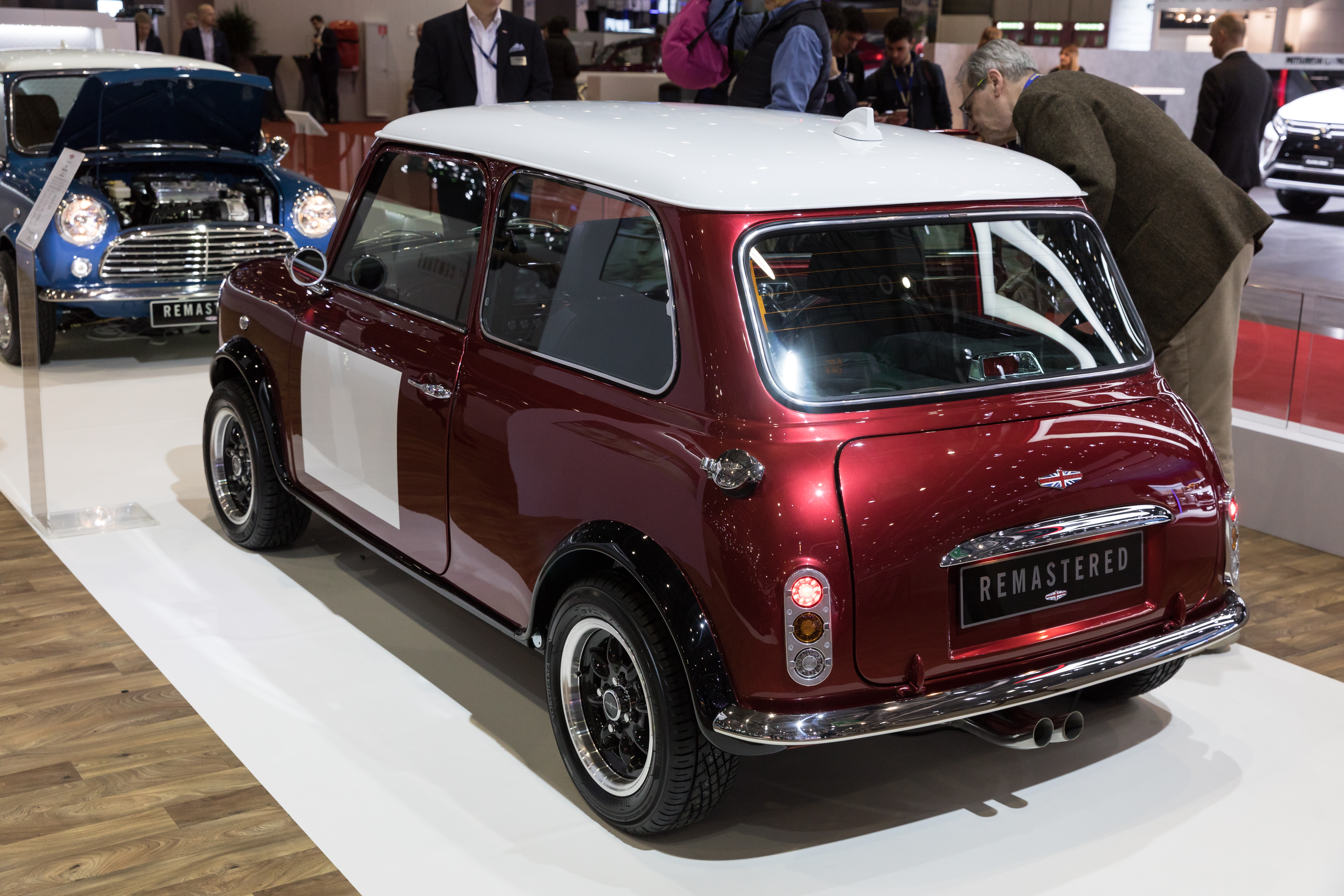
Mini Remastered, Inspired by Monte Carlo at the Geneva International Motor Show 2018

=== Mini Remastered ===
The Mini Remastered is the company's second model. It is a remastered version of the original Mini, which had been built between 1958 and 2000. The Mini Remastered was launched at a private event in Shoreditch, London in April 2017, and made its world motor show debut on 20 April 2017 at the Top Marques Show in Monaco.

Launched in three specifications, the Mini Remastered was showcased in standard form, alongside two limited-production special editions: One special edition is inspired by Café Racers, with a history to the classic 1960s motorbike movement, and a second special edition inspired by Monte Carlo, along with the racing heritage of the classic Mini on which the cars are based.

Each Mini Remastered is built on an original classic Mini donor vehicle's 1275cc I4 (A-series) engine and gearbox, which is refurbished to deliver up to 83 bhp (62 kW; 84 PS). A new steel body shell is custom made by British Motor Heritage, which is then coach-built by David Brown Automotive. Interior technology and connectivity are added, including electric power-assisted steering, air conditioning, an electric start/stop button, remote central locking, full LED lighting and a 7-inch touchscreen infotainment system.

== See also ==
- List of car manufacturers of the United Kingdom
