= David Brown Mini Remastered =

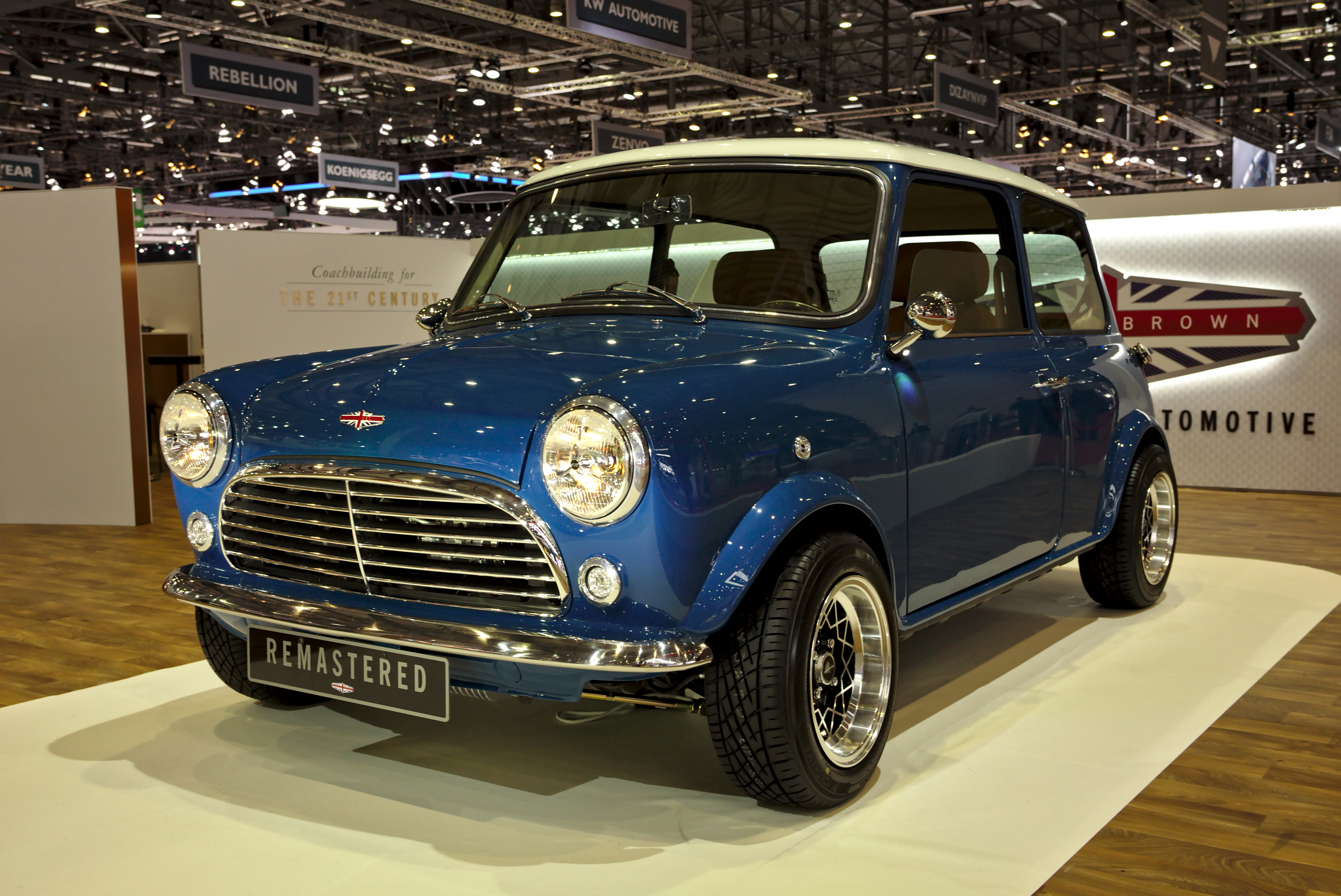

Overview
- Manufacturer: David Brown Automotive
- Production: 2017-2026

Body and chassis
- Class: City car (A)
- Body style: 2-door coupé
- Layout: Front-engine, front-wheel-drive
- Related: Mini

Powertrain
- Engine: 1.3L A-1275 Engine MPi I4; 1.33L A-1330 Engine MPi I4
- Power output: 53–62 kW (71–83 hp)
- Transmission: 4 or 5-speed manual

Dimensions
- Wheelbase: 2,035 mm (80.1 in)
- Length: 3,055 mm (120.3 in)
- Width: 1,470 mm (57.9 in)
- Height: 1,330 mm (52.4 in)

The David Brown Mini Remastered is a city car produced by the British car manufacturer David Brown Automotive. It was unveiled in April 2017 at the Top Marques in Monaco. The vehicle is a remastering of the original Mini built between 1959 and 2000. The car's production run ended in following the dissolution of David Brown Automotive in 2026.

== Equipment ==
In contrast to the sparingly equipped original Mini, the Mini Remastered features electric power-assisted steering, air conditioning, electric start/stop button, remote central locking, full LED lighting and a 7-inch touchscreen infotainment system with Apple® CarPlay®, satellite navigation, 3G, 4G, Bluetooth® and DAB connectivity. In addition, the vehicle is available in twelve exterior colours and three for the roof.

The Mini Remastered is available globally in both left-hand and right-hand drive.

== Engines ==
The Mini Remastered is powered by a 1275cc A-Series engine, except for the Monte Carlo edition, which uses a 1330cc version.

Mini Remastered Engine options
Displacement	Bore	Stroke	Compression ratio	Injection Type	Power	@rpm	Torque	@rpm	CO2 emissions	0-60 mph (97 km/h) (s)	Top speed
1,275 cc (1.275 L; 77.8 cu in)	70.6 mm (2.78 in)	81.28 mm (3.200 in)	10.1:1	MultiPoint Injection (MPi)	72 PS (53 kW; 71 hp)	4600	88 lb⋅ft (119 N⋅m)	3100	184g/km	11.7	90 mph (145 km/h)
1,330 cc (1.33 L; 81 cu in)	72.19 mm (2.842 in)	81.28 mm (3.200 in)	10.1:1	MultiPoint Injection (MPi)	84 PS (62 kW; 83 hp)	-	-	-	-	8.9	90 mph (145 km/h)

== Special models ==
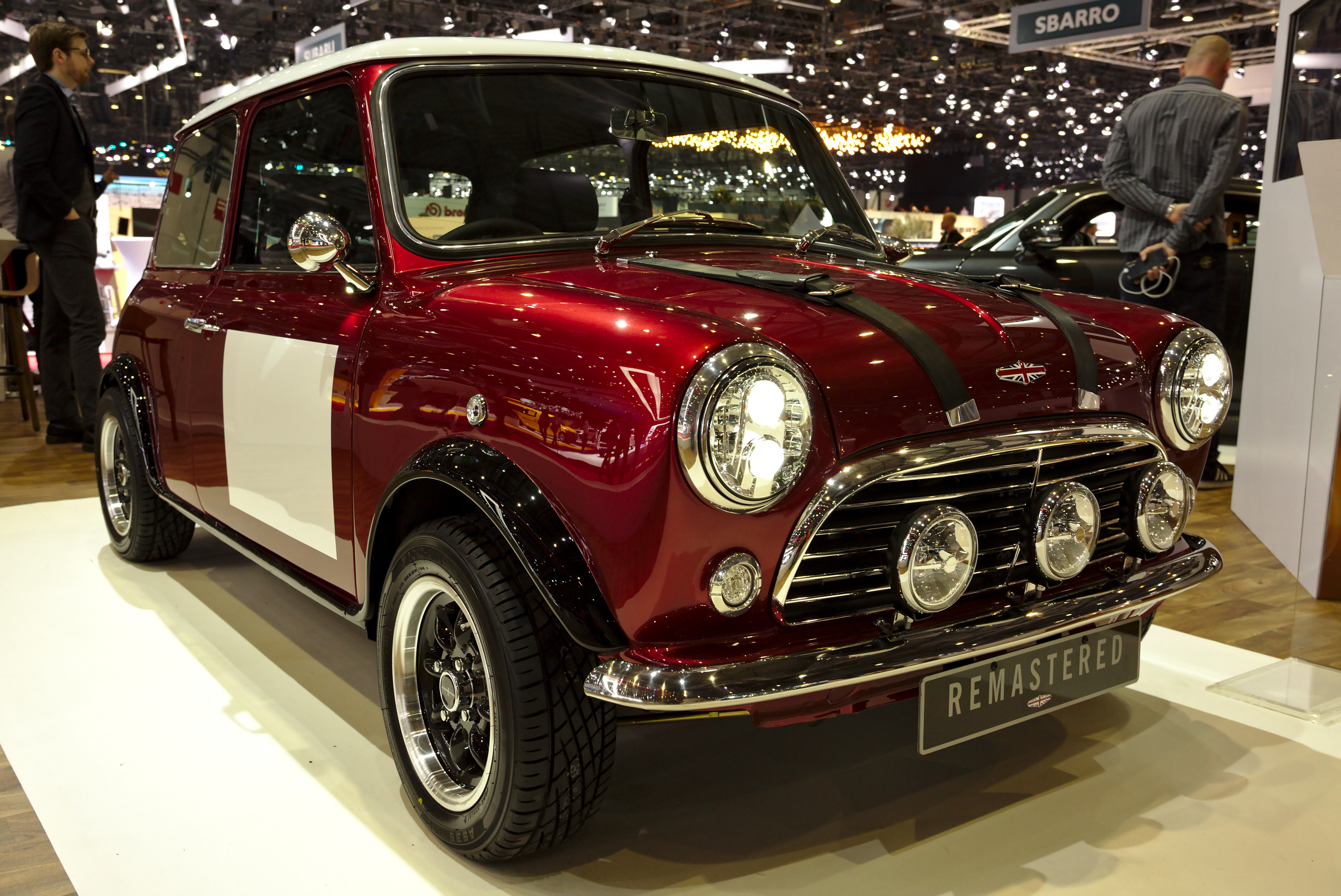
Inspired by Monte Carlo at the Geneva Motorshow 2018

The Mini Remastered also offers two limited-production special editions, the Mini Remastered, Inspired by Café Racers, taking inspiration from the classic 1950s motorbike movement, and Mini Remastered, Inspired by Monte Carlo, taking inspiration from the racing heritage of the classic Mini on which the cars are based. Both special editions are limited to just 25 examples.
