= Herb Mobberley =

Canadian football player (1904–1988)

Profile
- Position: End

Personal information
- Born: 1904; Dudley, Worcestershire, England
- Died: June 26, 1988 (aged 83); Winnipeg, Manitoba, Canada
- Listed weight: 150 lb (68 kg)

Career history
- 1935–1939: Winnipeg Blue Bombers

Awards and highlights
- 2× Grey Cup champion (1935, 1939)

W. H. (Herb) Mobberley (1904 – June 26, 1988) was a Canadian football player who played for the Winnipeg Blue Bombers. He won the Grey Cup with Winnipeg in 1935 and 1939.
