= Alan Mobberley =

British car designer (born 1948)

- Born: 9 April 1948 (age 77); Coventry, England
- Occupation: Car designer
- Employer: David Brown Automotive

Alan Mobberley (born 9 April 1948) is a British car designer. He is former Head of Design at Land Rover; a position he held for 19 years. The last project he worked on was the Land Rover Discovery 4.

His current role is Head of Design at David Brown Automotive, for which he designed their first model, Speedback GT.
